= List of adventure films of the 1980s =

A list of adventure films released in the 1980s

== 1980 ==
Title	Director	Cast	Country	Subgenre/Notes
The Awakening	Mike Newell	Charlton Heston, Susannah York	United Kingdom	
Battle Beyond the Stars	Jimmy T. Murakami	Richard Thomas, Robert Vaughn, George Peppard, John Saxon, Sybil Danning	United States	Space adventure
Beyond the Reef	Frank C. Clarke	Dayton Ka'ne, Maren Jensen	United States	
The Blue Lagoon	Randal Kleiser	Brooke Shields, Christopher Atkins	United States	Romantic adventure
The Blues Brothers	John Landis	John Belushi, Dan Aykroyd	United States	Adventure comedy
Breaker Morant	Bruce Beresford	Edward Woodward, Jack Thompson, John Waters	Australia	
Brigade mondaine : Vaudou aux Caraïbes	Philippe Monnier	Patrice Valota, Marcel Dalio	France	
Caboblanco	J. Lee Thompson	Charles Bronson, Jason Robards, Dominique Sanda, Fernando Rey, Gilbert Roland	United States	
Cannibal Holocaust	Ruggero Deodato	Carl Gabriel Yorke, Robert Kerman, Francesca Ciardi, Perry Pirkanen, Luca Barbareschi	Italy	
Cloud Dancer	Barry Brown	David Carradine, Jennifer O'Neill, Joseph Bottoms	United States	
The Courage of Kavik the Wolf Dog	Peter Carter	Andrew Ian McMillan, Ronny Cox, John Ireland	Canada	Family-oriented adventure
Cuba Crossing	Chuck Workman	Stuart Whitman, Robert Vaughn, Woody Strode	United States; West Germany	
The Curse of King Tut's Tomb	Philip Leacock	Eva Marie Saint, Robin Ellis, Raymond Burr, Harry Andrews, Wendy Hiller	United States; United Kingdom	
Dead Man's Float	Peter Sharp	Sally Boyden, Greg Rowe, Bill Hunter, Bunney Brooke	Australia	
Desperate Voyage	Michael O'Herlihy	Christopher Plummer	United States	
Devil Hunter	Jesús Franco	Al Cliver, Ursula Buchfellner	France; West Germany; Spain	
The Dogs of War	John Irvin	Christopher Walken, Tom Berenger	United Kingdom; United States	War adventure
The Earthling	Peter Collinson	William Holden, Rick Schroder	Australia; United States	Adventure drama
Eaten Alive!	Umberto Lenzi	Janet Ågren, Mel Ferrer, Ivan Rassimov, Me Me Lai, Robert Kerman	Italy; Spain	Jungle film
The Empire Strikes Back	Irvin Kershner	Mark Hamill, Harrison Ford, Carrie Fisher, Billy Dee Williams	United States	Space adventure
Escape from Hell	Edoardo Mulargia	Anthony Steffen, Ajita Wilson, Cintia Lodetti	Italy; Spain	
Flash Gordon	Mike Hodges	Sam J. Jones, Melody Anderson, Topol, Max von Sydow, Ornella Muti	United Kingdom; United States	Space adventure
Flatfoot in Egypt	Steno	Bud Spencer, Robert Loggia, Karl-Otto Alberty	Italy	
The Gods Must Be Crazy	Jamie Uys	Marius Weyers, Sandra Prinsloo, N!xau	South Africa; Botswana	Adventure comedy
The Green Horizon	Susumu Hani	James Stewart, Kathy, Philip Sayer	Japan	
Hawk the Slayer	Terry Marcel	John Terry, Jack Palance	United Kingdom	
Herbie Goes Bananas	Vincent McEveety	Cloris Leachman, Charles Martin Smith, Harvey Korman	United States	Family-oriented adventure
High Ice	Eugene S. Jones	David Janssen, Tony Musante	United States	
I'm Getting a Yacht	Sergio Corbucci	Laura Antonelli, Johnny Dorelli	Italy	
The Island	Michael Ritchie	Michael Caine, David Warner	United States	Sea adventure
It Rained All Night the Day I Left	Nicolas Gessner	Tony Curtis, Louis Gossett Jr., Sally Kellerman, John Vernon	Canada; France; Israel	Adventure drama, romantic adventure
The Ivory Ape	Tsugunobu Kotani	Jack Palance	United States; Japan	
Jupiter's Thigh	Philippe de Broca	Annie Girardot, Philippe Noiret	France	Adventure comedy
Kagemusha	Akira Kurosawa	Tatsuya Nakadai	Japan	
Klondike Fever	Peter Carter	Jeff East, Angie Dickinson, Rod Steiger, Lorne Greene	Canada	
The Last Flight of Noah's Ark	Charles Jarrott	Elliott Gould, Geneviève Bujold, Rick Schroder	United States	Sea adventure
Life on the Mississippi	Peter H. Hunt	Robert Lansing, David Knell	United States	Family-oriented adventure
Más allá de la aventura	Oscar Barney Finn	Catherine Alric	Argentina	
Mondo Cannibale	Jesús Franco	Al Cliver, Sabrina Siani	France	
The Mountain Men	Richard Lang	Charlton Heston, Brian Keith	United States	Western
Pirates of the 20th Century	Boris Durov	Nikolai Yeremenko Jr., Pyotr Velyaminov, Talgat Nigmatulin	Soviet Union	Sea Adventure
Popeye	Robert Altman	Robin Williams, Shelley Duvall, Paul Smith	United States	Family-oriented adventure
Raise the Titanic	Jerry Jameson	Richard Jordan, Anne Archer, Jason Robards, Alec Guinness, David Selby	United States	Sea adventure
The Sea Wolves	Andrew V. McLaglen	Gregory Peck, Roger Moore, David Niven, Trevor Howard, Patrick Macnee	United Kingdom; Switzerland; United States	War adventure, sea adventure
Skyward	Ron Howard	Bette Davis, Suzy Gilstrap, Clu Gulager	United States	
Superman II	Richard Lester	Christopher Reeve, Gene Hackman, Terence Stamp, Ned Beatty, Sarah Douglas, Margot Kidder	United Kingdom; United States	
Theo Against the Rest of the World	Peter F. Bringmann	Marius Müller-Westernhagen	West Germany	Adventure comedy
Tusk	Alejandro Jodorowsky	Cyrielle Clair, Anton Diffring	France	

== 1981 ==
Title	Director	Cast	Country	Subgenre/Notes
La Chèvre	Francis Veber	Pierre Richard, Gérard Depardieu	France	Adventure comedy
Clash of the Titans	Desmond Davis	Harry Hamlin, Laurence Olivier, Claire Bloom, Burgess Meredith, Maggie Smith, Ursula Andress	United Kingdom; United States	Fantasy adventure
Death Hunt	Peter Hunt	Charles Bronson, Lee Marvin, Carl Weathers, Angie Dickinson	United States	Western
Dot and Santa Claus	Yoram Gross	Drew Forsythe (voice), Barbara Frawley (voice)	Australia	Animated film
Dragonslayer	Matthew Robbins	Peter MacNicol, Caitlin Clarke, Ralph Richardson	United Kingdom	Fantasy adventure
Escape from New York	John Carpenter	Kurt Russell, Lee Van Cleef, Ernest Borgnine, Donald Pleasence, Isaac Hayes	United States; United Kingdom	
Excalibur	John Boorman	Nigel Terry, Nicol Williamson, Helen Mirren, Nicholas Clay	United States	Fantasy adventure
For Your Eyes Only	John Glen	Roger Moore, Carole Bouquet, Julian Glover, Chaim Topol	United Kingdom	
The Fox and the Hound	Ted Berman, Art Stevens, David Michener	Mickey Rooney (voice), Kurt Russell (voice), Pearl Bailey (voice), Jack Albertson (voice)	United States	Animated film, family-oriented adventure
Gallipoli	Peter Weir	Mel Gibson, Mark Lee	Australia	
Goliath Awaits	Kevin Connor	Mark Harmon, Christopher Lee, Eddie Albert, Emma Samms, John Carradine, Alex Cord, Robert Forster	United States	
Great White	Enzo G. Castellari	James Franciscus, Vic Morrow	Italy	
Green Ice	Ernest Day	Ryan O'Neal, Anne Archer, Omar Sharif	United States	Romantic adventure
The Guns and the Fury	Tony Zarrindast	Peter Graves, Cameron Mitchell, Michael Ansara	United States	
Heavy Metal	Gerald Potterton		Canada; United States	Animated film, fantasy adventure
The High Country	Harvey Hart	Timothy Bottoms, Linda Purl	Canada	Romantic adventure
High Risk	Stewart Raffill	James Brolin, Anthony Quinn, James Coburn, Ernest Borgnine, Lindsay Wagner, Cleavon Little, Bruce Davison	United States	Adventure comedy
The Last Chase	Martyn Burke	Lee Majors, Burgess Meredith, Chris Makepeace, Alexandra Stewart	Canada; United States	
Lion of the Desert	Moustapha Akkad	Anthony Quinn, Oliver Reed, Rod Steiger, Irene Papas, John Gielgud	Libya; United States	
Masada	Boris Sagal	Peter O'Toole, Peter Strauss, Barbara Carrera, Anthony Quayle	United States	
Misterio en la isla de los monstruos	Juan Piquer Simón	Terence Stamp, Peter Cushing, Ana Obregón	Spain	Fantasy adventure
Quest for Fire	Jean-Jacques Annaud	Everett McGill, Rae Dawn Chong, Ron Perlman	France; Canada	
Race for the Yankee Zephyr	David Hemmings	Ken Wahl, Lesley Ann Warren, Donald Pleasence, George Peppard	Australia; New Zealand	
Raiders of the Lost Ark	Steven Spielberg	Harrison Ford, Karen Allen, John Rhys-Davies, Denholm Elliott, Paul Freeman, Ronald Lacey	United States	
Roar	Noel Marshall	Tippi Hedren, Noel Marshall, John Marshall	United States	
Savage Harvest	Robert L. Collins	Tom Skerritt, Michelle Phillips	United States; Brazil; Kenya	
Silence of the North	Allan King	Ellen Burstyn, Tom Skerritt	Canada	Adventure drama
Sphinx	Franklin J. Schaffner	Lesley-Anne Down, Frank Langella, Maurice Ronet, John Gielgud, John Rhys-Davies	United States	
Tarzan, the Ape Man	John Derek	Bo Derek, Miles O'Keeffe, Richard Harris, John Phillip Law	United States	
Time Bandits	Terry Gilliam	Sean Connery, David Warner, Ralph Richardson, John Cleese, Shelley Duvall, Ian Holm, Michael Palin	United Kingdom	Fantasy adventure
Zorro, The Gay Blade	Peter Medak	George Hamilton, Lauren Hutton, Brenda Vaccaro	United States	Adventure comedy

== 1982 ==
Title	Director	Cast	Country	Subgenre/Notes
Ace of Aces	Gérard Oury	Jean-Paul Belmondo, Marie-France Pisier, Rachid Ferrache	West Germany; France	Adventure comedy, war adventure
The Beastmaster	Don Coscarelli	Marc Singer, Tanya Roberts, Rip Torn	United States	Romantic adventure
Conan the Barbarian	John Milius	Arnold Schwarzenegger, James Earl Jones, Sandahl Bergman, Max von Sydow	United States	
The Dark Crystal	Jim Henson, Frank Oz	Jim Henson (voice), Kathryn Mullen (voice), Dave Goelz (voice)	United States; United Kingdom	Fantasy adventure
E.T. the Extra-Terrestrial	Steven Spielberg	Drew Barrymore, Dee Wallace, Henry Thomas, Peter Coyote	United States	
Falcon's Gold	Bob Schulz	John Marley, Simon MacCorkindale	United States	
Firefox	Clint Eastwood	Clint Eastwood	United States; Austria; Greenland	
Fitzcarraldo	Werner Herzog	Klaus Kinski, José Lewgoy, Miguel Ángel Fuentes, Claudia Cardinale	West Germany	Adventure drama
The Flight of Dragons	Jules Bass, Arthur Rankin Jr.		United States	Animated film, fantasy adventure
Flight of the Eagle	Jan Troell	Max von Sydow, Göran Stangertz, Sverre Anker Ousdal	Sweden; Norway; West Germany	
Hunters of the Golden Cobra	Antonio Margheriti	David Warbeck, Almanta Suska, Luciano Pigozzi, John Steiner	Italy	
Ivanhoe	Douglas Camfield	Anthony Andrews, Sam Neill, James Mason, Olivia Hussey, Lysette Anthony, Julian Glover, John Rhys-Davies	United Kingdom; United States	
The Last Unicorn	Jules Bass, Arthur Rankin Jr.	Alan Arkin (voice), Jeff Bridges (voice), Mia Farrow (voice) Angela Lansbury (voice), Christopher Lee (voice)	United States; Japan; United Kingdom; West Germany	Animated film, fantasy adventure
Les Maîtres du temps	René Laloux		France; Switzerland; West Germany	Animated film, space adventure
Mother Lode	Charlton Heston	Charlton Heston, Nick Mancuso, Kim Basinger	United States	
The New Travelog to India	Kim Jeong-song	Yu Sang-gyeom, Yang Su-jin, Kim Yong-man, Ban Sam, Lee Jae-yeong	South Korea	
Night Crossing	Delbert Mann	John Hurt, Jane Alexander, Beau Bridges	United States	
Paradise	Stuart Gillard	Willie Aames, Phoebe Cates	United States	Romantic adventure
The Pirate Movie	Ken Annakin	Kristy McNichol, Christopher Atkins, Ted Hamilton	Australia	
Safari 3000	Harry Hurwitz	David Carradine, Stockard Channing, Christopher Lee	United States	
The Scarlet Pimpernel	Clive Donner	Anthony Andrews, Jane Seymour, Ian McKellen	United Kingdom	
Space Adventure Cobra: The Movie	Osamu Dezaki		Japan	Animated film, space adventure
Star Trek II: The Wrath of Khan	Nicholas Meyer	William Shatner, Leonard Nimoy, Ricardo Montalbán	United States	Space adventure
The Sword and the Sorcerer	Albert Pyun	Lee Horsley, Kathleen Beller, Simon MacCorkindale	United States	Fantasy adventure
Tangiers	Michael E. Briant	Ronny Cox, Billie Whitelaw, Glynis Barber, Ronald Lacey	United States; Morocco	
Treasure of the Four Crowns	Ferdinando Baldi	Tony Anthony, Ana Obregón, Gene Quintano, Francisco Rabal	United States; Italy; Spain	
The Year of Living Dangerously	Peter Weir	Mel Gibson, Sigourney Weaver, Linda Hunt	Australia	

== 1983 ==
Title	Director	Cast	Country	Subgenre/Notes
L'Africain	Philippe de Broca	Catherine Deneuve, Philippe Noiret	France	
Banzaï	Claude Zidi	Coluche, Valérie Mairesse, Didier Kaminka	France	Adventure comedy
The Black Stallion Returns	Robert Dalva	Kelly Reno, Vincent Spano, Allen Garfield, Woody Strode, Ferdy Mayne	United States	Family-oriented adventure
Buddies	Arch Nicholson	Colin Friels, Harold Hopkins	Australia	
Clash of Loyalties	Mohammed Shukri Jameel	Oliver Reed, John Barron, Ghazi al-Takriti	Iraq	
Les Compères	Francis Veber	Pierre Richard, Gérard Depardieu, Anny Duperey	France	Adventure comedy
Conquest	Lucio Fulci	Jorge Rivero, Andrea Occhipinti, Conrado San Martín	Italy	Fantasy adventure
El Norte	Gregory Nava	Zaide Silvia Gutiérrez, David Villalpando, Ernesto Gómez Cruz	United States; Mexico	Adventure drama
Fire and Ice	Ralph Bakshi		United States	Animated film, fantasy adventure
Gold Raiders	Chalong Pakdeevijit	Robert Ginty, Sarah Langenfeld	Thailand; United Kingdom	Action adventure
Hearts and Armour	Giacomo Battiato	Rick Edwards, Barbara De Rossi, Zeudi Araya, Ronn Moss, Leigh McCloskey, Maurizio Nichetti, Tanya Roberts	Italy	
Hercules	Luigi Cozzi	Lou Ferrigno, Sybil Danning, Brad Harris	Italy; United States	Fantasy adventure
High Road to China	Brian G. Hutton	Tom Selleck, Bess Armstrong, Jack Weston, Wilford Brimley, Robert Morley, Brian Blessed	United States	Romantic adventure
The Killing of Satan	Efren C. Piñon	Cecile Castillo, Charlie Davao	Philippines	Fantasy adventure
Krull	Peter Yates	Ken Marshall, Lysette Anthony, Freddie Jones	United States; United Kingdom	Fantasy adventure
Nate and Hayes	Ferdinand Fairfax	Tommy Lee Jones, Michael O'Keefe, Jenny Seagrove, Max Phipps	United States; New Zealand; Fiji	Sea adventure
National Lampoon's Vacation	Harold Ramis	Chevy Chase, Beverly D'Angelo, Imogene Coca, Randy Quaid	United States	
Never Cry Wolf	Carroll Ballard	Charles Martin Smith, Brian Dennehy, Zachary Ittimangnaq	United States	Adventure drama
Octopussy	John Glen	Roger Moore, Maud Adams, Louis Jourdan, Kabir Bedi, David Meyer	United Kingdom	
The Pirates of Penzance	Wilford Leach	Kevin Kline, Angela Lansbury, Linda Ronstadt	United States	Costume adventure, sea adventure, swashbuckler
Return of the Jedi	Richard Marquand	Mark Hamill, Harrison Ford, Carrie Fisher, Billy Dee Williams	United States	Space adventure
The Ruffian	José Giovanni	Lino Ventura, Bernard Giraudeau, Claudia Cardinale	France; Canada	
Sahara	Andrew V. McLaglen	Brooke Shields, Lambert Wilson, Horst Buchholz, John Mills, John Rhys-Davies, Ronald Lacey	United States	
Spacehunter: Adventures in the Forbidden Zone	Lamont Johnson	Peter Strauss, Molly Ringwald, Ernie Hudson, Michael Ironside	United States	Space adventure
The Wicked Lady	Michael Winner	Faye Dunaway, Alan Bates, John Gielgud	United Kingdom	Adventure drama
The Wind in the Willows	Mark Hall	David Jason, Richard Pearson, Ian Carmichael, Michael Hordern, Beryl Reid, Una Stubbs, Jonathan Cecil, Brian Trueman, Allan Bardsley, Edward Kelsey	United Kingdom	Stop-motion, adventure
Yellowbeard	Mel Damski	Graham Chapman, Peter Boyle, Cheech Marin, Tommy Chong, Peter Cook, Marty Feldman, James Mason, John Cleese	United Kingdom	Adventure comedy
Zu Warriors from the Magic Mountain	Tsui Hark	Yuen Biao, Tsui Siu Keung, Sammo Hung	Hong Kong	Fantasy adventure

== 1984 ==
Title	Director	Cast	Country	Subgenre/Notes
The Ark of the Sun God	Antonio Margheriti	David Warbeck, John Steiner, Susie Sudlow, Luciano Pigozzi	Italy	
The Bounty	Roger Donaldson	Mel Gibson, Anthony Hopkins, Laurence Olivier	United States	Adventure drama
A Breed Apart	Philippe Mora	Rutger Hauer, Powers Boothe, Kathleen Turner, Donald Pleasence	United States	
Conan the Destroyer	Richard Fleischer	Arnold Schwarzenegger, Grace Jones, Wilt Chamberlain	United States	Fantasy adventure
The Cowra Breakout	Phillip Noyce, Chris Noonan	Alan David Lee, Junichi Ishida	Australia	
Dune	David Lynch	Kyle MacLachlan, Sting, Kenneth McMillan, Patrick Stewart, Linda Hunt, Max von Sydow, Sean Young, Jürgen Prochnow, Brad Dourif, José Ferrer	United States	Space adventure
The Dungeonmaster	Dave Allen, Charles Band, John Carl Buechler	Jeffrey Byron, Richard Moll, Leslie Wing	United States	Science fantasy adventure
Greystoke: The Legend of Tarzan, Lord of the Apes	Hugh Hudson	Christopher Lambert, Ralph Richardson, Ian Holm, James Fox, Andie MacDowell	United Kingdom	Adventure drama
The Hit	Stephen Frears	John Hurt, Terence Stamp, Tim Roth, Laura del Sol, Fernando Rey	United Kingdom	
Indiana Jones and the Temple of Doom	Steven Spielberg	Harrison Ford, Kate Capshaw, Ke Huy Quan, Amrish Puri	United States	
Kim	John Davies	Ravi Sheth, Peter O'Toole, Bryan Brown, John Rhys-Davies, Julian Glover	United Kingdom	
The Last Starfighter	Nick Castle	Lance Guest, Robert Preston, Dan O'Herlihy	United States	Space adventure
Le Léopard	Jean-Claude Sussfeld	Claude Brasseur, Dominique Lavanant, Marius Weyers	France	
The Master of Ballantrae	Douglas Hickox	Michael York, Richard Thomas, Timothy Dalton, Finola Hughes, John Gielgud, Brian Blessed	United Kingdom; United States	
Les Morfalous	Henri Verneuil	Jean-Paul Belmondo, Jacques Villeret, Michel Constantin, Marie Laforêt, Matthias Habich	France	Adventure comedy, war adventure
Nairobi Affair	Marvin J. Chomsky	Charlton Heston, John Savage, Maud Adams	United States	
The NeverEnding Story	Wolfgang Petersen	Noah Hathaway, Barret Oliver, Tami Stronach	West Germany; United States	Fantasy adventure
No Time to Die	Helmut Ashley	John Phillip Law, Horst Janson, Christopher Mitchum	West Germany; Indonesia	
A Passage to India	David Lean	Peggy Ashcroft, Judy Davis, James Fox, Alec Guinness	United Kingdom	
The Perils of Gwendoline in the Land of the Yik-Yak	Just Jaeckin	Tawny Kitaen, Brent Huff, Zabou Breitman, Bernadette Lafont, Jean Rougerie	France	Adventure comedy
Romancing the Stone	Robert Zemeckis	Michael Douglas, Kathleen Turner, Danny DeVito, Zack Norman, Alfonso Arau	United States	Adventure comedy
Ronia, the Robber's Daughter	Tage Danielsson	Hanna Zetterberg, Börje Ahlstedt, Lena Nyman	Sweden; Norway	Fantasy adventure
Sheena	John Guillermin	Tanya Roberts, Ted Wass, Donovan Scott	United States	
Star Trek III: The Search for Spock	Leonard Nimoy	William Shatner, DeForest Kelley, Christopher Lloyd	United States	Space adventure
Sword of the Valiant	Stephen Weeks	Miles O'Keeffe, Sean Connery, Cyrielle Clair, Trevor Howard, Peter Cushing, John Rhys-Davies	United Kingdom	
Tuareg – The Desert Warrior	Enzo G. Castellari	Mark Harmon	Italy; Spain	
Le Vol du Sphinx	Laurent Ferrier	Miou-Miou, Alain Souchon	France	
The Warrior and the Sorceress	John C. Broderick	David Carradine, Luke Askew, María Socas	Argentina; United States	
Wet Gold	Dick Lowry	Brooke Shields, Burgess Meredith, Tom Byrd, Brian Kerwin	United States	
Wheels on Meals	Sammo Hung	Jackie Chan, Yuen Biao, Sammo Hung	Hong Kong	Adventure comedy
Yellow Hair and the Fortress of Gold	Matt Cimber	Laurene Landon, Ken Roberson, Luis Lorenzo	Spain	

== 1985 ==
Title	Director	Cast	Country	Subgenre/Notes
The Aviator	George Miller	Christopher Reeve, Rosanna Arquette, Jack Warden	United States	Romantic adventure, adventure drama
Baby: Secret of the Lost Legend	Bill L. Norton	William Katt, Sean Young, Patrick McGoohan	United States	
Back to the Future	Robert Zemeckis	Michael J. Fox, Christopher Lloyd, Lea Thompson	United States	Science fiction adventure
Barbarian Queen	Hector Olivera	Lana Clarkson, Dawn Dunlap, Frank Zagarino	United States; Argentina	Fantasy adventure
Black Arrow	John Hough	Oliver Reed, Fernando Rey, Donald Pleasence, Benedict Taylor	United States	
The Black Cauldron	Ted Berman, Richard Rich		United States	Animated film, fantasy adventure
Burke & Wills	Graeme Clifford	Jack Thompson, Nigel Havers, Greta Scacchi	Australia	Adventure drama
Ça n'arrive qu'à moi	Francis Perrin	Francis Perrin, Véronique Genest, Bernard Blier	France	Adventure comedy
The Corsican Brothers	Ian Sharp	Trevor Eve, Geraldine Chaplin, Donald Pleasence	United States	
The Emerald Forest	John Boorman	Powers Boothe, Meg Foster, Charley Boorman	United Kingdom; United States	Adventure drama
Enemy Mine	Wolfgang Petersen	Dennis Quaid, Louis Gossett Jr., Brion James	United States	Science fiction adventure
Explorers	Joe Dante	Ethan Hawke, River Phoenix, Jason Presson	United States	Space adventure
Flesh and Blood	Paul Verhoeven	Rutger Hauer, Jennifer Jason Leigh	United States; Netherlands; Spain	
The Goonies	Richard Donner	Sean Astin, Corey Feldman, Ke Huy Quan, Jeff Cohen, Josh Brolin, Martha Plimpton, Anne Ramsey, Robert Davi	United States	Adventure comedy
The Jewel of the Nile	Lewis Teague	Michael Douglas, Kathleen Turner, Danny DeVito	United States	Adventure comedy
The Journey of Natty Gann	Jeremy Kagan	Meredith Salenger, John Cusack, Ray Wise	United States	Family-oriented adventure
Jungle Raiders	Antonio Margheriti	Christopher Connelly, Lee Van Cleef	Italy	
King David	Bruce Beresford	Richard Gere	United Kingdom; United States	
King Solomon's Mines	J. Lee Thompson	Richard Chamberlain, Sharon Stone, Herbert Lom, John Rhys-Davies	United States	Romantic adventure
The Knight of the Dragon	Fernando Colomo	Harvey Keitel, Klaus Kinski, Fernando Rey, Maria Lamor, Miguel Bosé	Spain	Fantasy adventure
Ladyhawke	Richard Donner	Matthew Broderick, Rutger Hauer, Michelle Pfeiffer	United States	Fantasy adventure
Legend	Ridley Scott	Tom Cruise, Mia Sara, Tim Curry	United Kingdom; United States	Fantasy adventure
Lupin the 3rd: The Golden Legend of Babylon	Seijun Suzuki, Shigetsu Yoshida		Japan	Animated film
Mad Max Beyond Thunderdome	George Miller, George Ogilvie	Mel Gibson, Tina Turner	Australia	
Un marinaio e mezzo	Tommaso Dazzi	Franco Nero, Francisco Rabal	Italy	
Merlin and the Sword	Clive Donner	Malcolm McDowell, Candice Bergen, Edward Woodward, Dyan Cannon, Rupert Everett, Liam Neeson	United States	Fantasy adventure
National Lampoon's European Vacation	Amy Heckerling	Chevy Chase, Beverly D'Angelo, Dana Hill, Jason Lively	United States	
Orion's Belt	Ola Solum (Norwegian version), Tristan de Vere Cole (English version)	Helge Jordal, Sverre Anker Ousdal, Hans Ola Sørlie, Kjersti Holmen	Norway	Arctic adventure
Out of Africa	Sydney Pollack	Meryl Streep, Robert Redford, Klaus Maria Brandauer	United States	
Out of Control	Allan Holzman	Martin Hewitt, Betsy Russell, Claudia Udy, Andrew J. Lederer	United States; Yugoslavia	
Pee-wee's Big Adventure	Tim Burton	Paul Reubens	United States	Adventure comedy, family-oriented adventure
Rambo: First Blood Part II	George P. Cosmatos, Peter MacDonald	Sylvester Stallone, Richard Crenna, Charles Napier	United States	War adventure
Red Sonja	Richard Fleischer	Brigitte Nielsen, Arnold Schwarzenegger, Sandahl Bergman	United States	Fantasy adventure
Return to Oz	Walter Murch	Fairuza Balk, Nicol Williamson, Jean Marsh	United States; United Kingdom	Fantasy adventure
Runaway Train	Andrei Konchalovsky	Jon Voight, Eric Roberts, Rebecca De Mornay	United States	Adventure drama
Santa Claus: The Movie	Jeannot Szwarc	David Huddleston, Dudley Moore, John Lithgow	United States; United Kingdom	Family-oriented adventure
Spies Like Us	John Landis	Chevy Chase, Dan Aykroyd, Steve Forrest	United States	Adventure comedy
The Treasure of the Amazon	René Cardona Jr.	Stuart Whitman, Donald Pleasence, Ann Sidney, Bradford Dillman	Mexico; United States	
A View to a Kill	John Glen	Roger Moore, Tanya Roberts, Grace Jones, Patrick Macnee, Christopher Walken	United Kingdom	
Wills & Burke	Bob Weis	Garry McDonald, Kim Gyngell, Jonathan Hardy	Australia	Adventure comedy

== 1986 ==
Title	Director	Cast	Country	Subgenre/Notes
Allan Quatermain and the Lost City of Gold	Newt Arnold, Gary Nelson	Richard Chamberlain, Sharon Stone, James Earl Jones, Henry Silva	United States	Adventure comedy
An American Tail	Don Bluth	Phillip Glasser (voice), Dom DeLuise (voice), Nehemiah Persoff (voice)	United States	Animated film, family-oriented adventure
Babar and Father Christmas	Gerry Capelle	Laurent de Brunhoff (narrator), James Bradford (voice)	Canada	Animated film
Big Trouble in Little China	John Carpenter	Kurt Russell, Kim Cattrall, Dennis Dun, James Hong	United States	Action adventure comedy
Biggles: Adventures in Time	John Hough	Neil Dickson, Alex Hyde-White, Fiona Hutchison, Peter Cushing	United Kingdom	
Castaway	Nicolas Roeg	Oliver Reed, Amanda Donohoe	United Kingdom	
Castle in the Sky	Hayao Miyazaki		Japan	Animated film, fantasy adventure
The Clan of the Cave Bear	Michael Chapman	Daryl Hannah, Pamela Reed, James Remar	United States	
The Climb	Donald Shebib	Bruce Greenwood, James Hurdle	Canada; United Kingdom	
Crocodile Dundee	Peter Faiman	Paul Hogan, Linda Kozlowski, Mark Blum, David Gulpilil, John Meillon, Michael Lombard, Reginald VelJohnson, Terry Gill, Steve Rackman, Gerry Skilton, David Bracks, Peter Turnbull, Caitlin Clarke, John Snyder, Anne Carlisle, Anne Francine, Paul Greco, Sullivan Walker	Australia; United States	
Firewalker	J. Lee Thompson	Chuck Norris, Louis Gossett Jr., Melody Anderson, Will Sampson, Sonny Landham, John Rhys-Davies, Ian Abercrombie, Richard Lee-Sung, Zaide Silvia Gutiérrez, Álvaro Carcaño, John Hazelwood, Dale Payne, José Escandón, Mário Arévalo, Miguel Fuentes	United States	
Florida Straits	Mike Hodges	Raúl Juliá, Fred Ward	United States	
The Golden Child	Michael Ritchie	Eddie Murphy, Charles Dance, Charlotte Lewis	United States	Adventure comedy
Goldy 2: The Saga of the Golden Bear	Robert Trevor Black	Jessica Black, Dan Dalton	United States	Adventure drama
Highlander	Russell Mulcahy	Christopher Lambert, Sean Connery, Clancy Brown, Roxanne Hart	United Kingdom; United States	Fantasy adventure
Jake Speed	Andrew Lane	Wayne Crawford, Dennis Christopher, Karen Kopins, John Hurt	United States	Adventure comedy
King Kong Lives	John Guillermin	Brian Kerwin, Linda Hamilton	United States	
Labyrinth	Jim Henson	Jennifer Connelly, David Bowie	United States	
Meglio baciare un cobra	Massimo Pirri	Andy J. Forest, Milly D'Abbraccio	Italy	
The Mines of Kilimanjaro	Mino Guerrini	Tobias Hoesl, Christopher Connelly, Elena Pompei, Gordon Mitchell	Italy	
Miracles	Jim Kouf	Tom Conti, Teri Garr, Paul Rodriguez, Christopher Lloyd	United States	Adventure comedy, romantic adventure
The Mission	Roland Joffé	Robert De Niro, Jeremy Irons	United Kingdom	
The Mosquito Coast	Peter Weir	Harrison Ford, Helen Mirren, River Phoenix	United States	Adventure drama
Pirates	Roman Polanski	Walter Matthau, Damien Thomas, Charlotte Lewis, Cris Campion	France; Tunisia	
Sarraounia	Med Hondo	Aï Keïta, Jean-Roger Milo, Féodor Atkine	Burkina Faso; Mauritania; France	
Shanghai Surprise	Jim Goddard	Sean Penn, Madonna, Paul Freeman	United Kingdom	
Sky Bandits	Zoran Perisic	Scott McGinnis, Jeff Osterhage	United Kingdom	
Sky Pirates	Colin Eggleston	John Hargreaves	Australia	
Solarbabies	Alan Johnson	Richard Jordan, Jami Gertz, Jason Patric	United States	
SpaceCamp	Harry Winer	Kate Capshaw, Lea Thompson, Kelly Preston	United States	Space adventure
Star Trek IV: The Voyage Home	Leonard Nimoy	William Shatner, Leonard Nimoy, DeForest Kelley	United States	
Tai-Pan	Daryl Duke	Bryan Brown, Joan Chen, Kyra Sedgwick	United States	
Toby McTeague	Jean-Claude Lord	Yannick Bisson, Winston Rekert	Canada	
Where the River Runs Black	Christopher Cain	Alessandro Rabelo, Charles Durning, Divana Brandão, Peter Horton	United States	

== 1987 ==
Title	Director	Cast	Country	Subgenre/Notes
The Adventure of the Action Hunters	Lee Bonner	Ronald Hunter, Sean Murphy	United States	
Alla ricerca dell'impero sepolto	Gianfranco Parolini	Bruno Minniti, Kelly London, Larry Silva	Italy; Philippines	
Armour of God	Jackie Chan, Eric Tsang	Jackie Chan, Alan Tam, Maria Dolores Forner	Hong Kong	Adventure comedy
The Barbarians	Ruggero Deodato	David Paul, Peter Paul, Richard Lynch	United States	Fantasy adventure
Benji the Hunted	Joe Camp	Benji, Red Steagall, Nancy Francis	United States	Family-oriented adventure
Captain James Cook	Lawrence Gordon Clark	Keith Michell, John Gregg	Australia; France	
Caribe	Michael Kennedy	John Savage, Kara Glover, Stephen McHattie	Canada	
Cayenne Palace	Alain Maline	Richard Berry, Jean Yanne, Anna Karina	France	
A Chinese Ghost Story	Ching Siu Tung	Leslie Cheung, Wong Tsu Hsien, Wu Ma	Hong Kong	Fantasy adventure
The Chipmunk Adventure	Janice Karman		United States	Animated film, family-oriented adventure
Cobra Verde	Werner Herzog	Klaus Kinski, King Ampaw, José Lewgoy	West Germany; Benin; Ghana	Adventure drama
Devil's Paradise	Vadim Glowna	Jürgen Prochnow, Sam Waterston, Suzanna Hamilton, Mario Adorf, Dominique Pinon	West Germany	
Down Twisted	Albert Pyun	Carey Lowell, Charles Rocket	United States	
Going Bananas	Boaz Davidson	Dom DeLuise, Herbert Lom	United States	Adventure comedy
Gor	Fritz Kiersch	Urbano Barberini, Rebecca Ferratti, Oliver Reed	United States; South Africa	
Hot Pursuit	Steven Lisberger	John Cusack, Robert Loggia	United States	Adventure comedy
Hotel Colonial	Cinzia TH Torrini	John Savage, Rachel Ward, Robert Duvall, Massimo Troisi	Italy; United States	
Ishtar	Elaine May	Warren Beatty, Dustin Hoffman, Isabelle Adjani	United States	Adventure comedy
Jane and the Lost City	Terry Marcel	Kirsten Hughes, Sam J. Jones, Maud Adams	United Kingdom	Adventure comedy
The Lighthorsemen	Simon Wincer	Jon Blake, Peter Phelps, Tony Bonner, Bill Kerr, John Walton, Gary Sweet, Tim McKenzie, Shane Briant, Serge Lazareff, Sigrid Thornton, Anthony Andrews, Ralph Cotterill, Patrick Frost, Anthony Hawkins, Gerard Kennedy, Jon Sidney, Graham Dow	Australia	War adventure
Lionheart	Franklin J. Schaffner	Eric Stoltz, Gabriel Byrne, Nicola Cowper, Dexter Fletcher, Deborah Moore, Nicholas Clay	United States	
The Living Daylights	John Glen	Timothy Dalton, Maryam d'Abo, Jeroen Krabbé, Joe Don Baker, John Rhys-Davies, Desmond Llewelyn, Robert Brown	United Kingdom	
Master of Dragonard Hill	Gérard Kikoïne	Patrick Warburton, Oliver Reed, Eartha Kitt, Herbert Lom	United Kingdom	
Masters of the Universe	Gary Goddard	Dolph Lundgren, Frank Langella, Meg Foster, Courteney Cox, Robert Duncan McNeill	United States	Fantasy adventure
Mio in the Land of Faraway	Vladimir Grammatikov	Christopher Lee, Christian Bale, Nicholas Pickard, Timothy Bottoms, Susannah York	Sweden; Soviet Union; Norway	Fantasy adventure
Our Man in the Jungle	Rudolf Steiner, Peter Stripp	Armin Mueller-Stahl, Katja Rupé	West Germany	
Pathfinder	Nils Gaup	Mikkel Gaup, Helgi Skúlason, Svein Scharffenberg	Norway	
The Princess Bride	Rob Reiner	Cary Elwes, Robin Wright, Mandy Patinkin	United States	
Race to Danger	Tommaso Dazzi	Franco Nero, Barbara De Rossi	Italy	
The Rogues	Mario Monicelli	Giancarlo Giannini, Enrico Montesano, Giuliana De Sio	Italy; Spain	
Straight to Hell	Alex Cox	Dick Rude, Sy Richardson, Courtney Love, Joe Strummer, Dennis Hopper, Grace Jones, Elvis Costello, Jim Jarmusch	United Kingdom; Spain; United States	
Superman IV: The Quest for Peace	Sidney J. Furie	Christopher Reeve, Gene Hackman, Jackie Cooper	United States	
Treasure of the Moon Goddess	José Luis García Agraz	Asher Brauner, Linnea Quigley, Don Calfa	United States; Mexico	
Ubac	Jean-Pierre Grasset	Richard Bohringer, Larry Lamb, Rufus, Pierre Malet	France	
White Water Summer	Jeff Bleckner	Kevin Bacon, Sean Astin	United States	Adventure drama
Yeelen	Souleyman Cisse	Issiaka Kane, Niamonto Sanogo	Mali; Burkina Faso; France	Adventure drama

== 1988 ==
Title	Director	Cast	Country	Subgenre/Notes
Ada in the Jungle	Gérard Zingg	Richard Bohringer, Victoria Abril, Isaach de Bankolé	France; Côte d'Ivoire	
The Adventures of Baron Munchausen	Terry Gilliam	John Neville, Sarah Polley, Eric Idle	United Kingdom	
Alien from L.A.	Albert Pyun	Kathy Ireland	United States; South Africa	Science fiction adventure
The Bear	Jean-Jacques Annaud	Tchéky Karyo, Jack Wallace	France	Adventure drama, family-oriented adventure
The Beast	Kevin Reynolds	George Dzundza, Jason Patric, Steven Bauer	United States	
Big Bird in Japan	Jon Stone	Caroll Spinney (voice), Brian Muehl (voice), Maiko Kawakami	Japan; United States	
The Big Blue	Luc Besson	Jean-Marc Barr, Jean Reno, Rosanna Arquette	France; United States	Romantic adventure, sea adventure
Bloodstone	Dwight H. Little	Brett Stimely, Anna Nicholas, Rajinikanth	United States; India	Action adventure
Captive Rage	Cedric Sundstrom	Oliver Reed, Robert Vaughn, Lisa Rinna	South Africa	
Chouans!	Philippe de Broca	Sophie Marceau, Philippe Noiret, Lambert Wilson, Jean-Pierre Cassel	France	
Crocodile Dundee II	John Cornell	Paul Hogan, Linda Kozlowski, John Meillon, Hechter Ubarry, Juan Fernández, Charles S. Dutton, Kenneth Welsh, Stephen Root, Dennis Boutsikaris, Ernie Dingo, Steve Rackman, Gerry Skilton, Gus Mercurio, Susie Essman, Colin Quinn, Luis Guzman, Alec Wilson, Jim Holt, Bill Sandy, Jace Alexander	Australia; United States	Adventure comedy
The Deceivers	Nicholas Meyer	Pierce Brosnan, Saeed Jaffrey, Shashi Kapoor	India; United Kingdom; United States	Adventure drama
El Dorado	Carlos Saura	Omero Antonutti, Lambert Wilson	Spain; France	Adventure drama
The Firing Line	Jun Gallardo	Reb Brown, Shannon Tweed	United States; Philippines	War adventure
The Further Adventures of Tennessee Buck	David Keith	David Keith, Kathy Shower, Brant Van Hoffman	United States	Adventure comedy
The Gamble	Carlo Vanzina	Matthew Modine, Faye Dunaway, Jennifer Beals	Italy	
The Gods Must Be Crazy 2	Jamie Uys	N!xau, Lena Farugia, Hans Strydom	South Africa; United States; Botswana	Adventure comedy
Gorillas in the Mist	Michael Apted	Sigourney Weaver, Bryan Brown, Julie Harris	United States; Zaire; Rwanda	Adventure drama
The Great Outdoors	Howard Deutch	John Candy, Dan Aykroyd	United States	Adventure comedy
Laggiù nella giungla	Stefano Reali	Tony Vogel, Robert Powell, Van Johnson, Andréa Ferréol, Anna Galiena	Italy	
The Land Before Time	Don Bluth	Pat Hingle (voice), Gabriel Damon (voice), Candace Hutson (voice), Judith Barsi (voice), Will Ryan (voice)	United States	Adventure Animated
The Lion of Africa	Kevin Connor	Brian Dennehy, Brooke Adams	United States	
Mercenary Fighters	Riki Shelach Nissimoff	Peter Fonda, Reb Brown, Ron O'Neal, James Mitchum	United States	
My Neighbor Totoro	Hayao Miyazaki	Chika Sakamoto (voice), Noriko Hidaka (voice), Hitoshi Takagi (voice)	Japan	Animated film, family-oriented adventure
Natura contro	Antonio Climati	Marco Merlo, Fabrizio Merlo, May Deseligny	Italy	
The Navigator: A Medieval Odyssey	Vincent Ward	Bruce Lyons, Chris Haywood, Hamish McFarlane	Australia; New Zealand	Fantasy adventure
Outlaw of Gor	John Cardos	Urbano Barberini, Rebecca Ferratti, Jack Palance	United States; South Africa	Fantasy adventure
Rambo III	Peter MacDonald	Sylvester Stallone, Richard Crenna	United States	War adventure
The Rescue	Ferdinand Fairfax	Kevin Dillon, Marc Price, Ned Vaughn	United States	
Space Mutiny	David Winters, Neal Sundstorm	Reb Brown, John Phillip Law, James Ryan	United States	Space adventure
Tusks	Tara Moore	John Rhys-Davies, Andrew Stevens, Lucy Gutteridge, Julian Glover	United States	
Vibes	Ken Kwapis	Jeff Goldblum, Cyndi Lauper, Peter Falk	United States	Romantic adventure, adventure comedy
Willow	Ron Howard	Val Kilmer, Joanne Whalley, Warwick Davis	United States; United Kingdom	Fantasy adventure

== 1989 ==
Title	Director	Cast	Country	Subgenre/Notes
The Abyss	James Cameron	Ed Harris, Mary Elizabeth Mastrantonio, Michael Biehn	United States	
The Adventures of Milo and Otis	Masanori Hata	Dudley Moore (narrator)	Japan; United States	Family-oriented adventure
African Timber	Peter F. Bringmann	Heiner Lauterbach, Deborah Lacey, Julien Guiomar, Dietmar Schönherr	West Germany	
Babar: The Movie	Alan Bunce		Canada; France	Animated film, family-oriented adventure
Back to the Future Part II	Robert Zemeckis	Michael J. Fox, Christopher Lloyd, Lea Thompson	United States	
Batman	Tim Burton	Michael Keaton, Jack Nicholson, Kim Basinger	United States	
Bill & Ted's Excellent Adventure	Stephen Herek	Keanu Reeves, Alex Winter, George Carlin	United States	
Cheetah	Jeff Blyth	Keith Coogan, Lucy Deakins	United States	
Crusoe	Caleb Deschanel	Aidan Quinn, Adé Sapara, Elvis Payne	United States; United Kingdom	
Erik the Viking	Terry Jones	Tim Robbins, Gary Cady, Mickey Rooney	United Kingdom; United States	Fantasy adventure
Farewell to the King	John Milius	Nick Nolte	United States	War adventure
Indiana Jones and the Last Crusade	Steven Spielberg	Harrison Ford, Sean Connery, Denholm Elliott	United States	Adventure comedy
Indio	Antonio Margheriti	Francesco Quinn, Marvelous Marvin Hagler, Brian Dennehy	Italy	
Jewel of the Gods	Robert Van der Coolwijk	Marius Weyers, Sandra Prinsloo	South Africa	
Joan of Arc of Mongolia	Ulrike Ottinger	Delphine Seyrig, Irm Hermann, Peter Kern	West Germany; France	Romantic adventure
The Lady and the Highwayman	John Hough	Hugh Grant, Oliver Reed, Michael York, Claire Bloom, Lysette Anthony, Emma Samms, Robert Morley	United Kingdom	
Marrakech Express	Gabriele Salvatores	Diego Abatantuono, Fabrizio Bentivoglio, Cristina Marsillach	Italy	
Nostos: The Return	Franco Piavoli	Luigi Mezzanotte	Italy	
Old Gringo	Luis Puenzo	Jane Fonda, Gregory Peck, Jimmy Smits	United States	
The Return of the Musketeers	Richard Lester	Michael York, Oliver Reed, Richard Chamberlain, Frank Finlay, Christopher Lee, Kim Cattrall, Geraldine Chaplin, Philippe Noiret, C. Thomas Howell	France; Spain; United Kingdom	
River of Death	Steve Carver	Michael Dudikoff, Robert Vaughn, Donald Pleasence, Herbert Lom, L. Q. Jones	United States	
The Secret of the Ice Cave	Radu Gabrea	Sally Kellerman, Michael Moriarty	United States	Family-oriented adventure
Sinbad of the Seven Seas	Enzo G. Castellari	Lou Ferrigno	Italy	Fantasy adventure
Slipstream	Steven Lisberger	Mark Hamill, Kitty Aldridge, Bill Paxton, Bob Peck, Ben Kingsley, F. Murray Abraham	United States	Science fiction adventure
Star Trek V: The Final Frontier	William Shatner	William Shatner, Leonard Nimoy, DeForest Kelley	United States	
