= Cannibal Ferox =

1981 film by Umberto Lenzi

- Theatrical release poster
- Directed by: Umberto Lenzi
- Screenplay by: Umberto Lenzi
- Produced by: Mino Loy; Luciano Martino
- Starring: Giovanni Lombardo Radice; Lorraine De Selle; Danilo Mattei; Zora Kerowa; Robert Kerman; John Bartha; Walter Lucchini; Fiamma Maglione; Venantino Venantini
- Cinematography: Giovanni Bergamini
- Edited by: Enzo Meniconi
- Music by: Roberto Donati; Fiamma Maglione
- Production companies: Dania Film; Medusa Distribuzione; National Cinematografica
- Distributed by: Medusa Distribuzione (Italy)
- Release date: 24 April 1981 (Italy)
- Running time: 93 minutes 83 minutes (censored)
- Country: Italy
- Languages: Italian; Spanish; English

Cannibal Ferox (also known as Make Them Die Slowly in the US and as Woman from Deep River in Australia) is a 1981 Italian cannibal horror film written and directed by Umberto Lenzi, and starring Giovanni Lombardo Radice, Lorraine De Selle, Danilo Mattei, Zora Kerova and Robert Kerman.

Upon release, the film's US distributor claimed it was "the most violent film ever made". Cannibal Ferox was also dubiously claimed to be "banned in 31 countries". The title derives from the Latin ferox, meaning cruel, wild or ferocious.

== Plot ==
In Colombia, siblings Rudy and Gloria, and their friend Pat, prepare for a journey into the rainforest. They plan to prove Gloria's theory that cannibalism is a myth. The trio encounters a drug dealer named Mike and his business partner, Joe. Joe is badly wounded; Mike explains that cannibals attacked them. Gloria goes missing at night, and Rudy finds a native village while looking for her.

Due to Joe's injuries, the travelers stay in the nearly deserted village. Mike seduces the naive Pat. In a cocaine-fueled rage, he encourages Pat to kill a native girl. She refuses, so Mike kills the girl himself. In his dying moments, Joe reveals that he and Mike were responsible for the cannibals' aggression. They came to the region to exploit the natives for emeralds and cocaine, taking advantage of their trust in white men. One day, while high on cocaine, Mike brutally tortured and killed their native guide in full view of the tribe including cutting off his genitalia. A badly charred body, previously believed to be that of a different guide, is this native. Mike kidnapped a native girl to lead them out of the jungle, but the outsiders were followed and attacked.

After the murder of the native girl, the cannibals finally snap and hunt the outsiders. When Joe dies of his wounds, the natives find his body and cannibalize it. Rudy and Gloria watch on, hidden from the natives. Mike and Pat abandon the others, but all are captured by the natives and forced into a cage. The prisoners are forced to watch Mike as he is tortured, beaten, including having his penis severed with a large machete and then eaten by a native villager as revenge against Mike killing and castrating their fellow village mate. The natives transport their prisoners to another village, but Rudy escapes. He is caught in a booby trap in the jungle, and his bleeding wounds attract piranhas. He begs the natives to help him. The natives euthanize him with a poisoned dart.

Pat and Gloria are put in a hole in the ground. Mike is placed in a separate cage. A native man, whom Pat had saved from Mike's aggression, lowers a rope into the hole so the women can escape. Mike digs out of the cage, chases the man away, and cuts the rope, preventing the woman from escaping. Mike flees into the jungle, where he tries to attract a search-and-rescue plane's attention, but he is recaptured. The natives sever one of his hands and drag him back to the village. The search plane lands, but the natives tell the rescuers that the outsiders' canoes capsized in the river and crocodiles ate them.

As the search team leaves, Pat is bound, stripped to the waist, and the natives run hooks through her breasts to be hung by them. Gloria can only watch as Pat dies a slow and painful death. Meanwhile, Mike's head is locked in a crude contraption, and the top of his skull is cut off so that the natives can eat his exposed brain. During the night, the sympathetic native returns and frees Gloria. He guides her through the jungle but falls victim to one of the natives' booby traps. Gloria eventually encounters a pair of trappers who take her to safety. Instead of telling the truth, she recounts the natives' lie that the others were eaten by crocodiles.

Gloria, deeply disturbed by her experiences, returns to civilization. She publishes a book titled, Cannibalism: End of a Myth, which lies to support her theory and covers up the events of her ordeal.

== Cast ==
- Giovanni Lombardo Radice as Mike Logan (as John Morghen)
- Lorraine De Selle as Gloria Davis
- Danilo Mattei as Rudy Davis (as Bryan Redford)
- Zora Kerova as Pat Johnson (as Zora Kerowa)
- Walter Lucchini as Joe Costolani (as Walter Lloyd)
- Robert Kerman as Lt. Rizzo
- Fiamma Maglione as Myrna Stenn (as Meg Fleming)
- John Bartha as Mobster
- Venantino Venantini as Sgt. Ross
- Miguel Ángel 'El Indio' Rincón as Juanito

Uncredited

- Dominic Raacke as Tim Barrett
- Perry Pirkkanen as Paul, mobster
- Jake Teague as Professor
- Riccardo Petrazzi as Hunter

== Background ==
Cannibal Ferox was produced as part of the "cannibal boom" of Italian exploitation cinema during the 1970s and 1980s. In a 2015 interview, Ruggero Deodato identified the film as a knockoff of his own Cannibal Holocaust (1980) — the two films share a similar plot and many cast members and locations. However, Umberto Lenzi claimed that Deodato's film had copied his own, earlier film Man from the Deep River (1972), which is often credited with starting the cannibal boom.

Lenzi directed the film back-to-back with another cannibal film, Eaten Alive! (1980), which also featured actor Robert Kerman.

== Production ==
Filming took place on-location in Leticia, Amazonas, Colombia and New York City, with some interior scenes shot at Elios Studios in Rome.

Actor Giovanni Lombardo Radice was highly-critical of the film, considering his character one-dimensional and objecting to the unsimulated animal violence. During filming, Radice refused to participate in a scene where his character slaughtered a pig. Lenzi said "[Robert De Niro] would do it," to which the actor responded "De Niro would kick your ass all the way back to Rome." In the end, the scene was performed by a body double. Radice used a stage name, "John Morghen", to disassociate himself from the film, but admitted in later years that it had brought him many fans from across the world.

The film was scored by Fiamma Maglione (who also appears in the film as Myrna) and Roberto "Budy" Donati, and arranged and directed by Carlo Maria Cordio.

== Release ==
Cannibal Ferox was released in Italy on 24 April 1981.

Terry Levene's Aquarius Releasing opened the film in NYC in September 1983 under the title "Make Them Die Slowly". Levene's assistant, Ron Harvey, explained to Fangoria magazine that the box-office success of the "Mondo" documentary "Savage Man, Savage Beast" had inspired the company to seek out a similar property, but one aligned with a fictional narrative. Aquarius' marketing strategy was minimal: a sensational, gratuitously violent trailer (narrated, in a break from tradition, by a woman, in order to provide a jarring counterpoint to the grotesque imagery), no print ads, and the marquee of the Liberty Theatre on 42nd Street completely emblazoned with huge, garish banners and colour stills announcing the film. Harvey further remarked that, although the film was hugely successful at venues that would play it, most cinemas shunned the film - he approximated there were probably only 100 theatres nationwide in which it could play.

=== Home media ===
Cannibal Ferox was released uncut on video in the UK circa 1982 by Replay, but the film's transgressive imagery and scenes of real animal cruelty resulted in the film promptly being banned under the Obscene Publications Act, finding itself languishing for years on the video nasties list. (In 1983, Replay issued a cut version, based on informal suggestions from the BBFC, bearing an 'advisory', and consequently without legal standing, '18' certificate. These efforts were to little avail, since this version was also effectively banned by the VRA). Early DVD versions available in the UK were missing 6 minutes of footage (chiefly graphic violence and animal cruelty), which had been cut before being submitted to the BBFC for a rating. The full version of the film was submitted to the board in 2018 and again received 2 minutes of cuts to the animal violence.

In Australia, where it was released as Woman from Deep River, the film also faced censorship issues, being given numerous censored releases. In 2005, the uncut version was released on DVD by Siren Visual under the title Cannibal Ferox.

In the USA, Cannibal Ferox's (a.k.a. Make Them Die Slowly) "original, uncensored director's cut" was released by Grindhouse Releasing in the late 1990s. Grindhouse remains the sole officially licensed distributor of the film in North America. On 22 May 2015, Grindhouse released the film in a 3 Disc Blu-ray/DVD feature, the film's first time on Blu-ray Disc. The Blu-ray featured the documentary film Eaten Alive! The Rise and Fall of the Italian Cannibal Film and a 12-page booklet.

== Critical reception ==
The film had mixed reception on its airplay. On Rotten Tomatoes, the film has a 40% approval rating, based on five reviews. AllMovie called the film "revolting," but "nauseatingly effective," though noting that it is "primarily a showcase for the gory special-effects artistry of Giannetto De Rossi." (Note: Gianetto De Rossi did not actually work on Cannibal Ferox. The makeup effects artist on the film was Giuseppe Ferranti. The confusion arises from the fact that the film's special effects artist is named Gino De Rossi, who is not related to Gianetto De Rossi.) Some critics criticized the film for its depictions of animal abuse, the poor acting and lines, and sexism.

== See also ==
- Video nasty
- Cannibal Holocaust
