= Perry Pirkanen =

American actor

Perry Pirkkanen is an American actor. He is best known for starring in the 1980 Italian cannibal film Cannibal Holocaust. He also starred in Umberto Lenzi's cannibal movie Cannibal Ferox. In Cannibal Holocaust, Pirkkanen – whose surname is Finnish – is erroneously credited as 'Perry Pirkanen'. Pirkkanen, then a student at New York City's Actors Studio, was hired by director Ruggero Deodato who was looking for unknown actors to play the film's four main characters. In the film, he was in an infamous scene where he butchered a large turtle. He is even seen holding the turtle's head next to his mouth. However, after filming the scene, he cried and had an emotional breakdown off camera.

He has also starred in the play Perfect Crime as the original inspector Ascher.

== Filmography ==
- Cannibal Holocaust (1980) as Jack Anders
- City of the Living Dead (1980) as The Blond Gravedigger
- Cannibal Ferox (1981) as Paul (uncredited)
- Cruel Jaws (1995; unconfirmed; uncredited)
- Lunamancer (2021)

== See also ==
- Carl Gabriel Yorke
- Francesca Ciardi
- Luca Barbareschi
