= All'ultimo minuto =

- Also known as: At the Last Minute
- Country of origin: Italy
- Original language: Italian
- No. of seasons: 3

Original release
- Network: RAI
- Release: 1971 – 1973

All'ultimo minuto is an Italian television series produced by RAI and Editoriale Aurora TV, which was directed by Ruggero Deodato.

Three seasons were produced from 1971 to 1973.

== Plot ==
In each episode, one or more people found themselves trapped in an apparently unresolved situation, which is instead resolved (as the series title states) at the last minute.

== See also ==
- List of Italian television series
