= Phantom of Death =

1988 film directed by Ruggero Deodato

- Italian: Un delitto poco comune
- Directed by: Ruggero Deodato
- Screenplay by: Gigliola Battagnini; Vincenzo Mannino; Gianfranco Clerici
- Story by: Vincenzo Mannino; Gianfranco Clerici
- Produced by: Pietro Innocenzi
- Starring: Michael York; Donald Pleasence; Edwige Fenech
- Cinematography: Giorgio Di Battista
- Edited by: Daniele Alabiso
- Music by: Pino Donaggio
- Production company: Globe Film; Tandem Cinematografica; Reteitalia
- Distributed by: Distribuzione Lanciamento Film
- Release date: 11 March 1988 (Italy)
- Running time: 92 minutes
- Country: Italy

Phantom of Death (Italian: Un delitto poco comune, lit. 'An Uncommon Crime'; also released as Off Balance) is a 1988 Italian giallo film directed by Ruggero Deodato and starring Michael York, Edwige Fenech and Donald Pleasence. The film is about a pianist (York) suffering from a genetic condition that causes rapid aging, which drives him mad and leads to a killing spree.

== Plot ==
On the same day that 35-year-old concert pianist Robert Dominici achieves great success with his performance, a doctor is brutally murdered. Shortly thereafter, his young girlfriend, Susanna, is also murdered alongside her lover Davide. Police Inspector Datti receives a phone call from the killer, who threatens his daughter.

Dominici, distraught over Susanna's violent death, has a fling with a woman named Hélène, which results in her becoming pregnant. After visiting his mother in Venice, he attacks a man who mocked his appearance. It emerges that Dominici suffers from incurable progeria, a genetic condition that causes him to physically age at a rapid pace. He is in fact the killer, driven to madness and rage by his illness, which causes sudden physical and mental changes.

Dominici subsequently kills a prostitute and a police officer, all the while taunting Datti over the phone. His rapid aging helps cover his tracks, as his continuously-changing appearance makes him hard to pin down. Dominici tries to kill Hélène, not wanting his child to carry his illness. However, he succumbs to his condition before he can, dying in front of her.

== Cast ==
- Michael York as Robert Dominici
- Donald Pleasence as Inspector Datti
- Edwige Fenech as Hélène Martell
- Mapi Galan as Susanna
- Fabio Sartor as Davide
- Renato Cortesi as Officer Marchi
- Antonella Ponziani as Gloria Datti
- Carola Stagnaro as Dr. Carla Pesenti
- Daniele Brado as Dr. Vanni
- Caterina Boratto as Mrs. Dominici
- Renata Dal Pozzo as Officer Corsi
- Giovanni Lombardo Radice as Father Giuliano
- Marino Masè as Gerontologist
- Loris Loddi as Danzi
- Raffaella Baracchi as Laura
- Haruhiko Yamanouchi as Swordmaster

== Production ==
Phantom of Death had a script developed in the early 1980s by Gianfranco Clerici and Vincenzo Mannino which later became the basis for the script for Lucio Fulci's The New York Ripper (1982). According to Clerici, the two were offended by how their script was changed and continued to edit it before giving it to director Ruggero Deodato. Parts of the story that were used in The New York Ripper remain in the film, such as the killer who disguises their voice and taunts the police.

Deodato has stated that "I did Phantom of Death because it was based on a true element – the idea of growing old [...] And I got to work with Michael York and Donald Pleasence." On the film as a whole, he commented that "some parts look like an 'A' production. But it seemed too long in the final part." He added that Edwige Fenech was miscast (his first choice was Kelly LeBrock), and was only included because the producer wanted her in the film.

== Release ==
The film was released in 1988. According to film critic and historian Roberto Curti, the film has "passable box-office" results.

=== Home media ===
The film was released in Germany on home video as Off Balance - Der Tod wartet in Venedig and in Holland and Belgium as an English-language version as Off Balance. In the United States, it was released by Vidmark as Phantom of Death. It has received further DVD releases on home video by Shameless as Phantom of Death.

The film was released on Blu-Ray by Cauldron Films in August 2023.

== Reception ==
From contemporary reviews, "Lor." of Variety commented that the film had "little suspense". The review noted that York had "solid thesping which engenders some pathos for the central figure" and added that Pino Donaggio's score was "lush".

In his book Blood & Black Lace (1999), dedicated to Italian horror and sex films, Adrian Luther Smith described the film as an "unexpectedly thoughtful production", and a "austere horror/giallo hybrid", finding it having a strong cast and "some choice moments of gore." Curti wrote in his book Italian Giallo in Film and Television that the film was "somewhat slow" but was "graced by the director's capable technique".
