= Cannibal Holocaust =

1980 Italian horror film directed by Ruggero Deodato

- Italian theatrical release poster
- Directed by: Ruggero Deodato
- Written by: Gianfranco Clerici
- Produced by: Franco Di Nunzio; Franco Palaggi
- Starring: Robert Kerman; Carl Gabriel Yorke; Francesca Ciardi; Luca Barbareschi; Perry Pirkanen
- Cinematography: Sergio D'Offizi
- Edited by: Vincenzo Tomassi
- Music by: Riz Ortolani
- Production company: F.D. Cinematografica
- Distributed by: United Artists Europa
- Release date: 7 February 1980
- Running time: 96 minutes
- Country: Italy
- Language: Italian; English (Note: Like most Italian productions of the time, Cannibal Holocaust was filmed MOS (without live sync-sound), with a mix of Italian and American cast. It was then dubbed into wholly-Italian and English-language versions. See casting.)
- Budget: US$100,000

Cannibal Holocaust is a 1980 Italian cannibal film directed by Ruggero Deodato and written by Gianfranco Clerici. It stars Robert Kerman as Harold Monroe, an anthropologist who leads a rescue team into the Amazon rainforest to locate a crew of filmmakers that have gone missing while filming a documentary on local cannibal tribes.

Produced as part of the contemporary cannibal trend of Italian exploitation cinema, Cannibal Holocaust was inspired by Italian media coverage of the Red Brigades' terrorism. Deodato believed the news reports to be staged, an idea that became an integral aspect of the film's story. Additional story elements were also influenced by the Mondo documentaries of Gualtiero Jacopetti, particularly the presentation of the documentary crew's lost footage, which constitutes approximately half of the film. The treatment of this footage, which is noted for its visual realism, innovated the found footage style of filmmaking that was later popularized in American cinema by The Blair Witch Project. Cannibal Holocaust was filmed primarily on location in the Amazon rainforest of Colombia with a cast of mostly inexperienced American and Italian actors interacting with actual indigenous peoples.

Cannibal Holocaust achieved notoriety as its graphic violence aroused a great deal of controversy. After its premiere in Italy, it was ordered to be seized by a local magistrate. Deodato, screenwriter Gianfranco Clerici, and producers Francesco Palaggi, Alda Pia, and Franco Di Nunzio were convicted of obscenity. The film was released from seizure in 1982. It was banned in the United Kingdom, Ireland, Australia, New Zealand, South Africa, Canada and several other countries because of its graphic content, including sexual assault and genuine violence toward animals. Although some nations have since revoked the ban, it is still upheld in several countries. Critical reception of the film is mixed, although it has received a cult following. The film's plot and violence have been noted as commentary on journalistic ethics, the exploitation of South American countries, and the difference between Western and non-Western cultures, yet these interpretations have also been met with criticism, with any perceived subtext deemed hypocritical or insincere because of the film's presentation.

== Plot ==
In 1979, an American film crew—director Alan Yates, script supervisor Faye Daniels, cameramen Jack Anders and Mark Tomaso, and native guide Felipe—disappear into the Amazon rainforest while filming The Green Inferno, a documentary about indigenous cannibal tribes.

Harold Monroe, an anthropologist at NYU, agrees to lead a rescue mission for the missing filmmakers. Before his arrival, military personnel stationed in the rainforest conduct a raid on the local Yacumo tribe and take a young man hostage to negotiate with the natives. Monroe flies in via floatplane and meets his guides, Chaco and Miguel.

While trekking through the jungle, they find Felipe's skeleton and Chaco force-feeds the hostage cocaine to keep him pliable. They secretly watch a native man murder a woman as punishment for adultery; Chaco forbids Monroe to intervene. The team follows the man to a group of Yacumo and promises to release their hostage in exchange for being taken to the Yacumo village. Once there, the group is greeted with hostility and learns that the filmmakers caused great unrest among the people.

The next day, Monroe and his guides head deeper into the rainforest to locate two warring endocannibal tribes, the Ya̧nomamö and the Shamatari. They follow a group of Shamatari warriors to a riverbank, where Monroe's team saves a smaller group of Ya̧nomamö from death. The Ya̧nomamö invite the team back to their village in gratitude but remain suspicious of the foreigners. Monroe bathes naked in a river to gain their trust, where a group of Ya̧nomamö women joins him. The woman leads Monroe from the river to a shrine, where he discovers the filmmakers' skeletal remains along with their film reels and realizes that the film crew were exocannibalized. He later plays music from a tape recorder for the Ya̧nomamö in the village, hoping they will trade it for the film reels; the natives are intrigued and agree.

Monroe returns to NYC, where Pan American Broadcasting System executives invite him to host a documentary broadcast based on the recovered film. Monroe insists on viewing the raw footage before agreeing. One of the executives introduces him to Alan's work by showing an excerpt from his previous documentary, The Last Road to Hell, after which she informs Monroe that Alan staged dramatic scenes to make his films more exciting.

Monroe begins to view the recovered footage, which follows the group's journey through the rainforest. After walking for days, Felipe is bitten by a venomous snake. They amputate his leg with a machete to save him, but he dies and is left behind. Upon locating the Yacumo in a clearing, Jack shoots one in the leg so they can easily follow him to the village. Once they arrive, the crew proceeds to intimidate the tribe and kill a child's pet pig before herding the natives into a hut, which they burn down to stage a massacre for their film. Monroe expresses apprehension about the staged footage and the treatment of the natives, but his concerns are ignored.

After viewing the remaining footage, Monroe is disgusted by the station's decision to air the documentary and shows the executives the unedited footage he alone has seen to convince them otherwise. The final two reels begin with the filmmakers gang-raping a Ya̧nomamö girl against Faye's protests, silently watched from afar by a Ya̧nomamö man. They later encounter the same girl impaled on a wooden pole by a riverbank, where they claim that the natives killed her for her loss of virginity before marriage. (Note: It is suggested that the group themselves killed her and staged it as a murder by the natives for dramatic effect. This is left ambiguous in the footage.)

Shortly afterward, they are vengefully attacked by the Ya̧nomamö tribe. A spear hits Jack, and Alan shoots him to prevent his escape. The natives begin undressing Jack's lifeless body and then cutting off his penis with a large machete before mutilating his corpse. An exhausted Alan admits they got lost while trying to escape and are now surrounded by the natives, whom he attempts to scare off with a flare gun. Faye is captured by the Ya̧nomamö. Alan insists they rescue her, but Mark continues filming as she is stripped, gang-raped, beaten to death, and beheaded. The Ya̧nomamö then locate and kill the last two team members as the camera falls to the ground. Disturbed, the executives order all the footage to be burned. Monroe leaves the station, pondering "who the real cannibals are".

== Cast ==
- Robert Kerman as Professor Harold Monroe
- Carl Gabriel Yorke as Alan Yates
- Luca Giorgio Barbareschi as Mark Tomaso
- Francesca Ciardi as Faye Daniels
- Perry Pirkanen as Jack Anders
- Salvatore Basile as Chaco
- Ricardo Fuentes
- Paolo Paoloni as Executive
- Lionello Pio Di Savoia as Executive
- Luigina Rocchi

Uncredited

- Kate Weiman as Executive
- Enrico Papa as TV Interviewer
- David Sage as Mr. Yates
- Ruggero Deodato as Man on University Campus

== Production ==
=== Development ===
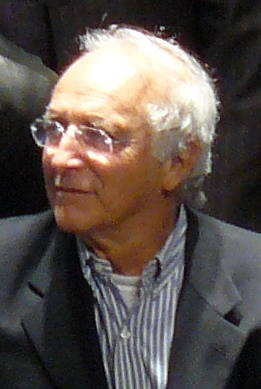
Director Ruggero Deodato

Production on Cannibal Holocaust began in 1979, when director Ruggero Deodato was contacted by West German film distributors to make a film similar to his previous work, Last Cannibal World. He accepted the project and immediately set out to find a producer, choosing his friend Francesco Palaggi. The two first flew to Colombia to scout filming locations. Leticia was chosen as the principal filming location after Deodato met a Colombian documentary filmmaker at the airport in Bogotá, who suggested the town as a location ideal for filming. Other locations had been considered, specifically those where Gillo Pontecorvo's Burn! had been shot, but Deodato rejected these locations because of a lack of suitable rainforest.

Deodato conceived the film's premise while talking to his son about news coverage of the Red Brigades' terrorism. Deodato thought the media focused on portraying violence with little regard for journalistic integrity and believed journalists staged certain news angles to obtain more sensational footage. The Italian media was symbolized by the behavior in the film team in Cannibal Holocaust, the depiction of whom was also influenced by the works of Gualtiero Jacopetti, a documentary filmmaker of whom Deodato was a fan. Jacopetti and his partner, Franco Prosperi, are credited with popularizing Mondo films, a genre of documentary, with their first release, Mondo cane. Mondo films focused on sensational and graphic content from around the world, including local customs, violence, sexuality, and death. Deodato included similar content in Cannibal Holocaust, such as graphic violence and animal death, and the documentary that is produced in Cannibal Holocaust resembles a Mondo film. The scene of Monroe bathing naked in a river and the scene of a forced abortion rite have also been noted as being similar to scenes in Antonio Climati's Mondo film Savana violenta.

The Italian screenwriter Gianfranco Clerici wrote the script under the working title I figli della luna (The Sons of the Moon). He had collaborated with Deodato in his previous films Ultimo mondo cannibale and The House on the Edge of the Park, the latter of which was filmed before Cannibal Holocaust but released afterward. The screenplay included multiple scenes that did not make the film's final cut, including one in which a group of Ya̧nomamö cuts off the leg of a Shamatari warrior and feeds it to piranhas in a river. This scene was to take place directly after Monroe's team rescues a smaller group of Ya̧nomamö from the Shamatari. Attempts were made to film this scene, but the underwater camera did not operate properly, and the piranha were difficult to control. As a result, Deodato abandoned his efforts, and still photographs taken during the scene's setup are its only known depiction. The originally scripted version of The Last Road to Hell, which was written to depict soldiers advancing upon an enemy position, also went unused, as Deodato instead decided to use stock footage of political executions for the segment in order to draw further parallels to the films of Jacopetti. The character names Mark Williams and Shanda Tommaso in Clerici's screenplay were also changed to Mark Tomaso and Faye Daniels, respectively, in the film.

=== Casting ===
Deodato decided to film Cannibal Holocaust in English to appeal to a wider audience and lend the film credibility. There is one scene in Spanish, about seven minutes in, for which the subtitles vary in different versions of the film. However, the film had to establish a European nationality so that it could be more easily distributed among European countries. Under Italian law, for the film to be recognized as Italian, at least two actors who spoke Italian as a native language had to star in the film. Luca Giorgio Barbareschi and Francesca Ciardi, two inexperienced students from the Actors Studio in NYC, were cast as Mark Tomaso and Faye Daniels, respectively, in part because they were native Italian speakers who also spoke English. Deodato also hired an American from the Actors Studio, Perry Pirkkanen, to play Jack Anders.

A friend of Pirkkanen was initially cast to play Alan Yates, but he dropped out of the film shortly before the production team left for the Amazon. He instead appears in the film as an ex-colleague of Yates. Casting director Bill Williams subsequently contacted Carl Gabriel Yorke to play the role. Yorke, a stage actor who had studied under Uta Hagen, was chosen in part because he was the right size for the costumes and boots, which had already been purchased. Because Cannibal Holocaust was a non-union production, Yorke originally wanted to be credited under the stage name Christopher Savage, although he ultimately decided it to be unnecessary because of the film's obscurity and remote filming location.

Robert Kerman had years of experience working in adult films under the pseudonym R. Bolla, including the well-known Debbie Does Dallas, before breaking into the Italian film industry. Kerman was recommended to Deodato for his previous film, The Concorde Affair, in which Kerman played an air traffic controller, and his performance impressed Deodato enough to have Kerman cast as Harold Monroe in Cannibal Holocaust. Kerman went on to star in the Italian cannibal films Eaten Alive! and Cannibal Ferox, both directed by Umberto Lenzi. Kerman's then-girlfriend Kate Weiman was cast as one of the station executives, as she was available to film in both New York City and Rome.

=== Direction ===
Film historian David Kerekes contends that the film's sense of reality is based on the direction and the treatment of the film team's recovered footage, noting that the "shaky hand-held camerawork commands a certain realism, and 'The Green Inferno,' the ill-fated team's film-within-a-film here, is no exception", and that "this very instability gives the 'Green Inferno' film its authentic quality." David Carter of the cult horror webzine Savage Cinema says that Deodato's methods added a first-person narration quality to the film team's footage, writing: "The viewer feels as if they are there with the crew, experiencing the horrors with them." Deodato was proud of other aspects of the cinematography, namely the numerous moving shots using a standard, shoulder-mounted camera, forgoing the use of a steadicam.

Kerekes noted the animal slaughter and inclusion of footage from The Last Road to Hell as adding to the sense of reality of the film. Lloyd Kaufman of Troma Entertainment compares these scenes to Vsevolod Pudovkin's theory of montage, saying: "In Cannibal Holocaust, we see the actors kill and rip apart a giant sea turtle and other animals. [...] The brain has been conditioned to accept that which it's now seeing as real. This mixture of real and staged violence, combined with the handheld camerawork and the rough, unedited quality of the second half of the movie, is certainly enough to convince someone that what they are watching is real." Deodato says he included the execution footage in The Last Road to Hell to draw further similarities to Cannibal Holocaust and the Mondo filmmaking of Gualtiero Jacopetti.

=== Filming ===
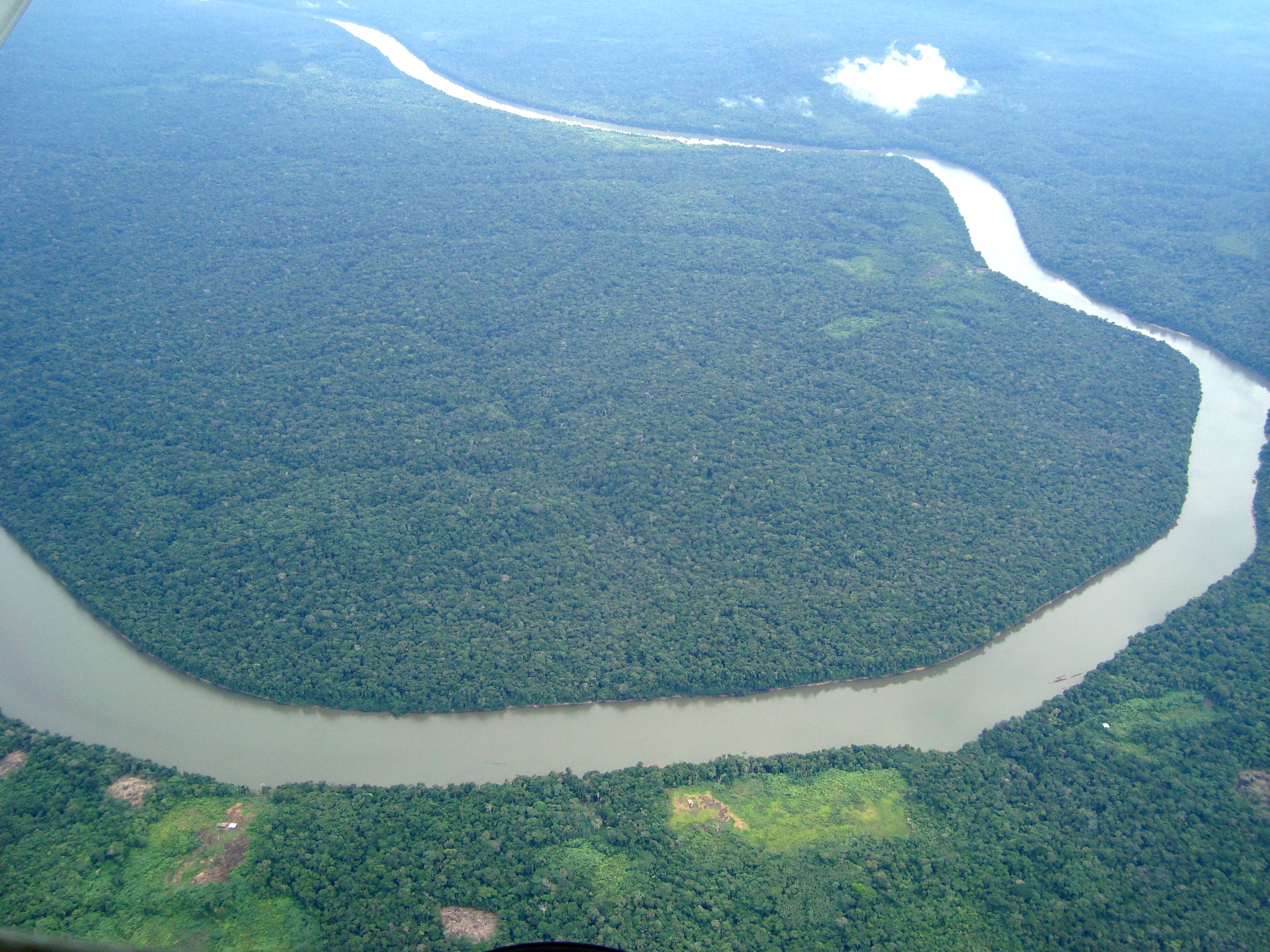
Cannibal Holocaust was filmed mainly in the Amazon rainforest in Colombia.

Principal photography began on 4 June 1979. The scenes featuring the film team were shot first with handheld 16mm cameras in a cinéma vérité style that mimicked an observational documentary, a technique Deodato had learned from his mentor Roberto Rossellini. This same style was also used by Climati in his Mondo film Ultime grida dalla savana, which may have been influential on Deodato's direction. After shooting with the film team was completed, Kerman flew down to film his scenes in the rainforest and then to NYC to film exterior shots in the city. Leticia was only accessible by aircraft, and from there, the cast and crew had to travel by boat to reach the set. The interior shots of NYC were filmed later in a studio in Rome.

Production on the film was repeatedly delayed while in the Amazon. After the actor originally cast as Alan Yates dropped out of the role, filming was halted for two weeks until new casting calls were completed and Yorke arrived in Leticia. During principal filming with Kerman, the father of the actor who played Miguel was murdered, and production was again halted as the actor flew back to Bogotá to attend his father's funeral. The locale also presented problems for the production, in particular the heat and sudden rainstorms, which sporadically delayed filming.

Interpersonal relationships were strained on the set. Kerman and Deodato frequently clashed, as the two got into long, drawn-out arguments every day of shooting, usually because of remarks Deodato made that Kerman took offense at. Although Deodato noted that the two were always friendly again a few minutes later, Kerman expressed his personal dislike of Deodato in several interviews. He described Deodato as remorseless and uncaring on set and stated that he did not believe that Deodato had a soul. Kerman also noted hostile treatment of other cast and crew members by Deodato, stating: "He was a sadist. He was particularly sadistic to people that couldn't answer back, people that were Colombian, [and] people that were Italian but could be sent home." Yorke and co-star Perry Pirkkanen also did not get along, which Yorke attributed to disappointment that Pirkkanen felt after his friend dropped out of the production. Yorke also alienated Ciardi after he declined to have sex with her in preparation for filming their sex scene.

Multiple cast and crew members were uncomfortable with the film's graphic content, in particular, the genuine killing of animals. Yorke described the shoot as having "a level of cruelty unknown to me" and was initially unsure if he was taking part in a snuff film. When his character was scripted to kill a pig on camera, Yorke refused, leaving the duty to Luca Barbareschi. Yorke had traveled with the pig to the set and felt he had formed a relationship with the animal. When it was shot, the emotional impact of the pig squealing caused Yorke to botch a long monologue, and retakes were not an option because the production lacked access to additional pigs. Kerman similarly objected to the killing of the coati and stormed off the set while its death scene was filmed; he had repeatedly pressed Deodato to let the animal go in the minutes leading up to filming. Pirkkanen cried after filming the butchering of a turtle, and crew members vomited off camera when a squirrel monkey was killed for the film.

The film's sexual content also proved a point of contention among the cast members. Ciardi did not want to bare her breasts during the sex scene between her and Yorke, and she became agitated with him during the filming of the scene. When she refused to comply with the direction, Deodato led her off the set and screamed at her in Italian until she agreed to perform the scene as instructed. Yorke also became severely upset while filming a scene in which his character takes part in the rape of a native girl. The film's content had given Yorke anxiety throughout his time in Colombia, and this tension peaked during the rape scene. His experiences on set ultimately weighed so heavily on him that Yorke ended his relationship with his girlfriend in NYC shortly after his return from the Amazon.

Yorke experienced unfair payment practices when his first payment for the film arrived in Colombian pesos and was less than agreed upon. He refused to continue shooting until he was paid the correct amount in United States dollars. The native extras also went unpaid for their work despite their involvement in numerous dangerous scenes, including one in which they were forced to remain inside a burning hut for an extended period.

== Soundtrack ==
"Cannibal Holocaust (Main Theme)"
Thirty-second audio sample of the theme from Cannibal Holocaust

The film's soundtrack was composed entirely by Italian composer Riz Ortolani, whom Deodato specifically requested because of Ortolani's work in Mondo Cane. Deodato was particularly fond of the film's main theme, "Ti guarderò nel cuore", which was given lyrics and became a worldwide pop hit under the title "More". The music of Cannibal Holocaust is a variety of styles, from a gentle melody in the "Main Theme" to a sad and flowing score in "Crucified Woman", faster and more upbeat tracks in "Cameraman's Recreation", "Relaxing in the Savannah", and "Drinking Coco" to the sinister-sounding "Massacre of the Troupe". The instrumentation is equally mixed, ranging from full orchestras to electronics and synthesizers.

The film's main theme was used in 2022 for the American teen series Euphoria, where it was played during the closing credits for the season-2 episode "The Theater and Its Double".

=== Track listing ===
All tracks are written by Riz Ortolani

Side one
No.	Title	Length
1.	"Cannibal Holocaust (Main Theme)"	2:55
2.	"Adulteress' Punishment"	3:21
3.	"Cameramen's Recreation"	3:11
4.	"Massacre of the Troupe"	3:52
5.	"Love with Fun"	2:53

Side two
No.	Title	Length
1.	"Crucified Women"	2:20
2.	"Relaxing in the Savanna"	3:08
3.	"Savage Rite"	3:40
4.	"Drinking Coco"	3:24
5.	"Cannibal Holocaust (End Titles)"	3:53

== Release ==
Cannibal Holocaust premiered on 7 February 1980 in the Italian city of Milan. Although the courts later confiscated the film based on a citizen's complaint, the initial audience reaction was positive. After seeing the film, director Sergio Leone wrote a letter to Deodato, which stated (translated): "Dear Ruggero, what a movie! The second part is a masterpiece of cinematographic realism, but everything seems so real that I think you will get in trouble with all the world." In the ten days before it was seized, the film had grossed approximately $2 million. In Japan, it grossed $21 million, becoming the second highest-grossing film of that time after E.T. the Extra-Terrestrial. Deodato has claimed the film has grossed as much as $200 million worldwide in the wake of its various re-releases.

=== Critical response ===
Critics remain split on their stances of Cannibal Holocaust. Supporters of the film cite it as a serious and well-made social commentary on the modern world. Sean Axmaker praised the structure and setup of the film, saying: "It's a weird movie with an awkward narrative, which Deodato makes all the more effective with his grimy sheen of documentary realism, while Riz Ortolani's unsettlingly lovely, elegiac score provides a weird undercurrent." Jason Buchanan of AllMovie said: "While it's hard to defend the director for some of the truly repugnant images with which he has chosen to convey his message, there is indeed an underlying point to the film, if one is able to look beyond the sometimes unwatchable images that assault the viewer."

Detractors, however, criticize the over-the-top gore and the genuine animal slayings and also point to the hypocrisy that the film presents. Nick Schager criticized the brutality of the film, saying: "As clearly elucidated by its shocking gruesomeness—as well as its unabashedly racist portrait of indigenous folks it purports to sympathize with [the real indigenous peoples in Brazil whose names were used in the film—the Ya̧nomamö and Shamatari—are not fierce enemies as portrayed in the film, nor is either tribe truly cannibalistic, although the Ya̧nomamö do partake in a form of post-mortem ritual cannibalism]—the actual savages involved with Cannibal Holocaust are the ones behind the camera."

Robert Firsching of AllMovie made similar criticisms of the film's content, saying: "While the film is undoubtedly gruesome enough to satisfy fans, its mixture of nauseating mondo animal slaughter, repulsive sexual violence, and pie-faced attempts at socially conscious moralizing make it rather distasteful morally as well." Slant Magazine's Eric Henderson said it is "artful enough to demand serious critical consideration, yet foul enough to christen you a pervert for even bothering."

In recent years, Cannibal Holocaust has received accolades in various publications as well as a cult following. Review aggregator website Rotten Tomatoes gives the film an approval rating of 67% based on 18 reviews, with a weighted average of 5.5/10. British film magazine Total Film ranked Cannibal Holocaust as the tenth greatest horror film of all time, and the film was included in a similar list of the top 25 horror films compiled by Wired. The film also came in eighth on IGN's list of the ten greatest "grindhouse" films.

=== Interpretations ===
Cannibal Holocaust is seen by some critics as social commentary on various aspects of modern civilization by comparing Western society to that of the cannibals. David Carter says: "Cannibal Holocaust is not merely focused on the societal taboo of flesh eating. The greater theme of the film is the difference between the civilized and the uncivilized. Though the graphic violence can be hard for most to stomach, the most disturbing aspect of the film is what Deodato is saying about modern society. The film asks the questions 'What is it to be 'civilized'?' and 'Is it a good thing?'" Mark Goodall, author of Sweet & Savage: The World Through the Shockumentary Film Lens, also contends the film's message is [to show] "the rape of the natural world by the unnatural; the exploitation of 'primitive' cultures for Western entertainment."

Deodato's intentions regarding the Italian media coverage of the Red Brigades have also fallen under critical examination and has been expanded to include all sensationalism. Carter explores this, claiming that "[the lack of journalistic integrity] is shown through the interaction between Professor Monroe and the news agency that had backed the documentary crew. They continually push Monroe to finish editing the footage because blood and guts equal ratings." Lloyd Kaufman claims that this form of exploitative journalism can still be seen in the media today and in programming such as reality television. Goodall and film historians David Slater and David Kerekes have also suggested that Deodato was attempting to comment on the documentary works of Antonio Climati with his film.

Despite these interpretations, Deodato has said in interviews that he had no intentions in Cannibal Holocaust but to make a film about cannibals. Actor Luca Barbareschi asserts this as well and believes that Deodato only uses his films to "put on a show". Robert Kerman contradicts these assertions, stating that Deodato did tell him of political concerns involving the media in the making of this film.

These interpretations have also been criticized as hypocritical and poor justification for the film's content, as Cannibal Holocaust itself is highly sensationalized. Firsching claims that "The fact that the film's sole spokesperson for the anti-exploitation perspective is played by porn star Robert Kerman should give an indication of where its sympathies lie", while Schager says Deodato is "pathetically justifying the unrepentant carnage by posthumously damning his eaten filmmaker protagonists with a 'who are the real monsters—the cannibals or us?' anti-imperialism morale."

Cannibal Holocaust is relevant to the historical relationship between the United States and Latin America. In Dissecting Cannibal Holocaust, Nathan Wardinski observes that "the fictionalized native people of this film personify Western and specifically US attitudes toward the region and its people." The film is also relevant to the contentious history of western anthropologists and the Yanomami people (referred to as Yanomamö in the film). The Yanomami were brought to worldwide attention by anthropologist Napoleon Chagnon whose work described the Yanomami as "the fierce people" who lived in a constant state of warfare. According to Chagnon, rape and domestic violence were commonplace in Yanomami culture when he conducted field research. These findings were disputed by other anthropologists and Chagnon's reputation was devastated by the book Darkness in El Dorado: How Scientists and Journalists Devastated the Amazon by Patrick Tierney, a layperson who was found to have fabricated evidence, bringing the accuracy of Darkness in El Dorado into question. The book was the basis for the documentary Secrets of the Tribe. There is evidence that Clerici used Chagnon's work as the basis for the script to Cannibal Holocaust.

== Controversies ==
Since its original release, Cannibal Holocaust has been the target of censorship by moral and animal advocates. Other than graphic gore, the film contains several scenes of sexual violence and genuine cruelty to animals, issues which find Cannibal Holocaust in the midst of controversy to this day. Because of this notoriety, Cannibal Holocaust has been marketed as having been banned in over 50 countries. In 2006, Entertainment Weekly magazine named Cannibal Holocaust as the 20th most controversial film of all time.

=== Snuff film allegations ===
Urban legends claim the film's impalement scene was one of several examined by courts to determine whether the depicted violence was staged or genuine.

Ten days after its premiere in Milan, Cannibal Holocaust was confiscated under the orders of a local magistrate, and Ruggero Deodato was charged with obscenity. As all copies were to be turned over to the authorities, the film was released in other countries like the United Kingdom via subterfuge. In January 1981, during the film's theatrical run in France, the magazine Photo suggested that certain deaths depicted in the film were real, which would have made Cannibal Holocaust a snuff film. Despite rumors of the contrary, neither Deodato nor the film's producers were ever formally charged with murder. Deodato said in interviews that magistrates had actually suspected him of murder and that he avoided being charged by asking cast members to appear in court, with at least Barbareschi appearing.

Rumors of the Cannibal Holocaust murder trial often claim that the actors had signed contracts with the production which ensured that they would not appear in any type of media, motion pictures, or commercials for one year following the film's release. Deodato himself has claimed this was the case. However, actor Carl Yorke has denied that he ever signed any sort of contract of this kind nor was he asked to appear in court. Furthermore, actors Robert Kerman, Perry Pirkkanen, and Francesca Ciardi worked in films released during and shortly after Cannibal Holocaust's release.

=== Censorship ===
Although the snuff film allegations were successfully refuted, the Italian courts decided to ban Cannibal Holocaust because of the genuine animal slayings, citing animal cruelty laws. Deodato, Franco Palaggi, Franco Di Nunzio, Gianfranco Clerici, producer Alda Pia and United Artists Europa representative Sandro Perotti each received a four-month suspended sentence after they were all convicted of obscenity and violence. Deodato fought in the courts for three additional years to get his film unbanned. In 1984, the courts ruled in favor of Deodato, and Cannibal Holocaust was granted a rating certificate of VM18 for a cut print. It would later be re-released uncut.

Cannibal Holocaust also faced censorship issues in other countries around the world. In 1981, video releases were not required to pass before the British Board of Film Censors (BBFC), which had de facto power to ban films in the United Kingdom. Cannibal Holocaust was released straight-to-video there, thus avoiding the possible banning of the film. This did not save the film, however, because in 1983, the Director of Public Prosecutions compiled a list of 72 video releases that were not brought before the BBFC for certification and declared them prosecutable for obscenity. This list of "video nasties" included Cannibal Holocaust, which was successfully prosecuted and effectively banned by its inclusion on the list. The film was not approved for release in the UK until 2001, albeit with nearly six minutes of mandated cuts. In 2011, the BBFC waived all but one of these previous edits and passed Cannibal Holocaust with fifteen seconds of cuts. It was determined that the only scene that breached the BBFC's guidelines was the killing of a coatimundi, and the BBFC acknowledged that previous cuts were reactionary to the film's reputation.

Cannibal Holocaust was banned at various times in Australia, Norway, Finland, Iceland, New Zealand, Singapore, South Africa, and several other countries. The film was briefly released in the US by Trans American Films in 1985, but this release was commercially doomed because Cannibal Holocaust was rated X by the Motion Picture Association of America (MPAA). Cannibal Holocaust was released on LaserDisc and distributed worldwide by Cult Epics. It would eventually get a two-disc DVD release in 2005 by Grindhouse Releasing. In 2005, the Office of Film and Literature Classification in Australia lifted the ban, passing Cannibal Holocaust with an R18+ rating for the uncut print, including the consumer advice, "High level sexual violence, high level violence, animal cruelty". In 2006, the film was rejected for classification and banned in its entirety by the OFLC in New Zealand. Cuts to retain an R18 classification were offered by the Office, but they were eventually refused. This ban would eventually be lifted in 2026, passing with an R18+ rating, including the consumer advice, "Rape, graphic violence, graphic animal cruelty and content that may disturb".

=== Animal cruelty ===
Many of the censorship issues with Cannibal Holocaust concern the on-screen killings of animals. Deodato himself has condemned his past actions, saying: "I was stupid to introduce animals." Although six animal deaths appear onscreen, seven animals were killed for the production, as the scene depicting the monkey's death was shot twice, resulting in the death of two monkeys. Both of the animals were eaten by indigenous cast members, who consider monkey brains a delicacy. The animals that were killed onscreen were:

- A South American coati (mistaken for a muskrat in the film), killed with a knife
- An Arrau turtle, decapitated and its limbs, shell, and entrails removed
- A tarantula, killed with a machete
- A boa constrictor, also killed with a machete
- A squirrel monkey, decapitated with a machete
- A pig, shot in the head with a shotgun at point-blank range

Film historian Andrew DeVos has argued that the animal deaths have been harshly condemned because of the film's classification as exploitation, whereas animal mutilations in films perceived by critics to be classics or art films are often ignored. DeVos cites several examples of this double standard, including The Rules of the Game, El Topo, Wake in Fright, and Apocalypse Now. The BBFC made a similar conclusion regarding the censorship of scenes in which the deaths were quick and painless, noting: "Removing these sequences would be inconsistent with the BBFC's decisions to permit quick clean kills in several other films, such as Apocalypse Now."

== Legacy ==
Cannibal Holocaust was innovative in its plot structure, specifically with the concept of the "found footage" being brought back to civilization and later viewed to determine the fate of the crew that shot it. This was later popularized as a distinct style in Hollywood cinema by The Last Broadcast and The Blair Witch Project, both of which use similar storytelling devices. Each film uses the idea of a lost film team making a documentary in the wilderness, and their footage returned. Advertisements for The Blair Witch Project also promoted the idea that the footage is genuine. Deodato has acknowledged the similarities between his film and The Blair Witch Project, and though he holds no malice against the producers, he is frustrated at the publicity that The Blair Witch Project received for being an original production. The producers of The Last Broadcast have denied that Cannibal Holocaust was a major influence. Nonetheless, the film was cited by director Paco Plaza as a source of inspiration for the found footage films REC and REC 2.

Cannibal Holocaust has been regarded as the apex of the cannibal genre, and it bears similarities to subsequent cannibal films made during the same time period. Cannibal Ferox also stars Kerman and Pirkkanen, and star Giovanni Lombardo Radice says it was made based on the success of Cannibal Holocaust. Cannibal Ferox has also been noted as containing similar themes to Cannibal Holocaust, such as comparison of Western violence to perceived uncivilized cultures and anti-imperialism. In a mixed review, film journalist Jay Slater claims: "Certainly a tough customer, Cannibal Ferox still fails where Deodato succeeds. [...] Lenzi attempts to tackle cultural defilement and racial issues, but Cannibal Ferox is nothing more than a shoddy exercise in sadism and animal cruelty." Reviewer Andrew Parkinson also notes: "At the end, there is a basic attempt to validate Cannibal Ferox, posing that old chestnut of whether civilised man is actually more savage than the uncivilised tribespeople."

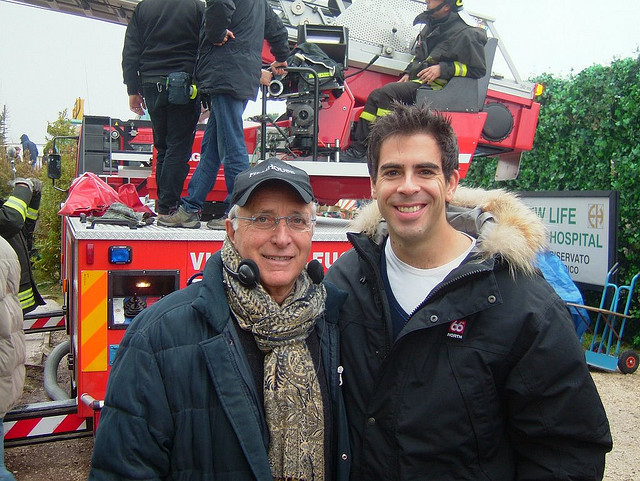
Ruggero Deodato with Eli Roth on the set of Hostel: Part II (2007)

Unofficial sequels to Cannibal Holocaust were produced in the years following its release. The titles of these films were changed following their original theatrical releases in order to associate the film with Cannibal Holocaust in different markets. In 1985, Mario Gariazzo directed Schiave bianche: violenza in Amazzonia, which was also released as Cannibal Holocaust 2: The Catherine Miles Story. In addition to the new title, Slater notes similarities between the score in The Catherine Miles Story and Riz Ortolani's score in Cannibal Holocaust. Previously known for his work in Mondo films, Antonio Climati directed Natura contro in 1988, which was released as Cannibal Holocaust II in the United Kingdom.

In 2005, Deodato announced that he planned to make a companion piece to Cannibal Holocaust entitled Cannibals. Deodato was originally hesitant about directing his new film, as he thought that he would make it too violent for American audiences. However, while he was in Prague filming his cameo appearance in Hostel: Part II for Eli Roth, Deodato viewed Hostel and decided that he would direct after all, citing it as a similarly violent film that was given a mainstream release in the United States. Although the screenplay, written by Christine Conradt, was completed, a financial conflict between Deodato and the film's producer led to the project's cancellation. In 2013, Roth directed The Green Inferno, which takes its title from the fictional documentary produced in Cannibal Holocaust. Roth's film was intended as an homage to Cannibal Holocaust and other cannibal films from the same era.

The film's influence has extended to other media as well. In 2001, death metal band Necrophagia released a song entitled "Cannibal Holocaust" from the eponymous record.

It was revealed in April 2020, that the movie would be getting a video game sequel called Ruggero Deodato, Cannibal. The game is being developed by Fantastico Studios and was expected to be available from November 2020 for Nintendo Switch, PlayStation 4, Xbox One, PC and mobile. However, in December 2020, the game was retitled Borneo: A Jungle Nightmare and delayed to Spring 2021, and later in 2024 under a new title, "Cannibal Tales". The new title would still feature the "Borneo: Jungle Nightmare" story, but now under an episodic style of gameplay.

== Alternate versions (home media) ==
Because of its graphic content, there are several different versions in circulation, edited to varying degrees. In the United Kingdom, it was originally released on VHS by Go Video in 1982 with approximately six minutes of cuts. These cuts were self-imposed by the distributor, possibly caused by technical limitations of the tape. In 2001, the film was passed for release on DVD by the British Board of Film Classification with five minutes and 44 seconds of cuts to remove scenes of animal cruelty and sexual violence; all but 15 seconds of these cuts were waived for a re-release in 2011. The latter also includes a new edit sponsored by Deodato, which reduces the violence toward animals. Grindhouse Releasing's home video releases contain an "Animal Cruelty Free" version that omits the six animal deaths. Other versions also contain alternative footage shot specifically for Middle Eastern markets that do not depict nudity.

There are multiple versions of the Last Road to Hell segment, which causes variances even among uncensored releases. An extended version includes approximately 10 seconds of footage not seen in an alternative, shorter version. This additional footage includes a wide-angle shot of firing-squad executions, a close-up of a dead victim and extended footage of bodies being carried into the back of a truck. The longer version also includes different titles that correctly name the film crew as they appear in the final film, while the shorter version gives the names that originally appear in the script.

The first Ultra HD Blu-ray release was handled by UK based distributor 88 Films in November 2022. In October 2025, a 4K restoration of the film by Grindhouse Releasing premiered at the Beyond Fest festival. This "Special Edition", which features the 'Green Inferno' footage in its original 1.37:1 aspect ratio for the first time, is scheduled to be released in a six-disc combo pack alongside the uncensored theatrical version and a never-before-released "PG-rated" version in October 2026.

== See also ==
- List of cult films
- Salò, or the 120 Days of Sodom
