= Carl Gabriel Yorke =

American actor (born 1952)

- Born: November 23, 1952 (age 73); Burbank, California, U.S.
- Occupations: Actor, story analyst, development executive, technical writer.
- Years active: 1970–1999

Carl Gabriel Yorke (born November 23, 1952) is an American actor. He is best known for playing Alan Yates in Ruggero Deodato’s Cannibal Holocaust.

== Early life ==
Carl Gabriel Yorke was born in Burbank, California on November 23, 1952. His show business roots go back four generations: his Great-grandfather Gus Yorke spent over 40 years in vaudeville and on the stage with Yorke and Adams, Two Plain Jews and Potash and Perlmutter in London. Grandfather Gabe Yorke was head of publicity at 20th Century Fox and Paramount. Father Harvey Yorke was the U.S. Air Force liaison for Hollywood feature film productions.

The third and final child in a military family, Yorke became hooked on acting when he visited the set of the 1962 WWII epic, The Longest Day which was shooting on the outskirts of Paris where the family was stationed. He sustained that passion by starring in numerous plays all the way through high school in Novato, California, just across the Golden Gate Bridge from San Francisco.

Before he graduated high school, Yorke was performing as an improvisational actor in San Francisco with The Committee Workshop on Broadway in North Beach. He stayed with the company until 1974 when, while still in college, he joined the cast of One Flew Over the Cuckoo's Nest at the Little Fox Theater down the street at Pacific and Montgomery.

== New York ==
After graduating from San Francisco State University, Yorke did three national tours with Cuckoo's Nest. Joe Pantoliano, who played Billy Bibbit on the tour, talked him into moving to New York and took him in as a roommate until Yorke could get established.

In the following year, Yorke waited tables. First, at the east side disco, Adams Apple. Then as the first waiter, and on the weekend night shift, at the infamous Empire Diner in Chelsea. Finally, at the Colonnades, a popular bar across the street from the Public Theater.

However, his girlfriend, an up-an-coming literary agent, objected to his late hours and got him a job as a freelance reader at Dell Publishing where he read an average of ten books a week for $15 per book. This eventually gave way to reading for various New York movie studio story departments; for Diane Sokolow at Warner Bros. Pictures, Buffy Shutt at Paramount Pictures, Joel DiTrolio at Orion Pictures, MGM, United Artists, and many small production and publishing companies including Felice Picano's Sea Horse Press.

The reading jobs supported his acting habit which took the form of classes with the highly influential acting teacher Uta Hagen and the lesser-known Warren Robertson and Gene Lasko. At the same time, he took minor roles on almost all of the New York-based soap operas.

One day in Uta Hagen's class, someone asked if he had a driver's license, and sent him to the offices of American Ballet Theater to interview as the personal driver for ballet great Mikhail Baryshnikov, a job he kept for two years.

== Cannibal Holocaust ==
In August 1979, Yorke's 'audition' for the role of Alan Yates in Cannibal Holocaust consisted of two questions, "Are you willing to go to South America for a month?" and "What size shoe do you wear?" He replaced an actor who quit after the production bought his costumes. Yorke wore the same size shoes and got the job.

Three days later, Yorke flew to Bogota, Colombia, then to the tiny town of Leticia on the Amazon River, without knowing the name of the movie, what it was about, or any of the cast or crew. According to his interview on the "Grindhouse 25th Anniversary DVD" on YouTube he never had his own copy of the script even though he was the main character.

== Controversy ==
He was one of four actors who the Italian police believed had been murdered in the making of the 1980 horror film, Cannibal Holocaust. On September 21, 2020, he appeared on the Uneasy Terrain Explorers podcast discussing his experience and the following legacy of Cannibal Holocaust.

== Filmography ==
=== Movies ===
- Cannibal Holocaust (1980) - Alan Yates
- Jack the Bear (1993) - Gordon Layton
- Ghost in the Machine (1993) - Safety Technician
- Apollo 13 (1995) - SIM Tech #2
- Idle Hands (1999) - Chaperone

=== Television ===
- All My Children (1980-1982)
- The Paper Chase (1982–1983) - Berger
- Dynasty (1984) - Reporter
- Civil Wars (1992) - Alexander Eiger
- NYPD Blue (1993) - Detective Sherman
- Viper (1994) - Reporter
- Sirens (1994) - Attorney
- My So-Called Life (1994) - Investor
- Letter to My Killer (1995, TV Movie) - Hunter #2
- Sliders (1998-1999) - Technician / Director / Kromagg Leader (final appearance)

=== Stage ===
- The Committee Workshop (1969-1972) (San Francisco improvisation company)
- Improvisation, Inc. (1972-1974) (San Francisco improvisation company)
- One Flew Over the Cuckoo's Nest by Dale Wasserman (as Ruckly) (Resident company in San Francisco 1974–1975) (3 national tours 1975–1976)
- Visions of Kerouac by Martin Duberman (as Gary Snyder) (1977) (Lion Theater, NYC)
- Badgers by Donald Wollner (as Doug) (1981) (Manhattan Punchline)

== See also ==
- Perry Pirkkanen
- Francesca Ciardi
- Luca Barbareschi
- Robert Kerman
