= Francesca Ciardi =

Italian film actress (born 1954)

- Born: 26 July 1954 (age 71); Rome, Italy
- Occupation: Actress
- Years active: 1980–1991; 2014–present

Francesca Ciardi (born 26 July 1954) is an Italian film actress.

She was one of four actors who the Italian police believed had been murdered in the making of the 1980 horror film Cannibal Holocaust. The film was considered so realistic that, shortly after the film was released, rumors arouse that its director Ruggero Deodato was arrested for murder. Rumors also speculated that the actors had signed contracts to stay out of the media for a year in order to fuel rumors that the film was a snuff movie; however this was later determined to be false based on accounts by the actors and the fact that some personnel on the cast were performing simultaneously in other films. The actors appeared on a television show as proof.

In 2014, after over twenty years out of the film business, Ciardi returned to film in Spencer Hawken's zero budget movie Death Walks.

== Filmography ==
- Cannibal Holocaust (1980) – Faye Daniels
- The Tunnel (1980)
- Caccia al ladro d'autore (1985) (TV series)
- La ragazza dei lilla (1985)
- Mosca addio (1987)
- Safari (1991)
- Death Walks (2016)

== See also ==
- Carl Gabriel Yorke
- Perry Pirkkanen
- Luca Barbareschi
