= Concorde Affaire '79 =

1979 film directed by Ruggero Deodato

Concorde Affair
- Theatrical poster
- Directed by: Ruggero Deodato (as Roger Deodato)
- Screenplay by: Ernesto Gastaldi; Renzo Genta
- Story by: Alberto Fioretti
- Produced by: Mino Loy; Luciano Martino
- Starring: James Franciscus; Mimsy Farmer; Van Johnson; Joseph Cotten; Edmund Purdom
- Cinematography: Federico Zanni
- Edited by: Eugenio Alabiso
- Music by: Stelvio Cipriani
- Production companies: Dania Film; National Cinematografica
- Distributed by: Medusa Distribuzione
- Release date: 23 March 1979
- Running time: 96 minutes
- Country: Italy

Concorde Affaire '79 (English: "Concorde Affair '79", also known as The Concorde Affair) is a 1979 Italian adventure thriller film directed by Ruggero Deodato from a screenplay by Ernesto Gastaldi and Renzo Genta. It stars James Franciscus, Mimsy Farmer, Edmund Purdom, Venantino Venantini, Van Johnson and Joseph Cotten.

Released in the same year as The Concorde ... Airport '79 and featuring actor Joseph Cotten, who appeared in Airport '77, the film was an attempt by producers to take advantage of the success of the Airport film franchise of the 1970s. It was released by Medusa Film on March 23, 1979.

== Plot ==
L.P.A. Flight 820, a Concorde test flight, is sabotaged, which forces the plane to crash land in the ocean off the coast of Martinique. The only survivor is a Jeanne Beneyton, a flight attendant. Two fishermen find her but then are soon killed off by a group of suited corporate agents who ride out in a speedboat because they were witnesses to the crash.

In New York City, an American investigative reporter, Moses Brody, receives a phone call from his ex-wife Nicole, who runs a local restaurant in Martinique, who tells him about an "important story". But upon arrival in Martinique, Brody learns that Nicole has died from an apparent "heart attack". Brody is devastated. Later that evening, while wandering the streets of the town, Brody is attacked by a gang of thugs but is rescued by a mysterious local man named Georges, who owns a fishing trawler and tells him that Nicole was a friend of his and she was killed because she knew that the crashed Concorde flight landed on a reef nearby and the two of them decide to investigate.

Meanwhile, a shady businessman named Milland and his business partner Danker learn about the Concorde crash and, after consulting with their associate, Martinez, plot to cover up any evidence involved with the crash. It becomes apparent that Milland and Danker are behind the events.

Brody and Georges are in a boat when they see Jeanne Beneyton jump off of the henchmen's boat and attempt to swim away before she is recaptured. Later, they arrive at the crash site, and after donning scuba gear, they find the wreck of the Concorde submerged under 100 feet of water in the Caribbean. While Brody goes inside the wreck, Georges gets his arm stuck in a jagged part of the machinery, and Brody has to amputate Georges's left arm to free him. Moses discovers explosive charges on the downed plane, which were planted earlier by Milland's henchmen to destroy any evidence of foul play.

Upon surfacing, Georges gets hit in the goggles by a bullet as several henchmen in a speedboat appear and attack. Brody is forced to go back down under the water with two scuba men in chase. Brody outwits them by hiding in an underwater cave, in which he goes back to the surface, pulls out the henchman who remained behind in the speed board, and stole it.

Brody then goes to the United States Consul of Martinique and wants to start an investigation. He then takes them to the site and finds nothing. They call off the search for the missing Concorde. Brody then says that he saw Jeanne on a yacht. The Consul then says that if he knew it was Brody, he would have gotten him off the case as Brody was reporting a scandal concerning a Congressman.

Meanwhile, Milland and his men watch a video as the submerged Concorde explodes. They then find out that Jeanne is alive and being held for a $1 million ransom. At the same time, another L.P.A. Concorde plane lands in Rio de Janeiro, Brazil which prepares itself for a flight from Venezuela to London.

That evening, Brody sneaks on board the henchmen's boat, where he overhears them, saying that they want to get rid of Jean, and overhears them talking about their superiors taking down a 2nd Concorde flight. Brody rescues her, and they escape from the boat. After reaching the shore, Brody tries talking to Jeanne about the crash, but she is so shaken by the traumatic experience that she can't remember very much. In the morning, they hitch a ride on a banana truck driven by a local farmer. But soon Milland's henchmen, led by Forsythe find Brody and Jeanne again and give chase, but they are cut off by a construction vehicle.

On board the airborne second Concorde, L.P.A. Flight 128, a crew member turns on one of the inboard engines on the plane. Up in the cockpit, the pilot Captain Scott discovers something which same thing happened as with the first attack: loss of power. This is because a henchman puts vials of acid in the flight's food, which breaks upon being heated up, and acid breaks through the microwave ovens and severs the electrical lines in the cabin.

In Martinique, Brody calls the Consul and has Jeanne begin to tell her story about it, but they are cut off as the henchmen are back. The chase continues as the Consul calls up his associates in London with his ideas about what might be happening. The Concorde then loses radio contact with London control, and the cabin lights begin to flicker. Captain Scott soon regains contact with London, who suggests they run a circuit control. The London air traffic controller also gets a call from Jean. The controller then reports they can't reach the Concorde. On board the plane, the navigator then reports that pressure in the main cabin is dropping.

On the ground, Jeanne contacts the American Consul at a bank, but Forsythe and his henchmen arrive again, and she and Brody must run. This time, the police are there and enter a shootout with the men in which all of the henchmen are killed.

Meanwhile, London Air Traffic Control gets radio contact with the Concorde on a VHF frequency. Captain Scott on the Concorde then descends the aircraft to a lower altitude below 12,000 feet, but London now can't get Concorde on the VHF frequency, either. Brody and Jeanne reach the American Consul, and she begins describing what happened.

The Concorde banks, and the number one engine overheats. London control reports that the crash began with the overheating of the oven. The crew discovers the number one engine is now on fire, and they quickly extinguish it. The Concorde continues its descent as one passenger becomes hysterical.

The plane then levels out at 9,000 feet. London control can now see them on radar and proceed to clear a runway. Concorde then makes a beautiful landing. Brody is relieved.

The next day, Milland contacts Brody by phone and wants to offer him a shady contract after reading the headline "Concorde Passengers Saved by Journalist." Jeanne thinks that he'll get a big welcome in New York. Brody jokingly states that he doesn't have to go, and they laugh. He says he has to pay a visit "to a certain bigshot." Jeanne then gets on an Air France flight to return to Paris, but before she leaves, he says he'll give her a call.

Brody then calls his friend Alfie and says that he wants to "push a certain Humpty Dumpty off his wall". He says he wants to know the heads of the top corporations in New York City, heavily involved in aircraft sales to South American countries, specifically those most hurt by competition from Concorde. The credits begin over footage of a Concorde in flight.

== Cast ==
- James Franciscus as Moses Brody
- Mimsy Farmer as Jeanne Beneyton
- Van Johnson as Captain Scott
- Joseph Cotten as Milland
- Venantino Venantini as Forsythe
- Fiamma Maglione as Nicole Brody
- Edmund Purdom as Danker
- Francisco Charles as Georges
- Ottaviano Dell'Acqua as John
- Renzo Marignano as Martinez
- John Stacy as American Consul
- Francesco Carnelutti as Co-pilot on the second plane
- Aldo Barberito as Priest
- Roberto Santi as Flight navigator
- Monica Scattini as woman in Brody's office

Uncredited

- Robert Kerman as Kelman, chief London air traffic controller
- Michael Gaunt as London air traffic controller
- Dakar as Martinican fisherman
- Goffredo Unger as Forsythe's henchman

== Home media ==
The film has been released on Blu-Ray in Germany by Ascot Elite.

== Critical reception ==
A review for the website Mondo Digital called the film "a very entertaining little actioner with a unique cast, particularly a charismatic turn by Franciscus."
