= Luca Barbareschi =

Italian-Uruguayan actor, filmmaker, and politician

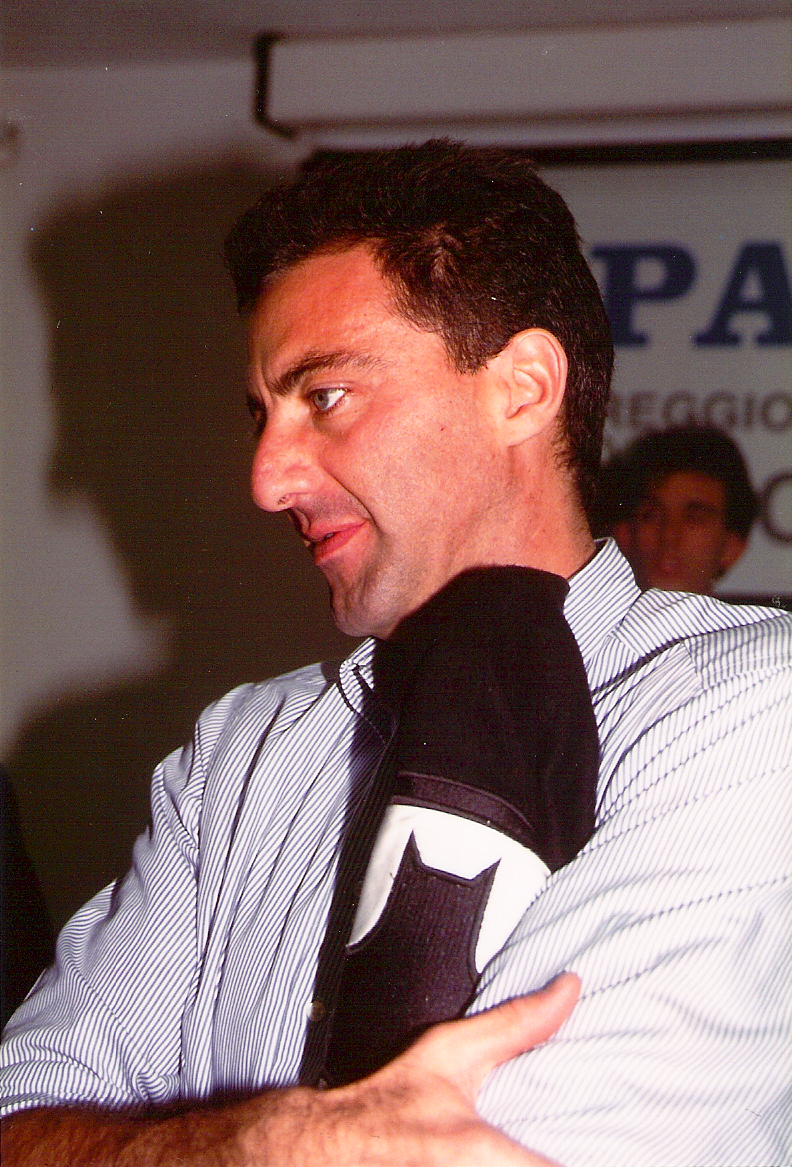
- Barbareschi in 2008

Member of the Chamber of Deputies
- In office 29 April 2008 – 4 March 2014
- Constituency: Sardinia

Personal details
- Born: 28 July 1956 (age 70) Montevideo, Uruguay
- Party: AN (2008–2010); PdL (2008–2010); FLI (2010–2011)
- Occupation: Politician; television presenter; actor

Luca Giorgio Barbareschi (born 28 July 28 1956) is an Italian actor, filmmaker, businessman, and politician. He is known for playing Mark Tomaso in the 1980 Italian horror film Cannibal Holocaust. He also represented Sardinia in the Italian Chamber of Deputies between 2008 and 2014.

== Early life and education ==
Barbareschi was born on 28 July 1956 in Montevideo, Uruguay, to Francesco Saverio, an engineer and former World War II partisan from Milan, and Maria Antonietta Hirsch, an economist of Ashkenazi Jewish descent. His parents divorced when he was six and he moved to Milan, where he attended the Leo XIII Institute during the 1960s. In 2008, he alleged that a Jesuit priest at the Institute had sexually abused him between the ages of eight and thirteen.

== Career ==
=== Theater and film ===
Barbareschi studied acting with Alessandro Fersen and began his professional career in 1970 as an assistant director to Virginio Puecher at the Teatro di Verona. He spent a year as an assistant director at the Lyric Opera of Chicago before moving to the Metropolitan Opera in New York City under Frank Corsaro. He later enrolled in the Actors Studio, where he studied for four years. While at the Actors Studio, Barbareschi was cast as cameraman Mark Tomaso in the film Cannibal Holocaust, directed by Ruggero Deodato. The film was controversial for its graphic violence and realistic murder scenes which were initially speculated to be genuine, although contrary to rumours Deodato and the film's producers were never charged with murder. Deodato himself has claimed that the actors who portrayed the murdered characters – including Barbareschi – were contracted to stay out of the public eye for a year after the film's release. The existence of these contracts was disputed by Carl Gabriel Yorke but confirmed by Francesca Ciardi, both of whom co-starred on the film with Barbareschi.

=== Politics ===
In 2008, Barbareschi was elected to the Italian Chamber of Deputies as a member of Silvio Berlusconi's centre-right party The People of Freedom. In 2010, he joined Gianfranco Fini's new party Future and Freedom with 32 other deputies and 10 senators. He left parliament in 2013.

== Activism ==
As a child sexual abuse survivor, Barbareschi has advocated for the protection of victims of pedophilia. He established the Luca Barbareschi Foundation for this purpose, and he worked to pass an anti-pedophilia law while serving in parliament.

== Controversies ==
On 11 June 2012, during an interview for the program Le Iene, Barbareschi attacked journalist Filippo Roma and his cameraman, and stole Roma's cellphone. He attacked Roma again two months later in Filicudi. In 2022, Barbareschi was accused of homophobia after remarking that "the homosexual mafia is the problem" during a speech on April 30 in Sutri. He later claimed the comments were taken out of context and were intended as a joke, and that he himself had had homosexual experiences. Barbareschi has defended director Roman Polanski, with whom he has worked several times as a producer, against his sexual abuse conviction, claiming the case against him is due to "political correctness".

== Personal life ==
=== Marriages and relationships ===
Barbareschi has been married twice. His first wife was Patrizia Fachini, with whom he has three daughters: Beatrice, Eleonora and Angelica. His second wife is Elena Monorchio, the daughter of former State Accountant General Andrea Monorchio; they married on June 20, 2015 and have two children: Maddalena (b. 2010) and Francesco Saverio (b. 2012). Barbareschi was previously in a seven-year-long relationship with actress Lucrezia Lante della Rovere.

=== Religion ===
Barbareschi practices Judaism.

== Filmography ==
=== Cinema ===
- 1977 – Ultimo mondo cannibale
- 1979 – From Corleone to Brooklyn
- 1980 – Cannibal Holocaust as Mark
- 1983 – Dream of a Summer Night
- 1984 – Bank Clerks
- 1986 – Monte Napoleone
- 1987 – Private Affairs
- 1988 – Bye Bye Baby
- 1990 – In the Name of the Sovereign People
- 1991 – L'amico arabo
- 1992 – The Blonde
- 1992 – Obiettivo indiscreto
- 1994 – La delegazione
- 1995 – La tenda nera
- 1995 – La famiglia Ricordi
- 1995 – Bits and Pieces
- 1996 – Ardena
- 1999 – The Frenchman's Son
- 2002 – Il Trasformista
- 2008 – The International
- 2010 – We Believed
- 2013 – Something Good (director, actor)
- 2019 – Dolceroma (producer)
- 2019 – An Officer and a Spy (producer)
- 2021 – Appunti di un venditore di donne (producer)
- 2022 – Ero in guerra ma non lo sapevo (producer)
- 2023 – The Palace (producer)

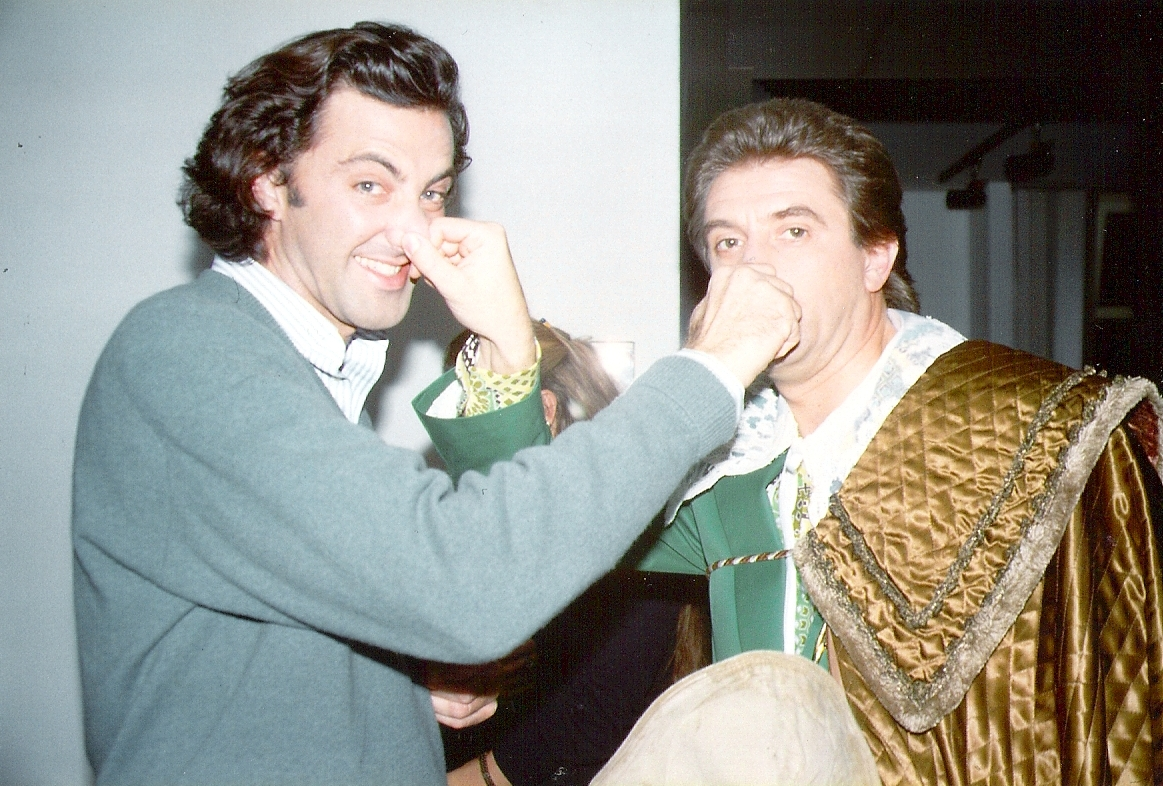
Luca Barbareschi with Ezio Greggio

=== Television ===
- 1992 – Questo è amore
- 1992 – That's Amore
- 1997 – Trenta righe per un delitto
- 1998 – Cronaca nera
- 1999 – Jesus
- 2000 – Greed
- 2002 – Giorni da leone
- 2003 – Una vita in regalo
- 2004 – Rivoglio i miei figli
- 2005 – Nebbie e delitti
- 2005 – Les Rois maudits
- 2006 – Giorni da leone 2
- 2006 – La profezia dei templari
- 2007 – Nebbie e delitti 2
- 2009 – Nebbie e delitti 3
- 2012 – Nero Wolfe (producer)
- 2013 – Le Iene con Botte da Orbi
- 2015 – Pietro Mennea - La freccia del sud (fiction)
- 2022 – Il grande gioco (producer)

=== Theatre ===
- 2004 – Amadeus
- 2006 – Il Sogno del Principe di Salina, l'Ultimo Gattopardo
