= Robert Kerman =

American actor (1947–2018)

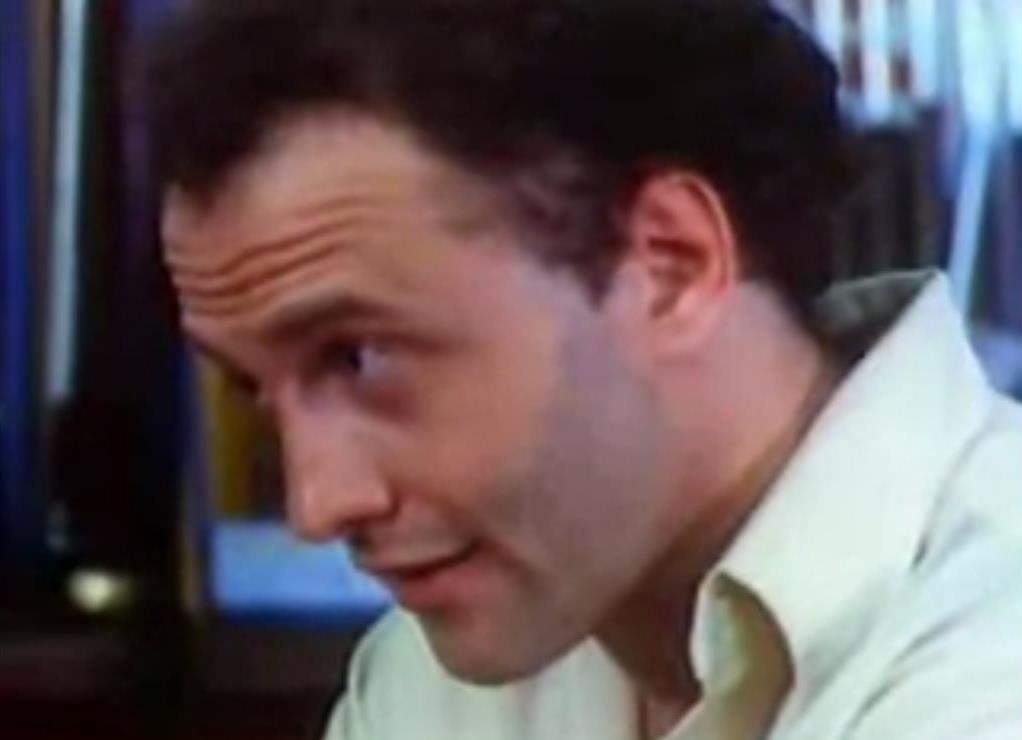
- Kerman in Debbie Does Dallas (1978)
- Born: Robert Charles Kerman; December 16, 1947; New York City, New York, U.S.
- Died: December 27, 2018 (aged 71); New York City, New York, U.S.
- Other name: See below
- Education: American Academy of Dramatic Arts
- Height: 5 ft 8 in (1.73 m)

Robert Charles Kerman (December 16, 1947 – December 27, 2018), also known as R. Bolla, was an American actor who had a pornographic acting career during what is considered to be the "golden age" period of the porn film industry during the mid-1970s to the early/mid-1980s. As Bolla, he appeared in well over 100 pornographic films, most famously Debbie Does Dallas (1978). He was one of few adult performers to have an appreciable mainstream acting career, with a leading role as Professor Harold Monroe in the controversial horror film Cannibal Holocaust (1980).

== Early life and education ==
Born to a Jewish family in the Brooklyn borough of New York City, New York, he grew up in a middle-class Italian neighborhood of Bensonhurst. Kerman graduated from Brooklyn College in 1970. While in college, he began his acting career and appeared in Off-Broadway plays. Later he also studied acting at the American Academy of Dramatic Arts.

== Adult film career ==
Kerman's onscreen sex appearances began with director Roberta Findlay's Anyone But My Husband. He adopted the stage name 'Richard Bolla' after a box of Bolla wine he was overlooking while being asked for a stage name. His name was abbreviated to 'R. Bolla' after being called "Dick" by his peers, which annoyed him. He became one of the most prolific male stars of the Golden Age of Porn. He performed in 230 films, and was inducted into the AVN Hall of Fame in 1998.

Kerman bitterly regretted his participation in the adult film industry, especially being in the film Debbie Does Dallas, which he felt ruined any prospect of him attaining mainstream acting success. He stated: "In retrospect I'm really sorry that I did it, because I probably ruined the best years of my life as an actor."

=== Aliases ===
During his adult film career, Kerman was variously credited as Richard Bolla, R. Bolla, R. Bollo, Trevor Manmak, Bobbie Ball, Tom Triplett, Martin Spellman, Neil Ronds, Bob Kerman, R. Bola, Robert Kerns, Robert Brown, Richard Bollo, Richard Bola, Robert Kerr, Robin Hoock, Richard Balla, Richard Lair, Robert Bolla, Richard Bolla, Richard Bocca, Richard Bollar, and Sam Speed.

== Mainstream film career ==
Although his professional career began in adult films, Kerman was a trained actor who played minor parts in such mainstream productions such as The Goodbye Girl (1977) and The Concorde... Airport '79 (1979). In the 1980s, he starred in several Italian horror films, including Ruggero Deodato's Cannibal Holocaust, and Umberto Lenzi's Eaten Alive! and Cannibal Ferox. Still, he remained active in pornography throughout the first half of the decade.

In 1985, attempting to work solely in mainstream productions, he obtained a Hollywood agent and went on to play supporting roles in television series such as Hill Street Blues and Simon & Simon. In 1987 he appeared in the film No Way Out with Kevin Costner. However, he also continued to appear in pornographic cinema and was dropped by his agent. Unable to find work and feeling betrayed, he slid into years of depression and substance abuse.

=== Cannibal Holocaust ===
In the DVD commentary for Cannibal Holocaust (in interview with Sage Stallone and Bob Murawski), Kerman described film director Ruggero Deodato as "remorseless" and "uncaring". Incensed by the realization during filming that an animal's death was not being faked, Kerman physically tackled the director and stormed off the set. He was not present when other animals, including a coatimundi, were killed. Kerman was also a guest-of-honor for the film's 35th-anniversary screening at the Alamo Drafthouse Cinema in Yonkers, New York, on February 28, 2015.

=== Later career ===
In the 2000s, Kerman played a sea captain in Sam Raimi's Spider-Man, and Dr. Monroe in the drama short Vic, directed by Sage Stallone. He made personal appearances at horror conventions to speak about his experiences on Cannibal Holocaust.

== Death ==
Kerman died on December 27, 2018, at the age of 71 of complications of diabetes.

== Filmography (selection) ==
- 1975: Anyone But My Husband (as Robert Kerr) - Director: Roberta Findlay
- 1976: Blow Dry (as Richard Bolla) – Director: David Secter
- 1976: Sex Wish – Director: Zebedy Colt & Victor Milt
- 1977: Punk Rock (as Richard Bolla) – Director: Carter Stevens
- 1977: Inside Jennifer Welles – Director: Jennifer Welles
- 1977: The Goodbye Girl – Director: Herbert Ross
- 1978: Debbie Does Dallas (as Richard Balla) – Director: Jim Clark
- 1979: For Richer, for Poorer (as Richard Bolla) – Director: Gerard Damiano
- 1979: Concorde Affaire '79 – Director: Ruggero Deodato
- 1979: The Concorde ... Airport '79 – Director: David Lowell Rich
- 1980: The Satisfiers of Alpha Blue (as R. Bolla) – Director: Gerard Damiano
- 1980: Cannibal Holocaust (Director: Ruggero Deodato)
- 1980: Eaten Alive! (Director: Umberto Lenzi)
- 1981: Amanda by Night (as R. Bolla) (Director: Gary Graver)
- 1981: Debbie Does Dallas Part II (as R. Bolla)
- 1981: Cannibal Ferox (Director: Umberto Lenzi)
- 1982: The Devil in Miss Jones Part II (as R. Bolla) (Director: Henri Pachard)
- 1982: The Clairvoyant (Director: Armand Mastroianni)
- 1982: Center Spread Girls (as R. Bolla)
- 1982: Mission Hill (Director: Bob Jones)
- 1983: Public Affairs (as R. Bolla) (Director: Henri Pachard)
- 1984: Liquid A$$ets (as R. Bolla)
- 1984: Death Mask (Director: Richard Friedman)
- 1985: Hot Blooded (as R. Bolla)
- 1985: Spitfire (as R. Bolla)
- 1986: Night of the Creeps (Director: Fred Dekker)
- 1987: Street Heat (as Richard Bolla)
- 1987: Corporate Assets (as R. Bolla)
- 1987: No Way Out (Director: Roger Donaldson)
- 1998: Men Under Water (Director: Douglas Morse)
- 2002: Spider-Man (Director: Sam Raimi)
- 2006: Vic (Director: Sage Stallone)

== Awards and nominations ==
- 1981 Adult Film Association of America Award – Best Supporting Actor (Outlaw Ladies) tied with Richard Pacheco
- 1983 Critics Adult Film Award – Best Supporting Actor (Devil in Miss Jones 2)
- 1997 AVN Hall of Fame
- 2008 XRCO Hall of Fame
