= Ruggero Deodato =

Italian film director and screenwriter (1939–2022)

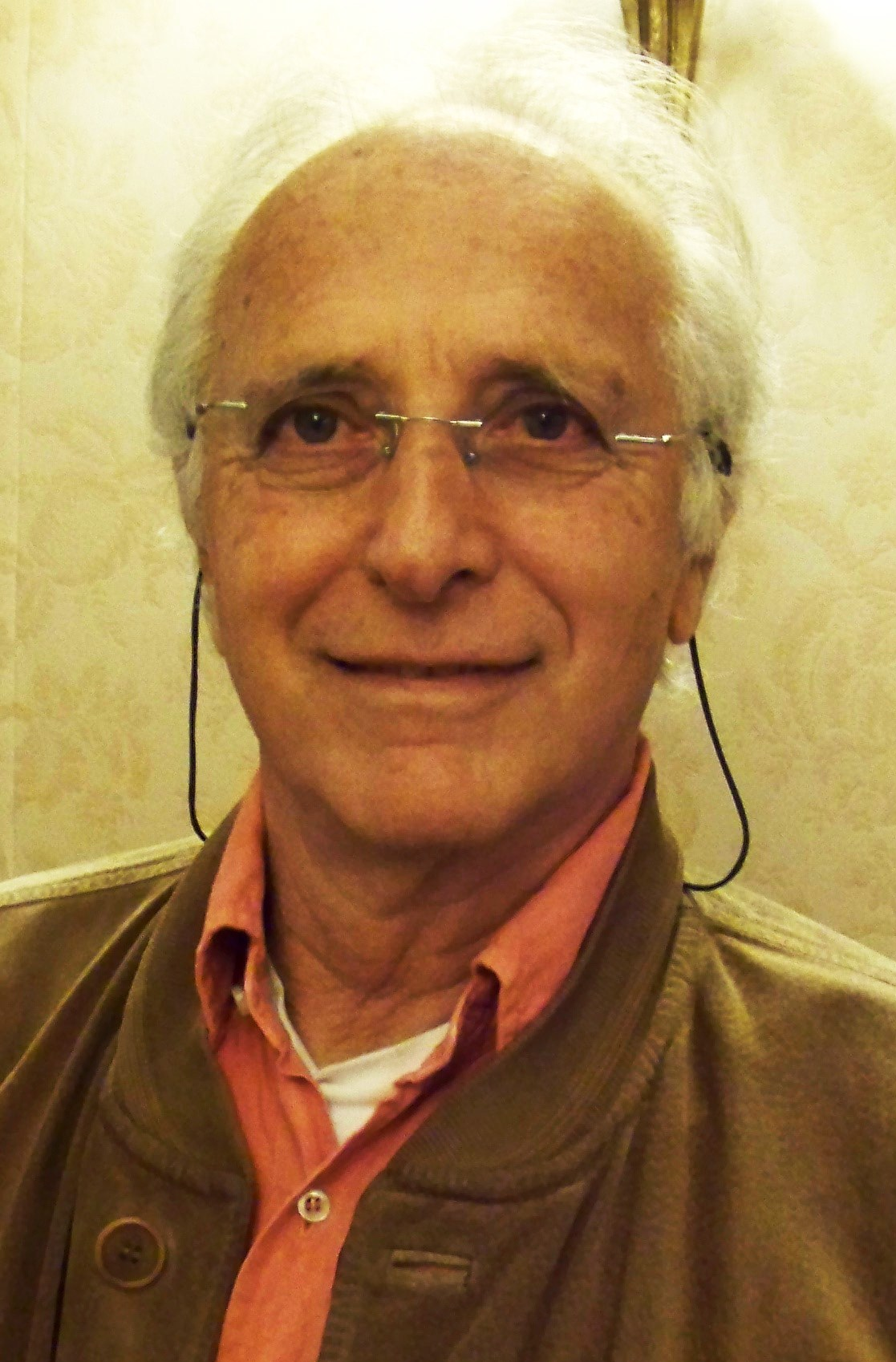
- Deodato at the 2008 Cannes Film Festival
- Born: 7 May 1939; Potenza, Lucania, Kingdom of Italy
- Died: 29 December 2022 (aged 83); Rome, Lazio, Italy
- Other name: Monsieur Cannibal
- Occupations: Director; screenwriter; actor
- Years active: 1959–2022
- Height: 1.70 m (5 ft 7 in)
- Spouse: Silvia Dionisio (m. 1971–1979)
- Partner: Micaela Rocco
- Children: 2

Signature
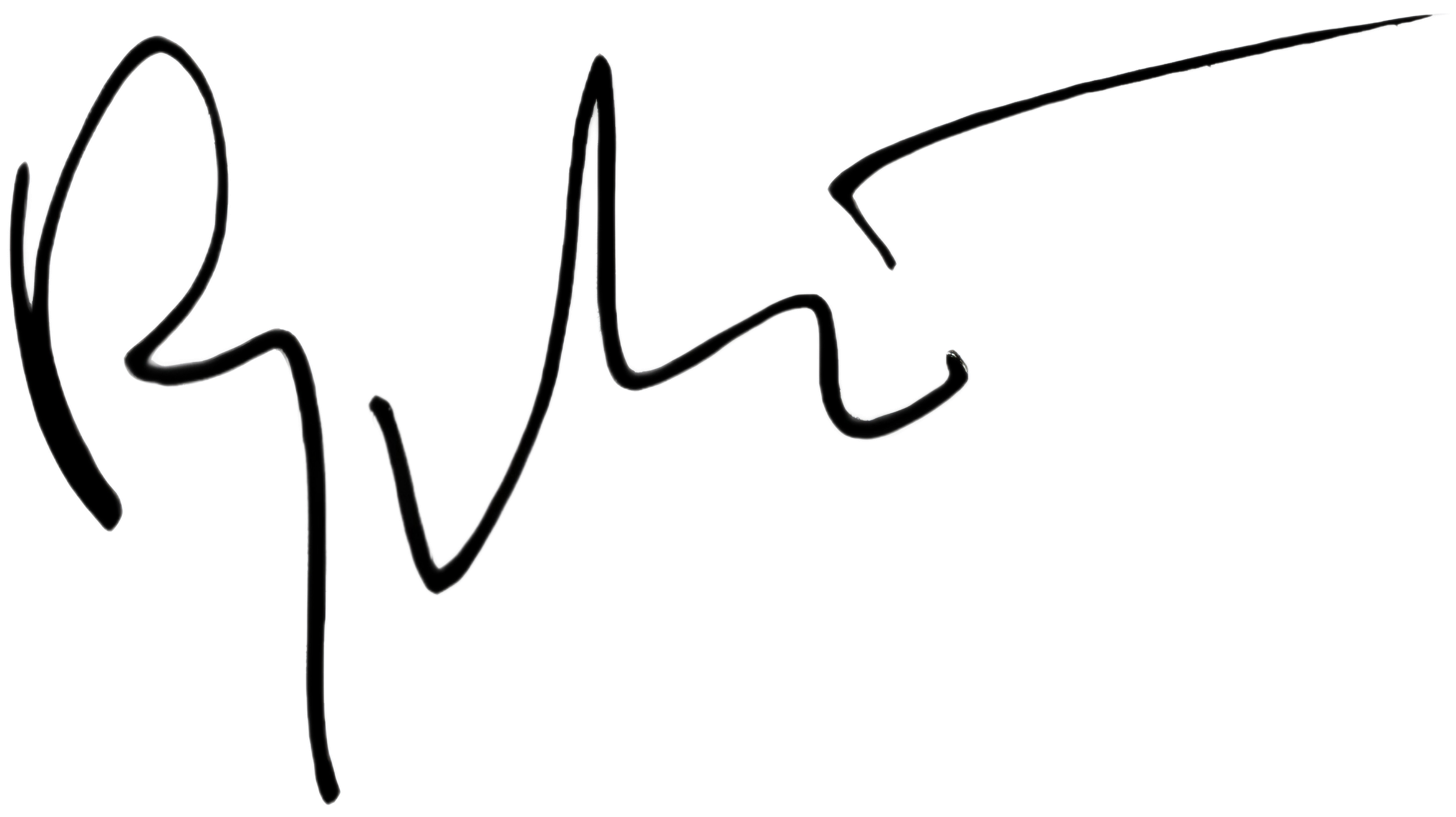

Ruggero Deodato (Italian: [rudˈdʒɛːro deoˈdaːto]; 7 May 1939 – 29 December 2022) was an Italian film and television director, screenwriter, and occasional actor.

His career spanned a wide-range of genres including peplum, comedy, drama, poliziottesco, and science fiction, yet he is perhaps best known for directing violent and gory horror films with strong elements of realism. His most notable film is Cannibal Holocaust, considered one of the most controversial and brutal in the history of cinema, which was seized, banned or heavily censored in many countries, and which contained special effects so realistic that they led to Deodato being arrested on suspicion of murder. Cannibal Holocaust is also cited as a precursor of found footage films such as The Blair Witch Project and The Last Broadcast. The film strengthened Deodato's fame as an "extreme" director and earned him the nickname "Monsieur Cannibal" in France.

Deodato was an influence on film directors like Oliver Stone, Quentin Tarantino, Eli Roth and Nicolas Winding Refn.

== Early life and career ==
Deodato was born in Potenza and moved to Rome with his family as a child. He went to Denmark and started as a musician playing piano and conducting a small orchestra at 7 years old. Once back to Italy, he quit music after his private teacher sent him away for playing by ear.

Deodato grew up on a farm and at eighteen grew up in the neighborhood where Rome's major film studios are located. Through a friendship with the son of Rossellini, it was there that he learned how to direct under Roberto Rossellini and Sergio Corbucci; he helped to make Corbucci's The Slave and Django as an assistant director. In the 1960s Deodato directed some comedy, musical and thriller films, before leaving cinema to do television commercials. In 1976 he returned to movies with the police film Live Like a Cop, Die Like a Man.

In 1977 he directed the jungle adventure film Last Cannibal World, also known as Jungle Holocaust, starring British actress Me Me Lai.

== Career ==
Italian: Io ho fatto solo due/tre horror, il resto sono film realistici.

I have only done two/three horror, the rest are realistic films.

— Ruggero Deodato,

=== Cannibal Holocaust ===
Late in 1979 he returned to the cannibal subgenre with the controversial Cannibal Holocaust. The film was shot in the Amazon rainforest for a budget of about $100,000, and starred Robert Kerman, Francesca Ciardi, and Carl Gabriel Yorke. The film is a mockumentary about a group of filmmakers who go into the Amazon Rainforest and subsequently stage scenes of extreme brutality for a Mondo-style documentary. During production, many cast and crew members protested the use of real animal killing in the film, including Kerman, who walked off the set.

Deodato created massive controversy in Italy and all over the world following the release of Cannibal Holocaust, which was wrongly claimed by some to be a snuff film due to the overly realistic gore effects. Deodato was arrested on suspicion of murder, and was subsequently forced to reveal the secrets behind the film's special effects and to parade the lead actors before an Italian court in order to prove that they were still alive. Deodato also received condemnation, still ongoing, for the use of real animal torture in his films. Despite the numerous criticisms, Cannibal Holocaust is considered a classic of the horror genre and innovative in its found footage plot structure.

=== Subsequent career ===
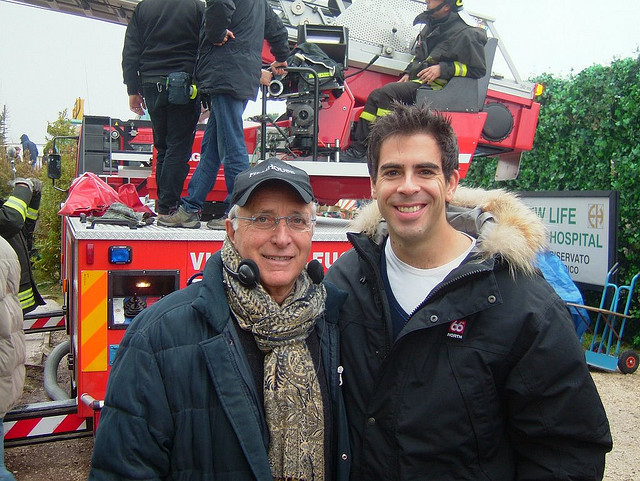
Deodato with Eli Roth in Rome during the press tour for Hostel

Deodato's 1980 film The House on the Edge of the Park was the most censored of the 'video nasties' in the United Kingdom for its graphic violence. His Cut and Run is a jungle adventure thriller, containing nudity, extreme violence and the appearance of Michael Berryman as a crazed, machete-wielding jungle man.

In the 1980s, he made some other slasher/horror films, including Body Count, Phantom of Death and Dial Help. In the 1990s he turned to TV movies and dramas with some success. In 2007, he made a cameo appearance in Hostel: Part II in the role of a cannibal.

Deodato made about two dozen films and TV series, his films covering many different genres, including many action films, a western, a barbarian film and even a family film called Mom I Can Do It. He was also helping to develop a cannibal-themed video game called Borneo: A Jungle Nightmare.

=== Unrealized projects ===
Throughout his career, Deodato was attached to a number of projects which either did not come to fruition or, for various reasons, were assigned to other directors. He was initially attached to The New York Ripper (Lucio Fulci), The Last Shark (Enzo G. Castellari), Casablanca Express (Sergio Martino) and Amazonia: The Catherine Miles Story (Mario Gariazzo).

Unmade projects included a snake thriller, Rattles, and a sequel to Cannibal Holocaust entitled Cannibal Fury, which was to enter production in 1983.

== Personal life ==
Deodato was married to actress Silvia Dionisio from 1971 to 1979. He had a son from the marriage. His partner was Micaela Rocco.

In 2019, the filmmaker was honored with a documentary about his life and career called Deodato Holocaust. Directed by Brazilian filmmaker Felipe M. Guerra, it was released in May of that year at the Fantaspoa Film Festival, in Brazil, with the presence of Ruggero. The documentary consists of a series of interviews that Guerra made with the Italian director, edited with images from Deodato's movies and personal photos. In 2021, Deodato Holocaust was released on Blu-Ray in Sweden and Germany – in limited media book format, containing also a 120-page booklet about Deodato's life and career. The documentary was later released in France and the United States, this time as a bonus feature in collector's editions of other films directed by Ruggero.

=== Death ===
Deodato died in Rome on 29 December 2022, at the age of 83, from complications of pneumonia, kidney failure, and liver failure.

== Filmography ==
=== Film ===
Year	Title	Functioned as		Notes
Year	Title	Director	Writer	Notes
1964	Hercules, Prisoner of Evil	Yes	No	Uncredited, replaced Antonio Margheriti
1968	Gungala, the Black Panther Girl	Yes	No	
1968	Donne... botte e bersaglieri	Yes	No	
1968	Vacanze sulla Costa Smeralda	Yes	No	
1968	Phenomenal and the Treasure of Tutankhamen	Yes	Yes	
1969	Zenabel	Yes	Yes	
1969	I quattro del pater noster	Yes	No	
1975	Waves of Lust	Yes	No	
1976	Live Like a Cop, Die Like a Man	Yes	No	
1977	Ultimo mondo cannibale	Yes	No	
1978	Last Feelings	Yes	No	
1979	Concorde Affaire '79	Yes	No	
1980	Cannibal Holocaust	Yes	No	
1980	The House on the Edge of the Park	Yes	No	
1983	The Atlantis Interceptors	Yes	No	
1985	Cut and Run	Yes	No	
1986	The Lone Runner	Yes	No	
1987	Body Count	Yes	No	
1987	The Barbarians	Yes	No	
1988	Phantom of Death	Yes	No	
1988	Dial Help	Yes	Yes	
1992	Mamma ci penso io	Yes	Yes	
1993	The Washing Machine	Yes	No	
2013	The Profane Exhibit	Yes	No	Segment: "Bridge"
2016	Ballad in Blood	Yes	Yes	
2019	Deathcember	Yes	Yes	Segment: "Casetta Sperduta in Campagna"

==== Acting roles ====
Year	Title	Role	Notes
1955	Destination Piovarolo	Pasquale	Uncredited
1976	Live Like a Cop, Die Like a Man	Man Walking out of Bank	Uncredited
1980	Concorde Affaire '79	Man on University Campus	Uncredited
1983	The Atlantis Interceptors	Colonel	
1986	Cut and Run	Man at Jonestown	Uncredited
1988	Phantom of Death	Man at Station	Uncredited
1988	Dial Help	Man in Phone Booth	Uncredited
1992	Mamma ci penso io	Street Photographer	Uncredited
1993	The Washing Machine	Nosy Neighbor	Uncredited
2007	Hostel: Part II	Italian Cannibal	
2008	Dead Bones	Butcher	Short film
2010	The Museum of Wonders		
2010	Nero infinito		
2013	Chimères	Butcher	
2013	H.P. Lovecraft: Two Left Arms	Ernesto	
2014	Phantasmagoria		
2016	Ballad in Blood	Professor Roth	
2017	Macho Man 2		
2017	Lilith's Hell	Himself	

=== Television ===
Year	Title	Functioned as		Notes
Year	Title	Director	Writer	Notes
1969	Il triangolo rosso	Yes	No	6 episodes
1971-73	All'ultimo minuto	Yes	Yes	13 episode
1974	Carosello	Yes	No	1 episode
1989	Il ricatto	Yes	No	2 episodes
1989	Ocean	Yes	Yes	6 episodes
1993	I ragazzi del muretto	Yes	No	8 episodes
1997	Noi siamo angeli	Yes	Yes	6 episodes
1998	Sotto il cielo dell'Africa	Yes	No	10 episodes
2004	Padre Speranza	Yes	No	TV movie
2005	Incantesimo	Yes	No	1 episode

=== Video games ===
Year	Title	Notes
2022	Borneo: A Jungle Nightmare	Script Director

== Bibliography ==
- Harvey Fenton, Julian Grainger, Gian Luca Castoldi, Cannibal Holocaust: And the Savage Cinema of Ruggero Deodato, FAB Press, 1999.
