= Ginny Mule Pictures =

Film production company

Ginny Mule Pictures was an independent film production company created by actors, Ray McKinnon, Lisa Blount and Walton Goggins. Ginny Mule was involved with producing four independent films, each featuring McKinnon and Goggins onscreen. Blount appeared in Ginny Mule's first three films, but died in 2010.

Ginny Mule first produced the black comedy short The Accountant, written and directed by McKinnon, about a ruthless and hard drinking accountant (McKinnon) who appears to help two family farmers (Goggins and Eddie King); the film received an Academy Award for Live Action Short Film after qualifying at the Atlanta Film Festival.

The company then created Chrystal, starring Billy Bob Thornton as an Arkansas ex-convict returning home after imprisonment to rekindle the relationship with the wife he left behind. McKinnon was nominated for the Grand Jury prize at the 2004 Sundance Film Festival for his writing and directing the film, while Blount was recognized by the 2004 Stockholm International Film Festival jurors as Best Actress for her portrayal of the title character.

In 2007, Randy and the Mob, a comedy written and directed by McKinnon, won both the Audience Choice and President's Awards at the Nashville Film Festival and was awarded the Spirit award at the Slamdance Film Festival.

Recently, McKinnon produced That Evening Sun, which starred veteran actors Dixie Carter and her real-life husband Hal Holbrook as a Tennessee couple who had lost their farm. The film, directed by Scott Teems, won many awards, including the Audience award for narrative feature and the Special Jury Award for Best Ensemble Cast at the 2009 SXSW Film Festival in Austin, Texas.
