= Hal Holbrook filmography =

American actor

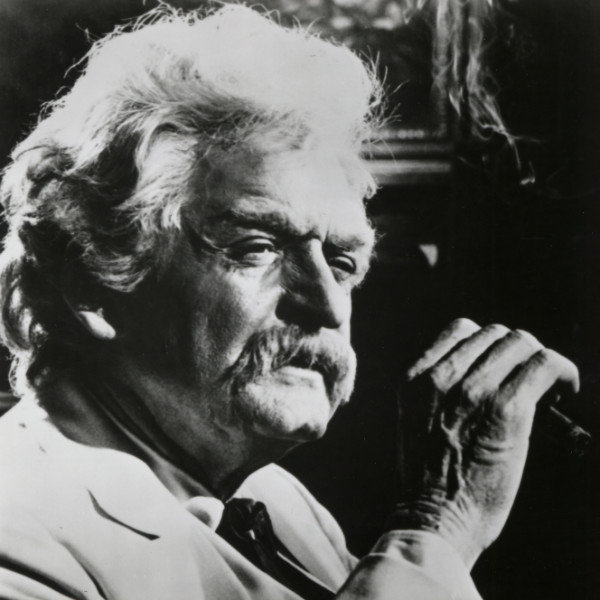
Holbrook as Mark Twain

Harold Rowe Holbrook Jr. (February 17, 1925 – January 23, 2021) was an American film, stage, and television actor. He was notable for his one-man stage show as Mark Twain.

Holbrook made his film debut in Sidney Lumet's The Group (1966). He later gained international fame for his performance as Deep Throat in the 1976 film All the President's Men. He played Abraham Lincoln in the 1974 miniseries Lincoln. He has also appeared in such films as Julia (1977), The Fog (1980), Creepshow (1982), Wall Street (1987), The Firm (1993), Hercules (1997), and Men of Honor (2000).

Holbrook's role as Ron Franz in Sean Penn's Into the Wild (2007) earned him both Screen Actors Guild Award and Academy Award nominations for Best Supporting Actor.

In his later career, Holbrook appeared as Francis Preston Blair in Steven Spielberg's Lincoln (2012), provided his voice as Mayday in the Disney animated film Planes: Fire & Rescue (2014) and as Whizzer in Blackway (2015).

== Films ==
| Year | Title | Role | Notes | Ref |
|---|---|---|---|---|
| 1966 | The Group | Gus Leroy | | |
| 1968 | Wild in the Streets | Senator Johnny Fergus | | |
| 1968 | The Brotherhood | Man at Table | Uncredited | |
| 1970 | The People Next Door | David Hoffman | | |
| 1970 | The Great White Hope | Al Cameron | | |
| 1972 | They Only Kill Their Masters | Dr. Warren Watkins | | |
| 1973 | Jonathan Livingston Seagull | The Elder | Uncredited voice | |
| 1973 | Magnum Force | Lieutenant Neil Briggs | | |
| 1974 | The Girl from Petrovka | Joe | | |
| 1976 | All the President's Men | Deep Throat | | |
| 1976 | Midway | Commander Joseph Rochefort | | |
| 1977 | Rituals | Harry | | |
| 1977 | Julia | Alan Campbell | | |
| 1977 | Capricorn One | Dr. James Kelloway | | |
| 1979 | Natural Enemies | Paul Steward | | |
| 1980 | The Fog | Father Malone | | |
| 1980 | The Kidnapping of the President | President Adam Scott | | |
| 1982 | Creepshow | Henry Northrup | Segment: "The Crate" | |
| 1982 | Girls Nite Out | Jim MacVey | AKA The Scaremaker | |
| 1983 | The Star Chamber | Judge Benjamin Caulfield | | |
| 1987 | Wall Street | Lou Mannheim | | |
| 1988 | The Unholy | Archbishop Mosely | | |
| 1989 | Fletch Lives | Hamilton "Ham" Johnson | | |
| 1993 | The Firm | Oliver Lambert | | |
| 1996 | Carried Away | Doctor Evans | | |
| 1997 | Cats Don't Dance | Cranston | Voice | |
| 1997 | Hercules | Amphitryon | Voice | |
| 1997 | Eye of God | Sheriff Rogers | | |
| 1997 | Trail of Hope: The Story of the Mormon Trail | Narrator | Documentary | |
| 1998 | Hush | Dr. Franklin Hill | | |
| 1998 | Walking to the Waterline | Man on the Beach | | |
| 1998 | Judas Kiss | Senator Rupert Hornbeck | | |
| 1998 | Rusty: A Dog's Tale | Boyd Callahan | | |
| 1999 | The Florentine | Smitty | | |
| 1999 | The Bachelor | Roy O'Dell | | |
| 2000 | Waking the Dead | Isaac Green | | |
| 2000 | Men of Honor | Mr. Pappy | | |
| 2000 | The Life & Adventures of Santa Claus | Ak – Master Woodsman of the World | Voice | |
| 2001 | The Majestic | Congressman Doyle | | |
| 2002 | Purpose | Tom Walker | | |
| 2002 | The Seventh Day Series | Himself | Documentary | |
| 2003 | Country Music: The Spirit of America | Narrator | IMAX | |
| 2003 | Shade | The Professor | | |
| 2007 | Into the Wild | Ron Franz | | |
| 2008 | Killshot | Papa | | |
| 2009 | That Evening Sun | Abner Meecham | | |
| 2010 | Flying Lessons | Harry Pleasant | | |
| 2011 | Good Day for It | Hector | | |
| 2011 | Water for Elephants | Old Jacob Jankowski | | |
| 2012 | Lincoln | Francis Preston Blair | | |
| 2012 | Promised Land | Frank Yates | | |
| 2013 | Savannah | Judge Harden | | |
| 2014 | Holbrook/Twain: An American Odyssey | Himself | Documentary | |
| 2014 | Planes: Fire & Rescue | Mayday | Voice | |
| 2015 | Blackway | Whizzer | | |

== Television ==
| Year | Title | Role | Notes | Ref |
|---|---|---|---|---|
| 1954–1959 | The Brighter Day | Grayling Dennis #1 | 302 episodes | |
| 1955 | Mr. Citizen | Don Gallagher | Episode: "Late for Supper" | |
| 1966 | Preview Tonight | Unknown | Episode: "The Cliff Dwellers" | |
| 1966 | The Glass Menagerie | Tom Wingfield | Television film | |
| 1967 | Mark Twain Tonight! | Mark Twain | TV special | |
| 1967 | Coronet Blue | Carey Thomas | Episode: "Faces" | |
| 1967–1968 | Off to See the Wizard | Narrator | Unknown episodes | |
| 1969 | The F.B.I. | Christopher Simes | Episode: "The Fraud" | |
| 1969 | The Whole World Is Watching | Chancellor Leonard Graham | Television film | |
| 1969 | The Name of the Game | Mayor John Adrian | Episode: "The Perfect Image" | |
| 1970 | The F.B.I. | Doug McElroy | Episode: "The Target" | |
| 1970 | A Clear and Present Danger | Senator Hays Stowe | Television film | |
| 1970 | The Wacky Zoo of Morgan City | Mitch Collins | The Wonderful World of Disney | |
| 1970–1971 | The Bold Ones: The Senator | Senator Hays Stowe | 8 episodes | |
| 1971 | Travis Logan, D.A. | Matthew Sand | Television film | |
| 1971 | Suddenly Single | Larry Hackett | Television film | |
| 1971 | Goodbye, Raggedy Ann | Harlan Webb | Television film | |
| 1972 | That Certain Summer | Doug Salter | Television film | |
| 1973 | Pueblo | Commander Lloyd M. Bucher | Television film | |
| 1974–1976 | Carl Sandburg's Lincoln | Abraham Lincoln | TV miniseries | |
| 1975–1976 | Great Performances | Theater in America Host | 2 episodes | |
| 1976 | 33 Hours in the Life of God | Dr. Simon Abbott | Television film | |
| 1977 | Our Town | Stage Manager | Television film | |
| 1978 | The Awakening Land | Portius Wheeler | TV miniseries | |
| 1979 | Murder by Natural Causes | Arthur Sinclair | Television film | |
| 1979 | The Legend of the Golden Gun | J. R. Swackhammer | Television film | |
| 1979 | When Hell Was in Session | Commander Jeremiah Denton | Television film | |
| 1980 | Off the Minnesota Strip | Bud Johansen | Television film | |
| 1981 | The Killing of Randy Webster | John Webster | Television film | |
| 1983–1988 | Portrait of America | Himself | 8 episodes | |
| 1984 | Celebrity | Calvin Sledge | 3 episodes | |
| 1984 | George Washington | John Adams | TV miniseries | |
| 1984 | The Three Wishes of Billy Grier | Grandpa Grier | Television film | |
| 1985 | North and South | Abraham Lincoln | TV miniseries | |
| 1985 | Behind Enemy Lines | Col. Calvin Turner | Television film | |
| 1986 | Under Siege | President Maxwell Monroe | Television film | |
| 1986 | Dress Gray | General Charles Hedges | TV miniseries | |
| 1986 | North and South: Book II | Abraham Lincoln | TV miniseries | |
| 1986–1989 | Designing Women | Reese Watson | 9 episodes | |
| 1987 | Plaza Suite | Sam Nash | Television film | |
| 1988 | The Fortunate Pilgrim | Dr. Andrew McKay | TV miniseries | |
| 1988 | I'll Be Home for Christmas | Joseph Bundy | Television film | |
| 1988 | Emma: Queen of the South Seas | Jonas Coe | 2 episodes | |
| 1989 | Day One | George C. Marshall | Television film | |
| 1989 | Sorry, Wrong Number | Jim Coltrane | Television film | |
| 1990 | A Killing in a Small Town | Dr. Beardsley | Television film | |
| 1990–1994 | Evening Shade | Evan Evans | 80 episodes | |
| 1993 | Bonds of Love | Jim Smith | Television film | |
| 1994 | A Perry Mason Mystery: The Case of the Lethal Lifestyle | William "Wild Bill" McKenzie | Television film | |
| 1994 | A Perry Mason Mystery: The Case of the Grimacing Governor | William "Wild Bill" McKenzie | Television film | |
| 1995 | A Perry Mason Mystery: The Case of the Jealous Jokester | William "Wild Bill" McKenzie | Television film | |
| 1995 | She Stood Alone: The Tailhook Scandal | Adm. Kelso | Television film | |
| 1996 | Innocent Victims | Bob Hennis | Television film | |
| 1997 | Operation Delta Force | Admiral Henshaw | Television film | |
| 1997 | All the Winters That Have Been | Uncle Ren Corvin | Television film | |
| 1997 | The Third Twin | Pete | Television film | |
| 1998 | Beauty | Alexander Miller | Television film | |
| 1998 | My Own Country | Lloyd Flanders | Television film | |
| 1999 | A Place Apart | Narrator | Television film | |
| 2000 | The Outer Limits | Justice Oliver Harbison | 2 episodes | |
| 2000 | Family Law | Judge Richard Lloyd | Episode: "One Mistake" | |
| 2001 | Haven | Harold L. Ickes | Television film | |
| 2001 | The Legend of the Three Trees | Narrator | Television film | |
| 2001–2002 | The West Wing | Assistant Secretary of State Albie Duncan | 2 episodes | |
| 2002 | Becker | Mr. Humphries | Episode: "And the Heartbeat Goes On" | |
| 2003 | Good Morning, Miami | Jim Templeton | 2 episodes | |
| 2003 | The Street Lawyer | Arthur Jacobs | Television film | |
| 2005 | Hope & Faith | Edward Shanowski | Episode: "A Room of One's Own" | |
| 2006 | The Sopranos | John Schwinn | Episode: "The Fleshy Part of the Thigh" | |
| 2006 | NCIS | Mickey Stokes | Episode: "Escaped" | |
| 2008 | ER | Walter Perkins | 2 episodes | |
| 2009 | Captain Cook's Extraordinary Atlas | Dean Davis Winters | Television film | |
| 2010 & 2014 | Sons of Anarchy | Nate Madock | 5 episodes | |
| 2010–2011 | The Event | James Dempsey | 10 episodes | |
| 2013 | Monday Mornings | Dr. Arvin Wayne | Episode: "The Legend and the Fall" | |
| 2013 | Rectify | Rutherford Gaines | Episode: "Modern Times" | |
| 2017 | Bones | Red Hudmore | Episode: "The New Tricks in the Old Dogs" | |
| 2017 | An American Conscience: The Reinhold Niebuhr Story | Reinhold Niebuhr | Voice, television film | |
| 2017 | Grey's Anatomy | Dr. Lewis Klatch | Episode: "'Till I Hear It from You" | |
| 2017 | Hawaii Five-0 | Leonard Patterson | Episode: "Waimaka 'ele'ele" | |
