= Blowback (Justified) =

- Justified episode
- Episode no.: Season 1 Episode 8
- Directed by: Jon Avnet
- Written by: Benjamin Cavell
- Cinematography by: Francis Kenny & Edward J. Pei
- Editing by: Keith Henderson
- Original air date: May 4, 2010
- Running time: 41 minutes

Guest appearances
- W. Earl Brown as Cal Wallace; Jere Burns as Wynn Duffy; M. C. Gainey as Bo Crowder; Rick Gomez as Assistant United States Attorney David Vasquez; Fredric Lehne as SWAT Commanding Officer; William Ragsdale as Gary Hawkins; Walton Goggins as Boyd Crowder

Episode chronology
← Previous "Blind Spot"	Next → "Hatless"
- Justified (season 1)

"Blowback" is the eighth episode of the first season of the American Neo-Western television series Justified. It is the 8th overall episode of the series and was written by Benjamin Cavell and directed by Jon Avnet. It originally aired on FX on May 4, 2010.

The series is based on Elmore Leonard's stories about the character Raylan Givens, particularly "Fire in the Hole", which serves as the basis for the episode. The series follows Raylan Givens, a tough deputy U.S. Marshal enforcing his own brand of justice. Following the shooting of a mob hitman, Raylan is sent to Lexington, Kentucky to investigate an old childhood friend Boyd Crowder, who is now part of a white supremacist gang. In the episode, Raylan takes part in a hostage situation on his building and tries to end it without having any casualties just as he is being investigated by Vasquez.

According to Nielsen Media Research, the episode was seen by an estimated 2.46 million household viewers and gained a 0.9/3 ratings share among adults aged 18–49. The episode received positive reviews from critics, with critics praising the writing and new prospects for the coming episodes.

== Plot ==
Ava (Joelle Carter) is eating at a diner when Bo (M. C. Gainey) suddenly appears. He explains that due to Sheriff Mosley's arrest, the authorities had to review his arrests and decided to release him earlier. Raylan (Timothy Olyphant) shows up and threatens Bo to leave. He once again tries to convince Ava to leave the area but she declines.

At home, Winona (Natalie Zea) finds a man named Wynn Duffy (Jere Burns), who claims to work for her husband's security. After he makes intimidating comments, Winona asks him to leave the house. When Gary (William Ragsdale) comes home, she confronts him for his association. He denies being involved with Duffy and gets angry when he finds that she sent Raylan to investigate his associates. Back in the office, Raylan is being tested by Mullen (Nick Searcy) as Vasquez (Rick Gomez) will soon want his cooperation. Suddenly, an inmate called Cal Wallace (W. Earl Brown) attacks guards and takes one of them hostage in the locker room. Their attempts at negotiation fail as Wallace lies about the meaning of his tattoos, explaining that he just wants to mess with the guards.

Wanting to avoid complicating his investigation, Raylan decides to help in the negotiation and stop a SWAT team from killing Wallace or the guards. He has Gutterson (Jacob Pitts) get fried chicken from a nearby shop so he can talk with Wallace and earn his trust. Eventually, Wallace agrees to surrender, allows himself to be arrested and the guards are released. In the aftermath, Vasquez suggests moving the interrogation for another day but Raylan decides to do it right then.

At the interrogation, Vasquez reveals his knowledge of Raylan's relationship with Ava, including intimate pictures of them. He states that Boyd's lawyer will want to associate Bowman's death with Raylan's arrival as a way to prove they were related before the shooting. Due to this, Boyd (Walton Goggins) will be allowed to be released from jail after pleading guilty to a minor charge, much to their disappointment. Raylan later meets with Boyd just as he is released from jail. Despite Boyd claiming to have found religion during his time in prison, Raylan says he will put him behind bars again. Boyd then meets with Bo outside the prison.

== Reception ==
=== Viewers ===
In its original American broadcast, "Blowback" was seen by an estimated 2.46 million household viewers and gained a 0.9/3 ratings share among adults aged 18–49, according to Nielsen Media Research. This means that 0.9 percent of all households with televisions watched the episode, while 3 percent of all households watching television at that time watched it. This was a 8% increase in viewership from the previous episode, which was watched by 2.26 million viewers with a 0.8/2 in the 18-49 demographics.

=== Critical reviews ===
"Blowback" received positive reviews from critics. Seth Amitin of IGN gave the episode a "great" 8.4 out of 10 rating and wrote, "The serialized parts of Justified haven't lived up to the lofty standards that the pilot episode promised yet. That's not to say the series has been bad to this point; on the contrary, it's been decent. Even I'm coming around to liking the episodic plots. But we're still being told the best stuff is yet to come every time a Crowder appears and the show has required quite a bit of patience from its viewers. I'd like to see less setting up of the pins and more knocking them down."

Alan Sepinwall of HitFix wrote, "Since it seems like most of my Justified reviews so far this season have been about the show's balance of serialized versus standalone storytelling, I suppose I should begin discussion of 'Blowback' by noting that the episode pretty much nailed the balance. Most of the hour was taken up with a done-in-one plot about Raylan playing impromptu hostage negotiator with hardened con Cal Wallace, but that story always played out in the shadow of the David Vasquez inquiry, with Vasquez himself in the room to watch."

Keith Phipps of The A.V. Club gave the episode an "A−" grade and wrote, "'Blowback' was another rock solid episode and one that got at what makes it work. Yes, hostage situations and the tense negotiations that accompany them are a staple for any cop show, but the episode kept finding ways to play against expectations."

Luke Dwyer of TV Fanatic gave the episode a 3.5 star rating out of 5 and wrote, "So here's to hoping for an unexpected twist and/or ending for Season one of Justified. We can specify season one because the show has been picked up for another 13 episodes in season two."
