= Blind Spot (Justified) =

- Justified episode
- Episode no.: Season 1 Episode 7
- Directed by: Michael Watkins
- Written by: Wendy Calhoun
- Cinematography by: Francis Kenny
- Editing by: Victor Du Bois
- Original air date: April 27, 2010
- Running time: 41 minutes

Guest appearances
- M. C. Gainey as Bo Crowder; Linda Gehringer as Helen Givens; James Immekus as Red; Ray McKinnon as Mr. Duke; David Meunier as Johnny Crowder; Brent Sexton as Sheriff Hunter Mosley; Walton Goggins as Boyd Crowder

Episode chronology
← Previous "The Collection"	Next → "Blowback"
- Justified (season 1)

"Blind Spot" is the seventh episode of the first season of the American Neo-Western television series Justified. It was written by executive story editor Wendy Calhoun and directed by Michael Watkins. It originally aired on FX on April 27, 2010.

The series is based on Elmore Leonard's stories about the character Raylan Givens, particularly "Fire in the Hole", which serves as the basis for the episode. The series follows Raylan Givens, a tough deputy U.S. Marshal enforcing his own brand of justice. Following the shooting of a mob hitman, Raylan is sent to Lexington, Kentucky to investigate an old childhood friend Boyd Crowder, who is now part of a white supremacist gang. In the episode, Raylan saves Ava from an assassination attempt and suspecting that the Crowders want her dead, sets to find out the killer. Despite being credited, Jacob Pitts does not appear in the episode.

According to Nielsen Media Research, the episode was seen by an estimated 2.26 million household viewers and gained a 0.8/2 ratings share among adults aged 18–49. The episode received positive reviews from critics, with critics praising the action and character development while its pace received a more mixed response.

== Plot ==
Ava (Joelle Carter) is shopping at a hardware store when Johnny Crowder (David Meunier) appears, asking for certain items for Bo Crowder, who is about to be released. He insinuates that Bo plans to use the items to kill Ava in revenge, but she nonchalantly offers to pay for him. Noting his intentions, Helen Givens (Linda Gehringer) threatens Johnny with a shotgun to leave the store. While talking to Raylan (Timothy Olyphant), Ava says that she is on probation and can't leave Kentucky, also admitting that she still feels shame for killing her husband. While they sleep, an assassin enters the house and tries to kill both of them but Raylan kicks the assassin out of the house and shoots at him, wounding him but the assassin escapes.

Raylan and Sheriff Hunter Mosley (Brent Sexton) decide to question Johnny about his possible involvement, citing his indirect threat at the hardware store. During the trip, Mosley confesses to Raylan his personal quest in finding Henry Crowder, who raped and killed his ten-year-old niece eight years earlier. They confront Johnny at a bar, finding no evidence that he was the assassin. Johnny admits having threatened Ava as a way to warn her to escape from Bo. Raylan then takes Ava to his office so she can be put in safe protection, where she runs into Winona (Natalie Zea). There, Mullen (Nick Searcy) angrily reprimands Raylan for sleeping with Ava as well as putting her life in danger when he shot in the house.

Raylan visits Boyd (Walton Goggins) in jail, accusing him of being involved in the assassination attempt. Boyd claims not to know anything but his comments irate Raylan, who attacks him and Raylan is taken out by security guards. Raylan calms down and returns to question him. Boyd then explains that Bo wouldn't hurt Ava for now and theorizes that the assassin wasn't trying to kill Ava, but Raylan. Somewhere else, Sheriff Mosley (Brent Sexton) meets with the assassins Red (James Immekus) and Mr. Duke (Ray McKinnon), revealing that he is involved with the Miami mob. He kills Duke and calls Raylan (who deduced his true intentions), and orders him to meet at a location as he has Ava hostage.

Raylan meets with Mosley and goes with him on his police cruiser and is ordered to follow the van where Red is holding Ava. Mosley reveals that he made a deal with the cartel: the cartel gave him the whereabouts of Henry Crowder after he sent Bo to prison and let them take over Bo's territory, and now they want his help taking out Raylan. Ava breaks free and attacks Red, causing the van to crash while Raylan subdues Mosley. Raylan and Ava reunite just as authorities arrive. In prison, Boyd is confronted by inmates for talking with Raylan and they prepare to kill him when Boyd's father, Bo (M. C. Gainey), interferes. Bo threatens everyone in the room to leave Boyd alone or he will have them killed.

== Reception ==
=== Viewers ===
In its original American broadcast, "Blind Spot" was seen by an estimated 2.26 million household viewers and gained a 0.8/2 ratings share among adults aged 18–49, according to Nielsen Media Research. This means that 0.8 percent of all households with televisions watched the episode, while 2 percent of all households watching television at that time watched it. This was a 9% increase in viewership from the previous episode, which was watched by 2.06 million viewers with a 0.8/2 in the 18-49 demographics.

=== Critical reviews ===
"Blind Spot" received positive reviews from critics. Seth Amitin of IGN gave the episode a "good" 7.9 out of 10 rating and wrote, "With all of the serialized content dropped in this episode and with all that's been built up to this moment, you'd figure 'Blind Spot' would have packed quite a punch. But a sour assassination attempt followed by watching the bad guys try to squirm away wasn't as entertaining. Like I said, it was a good episode, but it could have been better."

Alan Sepinwall of The Star-Ledger wrote, "We're very clearly pushing towards some kind of ultimate confrontation between Raylan, the Crowders and Miami in the second half, and I'm looking forward to every minute of it."

Scott Tobias of The A.V. Club gave the episode an "A−" grade and wrote, "The cat-and-mouse game between Raylan and Boyd could potentially go on forever — partly because it's never entirely apparent who's the cat and who's the mouse, and partly because neither one of them is willing to pounce. They simply bat each other around, because the bonds of the past are too great to crumble against the animosities of the present."

Luke Dwyer of TV Fanatic gave the episode a 3.5 star rating out of 5 and wrote, "Not every episode this season has been as engaging on so many levels as 'Blind Spot' was last night. We were given our largest helping yet of the Crowders vs. Ava, but with the twist that the first 40 minutes of the show was actually the Miami hotel vs. Raylan. Mix in the side story line about our wayward sheriff, Hunter Mosley and we have our most interesting episode of the season."
