= Bill Nunn =

American actor (1953–2016)

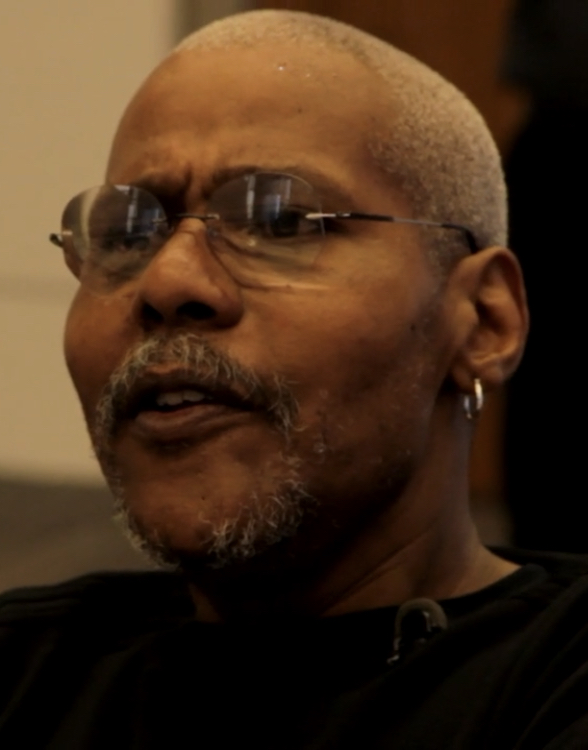
- Nunn in Introducing August Wilson (2013)
- Born: William Goldwyn Nunn III; October 20, 1953; Pittsburgh, Pennsylvania, U.S.
- Died: September 24, 2016 (aged 62); Pittsburgh, Pennsylvania, U.S.
- Education: Morehouse College
- Occupation: Actor
- Years active: 1980–2016
- Spouse: Donna Nunn
- Children: 2
- Father: Bill Nunn

William Goldwyn Nunn III (October 20, 1953 – September 24, 2016) was an American actor. He was known for his collaborations with director Spike Lee, notably as Radio Raheem in Do the Right Thing (1989). He also portrayed Daily Bugle editor Robbie Robertson in the Sam Raimi Spider-Man film trilogy (2002–07), and co-starred in the sitcoms The Job (2001–02) and Sirens (2014–15).

== Early life ==
Bill Nunn III was born in Pittsburgh, Pennsylvania, the son of Frances Nunn and William G. Nunn, Jr., a journalist and editor at the Pittsburgh Courier and a National Football League scout. His paternal grandfather was the first African American football player at George Westinghouse High School. While ball boys for the Pittsburgh Steelers, Bill Nunn and current Steelers president Art Rooney II stole "Mean" Joe Greene's car during training camp at Saint Vincent College in Latrobe, Pennsylvania. "Joe Greene showed up in a beautiful green Lincoln Continental, and me and Bill Nunn, Jr. were ball boys. Somehow Bill got the keys one night and we decided to take it for a ride. We only told Joe that story about 10 years ago. We figured that enough time had passed that we could disclose our little joy ride."

Nunn was a 1970 graduate of Schenley High School and a 1976 graduate of Morehouse College. He attended college with Spike Lee and appeared in several of Lee's early feature films.

== Career ==
Nunn made his credited film debut in the 1988 Spike Lee film School Daze, and is best known for his roles as Radio Raheem in Lee's Do the Right Thing, and as Nino Brown's bodyguard Duh Duh Duh Man in New Jack City. Some of his other film credits include Lee's Mo' Better Blues and He Got Game, as well as Regarding Henry, Sister Act, Canadian Bacon, The Last Seduction, Things to Do in Denver When You're Dead, Runaway Jury, Spider-Man trilogy (as Joseph "Robbie" Robertson), Firehouse Dog, the television series The Job, Randy and The Mob, and the 2016 televised adaptation of A Raisin in the Sun.

Nunn also performed on stage, including August Wilson's Fences, a Pittsburgh-based play in which Nunn performed with Anthony Mackie, who played Nunn's character's son. He was also very involved in community outreach, and he formed his own Pittsburgh-area outreach project in 2008.

== Personal life ==
Nunn was married to Donna Watts, and they had 2 children Cydney and Jessica .

=== Death ===
Nunn died of leukemia on September 24, 2016, at his home in Pittsburgh's Hill District; he was 62 years old.

== Filmography ==
=== Film ===
Year	Title	Role	Notes	Ref
1981	Sharky's Machine	Kitten's Bouncer	Uncredited	
1988	School Daze	Grady		
1989	Do the Right Thing	Radio Raheem		
1989	A Connecticut Yankee in King Arthur's Court	School Teacher		
1989	Glory	54th Massachusetts Soldier	Uncredited	
1990	Def by Temptation	Dougy		
1990	Cadillac Man	Grave Digger		
1990	Mo' Better Blues	Bottom Hammer (Bass)		
1991	New Jack City	"Duh Duh Man"		
1991	Regarding Henry	Bradley		
1991	White Lie	Chief Adams		
1992	Sister Act	Lt. Eddie Souther		
1993	Loaded Weapon 1	Police Photographer		
1993	Blood Brothers	William Crawford		
1994	The Last Seduction	Harlan		
1994	Save Me	Detective Vincent		
1995	Candyman: Farewell to the Flesh	Reverend Ellis		
1995	Canadian Bacon	Kabral		
1995	Things to Do in Denver When You're Dead	"Easy Wind"		
1995	True Crime	Detective Jerry Guinn		
1995	Money Train	Crash Train Motorman		
1996	Bulletproof	DEA Agent Finch		
1996	Extreme Measures	Detective Bob Burke		
1997	Quicksilver Highway	Len		
1997	Kiss the Girls	Detective John Sampson		
1997	Mad City	Cliff Williams	Uncredited	
1998	He Got Game	Uncle Bubba		
1998	Ambushed	Watts Fatboy		
1999	The Legend of 1900	Danny Boodman		
1999	The Tic Code	Kingston		
1999	Foolish	Jimmy Beck		
1999	The Hungry Bachelors Club	Moses Grady		
2000	Lockdown	Charles		
2002	Spider-Man	Joe "Robbie" Robertson		
2002	People I Know	Reverend Lyle Blunt		
2003	Runaway Jury	Lonnie Shaver		
2004	Spider-Man 2	Joe "Robbie" Robertson		
2006	Out There	Desmond		
2006	Idlewild	G.W.		
2007	Firehouse Dog	Joe Musto		
2007	Spider-Man 3	Joe "Robbie" Robertson		
2007	Randy and the Mob	Wardlowe Gone		
2008	Little Bear and the Master	The Warden		
2009	Help Me, Help You	Detective		
2012	Won't Back Down	Principal Holland		

=== Television ===
Year	Title	Role	Notes
1987	Vietnam War Story	MP #1	Episode: "The Pass"
1993	Bakersfield P.D.	Troy Davies	Episode: "The Ex-Partner"
1994	Traps	Cloud	5 episodes
1995	Chicago Hope	Tony Maxwell	Episode: "A Coupla Stiffs"
1995	Fallen Angels	Fearless Jones	Episode: "Fearless"
1995	The Affair	Sergeant Rivers	TV movie
1995	New York Undercover	Lieutenant Carver	Episode: "Internal Affairs"
1996	Touched by an Angel	Frank Champness	Episode: "Lost and Found"
1996	Mr. and Mrs. Loving	Leonard	TV movie
1997	Millennium	Lt. McCormick	Episode: "Maranatha"
1997	Ellen Foster	Mr. Douglas	TV movie
1998	Early Edition	Detective Barns	Episode: "A Minor Miracle"
1998	Always Outnumbered	Howard M'Shalla	TV movie
1999	Passing Glory	Howard Porter	TV movie
2001–02	The Job	Terrence "Pip" Phillips	Main cast
2001	The Substitute 4: Failure Is Not An Option	Luther	TV movie
2003	The District	Grant Singer	Episode: "Free Byrd"
2007	October Road	Leslie Etwood	Pilot
2008	A Raisin in the Sun	"Bobo"	TV movie
2014–15	Sirens	"Cash"	Recurring role; Season 1 Main cast; Season 2

== Theatre ==
Year	Title	Role	Notes
2004	A Raisin in the Sun	Bobo	Royal Theatre, New York
2009	Fences	Gabriel	Huntington Theatre Company
