= The Hungry Bachelors Club =

- Directed by: Gregory Ruzzin
- Written by: Fred H. Dresch; Ron Ratliff
- Produced by: Robert L. New; Dan Gifford; Amy Sommer
- Starring: Jorja Fox; Bill Nunn
- Cinematography: Robert F. Smith
- Edited by: Andrew Frank; Stephen R. Myers
- Music by: Larry Brown
- Distributed by: Mama's Boys
- Release date: November 12, 1999
- Running time: 93 minutes
- Country: United States
- Language: English

The Hungry Bachelors Club is a 1999 American film directed by Gregory Ruzzin, based on the novel of the same name by Lynn Scott Myers. The film was retitled Food for the Heart for its DVD release.

== Plot ==
Delmar Youngblood is a single mother with a passion for cooking; she dreams of opening her own restaurant called Food for the Heart, but in reality has a low-paid job as an insurance adjuster. Her best friend and roommate Hortense believes she would be a perfect wife for lawyer Stanley Diggers, though he wishes to advance his career before making a commitment. With their culinary talents and gift for hospitality, the two women host regular dinner parties for an assortment of family and friends. These include Jethro, Delmar's brother, who is a Mayan anthropology professor with an obsession for vintage Cadillacs, and his best friend Marlon, a freelance writer. There is also their pianist mother, Hannibal Youngblood, and her boyfriend, Mr. Ringold. When a friend of Hannibal's unexpectedly dies on one of these gatherings, her estranged daughter Missy Bainbridge comes to collect the body, and strikes up a relationship with Jethro.

While searching through a junkyard to rescue a doomed Cadillac, Jethro and Marlon meet and befriend Moses Grady, a former convict who joins the gang and finds new purpose when he becomes attached to Delmar and her dream. Things get serious when Stanley makes Delmar an offer: he wants her to become a surrogate mother on behalf of his bigoted boss Mr. Spinner, whose wife is unable to conceive. This arrangement would provide Delmar with the money she needs to open her restaurant, make Stanley a partner in his law firm, and give Hortense the engagement ring she craves. Delmar accepts, and opens her restaurant in partnership with Moses, but in the third trimester she decides to keep the baby.

== Cast ==
- Jorja Fox as Delmar Youngblood
- Bill Nunn as Moses Grady
- Suzanne Mara as Hortense
- Peter Murnik as Jethro Youngblood
- David Shackelford as Marlon Price
- Candice Azzara as Hannibal Youngblood
- Paul Provenza as Stanley Diggers
- Katherine Kendall as Missy Bainbridge
- W. Morgan Sheppard as Mr. Ringold
- Michael Des Barres as Mr. Spinner
