= That Evening Sun (film) =

- Directed by: Scott Teems
- Screenplay by: Scott Teems
- Based on: "I Hate to See That Evening Sun Go Down" by William Gay
- Produced by: Laura Smith; Terence Berry; Ray McKinnon; Walton Goggins
- Starring: Hal Holbrook; Ray McKinnon; Walton Goggins; Mia Wasikowska; Carrie Preston; Dixie Carter; Barry Corbin
- Cinematography: Rodney Taylor
- Edited by: Travis Sittard
- Music by: Michael Penn; Drive-By Truckers
- Production companies: Dogwood Entertainment; Ginny Mule Pictures
- Distributed by: Freestyle Releasing
- Release date: November 6, 2009
- Running time: 109 minutes
- Country: United States
- Language: English
- Box office: $281,350

That Evening Sun is a 2009 American independent Southern Gothic rural drama film directed and written by Scott Teems on a screenplay that adapted the 2002 short story, "I Hate to See That Evening Sun Go Down," by author William Gay. The film was produced by Laura Smith, Terence Barry, and actors Ray McKinnon and Walton Goggins, who both starred in the film.

Set in William Gay's native rural Tennessee, the film follows a widowed aging farmer, Abner Meecham, portrayed by Hal Holbrook, who is sent to a retirement home by his trial lawyer son Paul, portrayed by Walton Goggins, after Abner breaks his hip. Meecham sneaks off back to his family farm to discover that his son has leased the property to a "white trash" slacker, Lonzo Choat, portrayed by Ray McKinnon.

Meecham is forced to live in a sharecropper's shed when Choat moves his family, including his wife Ludie, portrayed by Carrie Preston, and his defiant teenage daughter Pamela, portrayed by Mia Wasikowska, into the farm's main residence. Meecham and Lonzo soon engage in hostilities, with Abner taking action when seeing a drunken Lonzo committing domestic abuse on his wife and daughter.

Filming took place in the East Tennessee region, primarily in and around the cities of Knoxville, Lenoir City, and Rockwood, during a 22-day period in the summer of 2008. Additional music for the film was provided by the Georgia-based Southern rock/alternative country outfit the Drive-By Truckers.

That Evening Sun premiered in March 2009 at South By Southwest, where it received the Audience Award for Narrative Feature and a special Jury Prize for Ensemble Cast. Joe Leydon of Variety hailed it as "an exceptionally fine example of regional indie filmmaking," and praised Holbrook's performance as a "career-highlight star turn as an irascible octogenarian farmer who will not go gentle into that good night." That Evening Sun also was screened at the 2009 Nashville Film Festival, where Holbrook was honored with a special Lifetime Achievement Award, and the film itself received another Audience Award.

The film opened in limited release in November 2009 and was released on DVD and Blu-ray Disc on September 7, 2010.

== Plot ==
Abner Meecham, an aging Tennessee farmer discarded at a nursing facility by his lawyer son Paul, flees the old folks home and catches a ride back to his country farm to live out his days in peace. Upon his return, he discovers that Paul has leased the farm to an old enemy and his family. Not one to suffer fools or go down easy, Abner moves into the old tenant shack on the property and declares that he will not leave until the farm is returned to his possession. But Lonzo Choat, the new tenant, has no intention to move out or give in to the demands of the old man.

Abner catches Lonzo beating his daughter with a garden hose after she was caught returning from dating a forbidden boy, and Abner scares Lonzo off by shooting a pistol in Lonzo's direction. The next day Abner has Lonzo picked up by the police, and Lonzo's wife Ludie is upset that she has to pay for bail, which they cannot afford. When the Choats come back from town, Lonzo is visibly upset, and kills Abner's dog Nipper and hangs him from the porch of the tenant shack. Abner disappears for two days, and the Choats suspect he has finally given up. Instead, he returns with Nipper's stuffed corpse, and sets him on the front porch and tells it to stand guard. Abner and Lonzo get into an arguing match in which Lonzo threatens to burn the shack down with Abner inside. The argument culminates with Abner pointing a pistol at Lonzo, but Lonzo easily disarms Abner. The police are summoned the next day, and Abner is forced to move out, partially by Paul, who believes he has lost his mind. Abner admits defeat and says he'll move out by the next morning. Instead he tells his neighbor that Lonzo has threatened to kill him by burning the shack. Abner, haunted by recurring dreams of his long-dead wife, then sets the shack ablaze, but stumbles while trying to exit, and he is rescued by Lonzo.

When Abner awakes, he is in the hospital with Paul by his side. He accepts that he will move into a retirement community, but insists that he will plant corn in his small garden there, instead of tomatoes as his son suggested. In the final scene Abner visits his house one more time; the house has been vacated by the Choats.

== Cast ==
- Hal Holbrook as Abner Meecham
- Ray McKinnon as Lonzo Choat
- Walton Goggins as Paul Meecham
- Mia Wasikowska as Pamela Choat
- Carrie Preston as Ludie Choat
- Barry Corbin as Thurl Chessor
- Dixie Carter as Ellen Meecham

The film would be Dixie Carter's final film credit.

== Reception ==
That Evening Sun has received mostly positive reviews from critics. On review aggregate website Rotten Tomatoes, the film has an approval rating of 81% based on 37 reviews. The site's critics consensus reads, "Powered by a formidable leading turn from Hal Holbrook, That Evening Sun is a prime cut of southern gothic that offers plenty of meditative atmosphere for audiences to brood over." On Metacritic, the film has a score of 75 based on 12 critic reviews, indicating "generally favorable reviews".

Joe Leydon of Variety called the film a "deliberately paced, richly atmospheric drama (that) also boasts first-rate work by a splendid supporting cast and impressive production values." Roger Ebert of the Chicago Sun-Times gave the film three and a half stars out of four, and called the film "...a drama set on a Tennessee farm that begins by looking like your standard old codger story and turns out, as Clint Eastwood's Gran Torino did, to be a lot more."

== Awards ==
- 2006 IFP Market Award - Emerging Narrative Screenplay Award
- 2009 Little Rock Film Festival - Best Narrative Feature Award
- 2009 South by Southwest - Narrative Feature Audience Award
- 2009 South by Southwest - Special Jury Award for Best Ensemble Cast
- 2009 Sarasota Film Festival - Audience Award for Best Narrative Feature
- 2009 Atlanta Film Festival - Jury Award for Best Narrative
- 2009 Nashville Film Festival - Official Selection; Audience Award; Lifetime Achievement Award (Hal Holbrook); Governor's Award (Dixie Carter)
- 2009 Memphis Indie Film Festival - Jury Award for Best Narrative Feature
- 2009 Sidewalk Moving Picture Festival - Best Director
- 2009 Newport International Film Festival - Special Narrative Feature Jury Prize; Student Jury Narrative Grand Prize
- 2009 Southeastern Film Critics Association Awards - Wyatt Award (awarded to a film that the captures the spirit of the South)
- 2009 Independent Spirit Awards 2009 - Nominated - Best Supporting Female - Mia Wasikowska; Best Supporting Male - Ray McKinnon
