= Holbrook/Twain: An American Odyssey =

2014 film directed by Scott Teems

- Directed by: Scott Teems
- Produced by: Laura D. Smith
- Starring: Hal Holbrook
- Edited by: Anthony Innarelli
- Music by: Heather McIntosh
- Distributed by: Aspiration Entertainment
- Release date: June 18, 2014
- Running time: 93 minutes
- Country: United States
- Language: English
- Budget: unknown
- Box office: unknown

Holbrook/Twain: An American Odyssey is a 2014 American documentary film directed by Scott Teems about actor Hal Holbrook's six decades performing his one-man show Mark Twain Tonight! The film was released in 2019. The idea for the documentary came from Dixie Carter, Holbrook's wife. It was shot in black and white.

== Subject matter ==
Mark Twain Tonight! was the longest-running one-man performance in theatre history. Hal Holbrook performed the show from 1954 to 2017 when he announced his retirement. Director Scott Teems, who had worked with Holbrook and Dixie Carter on That Evening Sun, interviewed Holbrook, family members, fellow actors, and Twain scholars to go behind the scenes to reveal the challenges and rewards of life on the road. Mark Twain Tonight! garnered a Tony Award and Emmy Award for Holbrook but took its toll on the actor and his family. The film captures Holbrook's honest assessment of the show and its effects on him, his loved ones, and his fans. Fellow actors weigh in on Holbrook's skill and influence. Performing in all 50 states and 20 countries, Holbrook performed as Twain behind the Iron Curtain and in the Deep South during the unrest of the Civil Rights Movement. His recollections and descriptions of events reveal a tumultuous and triumphant legacy.

== Production ==
Teems and his crew began filming the project in January 2010, including live performances of Holbrook as Twain. Segments of these performances augment the documentary as Holbrook describes his affection and respect for the author. The crew filmed in Hannibal, Missouri where Samuel Clemens (aka: Mark Twain) spent his boyhood and in Elmira, New York at Twain's graveside. Twain scholars viewed an early version of the film at Elmira College in 2013. Teems and his crew continued working on the film after it premiered at film festivals around the country.

== Cast ==
- Hal Holbrook
- Kurt Wagemann
- Cherry Jones
- Barbara Snedecor
- David Bradley
- Martin Sheen
- Richard Costabile
- Cindy Lovell
- Joyce Cohen
- Sean Penn
- Emile Hirsch
- Robert Patrick
- Annie Potts
- David Holbrook
- Eve Holbrook
- Shelley Fisher Fishkin
- Mary Dixie Carter

== Release ==
The documentary debuted at film festivals in 2014 and 2015 and was later released in 2019. The film is distributed by Aspiration Entertainment in Nashville, Tennessee. Sensing that Mr. Holbrook's record-setting run as Twain might be coming to an end, the filmmakers delayed their release in order to add to their story, including Mr. Holbrook's celebrated 90th birthday performance before a sold-out crowd in Twain's hometown of Hartford, Connecticut.

== Reviews ==
The American Film Institute selected the film to open its 2014 documentary festival. The Hollywood Reporter praised the film, writing, "One of the new sections at this year's LA Film Fest is called LA Muse, centering on films with a Los Angeles flavor. Most of the movies in the section are narrative features, but one documentary, Holbrook/Twain: An American Odyssey, stands out as one of the best films showcased in the entire festival." The Washington Post said, "Viewers expecting a bland, folksy portrait of two beloved American icons fusing in Holbrook’s one-man performance instead were treated to several of Twain’s stinging, occasionally cynical, barbs directed at mendacious and hypocritical politicians." Film Threat wrote, "In the end, like Holbrook’s enchanting rhythms on stage, “Holbrook/Twain: An American Odyssey” expertly catches the mesmerizing beats of a man who continues to share his life—in the guise of one of America's greatest humorists—with his adoring public."

== Awards ==
- Nominated – Atlanta Film Festival, Best Documentary Feature
- Nominated – Dallas International Film Festival, Best Feature Documentary
- Nominated – Little Rock Film Festival, Best Documentary
- Nominated – Los Angeles Film Festival, LA Muse Award
- Nominated – Nashville Film Festival, Documentary
- Nominated – Palm Springs International Film Festival, Best Documentary Feature
- Won – Santa Barbara International Film Festival, Best Santa Barbara Feature
- Won – Sarasota Film Festival, Artistic Portraiture
  - Nominated, Best Documentary Feature
