= Cut and Run (film) =

- Italian theatrical release poster
- Italian: Inferno in diretta
- Directed by: Ruggero Deodato
- Written by: Cesare Frugoni; Dardano Sacchetti
- Produced by: Alessandro Fracassi
- Starring: Lisa Blount; Leonard Mann; Willie Aames; Richard Lynch; Richard Bright; Michael Berryman; Eriq La Salle; Gabriele Tinti; Valentina Forte; John Steiner; Karen Black
- Cinematography: Alberto Spagnoli
- Edited by: Mario Morra
- Music by: Claudio Simonetti
- Production company: Racing Pictures
- Distributed by: CDE Compagnia Distribuzione Europea
- Release date: 8 August 1985
- Country: Italy
- Language: English

Cut and Run (Italian: Inferno in diretta, lit. 'Hell Live') is a 1985 Italian exploitation adventure thriller film directed by Ruggero Deodato, co-written by Dardano Sacchetti, and starring Lisa Blount, Leonard Mann, Willie Aames, Richard Lynch, Michael Berryman, and Eriq La Salle in his film debut.

The film is the third part of Deodato's "Cannibal Trilogy" - preceded by Ultimo mondo cannibale (1977) and Cannibal Holocaust (1980), and follows a news reporter caught in a war between drug traffickers and a murderous cult in the Amazon jungle.

== Plot ==
News reporter Fran Hudson and her cameraman Mark Ludman investigate a war in the jungles of South America between drug cartels and the cult-like army of Colonel Brian Horne, a Vietnam War veteran and former associate of Jim Jones.

== Cast ==
- Lisa Blount as Fran Hudson
- Leonard Mann as Mark Ludman
- Willie Aames as Tommy Allo
- Richard Lynch as Colonel Brian Horne
- Richard Bright as Bob Allo
- Michael Berryman as Quecho
- Eriq La Salle as Fargas
- Valentina Forte as Ana
- John Steiner as Vlado
- Karen Black as Karin
- Gabriele Tinti as Manuel
- Barbara Magnolfi as Rita
- Luca Barbareschi as Bud
- Penny Brown as Lucy
- Carlos de Carvalho as Tony Martina

== Production ==
Cut and Run was originally developed as a project by director Wes Craven with the working title Marimba. It was initially going to star Tim McIntire, Dirk Benedict, and Christopher Mitchum, with a screenplay written by Craven, Dardano Sacchetti, and Luciano Vincenzoni.

Shooting took place in Venezuela and Miami, Florida. Cut and Run was one of the earliest Italian films to be shot with live sync sound instead of MOS, as most of the cast were American and all dialogue was performed in English.

The film was produced in two separate versions, a "softer" R-rated cut intended for the North American market, and a "harder" version for theatrical release in Europe. The latter features additional, graphic kill scenes and gore not present in the former. Several key sequences were shot twice, once with a "soft" take, and a second time with a "harder" take.

== Release ==
The film was released in Italy on 8 August 1985. It was released in the United States by New World Pictures on 2 May 1986.

=== Home video ===
After being absent on home video for many years, the film was released on Blu-ray by Code Red, with a new 2K restoration of both the R-rated and Unrated cuts.

== See also ==
- List of Italian films of 1985
