= O'Neal Compton =

American actor and director (1951–2019)

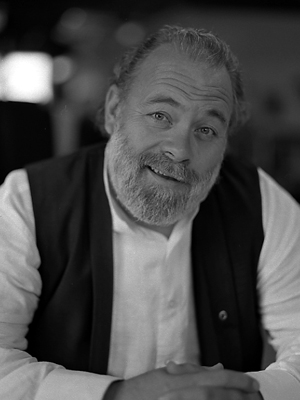
- O'Neal Compton in his studio in Venice, California in 1996
- Born: Belton O'Neal Compton Jr. February 5, 1951; Sumter, South Carolina, U.S.
- Died: February 18, 2019 (aged 68); Columbia, South Carolina, U.S.
- Education: Clemson University; Wofford College
- Occupations: Actor; writer; producer; photographer; director
- Years active: 1977–2019

Belton O'Neal Compton Jr. (February 5, 1951 – February 18, 2019) was an American character actor and director.

== Early life ==
He was born in Sumter, South Carolina, the son of educators Belton O. Compton Sr. and Dorothy Brunson Compton.

Compton was best known as a character actor in films and television, such as Life, Nixon, Nell, Primary Colors, Deep Impact, Seinfeld and Big Eden. He was also an award-winning writer, producer, photographer and commercial director.

Compton's photography was featured in exhibitions at the Michael Hoppen Gallery (London), Castle Haggenberg (Vienna) and in private galleries in Los Angeles, New York, Chicago, New Orleans and South Carolina. His photographs hang in the collections of many celebrities including Morgan Freeman, Johnny Depp, Billy Bob Thornton, Sir Anthony Hopkins, Sharon Stone, Elizabeth Taylor, John Travolta, Emma Thompson and Oliver Stone. Compton was commissioned by Jerry Seinfeld to create a series of his "slow speed" natural light portraits of the cast and crew in the last year of his show.

Compton attended Clemson University, for a year. Then, after a four-year stint in the United States Navy, he enrolled at Wofford College and "fell in love with campus life again". He coached football under Buddy Sasser and Ladson Cubbage. Compton's major field of study was biology, which he read every week, even 40 years later, but his passion was the theatre. In 1977, Compton discovered the Wofford Theatre Workshop, under the direction of James Gross.

Compton made his living as a film and television actor, screenwriter and photographer, and also as a commercial producer and director. His work took him to many places in the Americas and Europe. He lived in New York, Los Angeles, Buenos Aires, São Paulo, Rio de Janeiro and Florianópolis, Brazil.

Compton moved into a new home in western Sumter County, Florida, a cypress house on 9 acres (3.6 ha), with a saltwater pool and a private pond. He wrote screenplays and worked with his publisher and editor to complete a book about his life and travels.

== Death ==
On February 18, 2019, he died at the Dorn Veterans Affairs Medical Center in Columbia, South Carolina. He was 68 years old. The cause of death was yet to be determined.

== Filmography ==
- Kill Me Later (2001) - Agent McGinley
- Picking Up the Pieces (2000) - Texas John
- Big Eden (2000) - Jim Soams
- Life (1999/I) - Superintendent Abernathy
- Party of Five (1998) (TV series) - Les (1 episode)
- Deep Impact (1998) - Morten Entrekin
- LateLine (1998) (TV series) - Harlan (1 episode)
- Primary Colors (1998) - Sailorman Shoreson
- Orleans (1997) (TV series) - Lawyer Curtis Manzant (5 episodes)
- Seinfeld (1995–1997) (TV series) - Earl Haffler (2 episodes)
- Diabolique (1996) - Irv Danziger
- Shaughnessy (1996) (TV) -
- Nixon (1995) - Texas Man
- The Single Guy (1995) (TV series) - TY (1 episode)
- Coach (1995) (TV series) - Hal (1 episode)
- Lois & Clark: The New Adventures of Superman (1995) (TV series) - Gene Newtrich (1 episode)
- Nell (1994) - Don Fontana, Lovell's Attorney
- Roadracers (1994) (TV) - J.T.
- Rebel Highway (1994) (TV series) - J.T. (1 episode)
- Little Big League (1994) - Major League Umpire
- Murder Between Friends (1994) (TV) - Det. Easby
- Grace Under Fire (1993) (TV series) - Doctor (1 episode)
- Attack of the 50 Ft. Woman (1993) (TV) - Sheriff Denby
- Harts of the West (1993) (TV series) - (episode "The Right Stuff")
- The Thing Called Love (1993) - Singing Cop
- What's Love Got to Do with It (1993) - George (the Ramada Inn Manager)
- Made in America (1993) - Rocky
- When Love Kills: The Seduction of John Hearn (1993) (TV) - Minister
- The Positively True Adventures of the Alleged Texas Cheerleader-Murdering Mom (1993) (TV) - Principal James Barker
- The Wonder Years (1993) (TV series) - Zeke (1 episode)
- Home Improvement (1993) (TV series) - Phil (1 episode)
- Delta (1992) (TV series) - Mr. Boone (1 episode)
- A Message from Holly (1992) (TV) - Burly Man
- Parker Lewis Can't Lose (1992) (TV series) - Fez Man (1 episode)
- Quantum Leap (1992) (TV series) - Russ (1 episode)
- Brother Future (1991) (TV) - Turner
- Don't Tell Her It's Me (1990) - Gas Station Attendant
- Martin (1993) (TV series) - Trooper Williams (1 episode)
