= The Accountant (2001 film) =

2001 film

- Promotional poster
- Directed by: Ray McKinnon
- Written by: Ray McKinnon
- Produced by: Lisa Blount; Walton Goggins
- Starring: Ray McKinnon; Walton Goggins; Eddie King
- Cinematography: Blake B. Jackson
- Edited by: Joan Sobel
- Music by: Rusty Andrews
- Production company: Ginny Mule Pictures
- Distributed by: Lightyear Entertainment
- Release dates: January 2001 (Slamdance); November 3, 2009 (home video)
- Running time: 39 minutes
- Country: United States
- Language: English

The Accountant is a 2001 American independent Southern Gothic dark comedy short film written, directed by and starring Ray McKinnon and produced by Lisa Blount and Walton Goggins, who also stars in the film.

Set in rural Georgia, the film follows on the O'Dell brothers Tommy (portrayed by Walton Goggins) and David (portrayed by Eddie King), who seek the assistance of a mysterious unnamed accountant (portrayed by Ray McKinnon) to save their multi-generation family farm from foreclosure due to outstanding debt. Determined to save another family farm through rather unconventional methods, the accountant also takes the brothers on a crusade regarding his corporate conspiracies regarding the decline of American family farms and his quest to save Southern culture.

Filming took place in and around the cities of Douglasville and Covington in the state of Georgia.

The film premiered at the 2001 Slamdance Film Festival. In 2002, it won the Academy Award for Best Live Action Short Film. It received a video and DVD release in November 2009. The film has since become a cult classic.

The film was the inspiration for the Drive-by Truckers song "Sink Hole", from the album Decoration Day.
