= Chrystal (film) =

2004 drama film by Ray McKinnon

- Theatrical poster
- Directed by: Ray McKinnon
- Written by: Ray McKinnon
- Produced by: Peter E. Strauss; Bruce Heller; David Koplan II; Walton Goggins; Lisa Blount; Ray McKinnon
- Starring: Billy Bob Thornton; Lisa Blount
- Cinematography: Adam Kimmel
- Edited by: Myron Kerstein
- Music by: Stephen Trask
- Production companies: Ginny Mule Pictures; Panache Productions
- Distributed by: First Look Studios
- Release dates: January 16, 2004 (Sundance); April 8, 2005 (United States)
- Running time: 106 minutes
- Country: United States
- Language: English
- Box office: $80,858

Chrystal is a 2004 American independent Southern Gothic crime drama film, written and directed by Ray McKinnon and starring Billy Bob Thornton, Lisa Blount, Harry Lennix, Walton Goggins and Grace Zabriskie. The story is about a woman named Chrystal (Blount) who has been traumatized both physically and mentally from a car accident that took the life of her son. Joe (Thornton), Chrystal's husband, has just been released from jail after a 16-year sentence stemming from multiple crimes he committed. The film premiered at the 2004 Sundance Film Festival and was given a limited theatrical release on April 8, 2005.

== Plot ==
In Arkansas, a woman named Chrystal has become permanently injured, emotionally detached, and mentally unstable stemming from several traumatic events in her past.

The movie begins with Joe fleeing from the police in a high-speed police chase with his wife and son in the same car. While weaving down the mountain roads at a high speed, Joe loses control of the vehicle and ends up rolling down a hill and crashes into a tree. Chrystal suffers a broken neck in the accident. Their son, who the police presumed was flung through the windshield, was never found at the scene of the accident, or anywhere in the surrounding areas.

For his role in running from the police and causing injuries to his passengers, Joe is arrested and sentenced to 16 years in prison for a variety of crimes, including fleeing to avoid capture by police.

Upon his release from the state prison, Joe returns home in search of a change in his life. He ends up coming back home to his wife, who hadn't divorced him even while he was away in prison. Chrystal is a quadraplegic although she has regained limited mobility in her body; however, she has completely lost her enthusiasm, emotions, or will to live.

As Joe begins to slowly work his way back into her life, she is unsure of whether to accept him once again, fearing what may happen if she does so. He now wants to change and atone for his past life of crime. Forced to face his past to continue with his future, Joe runs into an old enemy of his, Snake. Worried about him, Snake invites Joe to rejoin him in his illegal drug operation.

== Cast ==
- Lisa Blount as Chrystal
- Billy Bob Thornton as Joe
- Walton Goggins as Larry
- Harry Lennix as Kalid
- Johnny Galecki as Barry
- Kathryn Howell as Miss Mabel
- Harry Dean Stanton as Pa Da
- Colin Fickes as Hog
- Max Kasch as Shorty
- Grace Zabriskie as Gladys
- James Intveld as Charlie
- Ray McKinnon as Snake

== Production ==
The film was shot in the Eureka Springs, Arkansas area of the Ozark Mountains.

== Release ==
The film had its world premiere at the 2004 Sundance Film Festival, where it competed in the U.S. Dramatic section. At the Stockholm Film Festival, Lisa Blount won the award for Best Actress.

The film was later released in the United States on April 8, 2005. In 11 weeks of limited release, the movie grossed $80,701. Its highest grossing week was in its second, where it grossed $19,074.

== Critical reception ==
Reviews for Chrystal were generally positive. On Rotten Tomatoes, it received an 80% score based on 20 reviews, with an average score of 7 out of 10. The website's critics consensus states: "Where Chrystal's going isn't always clear, but this slow-burning story proves effective -- and marks writer-director-star McKinnon as a multi-hyphenated talent to watch." The film was compared to other Southern films such as Tender Mercies and Thunder Road and praised for its dark humor and story of redemption.

Kevin Crust of the Los Angeles Times gave it 3 out of 5 stars and wrote: "Chrystal unravels a bit toward the end as it becomes more fable-like, but the performances make it worthwhile." Writing for the Austin Chronicle, Marrit Ingman similarly gave 3 out of 5 stars and said: "Blount’s performance is so brave it’s awkward to watch at times, uncomfortably open. The tone of the film teeters between gut-wrenching realism and grand, operatic fatalism. It’s a tricky balancing act, perhaps even a questionable and ill-advised one. But this is the kind of film you want to praise for what it attempts to accomplish, even if its success is mixed. Even at its most contrived, the filmmakers believe in this project so passionately that its atmosphere seems absolutely real." Todd McCarthy of Variety called it a "respectable piece of work [that is] reasonably involving if not compelling."
