= Ray McKinnon (actor) =

American actor (born 1957)

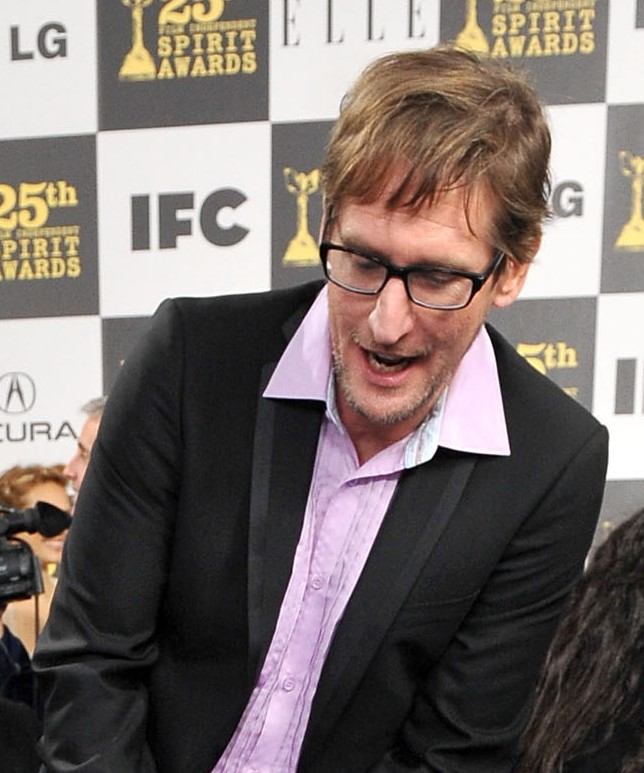
- McKinnon in 2010
- Born: Raymond Wilkes McKinnon; November 15, 1957 (age 68); Adel, Georgia, U.S.
- Education: Valdosta State University
- Occupations: Actor; screenwriter; director; producer
- Years active: 1989–present
- Spouse: Lisa Blount (m. 1998; died 2010)

Raymond Wilkes McKinnon (born November 15, 1957) is an American actor, screenwriter, film director, and producer. He appeared in television series and films, including Apollo 13 (1995), O Brother, Where Art Thou? (2000), the Oscar-winning short The Accountant (2001), Deadwood (2004), Sons of Anarchy (2011), and Mayans M.C. (2018–2023). He created the Sundance TV original series Rectify.

== Early life and education ==
McKinnon was born in Adel, Georgia.

In 1981, he graduated with a degree in theater from Valdosta State University.

== Career ==
McKinnon played Reverend Smith in the HBO series Deadwood. He played Lincoln Potter in the fourth season of the FX show Sons of Anarchy and in its spin-off series, Mayans M.C.

McKinnon, his wife Lisa Blount, and Walton Goggins founded a production company, Ginny Mule Pictures. The production company produced The Accountant, which won an Academy Award in 2001 for Live Action Short Film.

In 2004, McKinnon wrote, produced, directed and played Snake in the film Chrystal, starring Blount and Billy Bob Thornton. Chrystal made its debut at the Sundance Film Festival in 2004, where it was nominated for the Grand Jury Prize. At the 2004 Stockholm International Film Festival, Blount received a Best Actress award for her performance.

McKinnon wrote and directed the television series Rectify in 2013, the first original series from Sundance TV. The plot featured a man released from a Georgia state prison after 19 years on death row. The series ended in December 2016. The series won a Peabody Award in 2013.

== Personal life ==
McKinnon was married to Lisa Blount, an actress and producer, from 1998 until her death in 2010. He lives in Little Rock, Arkansas.

== Filmography ==
=== Film ===
| Year | Title | Role | Notes |
|---|---|---|---|
| 1989 | Driving Miss Daisy | Trooper #1 | |
| 1990 | Tune in Tomorrow | Cub Reporter | |
| 1990 | Vampire Cop | Raymond | |
| 1991 | Paris Trout | Carl Bonner | |
| 1991 | Livin' Large! | Harmon | |
| 1991 | Bugsy | David Hinton | |
| 1992 | The Gun in Betty Lou's Handbag | Detective Frank | |
| 1993 | Sommersby | Lawyer Webb | |
| 1993 | Needful Things | Deputy Norris Ridgewick | |
| 1993 | A Perfect World | Deputy Bradley | |
| 1995 | Apollo 13 | Jerry Bostick - FIDO White | |
| 1995 | The Net | Dale Hessman | |
| 1995 | The Grass Harp | Charlie Cool Jr. | |
| 1998 | Goodbye Lover | Rollins | |
| 1999 | This Is Harry Lehman | Harry Lehman | Short film |
| 2000 | O Brother, Where Art Thou? | Vernon T. Waldrip | |
| 2001 | The Accountant | The Accountant | Short film, writer and director |
| 2002 | The Pickets | Craig | Short film |
| 2002 | The Badge | Deputy C.B. | |
| 2003 | The Missing | Russell J. Wittick | |
| 2004 | Chrystal | Snake | Writer/producer/director |
| 2006 | Come Early Morning | Toby | |
| 2006 | Things That Hang from Trees | Tom Wheeler Sr. | |
| 2007 | Randy and the Mob | Randy Pearson/Cecil Pearson | Writer/director |
| 2008 | The Last Lullaby | Ominous Figure | |
| 2009 | That Evening Sun | Lonzo Choat | Producer |
| 2009 | The Blind Side | Coach Cotton | |
| 2010 | Spanola Pepper Sauce Company | | Director, Short film |
| 2011 | Take Shelter | Kyle | |
| 2011 | Hick | Lloyd | |
| 2011 | Dolphin Tale | Mr. Doyle | |
| 2011 | Footloose | Wes Warnicker | |
| 2011 | The Last Ride | Stan | |
| 2012 | Mud | Senior | |
| 2019 | Ford v Ferrari | Phil Remington | |
| 2020 | News of the World | Simon Boudlin | |
| 2021 | Chaos Walking | Matthew | |
| 2023 | The Dead Don't Hurt | Judge Blagden | |
| 2023 | Knox Goes Away | Thomas Muncie | |
| 2023 | Sick Girl | Malcolm | |
| 2025 | Violent Ends | Walt Frost | |

=== Television ===
| Year | Title | Role | Notes |
|---|---|---|---|
| 1989 | In the Heat of the Night | Timer | Episode: "Crackdown" |
| 1990 | Murder in Mississippi | Lyle's Father | Television movie |
| 1990 | Rising Son | Ken Mott | Television movie |
| 1990 | Web of Deceit | Stuart Troxel | Television movie |
| 1990 | When Will I Be Loved? | Man With Basketball | Television movie |
| 1990–1991 | In the Heat of the Night | Jethro Puller | 2 episodes |
| 1991 | Night of the Hunter | Ben Harper | Television movie |
| 1991 | In the Line of Duty: Manhunt in the Dakotas | Bob Cheshire | Television movie |
| 1991 | I'll Fly Away | Donny Hubbard | Episode: "The Hat" |
| 1991 | The Gambler Returns: The Luck of the Draw | Lee Bob | Television movie |
| 1991–1992 | Designing Women | Dwayne Dobber | 2 episodes |
| 1992 | In Sickness and in Health | Dr. Nyland | Television movie |
| 1992 | Taking Back My Life: The Nancy Ziegenmeyer Story | Les | Television movie |
| 1992 | Indecency | Victor | Television movie |
| 1993 | Arly Hanks | Hobert Middleton | Television movie |
| 1994 | Picket Fences | Jeffrey Murray | Episode: "Paging Doctor God" |
| 1994 | The Stand | Charlie Campion | Television miniseries; Episode: "The Plague" |
| 1994 | Sisters | Billy | Episode: "Protective Measures" |
| 1994 | Roswell | Deputy Joe Pritchard | Television movie |
| 1994 | Moment of Truth: Caught in the Crossfire | Buddy Rivers | Television movie |
| 1994 | The Boys Are Back | Bill | Episode: "The Fishing Trip" |
| 1994 | Matlock | Wade Parsons | Episode: "The Tabloid" |
| 1994 | Scarlett | Will Benteen | Television miniseries (2 episodes) |
| 1995 | Legend | Kyle | Episode: "Knee-High Noon" |
| 1995 | The Client | Lenny Barlow | 2 episodes |
| 1996 | Forgotten Sins | Steve Sweetler | Television movie |
| 1996 | Dead Man's Walk | Long Bill Coleman | Television miniseries (3 episodes) |
| 1996 | The Pretender | Lawson | Episode: "Flyer" |
| 1996 | Nash Bridges | Gary Graham | Episode: "Zodiac" |
| 1997 | Old Man | Shanty Man With Gun | Television movie |
| 1997 | Brooklyn South | Gilbert Van Eggidy | Episode: "A Reverend Runs Through It" |
| 1998 | Michael Hayes | Unknown role | Episode: "Devotion" |
| 1999 | NYPD Blue | Ted | Episode: "T'aint Misbehavin'" |
| 1999 | The Price of a Broken Heart | Diner Patron | Television movie |
| 1999 | Any Day Now | Unknown role | Episode: "You Really Believe in That Stuff?" |
| 2000 | Rocky Times | Sheriff Rick | Television movie |
| 2001 | The Practice | Frank Vaughan | Episode: "Suffer the Little Children" |
| 2002 | Philly | Dewey Hicks | Episode: "The Curse of the Klopman Diamonds" |
| 2002 | The X-Files | Mad Wayne | Episode: "Improbable" |
| 2004 | Deadwood | Reverend H.W. Smith | Recurring role (11 episodes) |
| 2008 | Comanche Moon | Bill Coleman | Television miniseries (2 episodes) |
| 2010 | Justified | Mr. Duke | Episode: "Blind Spot" |
| 2011 | Sons of Anarchy | US Attorney Lincoln Potter | Recurring role; 12 episodes (Season 4) |
| 2013–2016 | Rectify | | Creator/writer/executive producer/director |
| 2017 | Fear the Walking Dead | Proctor John | 2 episodes |
| 2018 | Law & Order: Special Victims Unit | William LaBott | Episode: "The Book of Esther" |
| 2018–2023 | Mayans M.C. | US Attorney Lincoln Potter | Recurring role; 17 episodes |
| 2019 | Wayne | Wayne McCullough Sr. | Episode: "Get Some Then" |
| 2019 | Heartstrings | Roy Meegers | Episode: "Two Doors Down" |
| 2019 | Reprisal | Tommy Quinn | Episode: "The Tale of Harold Horpus" |
| 2021 | Dopesick | Jerry Mallum | 7 episodes |
| 2023 | The Continental: From the World of John Wick | Jenkins | 2 episodes |
| 2026 | Dutton Ranch | Dwight White | 2 episodes |

== Awards and nominations ==
| Association | Year | Category | Nominated Work | Result |
|---|---|---|---|---|
| Academy Awards | 2002 | Best Live Action Short Film | The Accountant | Won |
| Atlanta Film Festival | 2001 | Best Narrative Short | The Accountant | Won |
| Atlanta Film Festival | 2001 | Southeastern Media Award | The Accountant | Won |
| Austin Film Festival | 2001 | Short Film Award | The Accountant | Won |
| Independent Spirit Awards | 2010 | Best Supporting Male | That Evening Sun | Nominated |
| Independent Spirit Awards | 2014 | Best Ensemble Cast | Mud | Won |
| Gotham Awards | 2011 | Best Ensemble Performance | Take Shelter | Nominated |
| Nashville Film Festival | 2007 | President's Award | Randy and the Mob | Won |
| Nashville Film Festival | 2007 | Audience Choice Award | Randy and the Mob | Won |
| Slamdance Film Festival | 2001 | Spirit of Slamdance Award | The Accountant; Randy and the Mob | Won |
| Sundance Film Festival | 2004 | Dramatic | Chrystal | Nominated |
| SXSW Film Festival | 2009 | Best Ensemble Cast | That Evening Sun | Won |
| Washington DC Independent Film Festival | 2002 | Best Fiction Short Form — Grand Jury Award | The Accountant | Won |
| Washington DC Independent Film Festival | 2002 | Best Fiction Short Form — Audience Award | The Accountant | Won |
| Writers Guild of America | 2015 | Episodic Drama for "Donald the Normal" | Rectify | Nominated |
