= The Quarry (2020 film) =

Mystery thriller film, directed by Scott Teems

- Theatrical release poster
- Directed by: Scott Teems
- Screenplay by: Scott Teems; Andrew Brotzman
- Based on: The Quarry by Damon Galgut
- Produced by: Laura D. Smith; Kristin Mann; Michael Shannon
- Starring: Shea Whigham; Michael Shannon; Catalina Sandino Moreno
- Cinematography: Michael Alden Lloyd
- Edited by: Saira Haider
- Music by: Heather McIntosh
- Production companies: Rockhill Studios; Metalwork Pictures; EFC Films; Prowess Pictures
- Distributed by: Lionsgate
- Release date: April 17, 2020
- Running time: 98 minutes
- Country: United States
- Language: English
- Budget: $4.4 million
- Box office: $3,661

The Quarry is a 2020 American independent neo-noir crime thriller film film directed by Scott Teems. It was written by Teems and Andrew Brotzman, who based their screenplay upon the 1995 novel of the same name by South African author Damon Galgut.

Set in the West Texas borderlands, the Southern Gothic and neo-Western film focuses on "The Man," an unnamed fugitive drifter, portrayed by Shea Whigham, who takes on the identity of David Martin, portrayed by Bruno Bichir, a traveling preacher he murders at a quarry after Martin picks him up off the side of a highway.

The Man finds refuge in a border town's dilapidated church, with a young woman named Celia (Catalina Sandino Moreno), who provides him with room and board at the house that Martin was set to reside during his stay in town.

Finding solace with his new persona, the drifter soon finds himself with a growing congregation at the church, drawing suspicion from the town's prejudiced police chief, John Moore (Michael Shannon), who is also having a secret affair with Celia.

It was released on April 17, 2020 in theaters by Lionsgate.

== Plot ==
Preacher David Martin finds a man unconscious at the side of the road in West Texas. David is traveling to the small town of Bevel to be the new preacher. When they reach a quarry nearby, the man kills David and heads to Bevel.

Arriving at the house where David was to stay, the man claims to be David, and is given room and board from Celia, girlfriend of Chief John Moore, of the three-man local sheriff's department.

Celia's cousins, adult Valentin and teenaged Poco, grow marijuana at the quarry. They steal the real preacher's belongings from the van, including bloody clothes. They later are arrested at the quarry, but the Chief finds David's body, and charge the cousins with murder.

The man is well liked by the local churchgoers, who think he is a good preacher because he does not judge them.

The Chief suspects that the man is guilty, but cannot prove anything. Valentin confesses to the murder, to save Poco. Valentin escapes the court, is shot by the Chief, but continues off into the darkness. The man happens to find him the next day, confesses that he did kill the real David Martin, and that he was on the run after killing his own wife and her lover. Valentin kills the man, before succumbing to his own wounds.

Celia and Poco leave town together.

== Cast ==
- Shea Whigham as The Man
- Michael Shannon as Chief John Moore
- Catalina Sandino Moreno as Celia
- Bobby Soto as Valentin
- Bruno Bichir as David Martin
- Alvaro Martinez as Poco

== Production ==
In April 2019, it was announced Shea Whigham and Michael Shannon had joined the cast of the film, with Scott Teems directing from a screenplay he wrote alongside Andrew Brotzman, based upon the novel of the same name by Damon Galgut. Filming took place in New Orleans and Garyville, Louisiana.

== Release ==
The film was to have its world premiere at South by Southwest on March 14, 2020. However, the festival was cancelled due to COVID-19 pandemic. It was then scheduled for an April 17, 2020 release.

== Reception ==
On Rotten Tomatoes, the film has an approval rating of 41% based on 46 reviews, with an average rating of 5.4/10. The site's critics consensus reads: "The Quarry's potboiler premise is largely squandered on a slow-moving plot whose meanderings thwart the efforts of a talented cast." On Metacritic, the film has a weighted average score of 53 out of 100, based on 14 critics, indicating "mixed or average reviews".
