= Murder Between Friends =

1994 American TV film

- Genre: Murder drama
- Based on: a true story
- Screenplay by: Philip Rosenberg
- Directed by: Waris Hussein
- Starring: Timothy Busfield; Stephen Lang; Martin Kemp; Lisa Blount
- Music by: Mark Snow
- Country of origin: United States
- Original language: English

Production
- Executive producers: Roger Gimbel; Orly Adelson
- Producer: David Hamburger
- Cinematography: Robert Steadman
- Editor: Paul Dixon
- Running time: 96 minutes
- Production companies: Gimbel-Adelson Productions; Multimedia Motion Pictures

Original release
- Release: January 10, 1994

Murder Between Friends is an American murder mystery television film of 1994, directed by Waris Hussein.

It is based on the true story of the murder of Janet Myers, a Louisiana woman killed in 1984 by her husband, or his best friend, or both of them.

== Outline ==
Close friends Kerry Myers (Stephen Lang) and Bill Fontanille (Martin Kemp) have a huge fist and knife fight at the Myers house in New Orleans. After it, Janet Myers (Lisa Blount) is found dead, beaten to death with a baseball bat, having spent the evening with her husband and Fontanille. Myers’s young son is also seriously injured, and Fontanille is admitted to hospital, bleeding from a stab wound to the belly. The two men accuse each other of murder, telling different stories to the police and later in court. Detective Easby (O'Neal Compton) has some trouble with what really happened, but to begin with the police believe Myers and charge Fontanille with murder. Later, District Attorney John Thorn (Timothy Busfield) grasps that the story is more complex and charges both men.

== Locations ==
The movie was largely filmed on location in New Orleans, but some scenes take place at Los Angeles City Hall and at North Spring Street, Los Angeles.

== Reception ==
Variety applauded "skilled direction" by Hussein, relaxed performances, and an unhurried pace. It also welcomed "a subtle and deceptively simple script by Philip Rosenberg".

== Cast ==
- Stephen Lang as Kerry Myers
- Martin Kemp as Bill Fontanille
- Lisa Blount as Janet Myers
- O'Neal Compton as Detective Pud Easby
- Timothy Busfield as John Thorn, District Attorney
- Karen Moncrieff as Amy Morin
- Sab Shimono as Dr Lee
- Nicholas Pryor as Judge Lamartine
- David Lee McLain as Clerk of Court
- Alex Courtney as René Le Gallais, Defence Attorney
- Stanley Anderson as Casey
- Macon McCalman as Janet Myers's lawyer
- Greg Almquist as Emile
- Lenny Wolpe as District Attorney
- Joey Zimmerman as Boy
- Buster Cooper as jazz trombone
- Chuck Thomas as tenor saxophone
- Johnny Kirkwood as drummer

== Real life events ==
In real life, on February 24, 1984, a ten-hour fight took place at the house of the Myers family at Harvey, Louisiana, just across the Mississippi River from New Orleans. Myers was left with a broken left arm and head injuries, Fontanille went to a local hospital with stab wounds, and Janet Myers was found beaten to death. Fontanille later admitted to having sex with Janet Myers the day before. Questioned by the police, Fontanille’s story was that Myers had killed his wife and child and planned to put the blame on him. Initially, Fontanille was charged with second degree murder, with Myers as a key witness, but at the end of the trial the jury was tied.

Later, both men were charged with the murder and with conspiracy. Myers waived his right to a trial by jury. Fontanille was acquitted on a charge of first-degree murder, and on April 5, 1990, was convicted of manslaughter and given a 21-year prison sentence, while a judge found Myers guilty as charged and gave him a life sentence.

While in the pen, Myers became the editor of The Angolite, a magazine published by the prisoners, and received an award from the National Council on Crime and Delinquency. In 2016, Governor John Bel Edwards commuted the sentence of Myers to thirty years, and he was released from the Angola Penitentiary on parole.

The story of the murder and the men’s trials is detailed in a book by Joseph Bosco, Blood Will Tell: A True Story of Deadly Lust in New Orleans (1993).
