= Lisa Blount =

American actress (1957–2010)

- Born: Lisa Suzanne Blount; July 1, 1957; Fayetteville, Arkansas, U.S.
- Died: October 25, 2010 (aged 53); Little Rock, Arkansas, U.S.
- Education: University of Arkansas at Little Rock; Valdosta State University; San Francisco State University
- Occupations: Actress, producer
- Years active: 1977–2010
- Spouses: Christopher Tufty (m. 1982; div. 1998?); Ray McKinnon (m. 1998)
- Awards: Academy Award for Best Live Action Short Film; 2001 The Accountant

Lisa Suzanne Blount (July 1, 1957 – October 25, 2010) was an American actress and film producer. She was nominated for the Golden Globe Award for New Star of the Year for her performance in An Officer and a Gentleman (1982), and later won an Academy Award for Best Live Action Short Film for producing The Accountant (2001).

== Early life ==
Lisa Suzanne Blount was born on July 1, 1957, in Fayetteville, Arkansas, to Margaret Louise Martin and Glen Roscoe Blount, and was raised in Jacksonville, Arkansas. She attended Jacksonville High School and graduated in 1975. Blount studied theatre at the University of Arkansas at Little Rock, and Valdosta State University in Georgia.

== Career ==
After several small television roles and in films like September 30, 1955 and Dead & Buried, Blount received a Golden Globe nomination for New Star of the Year for her performance as Lynette Pomeroy in An Officer and a Gentleman (1982).

Blount subsequently appeared in several "scream queen" horror film roles, including What Waits Below (1984, dir. Don Sharp), Cut and Run (1985, dir. Ruggero Deodato), Nightflyers (1987, dir. Robert Collector) and most notably John Carpenter's 1987 cult classic Prince of Darkness. Another role was that of Jim Profit's stepmother Bobbi Stakowski in the television series Profit. She appeared in season two of Moonlighting in the episode "Sleep Talkin' Guy" (1986).

Blount returned to college in 1986, this time at San Francisco State University (SFSU), where she completed her degree in Theater Arts and spent the 1986/1987 academic year competing on SFSU's Forensics (Speech and Debate) Team. In the fall of 1987, Blount was cast as the female lead in the American Conservatory Theater's revival of the musical Hair.

Blount later became a producer, and with her husband Ray McKinnon, won the Academy Award in 2001 for best live action short film for the film The Accountant. That film also credits her as wardrobe mistress. Blount produced and acted in Chrystal, which starred Billy Bob Thornton and was directed by McKinnon.

Blount's last acting role was in the film Randy and the Mob, which she also produced and was directed by McKinnon.

== Death ==
Blount was found dead in her home in Little Rock, Arkansas by her mother on October 27, 2010. The coroner told the Arkansas Democrat-Gazette that Blount appeared to have died two days earlier, on October 25. No foul play was suspected, according to the Pulaski County coroner.

Although the coroner did not release an official cause of death, Blount's mother told RadarOnline.com that her daughter had had idiopathic thrombocytopenic purpura (ITP), in which low levels of platelets keep blood from clotting and lead to bleeding and bruising. "I think that might have been part of the problem when she passed away because when I found her she had a purple look on her neck that looked like blood on the surface".

== Filmography ==
Film
Year	Title	Role	Notes
1977	September 30, 1955	Billie Jean Turner	
1979	The Swap	Vivan Buck	
1981	Dead & Buried	Lisa	
1982	An Officer and a Gentleman	Lynette Pomeroy	Nominated—Golden Globe Award for New Star of the Year
1984	What Waits Below	Leslie Peterson	
1985	Radioactive Dreams	Miles Archer	
1985	Cut and Run	Fran Hudson	
1985	Cease Fire	Paula Murphy	
1987	Nightflyers	Audrey	
1987	Prince of Darkness	Catherine Danforth	
1988	South of Reno	Anette Clark	
1989	Out Cold	Phyllis	
1989	Great Balls of Fire!	Lois Brown	
1989	Blind Fury	Annie Winchester	
1991	Femme Fatale	Jenny Purge	
1993	Needful Things	Cora Rusk	Uncredited
1994	Stalked	Janie	
1994	Murder Between Friends	Janet Myers	
1994	Judicial Consent	Theresa Lewis	
1996	Box of Moonlight	Purlene Dupre	
1999	If... Dog... Rabbit...	Sarah Cooper-Toole	
2001	The Accountant	—N/a	Short film; executive producer only Academy Award for Best Short Film, Live Action (shared with Ray McKinnon); Spirit of Slamdance Award (shared with Ray McKinnon & Walton Goggins)
2002	A.K.A. Birdseye	Vicky Sharpless	
2005	Chrystal	Chrystal	Also producer Best Actress Award – Stockholm Film Festival
2007	Randy and the Mob	Charlotte Pearson	Also producer

Television
Year	Title	Role	Notes
1977	The Gong Show	Appears on The Gong Show	Episode: Same episode with Pee Wee Herman
1982	Seven Brides for Seven Brothers	Talley	Episode: "Daniel's Song"
1983	Murder Me, Murder You	Michelle Jameson	Television film
1984	Boone	Sonny Watson	Episode: "Hard to Get"
1985	Stormin' Home	Sissy Rigetti	Television film
1986	Moonlighting	Toby	Episode: "Sleep Talkin' Guy"
1986	Annihilator	Cindy	Television film
1986	Deadly Nightmares	Miranda	Episode: "One Last Prayer"
1986	Starman	Angela	Episode: "Secrets"
1987	Magnum, P.I.	Andrea Nicholson	Episode: "Out of Sync"
1988	CBS Summer Playhouse	Pat Yaraslovsky	Episode: "Off Duty"
1988	Unholy Matrimony	Karen Sader	Television film
1990	Murder, She Wrote	Andrea Bascomb Douglas	Episode: "Always a Thief"
1991	Sons and Daughters	Mary Ruth Hammersmith	7 episodes
1992	In Sickness and in Health	Carmen	Television film
1992	Picket Fences	Melanie Marino	Episode: "Pilot"
1992	An American Story	Becky Meadows	Television film
1994	Murder Between Friends	Janet Myers	Television film
1995	The Client	Bernice	Episode: "Them That Has..."
1997	Get to the Heart: The Barbara Mandrell Story	Mary Mandrell	Television film
1997	Fitz	Diana Falls	Episode: "Sons and Lovers"
1996–1997	Profit	Bobbi Stakowski	Lead role; 8 episodes
1999	Traffic		Television mini-series
2002	Judging Amy	Jean Collins	Episode: "Every Stranger's Face I See"
2003	Trash	Lisa	Television film
