= Randy and the Mob =

2007 film by Ray McKinnon

- Directed by: Ray McKinnon
- Written by: Ray McKinnon
- Produced by: Lisa Blount; Walton Goggins; Benjy Griffith; David Koplan; D. Scott Lumpkin; Phil Walden
- Starring: Ray McKinnon; Lisa Blount; Walton Goggins; Bill Nunn; Burt Reynolds
- Cinematography: Jonathan Sela
- Edited by: Jim Makiej
- Music by: John Swihart
- Distributed by: Vivendi Entertainment; Lightyear Entertainment
- Release dates: October 13, 2007 (Austin Film Festival); September 1, 2009 (United States)
- Running time: 91 minutes
- Country: United States
- Language: English

Randy and the Mob is a 2007 American independent deadpan comedy crime film written and directed by Ray McKinnon. It stars McKinnon, Lisa Blount, Walton Goggins and Bill Nunn, with a cameo by Burt Reynolds.

Randy and the Mob was filmed in August 2005 in several locations in and around Atlanta, Georgia, mostly in Villa Rica, Georgia. The film won the Audience Choice Award at the Nashville Film Festival.

== Plot ==
Good ol' boy Randy Pearson, a can't-win entrepreneur, finds himself in debt to mobsters when his latest scheme to keep his businesses afloat goes awry. With the IRS after him as well, he seeks a helping hand from his carpal-tunneled, baton-teaching wife, Charlotte; his estranged, gay twin brother, Cecil, and Tino Armani, a mysterious self-styled prophet with a knack for high fashion, Italian cooking and clog dancing.

== Cast ==
- Ray McKinnon as Randy and Cecil Pearson
- Walton Goggins as Tino Armani
- Lisa Blount as Charlotte Pearson
- Tim DeKay as Bill
- Bill Nunn as Wardlowe
- Brent Briscoe as Officier Griff Postell
- Paul Ben-Victor as Franco
- Sam Frihart as Four
- Burt Reynolds as Elmore Culpepper (uncredited)

== Soundtrack ==
Released on CD by Lakeshore Records in September 2007, the Randy and the Mob soundtrack includes tracks by Andrew Bird's Bowl of Fire, My Morning Jacket, Ron Sexsmith, Brazzaville, Squirrel Nut Zippers, Bent Fabric, Patterson Hood, The Now People, Lance Palmer and the Dead Rebels, and John Swihart.
