= Hal Holbrook =

American actor (1925–2021)

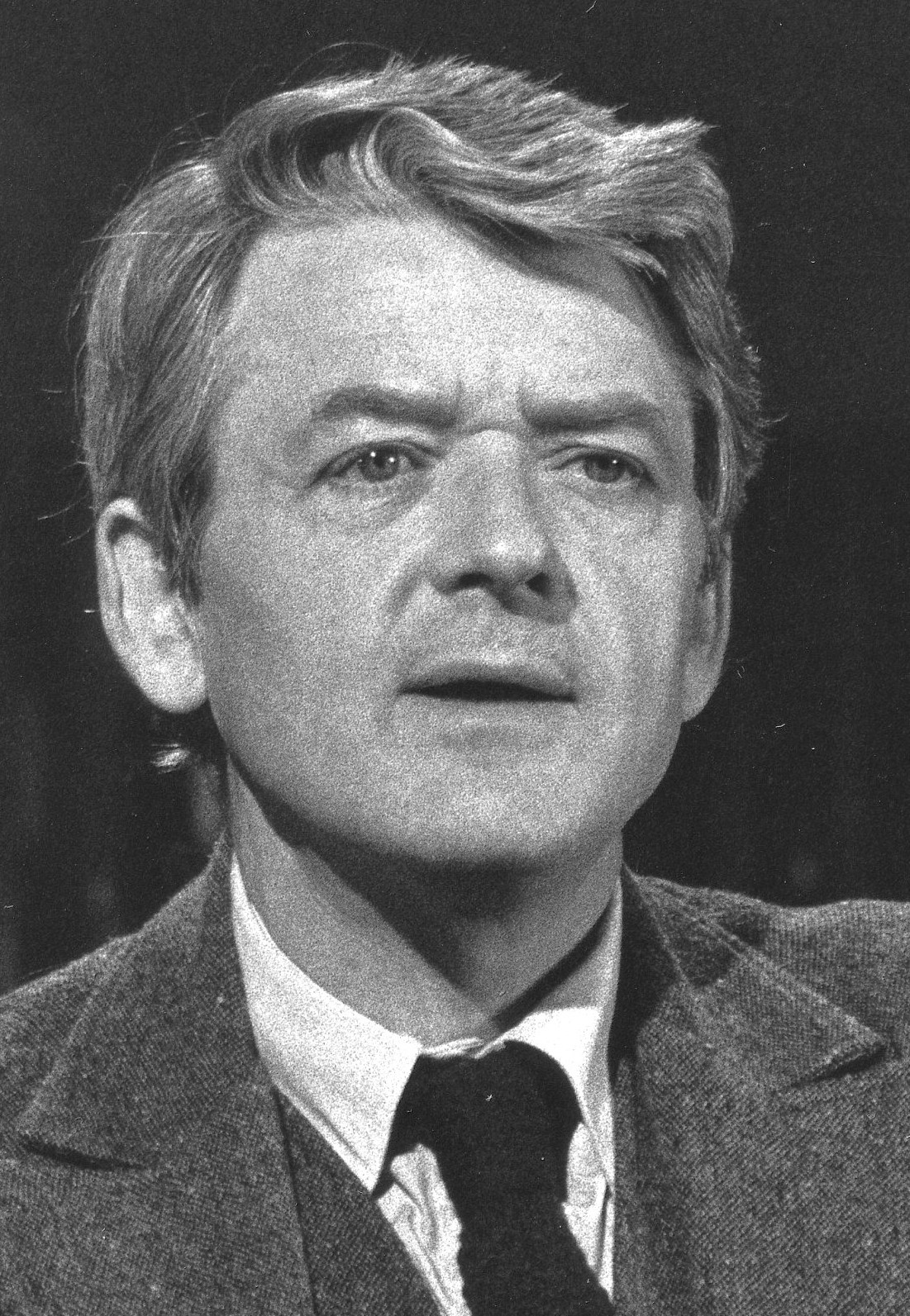
- Holbrook in 1977
- Born: Harold Rowe Holbrook Jr. February 17, 1925; Cleveland, Ohio, U.S.
- Died: January 23, 2021 (aged 95); Beverly Hills, California, U.S.
- Resting place: McLemoresville Cemetery, Tennessee
- Education: Denison University
- Occupation: Actor
- Years active: 1954–2017
- Spouses: Ruby Elaine Johnston (m. 1945; div. 1965) Carol Rossen (m. 1966; div. 1983) Dixie Carter (m. 1984; died 2010)
- Awards: See Awards and nominations
- Military career
- Allegiance: United States
- Branch: United States Army
- Service years: 1942–46
- Rank: Staff sergeant
- Conflicts: World War II

Harold Rowe Holbrook Jr. (February 17, 1925 – January 23, 2021) was an American actor. He first received critical acclaim in 1954 for a one-man stage show, titled Mark Twain Tonight!, that he developed while studying at Denison University. He won the Tony Award for Best Actor in a Play in 1966 for his portrayal of Twain. He continued to perform his signature role for more than 60 years, retiring the show in 2017 due to his failing health. Throughout his career, he also won five Primetime Emmy Awards for his work on television and was nominated for an Academy Award for his work in film.

Holbrook made his film debut in Sidney Lumet's The Group (1966). He later gained international fame for his performance as Deep Throat in the 1976 film All the President's Men. He played Abraham Lincoln in the 1974 miniseries Lincoln and the 1985 miniseries North and South. He also appeared in films such as Magnum Force (1973), Julia, Capricorn One (both 1977), The Fog (1980), Creepshow (1982), Wall Street (1987), The Firm (1993), Hercules (1997) and Men of Honor (2000).

Holbrook's role as Ron Franz in Sean Penn's Into the Wild (2007) earned nominations for both an Academy Award and a Screen Actors Guild Award in the best supporting actor category. In 2009, he received critical acclaim for his performance as recently retired farmer Abner Meecham in the independent film That Evening Sun. He also portrayed Francis Preston Blair in Steven Spielberg's Lincoln (2012).

In 2003, Holbrook was honored with the National Humanities Medal by President George W. Bush.

== Early life and education ==
Harold Rowe Holbrook Jr. was born on February 17, 1925, in Cleveland, Ohio, the son of Aileen (née Davenport) Holbrook (1905–1987), a vaudeville dancer, and Harold Rowe Holbrook Sr. (1902–1982).

Holbrook and his two elder sisters were abandoned by their parents when he was two years old. The three children were raised by their paternal grandparents, first in Weymouth, Massachusetts, and later in the Cleveland suburb of Lakewood, Ohio. He graduated from Culver Military Academy (now part of the Culver Academies) and then from Denison University, where an honors project about Mark Twain led him to develop the one-man show for which he became best known, a series of performances titled Mark Twain Tonight!. He also studied acting at HB Studio in New York City.

From 1942 through 1946, Holbrook served in the United States Army in World War II, achieving the rank of staff sergeant; he was stationed in Newfoundland, where he performed in theater productions such as the play Lady Precious Stream.

== Career ==
=== Mark Twain Tonight! ===
Holbrook's first solo performance as Twain was at Lock Haven State Teachers College in Pennsylvania in 1954. Ed Sullivan saw him and gave 30-year-old Holbrook his first national exposure on The Ed Sullivan Show on February 12, 1956, five days before his 31st birthday. Holbrook was also a member of the Valley Players (1941–1962), a summer-stock theater company based in Holyoke, Massachusetts, which performed at Mountain Park Casino Playhouse at Mountain Park. He joined The Lambs Club in 1955, where he began developing his one-man show. He was a member of the cast for several years and performed Mark Twain Tonight! as the 1957 season opener. The State Department even sent him on a European tour, which included pioneering appearances behind the Iron Curtain.

In 1959, Holbrook first played the role off-Broadway. Columbia Records recorded an LP of excerpts from the show.

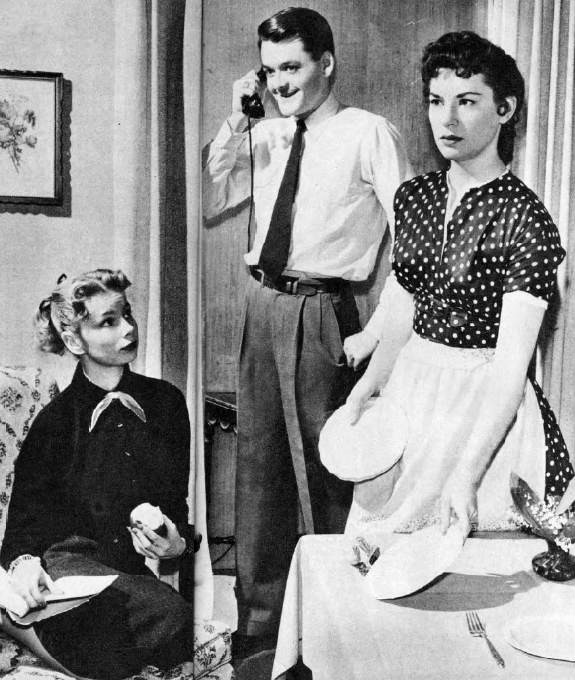
Holbrook in The Brighter Day Scene, August 1954

Holbrook performed in a special production for the 1964/1965 New York World's Fair for the Bell Telephone Pavilion. Jo Mielziner created an innovative audio-visual ride experience and used Holbrook's acting talents on 65 different action screens for "The Ride of Communications" with the movie itself known as From Drumbeats to Telstar.

In 1967, Mark Twain Tonight! was presented on television by CBS and Xerox, and Holbrook received an Emmy for his performance. Holbrook's Twain first played on Broadway in 1966, and again in 1977 and 2005; Holbrook was 80 years of age during his final Broadway run, older (for the first time) than the character he was portraying. Holbrook won a Tony Award for the performance in 1966. Until he retired in 2017, aged 92, Mark Twain Tonight! toured the country, which amounted to over 2,100 performances. This included one of his first performances in the spring of 1962, when he was 37, and one of his last in September 2014 (when he was 89), at his high-school alma mater in Indiana.

=== Success ===
In 1964, Holbrook played the role of the Major in the original production of Arthur Miller's Incident at Vichy. In 1968, he was one of the replacements for Richard Kiley in the original Broadway production of Man of La Mancha, although he had limited singing ability. In 1966, Holbrook starred opposite Shirley Booth in the acclaimed CBS Playhouse production of The Glass Menagerie.

Holbrook co-starred with Martin Sheen in the controversial and acclaimed 1972 television film That Certain Summer. Around that same year, Holbrook appeared in a television public service announcement (PSA) commissioned by the Ad Council; aimed at the parents of college students planning to study abroad, the PSA sees Holbrook in a jail cell, warning viewers to inform their children of the penalties for drug abuse in countries outside the US. In 1973, Holbrook appeared as Lieutenant Neil Briggs, the boss and rival of Detective "Dirty" Harry Callahan (Clint Eastwood) in Magnum Force, an "obsessively neat and prim fanatic" who supports the obliteration of San Francisco's criminals and who is the leader of a rogue group of vigilante officers.

In 1976, Holbrook won acclaim for his portrayal of the sixteenth U.S. President Abraham Lincoln in a series of television specials based on Carl Sandburg's acclaimed biography. He won a Primetime Emmy Award for Outstanding Lead Actor in a Drama Series for the 1970 series The Bold Ones: The Senator. He was also famous for his role as the enigmatic Deep Throat (whose identity was unknown at the time) in the film All the President's Men, and Commander Joseph Rochefort in the World War II battle film Midway. In 1977, he starred in the World War II film Julia, and the British-American thriller film Capricorn One.

In 1979, Holbrook starred with Katharine Ross, Barry Bostwick, and Richard Anderson in the made-for-TV movie Murder by Natural Causes. He appeared in various mini-series, including as the second U.S. President John Adams in George Washington (1984), North and South (1985/1986) and Dress Gray (1986), and continued performing in theatrical productions, such as King Lear. Holbrook was the narrator on the Ken Burns documentary Lewis & Clark: The Journey of the Corps of Discovery in 1997.

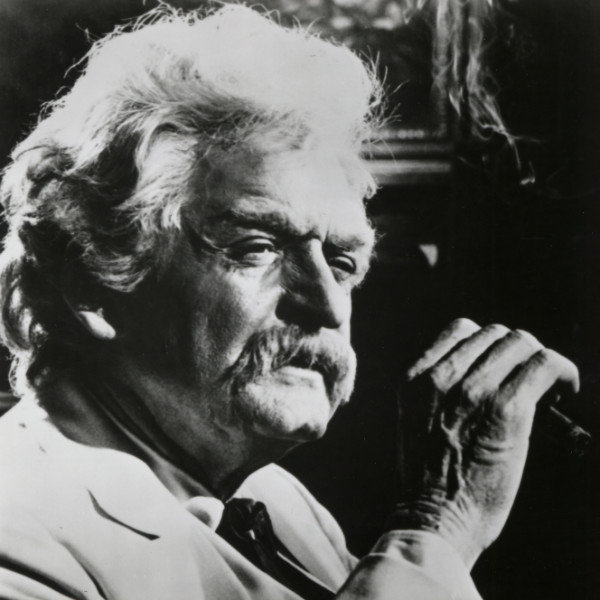
Holbrook performing as Twain at the University of Houston

From 1986 to 1989, Holbrook had a recurring role as Reese Watson on Designing Women, opposite his wife Dixie Carter. Over a short period between 1988 and 1990, Holbrook directed four episodes of the series. Holbrook also had a major role on the sitcom Evening Shade throughout its entire run. Early on in his career, Holbrook worked onstage and in a television soap opera, The Brighter Day.

Holbrook's film roles during the 1980s and 1990s include a priest in The Fog (1980), a professor in Creepshow (1982), senior stock broker in Wall Street (1987), a neighborly lawyer in Fletch Lives (1989), senior partner of a corrupt law firm in The Firm (1993), and the voice of Amphitryon, the adoptive father of Hercules, in the Disney animated film Hercules (1997).

In 1999, Holbrook was inducted into the American Theatre Hall of Fame. A year later, Holbrook appeared in Men of Honor, where he portrayed a racist and hypocritical officer who endlessly tries to fail an African-American diver trainee. Holbrook played the role of Albie Duncan in two episodes of The West Wing.

He appeared as the host in the documentary The Seventh Day: Revelations From The Lost Pages of History (2005).

=== Later career ===
He appeared in Sean Penn's critically acclaimed film Into the Wild (2007) and received an Oscar nomination for Best Performance by an Actor in a Supporting Role at the 80th Academy Awards. At the time, this rendered Holbrook, at age 82, the oldest nominee in Academy Award history in the Best Supporting Actor category. Holbrook was nominated for a Screen Actors Guild Award for his work in the film. From late August through mid-September 2007, he starred as the narrator in the Hartford Stage production of Thornton Wilder's Our Town, a role he had once played on television.

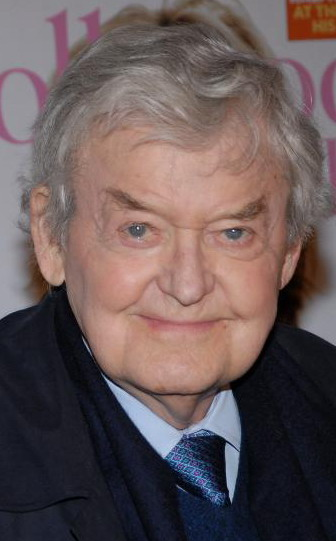
Holbrook in 2007

Holbrook appeared with wife Dixie Carter in That Evening Sun, filmed in East Tennessee in the summer of 2008, when he was 83. The film, produced by Dogwood Entertainment, is based on a short story by William Gay. That Evening Sun premiered in March 2009 (when Holbrook was 84) at South By Southwest, where it received the Audience Award for Narrative Feature and a special Jury Prize for Ensemble Cast. Joe Leydon of Variety hailed Hollbrook's performance in the film as a "career-highlight star turn as an irascible octogenarian farmer who will not go gentle into that good night". That Evening Sun also was screened at the 2009 Nashville Film Festival, where Holbrook was honored with a special Lifetime Achievement Award, and the film itself received another Audience Award.

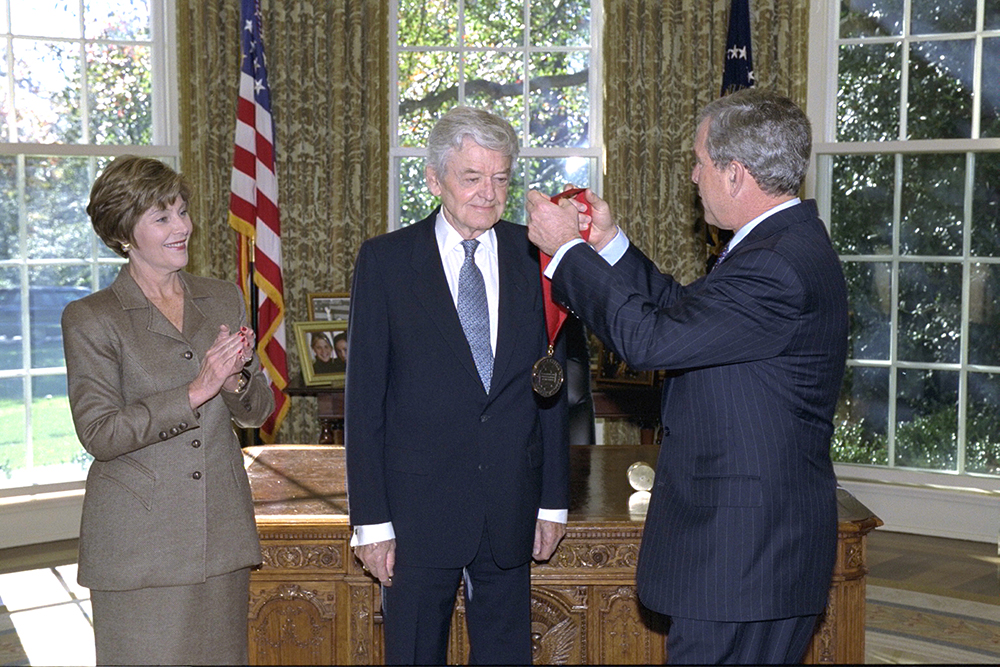
President George W. Bush awarding Holbrook with the National Humanities Medal in the Oval Office in November 2003 alongside First Lady Laura Bush

Holbrook appeared as a featured guest star in a 2006 episode of the HBO series The Sopranos and the NCIS episode "Escaped". On April 22, 2010, aged 85, Holbrook signed on to portray Katey Sagal's character's father on the FX original series Sons of Anarchy for a four-episode arc in their third season, as well as appearing in additional fifth episode in the final season. He also had a multiple-episode arc on The Event, an American television series on NBC, appearing in the 2010–2011 season.

In 2011, Holbrook appeared in Water for Elephants. In 2012, Steven Spielberg cast Holbrook to play Francis Preston Blair in Lincoln. His subsequent film roles were in Gus Van Sant's Promised Land (2012), the voice of Mayday the fire engine in the animated Disney film Planes: Fire & Rescue (2014), and in the minor role as Whizzer in the drama film Blackway (2016). In 2014, Holbrook was the subject of Scott Teems' documentary Holbrook/Twain: An American Odyssey depicting Holbrook's long-lasting career portraying Twain. It was premiered at the Los Angeles Film Festival that same year.

In 2016, Holbrook was cast as Red Hudmore and appeared in the final season of Bones on January 17, 2017. On March 23, 2017, he appeared on an episode on Grey's Anatomy playing a retired thoracic surgeon whose wife is a patient, and on Hawaii Five-0 later in the year.

In September 2017, after six decades of playing the role of Mark Twain, Holbrook, then 92, announced his retirement from Mark Twain Tonight! Holbrook indicated that he would like to continue working on movies and television.

== Personal life ==
Holbrook was married three times and had three children. He married a Newfoundlander, Ruby Elaine Johnston, in 1945 and they had two children. They divorced in 1965. In 1966, he married Carol Eve Rossen. They had one child and they divorced in 1983.

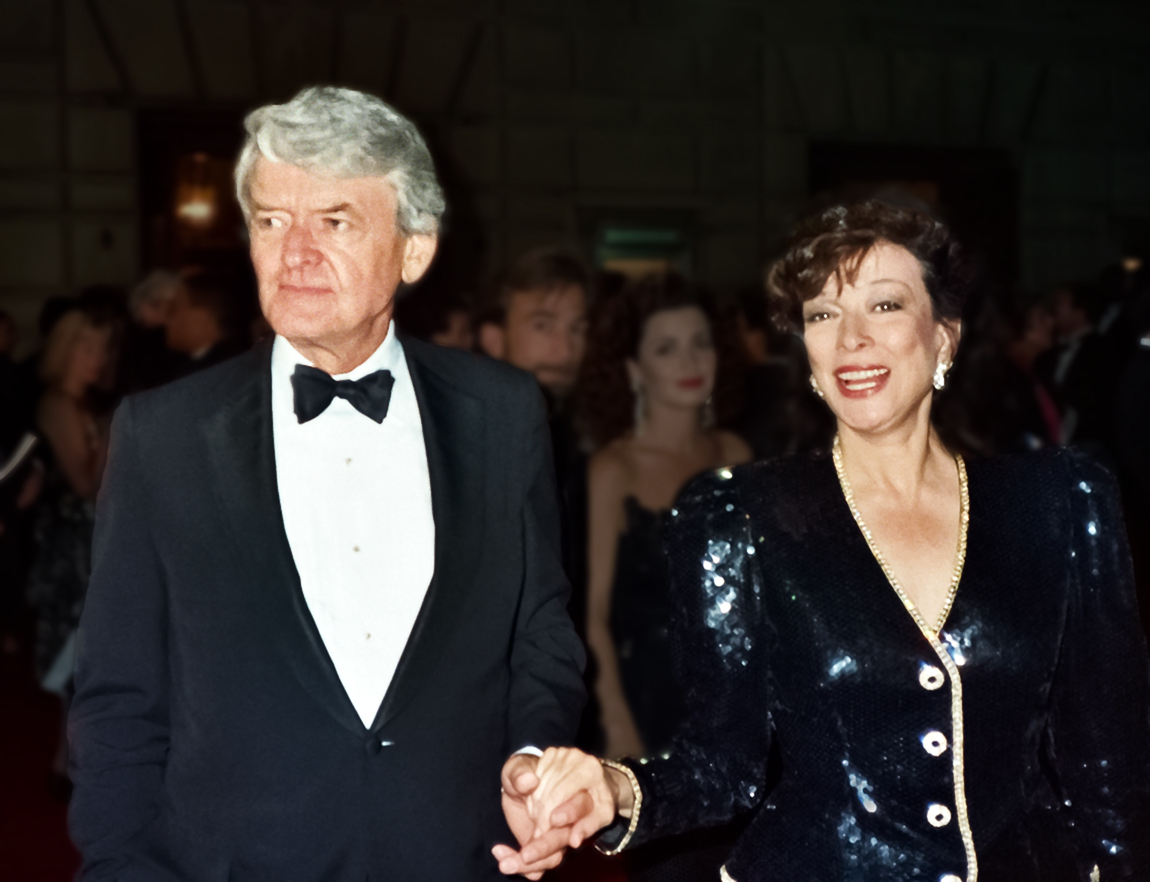
Holbrook, 64 and Carter, 50 at the 41st Primetime Emmy Awards, September 17, 1989

Holbrook married actress and singer Dixie Carter in 1984 and the couple remained married until Carter's death from endometrial cancer on April 10, 2010. Holbrook appeared as a recurring character on Carter's TV series, Designing Women.

Holbrook said of his home in McLemoresville, Tennessee, that it had the "feel" of the Mark Twain House in Hartford, Connecticut, and that there was no other place to which he felt so ideally suited. He also had a residence in Beverly Hills, California. Holbrook had a recurring role on his wife's hit sitcom Designing Women, appearing in nine episodes between 1986 and 1989 as Carter's on-screen significant other. In 2011, Holbrook's memoir, Harold: The Boy Who Became Mark Twain, was published by Farrar, Straus and Giroux.

In October 2016, aged 91, Holbrook wrote a letter to The New York Times defending actor director Nate Parker over his alleged 1999 rape of a woman and Parker's controversial film The Birth of a Nation. He urged others to "move on" from Parker's past and to view the film, which was "an exceptional piece of artistry and a vital portrait of our American experience".

=== Political views ===
Holbrook occasionally criticized the politicization of religion. He was a registered independent, but leaned towards the liberal end of the U.S. political spectrum. He criticized the Republican Party while Barack Obama was in office.

In 2016, he castigated then-Republican candidate Donald Trump for not having "the maturity to run the country". Holbrook praised Senator Bernie Sanders for his honesty and called him an exception to politicians "say[ing] what they think might get them elected".

== Death ==
Holbrook died at his home in Beverly Hills on January 23, 2021, at age 95; no cause was made public. He was buried in McLemoresville Cemetery in McLemoresville, Tennessee, alongside his wife, Dixie Carter.

== Legacy ==
In 2003, President George W. Bush honored Holbrook with a National Humanities Medal for "charming audiences with the wit and wisdom of Mark Twain as Twain's outlook never fails to give Holbrook a good show to put on".

The local community of McLemoresville, hometown of his wife Dixie Carter, constructed the Dixie Theatre for Performing Arts in nearby Huntingdon, Tennessee, which features the Hal Holbrook Auditorium. Upon his retirement from his Mark Twain persona, the HuffPost wrote that Holbrook was "the man who has done more to keep Mark Twain on people's minds than anyone else".

== Awards and nominations ==
Year	Title	Accolade	Results	Ref
1959	Mark Twain Tonight!	Vernon Rice Award for Outstanding Performance (shared with Jane McArthur)	Won	
1959	Mark Twain Tonight!	Obie Award	Special Citation	
1959	Mark Twain Tonight!	Outer Critics Circle Award	Special Citation	
1966	Mark Twain Tonight!	Tony Award for Best Actor in a Play	Won	
1967	Mark Twain Tonight!	Primetime Emmy Award for Outstanding Single Performance by an Actor in a Leading Role in a Drama	Nominated	
1969	The Bold Ones: The Lawyers – (Pilot Episode: "The Whole World Is Watching")	Primetime Emmy Award for Outstanding Single Performance by an Actor in a Supporting Role	Nominated	
1971	The Bold Ones: The Senator – (Pilot Episode: "A Clear and Present Danger")	Primetime Emmy Award for Outstanding Single Performance by an Actor in a Leading Role	Nominated	
1971	The Bold Ones: The Senator	Primetime Emmy Award for Outstanding Continued Performance by an Actor in a Leading Role in a Dramatic Series	Won	
1973	That Certain Summer	Primetime Emmy Award for Outstanding Single Performance by an Actor in a Leading Role	Nominated	
1974	Pueblo	Primetime Emmy Award for Best Lead Actor in a Drama	Won	
1974	Pueblo	Primetime Emmy Award for Actor of the Year (Special Award)	Won	
1976	Sandburg's Lincoln	Primetime Emmy Award for Outstanding Lead Actor in a Limited Series	Won	
1978	The Awakening Land	Primetime Emmy Award for Outstanding Lead Actor in a Limited Series	Nominated	
1978	Our Town	Primetime Emmy Award for Outstanding Lead Actor in a Drama or Comedy Special	Nominated	
1988	Portrait of America – (Episode: "New York City")	Primetime Emmy Award for Outstanding Individual Achievement in Informational Programming	Nominated	
1989	Portrait of America – (Episode: "Alaska")	Primetime Emmy Award for Outstanding Individual Achievement in Informational Programming	Won	
2003	National Humanities Medal	Presented by President George W. Bush	Awarded	
2007	Into the Wild	Chicago Film Critics Association Award for Best Supporting Actor	Nominated	
2008	Into the Wild	Academy Award for Best Supporting Actor	Nominated	
2008	Into the Wild	Critics' Choice Movie Award for Best Supporting Actor	Nominated	
2008	Into the Wild	Online Film Critics Society Award for Best Supporting Actor	Nominated	
2008	Into the Wild	Actor Award for Outstanding Performance by a Male Actor in a Supporting Role	Nominated	
