= Walton Goggins =

American actor (born 1971)

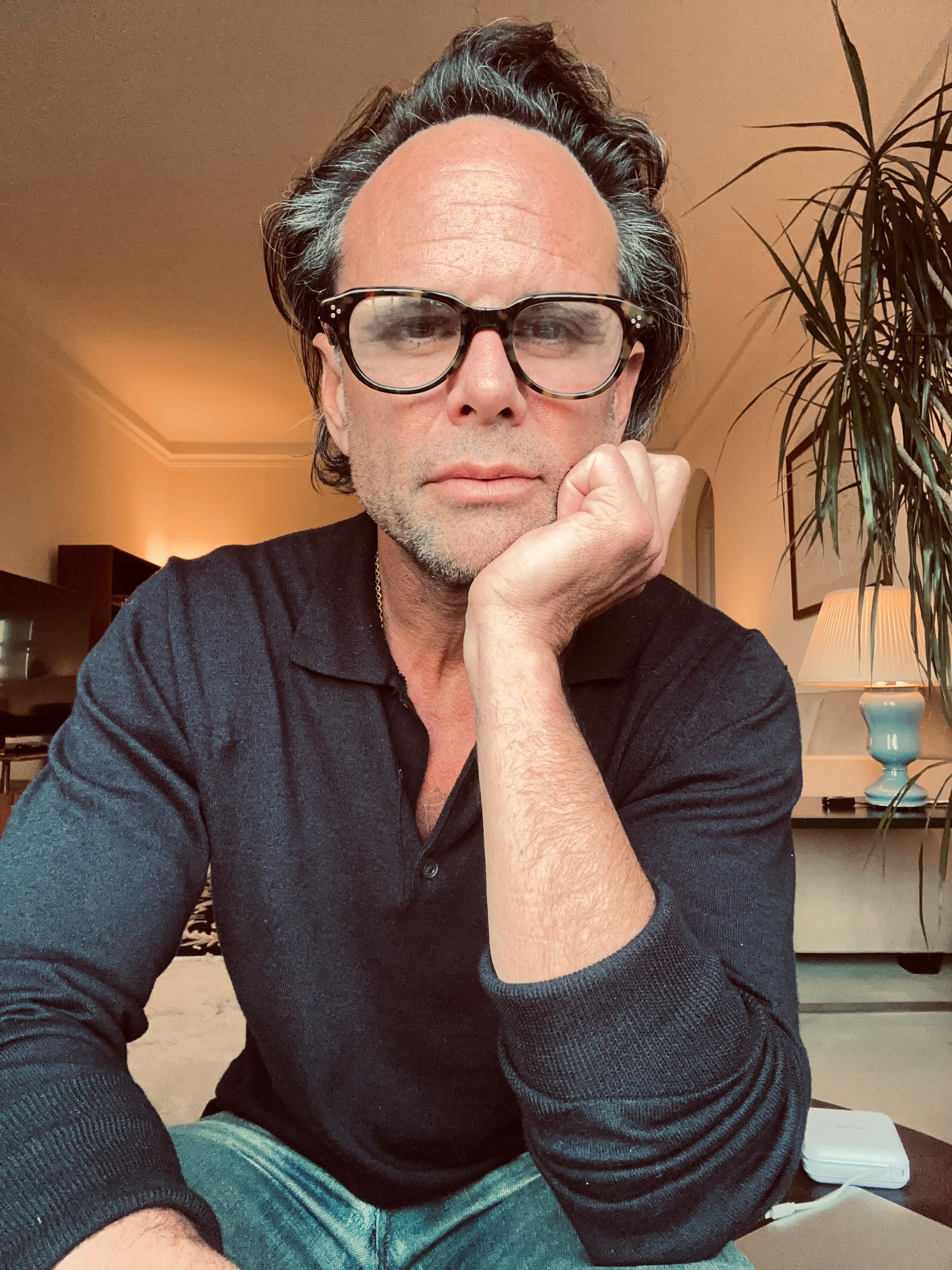
- Goggins in 2025
- Born: Walton Sanders Goggins Jr. November 10, 1971 (age 55); Birmingham, Alabama, U.S.
- Occupation: Actor
- Years active: 1989–present
- Spouses: Leanne Kaun (m. 2001; died 2004); Nadia Conners (m. 2011)
- Children: 1

Walton Sanders Goggins Jr. (born November 10, 1971) is an American actor. He has starred in various television series, including The Shield (2002–2008), Justified (2010–2015), Vice Principals (2016–2017), The Righteous Gemstones (2019–2025), Invincible (2021–present), Fallout (2024–present), and The White Lotus (2025). He was nominated for the Primetime Emmy Award for Outstanding Supporting Actor in a Drama Series for Justified and The White Lotus, and for the Primetime Emmy Award for Outstanding Lead Actor in a Drama Series for Fallout.

Goggins starred in and co-produced the Academy Award–winning short film The Accountant (2001). He has also had significant roles in feature films, such as Predators (2010), The Hateful Eight (2015), Tomb Raider (2018), Ant-Man and the Wasp (2018), and Fatman (2020) among others.

== Early life ==
Goggins was born on November 10, 1971, in Birmingham, Alabama, the son of Janet Long and Walton Goggins Sr. He was raised in Lithia Springs, Georgia, a suburb of Atlanta. He attended and graduated from Lithia Springs High School, and then attended Georgia Southern University for a year. He has stated that a DNA test identified him as a descendant of the Irish high king Niall of the Nine Hostages.

As he has described in interviews, a young Goggins twice had two front teeth knocked out: first, as a fifth-grader at sports practice in 1979, when he was accidentally struck in the mouth by a baseball, and after their successful reinsertion, a year and a half later he knocked them out again after hitting his face diving into a pool's shallow end. He then spent his high school years wearing a removable dental bridge (something he says he used to comic effect).

== Career ==
Goggins moved to Los Angeles at nineteen, working at LA Fitness and a valet parking business while taking acting classes and auditioning. After starring in a few roles in Georgia, he met Ray McKinnon while filming Murder in Mississippi.

Goggins played Shane Vendrell in the FX drama series The Shield. He formed the production company Ginny Mule Pictures, which produced four films: The Accountant (a short film which won an Academy Award for Live Action Short Film), Chrystal (Sundance Dramatic Competition), Randy and the Mob, and That Evening Sun (which won the South by Southwest Special Jury Prize). They later created the drama series Rectify. Goggins was set to play the lead and AMC had bought the pilot script, written by McKinnon, a role which went to Aden Young, when the series later went to Sundance TV.

Goggins had a major supporting role as a deadly death row inmate being hunted by the titular antagonists in the film Predators. He played Boyd Crowder in the pilot episode for the FX drama series Justified. Before Goggins was cast, Boyd was intended to die in the pilot episode, but Graham Yost kept the character when the character scored highly with test audiences. Goggins joined the main cast for the second season in May 2010. He was nominated for a Primetime Emmy Award for Outstanding Supporting Actor in a Drama Series for his role on Justified. In 2011, he appeared in "Code of the West", a commercial for Ram Truck's "Guts & Glory" campaign. He appeared in Cowboys & Aliens as Hunt, a bandit formerly in the employ of the protagonist. He played a sadistic overseer and slave fighting trainer in the western film Django Unchained.

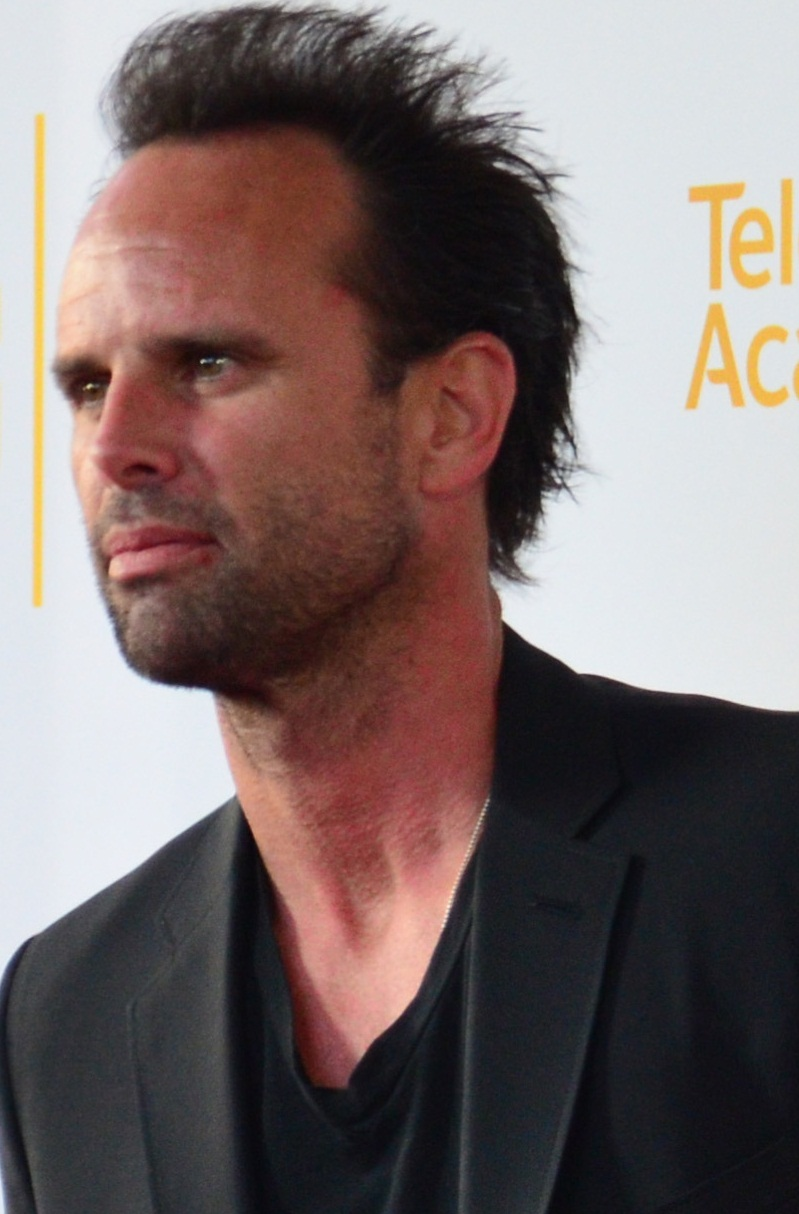
Goggins in 2014

Goggins played a transgender sex worker in the FX drama series Sons of Anarchy. He previously worked with the show's creator, Kurt Sutter, when the latter was a writer and executive producer on The Shield. The name "Venus Van Dam" is a play on the undercover name "Cletus Van Damme" used by The Shield character Shane Vendrell. He played Chris Mannix in The Hateful Eight and Lee Russell in the HBO dark comedy series Vice Principals. The New York Times critic Mike Hale wrote, "Walton Goggins makes a habit of being the best thing about the television shows he's in."

In 2018, Goggins played Lawrence in Maze Runner: The Death Cure, Mathias Vogel in Tomb Raider, and Sonny Burch in Ant-Man and the Wasp. That same year, he made a guest appearance in the CBS sitcom The Big Bang Theory as a jealous husband. In 2019, he played the lead character in the CBS sitcom The Unicorn and starred in the comedy series The Righteous Gemstones, alongside Vice Principals costar Danny McBride. In 2020, Goggins voiced part of the true crime podcast Deep Cover: The Drug Wars.

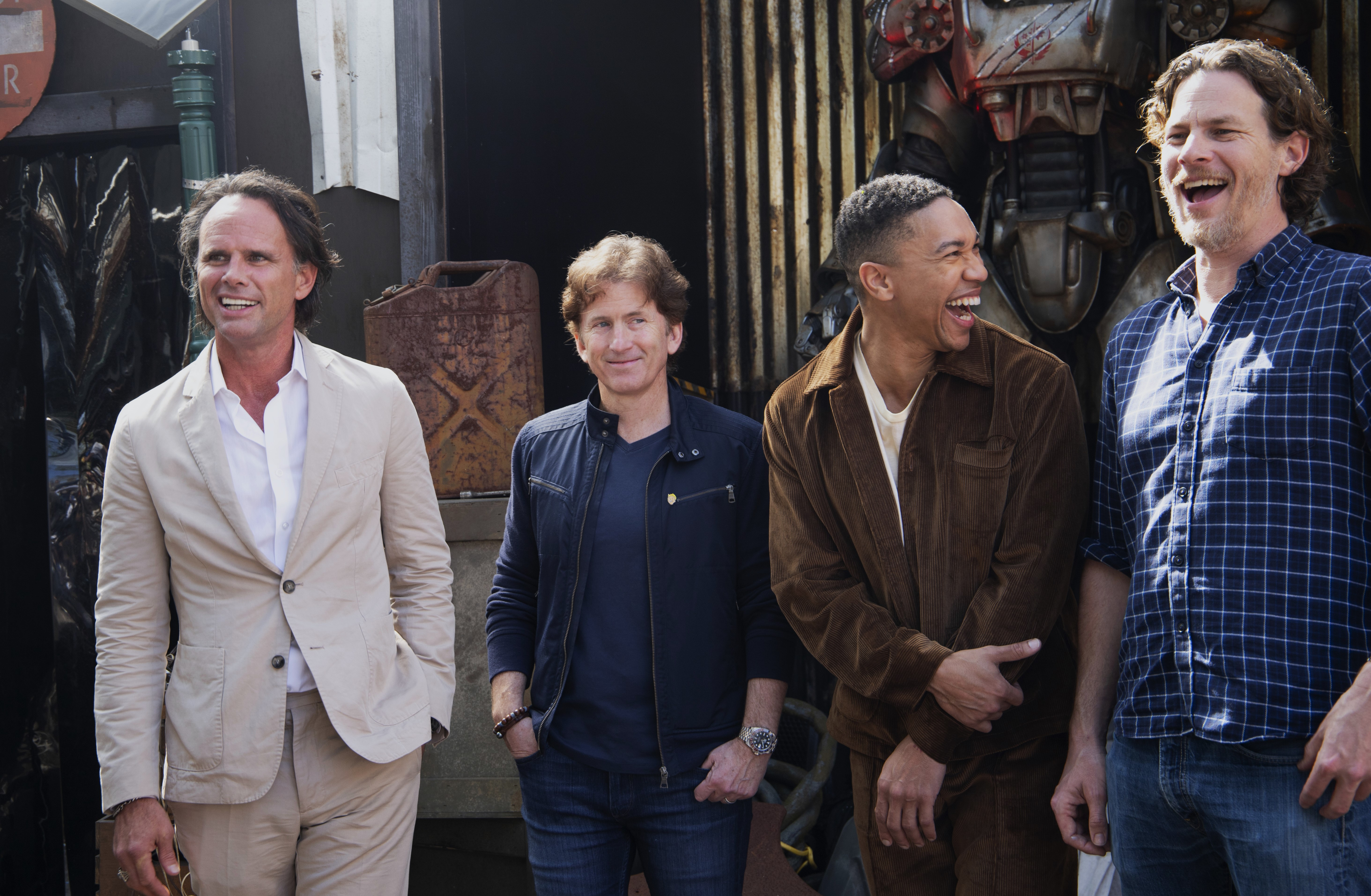
Goggins (left) with fellow collaborators on Fallout during SXSW 2024

Goggins was cast as Jay Whittle / The Hero in the Amazon Prime Video comedy miniseries I'm a Virgo. In 2024, he played Cooper Howard / The Ghoul in the Amazon Prime Video drama series Fallout, and Peter Tomarken in The Luckiest Man in America, based on an actual incident involving a contestant on the Tomarken-hosted game show Press Your Luck.

The actor designed a series of active eyewear which he promoted in a co-branded commercial with GoDaddy that aired during Super Bowl LIX in 2025. This was his first appearance in a Super Bowl commercial.

Goggins joined the ensemble cast for the third season of the anthology series The White Lotus.

=== Advertising ===
Goggins has been prolific in appearing in television commercials across his career, including for Walmart and, in a Super Bowl ad spot, promoting GoDaddy and his own goggle glasses line. Regarding commercial acting, Goggins told People: "When we did the Super Bowl commercial for Walton Goggins Goggle Glasses, what I found so rewarding was being given the opportunity to step into this space and embrace the challenge and the creativity of telling a story in 15 seconds, 30 seconds or in 60 seconds." Goggins said that, before working more seriously in advertising, he received advice on this area of work from Samuel L. Jackson.

== Personal life ==
In 2001, Goggins married Leanne Knight. Although estranged, they remained married until she died by suicide on November 12, 2004. Goggins married filmmaker Nadia Conners in August 2011 and they have a son together, born the same year.

== Filmography ==
Key
†	Denotes films that have not yet been released

=== Film ===
Year	Title	Role	Notes
1992	Mr. Saturday Night	Shaky Kid	Uncredited
1992	Forever Young	Gate MP	
1994	The Next Karate Kid	Charlie	
1997	The Apostle	Sam	
1997	Switchback	Bud	
1998	Major League: Back to the Minors	Billy "Downtown" Anderson	
1999	Wayward Son	Plantation Owner	
2000	Red Dirt	Lee Todd	
2000	Shanghai Noon	Wallace	
2000	The Crow: Salvation	Det. Stan Roberts	
2001	The Accountant	Tommy O'Dell	Short film; also co-producer
2001	Daddy and Them	Tommy Christian	
2001	Joy Ride	Cop	Uncredited
2002	The Bourne Identity	Research Tech	
2003	House of 1000 Corpses	Steve Naish	
2003	Apple Jack	Moe Danyou	Short film
2004	Chrystal	Larry	Also producer
2005	The World's Fastest Indian	Marty	
2006	The Architect	Joe	
2007	Randy and the Mob	Tino Armani	Also producer
2008	Winged Creatures	Zack	
2008	Miracle at St. Anna	Captain Nokes	
2009	That Evening Sun	Paul Meecham	Also producer
2009	Damage	Reno Paulsait	
2010	Predators	Stans	
2011	Cowboys & Aliens	Hunt	
2011	Straw Dogs	Daniel Niles	
2012	Lincoln	Clay Hawkins	
2012	Django Unchained	Billy Crash	
2013	Officer Down	Det. Nick Logue / Angel	
2013	G.I. Joe: Retaliation	Warden Nigel James	
2013	Machete Kills	El Camaleón 1	
2015	Mojave	Jim	
2015	American Ultra	Laugher	
2015	Diablo	Ezra	
2015	The Hateful Eight	Captain Chris Mannix	
2017	Three Christs	Leon	
2018	Maze Runner: The Death Cure	Lawrence	
2018	Tomb Raider	Mathias Vogel	
2018	Ant-Man and the Wasp	Sonny Burch	
2019	Them That Follow	Lemuel	
2019	Once Upon a Time in Hollywood	Old Chattanooga Beer	Voice role cameo; extended cut
2020	Words on Bathroom Walls	Paul	
2020	John Bronco	John Bronco	Short film
2020	Fatman	Skinny Man	
2021	Spirit Untamed	Hendricks	Voice role
2021	John Bronco Rides Again	John Bronco	Short film
2022	Dreamin' Wild	Joe Emerson	
2024	The Uninvited	Sammy	
2024	The Luckiest Man in America	Peter Tomarken	
2024	Queen of the Ring	Jack Pfefer	
2026	Hexed †	Beef Roger Crumbchuck	Voice role
2027	Mister †	TBA	Filming
2028	Miami Vice '85 †	TBA	Filming
TBA	Painter †	TBA	Post-production

=== Television ===
Year	Title	Role	Notes
1989–1992	In the Heat of the Night	Football Teammate / Darrell / Robbie Jeffries / Garth Warkins	4 episodes
1990	Murder in Mississippi	Lyle	TV movie
1992	Beverly Hills, 90210	Mike Muchin	Episode: "The Pit and the Pendulum"
1992	Stay the Night	Wayne Seagrove	TV movie
1993	I'll Fly Away	Langley	Episode: "What's in a Name?"
1993	Queen	Young Man #1	Episode: "Part I"
1993	Renegade	Lance McBride	Episode: "Wheel Man"
1995	JAG	Communications Officer	Episode: "Desert Son"
1996	High Tide	Bad Guy / Treasure Hunter	Episode: "A Three Hour Tour"
1996	Pacific Blue	Harv	Episode: "Captive Audience"
1996	Humanoids from the Deep	Rod	TV movie
1996	The Sentinel	Mick	Episode: "True Crime"
1996	The Cherokee Kid	Jim Bob / Carver Gang	TV movie
1998	NYPD Blue	Terry	Episode: "Honeymoon at Viagra Falls"
2000	Beyond the Prairie: The True Story of Laura Ingalls Wilder	Almanzo Wilder	TV movie
2001	Murder, She Wrote: The Last Free Man	Billy Weber	TV movie
2002	Beyond the Prairie, Part 2: The True Story of Laura Ingalls Wilder	Almanzo Wilder	TV movie
2002–2008	The Shield	Shane Vendrell	Main cast
2004	Hawaii	Agent Davis	Episode: "Lost and Found"
2007	CSI: Crime Scene Investigation	Marlon Frost	Episode: "Empty Eyes"
2009	Criminal Minds	John Cooley	Episode: "Demonology"
2009	CSI: Miami	Sean Echols	Episode: "Dissolved"
2010–2015	Justified	Boyd Crowder	Recurring role (season 1), main cast (seasons 2–6)
2012	Unsupervised	Bruce Lindsay	Voice role; episode: "The Magic of Science"
2012–2014	Sons of Anarchy	Venus Van Dam	Recurring role (seasons 5–7)
2014	Community	Mr. Stone	Episode: "Cooperative Polygraphy"
2016–2017	Vice Principals	Lee Russell	Main cast
2017	American Dad!	Enoch	Voice role; episode: "A Nice Night for a Drive"
2017–2018	Six	Richard "Rip" Taggart	Main cast (season 2)
2018	L.A. Confidential	Detective Jack Vincennes	Unsold pilot
2018	The Big Bang Theory	Oliver	Episode: "The Separation Triangulation"
2019	Deep State	Nathan Miller	Main cast (series 2); also executive producer
2019–2025	The Righteous Gemstones	Baby Billy Freeman	Main cast (season 1), recurring role (seasons 2–4)
2019–2021	The Unicorn	Wade Felton	Main cast; also producer
2021	Squidbillies	Bubba	Voice role; episode: "Let'er R.I.P."
2021–present	Invincible	Cecil Stedman	Recurring role, voice role
2022	The Last Days of Ptolemy Grey	Dr. Rubin	Miniseries; 5 episodes
2022–2023	George & Tammy	Earl "Peanutt" Montgomery	Miniseries; 6 episodes
2023	I'm a Virgo	Jay Whittle / The Hero	Miniseries, 5 episodes
2023	Justified: City Primeval	Boyd Crowder	Episode: "The Question"
2024–present	Fallout	Cooper Howard / The Ghoul	Main cast
2024	What If...?	Sonny Burch	Voice; episode: "What If... 1872?"
2025	The White Lotus	Rick Hatchett	Main cast (season 3)
2025	Saturday Night Live	Himself (host)	Episode: "Walton Goggins/Arcade Fire"
2026	Saturday Night Live	Himself (Musical Guest Cameo)	Episode "Druski/The Strokes"

=== Video games ===
Year	Title	Voice role
1995	Wing Commander IV: The Price of Freedom	Border World Pilot
2007	The Shield	Det. Shane Vendrell
2017	Prey	Aaron Ingram
2025	Fallout 76	Cooper Howard / The Ghoul

=== Music videos ===
Year	Artist	Title	Director
2026	The Strokes	"Going Shopping”	Johann Rashid

== Awards and nominations ==
Organizations	Year	Category	Work	Result	Ref.
Actor Awards	2026	Outstanding Performance by a Male Actor in a Drama Series	The White Lotus	Nominated	
Actor Awards	2026	Outstanding Performance by an Ensemble in a Drama Series	The White Lotus	Nominated	
Astra TV Awards	2024	Best Actor in a Streaming Drama Series	Fallout	Nominated	
Critics' Choice Movie Awards	2015	Best Acting Ensemble	The Hateful Eight	Nominated	
Critics' Choice Television Awards	2011	Best Supporting Actor in a Drama Series	Justified	Nominated	
Critics' Choice Television Awards	2013	Best Supporting Actor in a Drama Series	Justified	Nominated	
Critics' Choice Television Awards	2014	Best Supporting Actor in a Drama Series	Justified	Nominated	
Critics' Choice Television Awards	2014	Best Guest Performer in a Drama Series	Sons of Anarchy	Nominated	
Critics' Choice Television Awards	2015	Best Supporting Actor in a Drama Series	Justified	Nominated	
Critics' Choice Television Awards	2015	Best Guest Performer in a Drama Series	Sons of Anarchy	Nominated	
Critics' Choice Television Awards	2018	Best Supporting Actor in a Comedy Series	Vice Principals	Won	
Critics' Choice Television Awards	2019	Best Actor in a Comedy Series	The Unicorn	Nominated	
Critics' Choice Super Awards	2025	Best Actor in a Superhero Series	Fallout	Nominated	
Critics' Choice Super Awards	2026	Best Actor in a Superhero Series	Fallout	Nominated	
Gotham TV Awards	2024	Outstanding Performance in a Drama Series	Fallout	Nominated	
Golden Globe Awards	2026	Best Supporting Actor on Television	The White Lotus	Nominated	
Hollywood Film Awards	2015	Ensemble	The Hateful Eight	Won	
Hollywood Music in Media Awards	2019	Best Original Song in a TV Show/Limited Series (Note: (shared with Joseph Stephens, Danny McBride, Edi Patterson and Jennifer Nettles))	The Righteous Gemstones	Nominated	
Newport Beach Film Festival	2019	Ensemble Cast	Them That Follow	Won	
Primetime Emmy Awards	2011	Outstanding Supporting Actor in a Drama Series	Justified (episode: "The I of the Storm")	Nominated	
Primetime Emmy Awards	2024	Outstanding Lead Actor in a Drama Series	Fallout (episode: "The Ghouls")	Nominated	
Primetime Emmy Awards	2025	Outstanding Supporting Actor in a Drama Series	The White Lotus (episode: "Amor Fati")	Nominated	
San Diego Film Critics Society	2012	Best Ensemble Performance	Django Unchained	Nominated	
Satellite Awards	2011	Best Supporting Actor –Television	Justified	Nominated	
Satellite Awards	2019	Best Supporting Actor – Television	The Righteous Gemstones	Nominated	
Satellite Awards	2023	Best Supporting Actor – Television	The Righteous Gemstones	Nominated	
Saturn Awards	2016	Best Supporting Actor	The Hateful Eight	Nominated	
Slamdance Film Festival	2001	Spirit of Slamdance (Note: (shared with Ray McKinnon and Lisa Blount))	The Accountant	Won	
SXSW Film Festival	2009	Best Ensemble Cast	That Evening Sun	Won	
TCA Awards	2009	Individual Achievement in Drama	The Shield	Nominated	
