= Scott Teems =

American director and screenwriter

- Occupations: Film director; screenwriter; producer
- Years active: 2009–present

Scott Teems is an American filmmaker best known for his work on That Evening Sun (2009), The Quarry (2020), Halloween Kills (2021), Firestarter (2022) and Insidious: The Red Door (2023).

== Career ==
In 2009, Teems started his career by directing and writing the drama film That Evening Sun. In February 2012, Teems signed on to script a film version of Cutting for Stone. In October 2012, he was attached to script Scott Derrickson's horror film The Breathing Method, based on Stephen King's novella of the same name. In 2014, he wrote and directed the documentary film Holbrook/Twain: An American Odyssey. By 2016, he scripted six episodes for the drama series Rectify, directing two of them.

In November 2018, he drafted the script for an episode of Narcos: Mexico. In 2020, he directed the mystery thriller film The Quarry, from a screenplay he wrote alongside Andrew Brotzman. He wrote the script and story for horror sequel Halloween Kills (2021), and also scripted the horror-thriller remake Firestarter, released in 2022.

In July 2019, Teems drafted the story for David Gordon Green's The Exorcist: Believer. In October 2020, he was brought on board to script Insidious: The Red Door.

== Filmography ==
Short film

Year	Title	Director	Writer	Editor	Notes
2004	Root.	Yes	Yes	No	
2006	Le Chase	Yes	No	Yes	Co-directed with Charlie Shahnaian
2007	A Death in the Woods	Yes	Yes	Yes	

Feature film

Year	Title	Director	Writer	Executive Producer	Ref.
2009	That Evening Sun	Yes	Yes	No	
2020	The Quarry	Yes	Yes	No	
2021	Halloween Kills	No	Yes	No	
2022	Firestarter	No	Yes	Yes	
2023	Insidious: The Red Door	No	Yes	No	
2023	The Exorcist: Believer	No	Story	No	

Documentary film

Year	Title	Director	Writer	Executive Producer	Notes
2012	The Network Effect Featuring Dr. Steven Shepard	Yes	No	No	Documentary short
2014	Holbrook/Twain: An American Odyssey	Yes	Yes	Yes	
2018	Interpreting Twain	No	No	Yes	Documentary short

Television

Year	Title	Director	Writer	Executive Producer	Notes	Ref.
2014–16	Rectify	Yes	Yes	Yes	6 episodes	
2018	Narcos: Mexico	No	Yes	Yes	Episode: "Rafa, Rafa, Rafa!"	
2025–present	The Lowdown	Yes	Yes	Yes	4 episodes	

== Accolades ==
For That Evening Sun, he won awards at the 2006 IFP Market Award for "Emerging Narrative Screenplay Award", the 2009 Atlanta Film Festival for "Jury Award for Best Narrative", the 2009 Newport International Film Festival for "Special Narrative Feature Jury Prize" and "Student Jury Narrative Grand Prize", the 2009 Sidewalk Moving Picture Festival for "Best Director", the 2009 Little Rock Film Festival for "Best Narrative Feature Award", the 2009 South by Southwest for "Narrative Feature Audience Award", the 2009 Sarasota Film Festival for "Audience Award for Best Narrative Feature", and the 2009 Memphis Indie Film Festival for "Jury Award for Best Narrative Feature".

For The Exorcist: Believer, he was nominated at the 44th Golden Raspberry Awards for Worst Screenplay.
