= William Gay (author) =

American novelist (1941–2012)

- Born: October 27, 1941; Hohenwald, Tennessee, U.S.
- Died: February 23, 2012 (aged 70); Hohenwald, Tennessee, U.S.
- Occupation: Writer
- Writing career
- Genre: Literature

William Elbert Gay (October 27, 1941 – February 23, 2012) was an American novelist, and author of short stories and essays.

== Early life ==
Gay was born in Hohenwald, Tennessee. After high school, Gay joined the United States Navy and served during the Vietnam War. After returning to the States, he lived in both New York City and Chicago before returning to Lewis County, Tennessee, where he lived from 1978 until his death.

Even though he had been writing since the age of fifteen, Gay did not publish anything until 1998, when two of his short stories were accepted by literary magazines. Before then, Gay made his living as a carpenter, drywall hanger, and house painter.

== Career ==
In 1999, Gay published his first novel, The Long Home. Gay was recognized and marketed as "the real thing," a new Larry Brown.

The novel won the 1999 James A. Michener Memorial Prize and sold well enough to start a bidding war for his second novel. Provinces of Night was published in late 2000 and confirmed Gay's knack for storytelling. It formed the basis for the 2010 independent film Bloodworth. In 2002, Gay published a collection of stories, I Hate to See That Evening Sun Go Down, and in 2006 Gay's third novel, Twilight was published. With its story of a kinky undertaker who hires a hitman to kill a nosy teenager, Twilight is Gay's most straightforward Southern Gothic novel.

Gay's stories have been anthologized extensively, and as well as his fictional work, Gay frequently contributed essays on music to magazines such as Paste and Oxford American.

William Gay was named a 2007 USA Ford Foundation Fellow and awarded a $50,000 grant by United States Artists, a public charity that supports and promotes the work of American artists.

=== Lost works ===
In 2015, it was announced that two of his lost novels had been found and would be published: Little Sister Death was published in the autumn of 2015, and The Lost Country was published in late 2016. In June 2017, the novel Stoneburner was published by Anomolaic Press. On June 30, 2021, his novel Fugitives of the Heart was published by Livingston Press. On July 17, 2022, the final book from the William Gay Archive, Stories from the Attic was published by Dzanc Books.

== Themes ==
Gay's fiction is almost always set in the rural South of the 1940s and 50s. This alone lends it an air of old-fashioned authenticity similar to that of William Faulkner, Thomas Wolfe, and Flannery O'Connor. Gay's South is as darkly violent and as dirt-poor as anything by Erskine Caldwell or O'Connor. Gay's novels take the shape of coming-of-age stories. His three novels depict young idealistic boys that turn into men through a series of violent encounters in which they must make tough moral decisions to face and defeat the evil they are up against. Another recurrent theme in Gay's fiction is his preoccupation with "plain folk," such as carpenters and bootleggers, who are frequently the kin of the young men coming of age. In addition, Provinces of Night deals with another issue peculiar to the Upper South of the period, the condemnation of private property for the development of a new dam by the Tennessee Valley Authority.

== Death ==
Gay died on February 23, 2012, presumably of a heart attack. He was 70.

== Works ==
- 1999: The Long Home – (MacMurray & Beck).
- 2000: Provinces of Night – (Doubleday).
- 2002: I Hate to See That Evening Sun Go Down – (Free Press).
- 2006: Wittgenstein's Lolita/The Iceman: Short Stories from William Gay – (Wild Dog Press).
  - This little collection also includes an afterword by J. M. White that provides the most accurate biographical information on Gay available so far.
- 2006: Twilight – (MacAdam/Cage).
- 2010: Time Done Been Won't Be No More: Collected Prose – (Wild Dog Press).
- 2015: Little Sister Death – published posthumously – (Dzanc Books).
- 2018: Stoneburner – published posthumously – (Anomolaic Press).
- 2018: The Lost Country – published posthumously – (Dzanc Books).
- 2021: Fugitives of the Heart – published posthumously – (Livingston Press).
- 2022: Stories from the Attic – published posthumously – (Dzanc Books).

== Film adaptation of The Long Home ==
It was announced on April 6, 2015, that James Franco would direct, produce—through Rabbit Bandini Productions—and star in the film adaptation of The Long Home. Josh Hutcherson was officially cast as the lead, Nathan Winer on May 1, 2015. Tim Blake Nelson was also officially cast on May 1, 2015. The film was completed and originally slated for release in 2017, but has yet to be released in any form as of 2024.
