= List of adventure films of the 1970s =

A list of adventure films released in the 1970s.

== 1970 ==
Title	Director	Cast	Country	Subgenre/Notes
The Adventurers	Lewis Gilbert	Bekim Fehmiu, Candice Bergen, Ernest Borgnine, Charles Aznavour, Olivia de Havilland, Fernando Rey, Rossano Brazzi	United States	
The Adventures of Gerard	Jerzy Skolimowski	Peter McEnery, Claudia Cardinale, Eli Wallach	United Kingdom; Sweden; Italy	Adventure comedy
The Aquarians	Don McDougall	Ricardo Montalbán, José Ferrer, Leslie Nielsen	United States	Sea adventure
Black Water Gold	Alan Landsburg	Keir Dullea, Bradford Dillman, France Nuyen, Ricardo Montalbán, Lana Wood	United States	Sea adventure
The Bloody Judge	Jesús Franco	Christopher Lee, Maria Schell, Leo Genn, Margaret Lee	Spain; Italy; West Germany; Liechtenstein	Horror adventure
Brancaleone at the Crusades	Mario Monicelli	Vittorio Gassman, Adolfo Celi, Stefania Sandrelli	Italy; Algeria	Adventure comedy
Brother, Cry for Me	William White	Steve Drexel, Leslie Parrish, Larry Pennell	United States	
Carry On Up the Jungle	Gerald Thomas	Frankie Howerd, Sid James, Charles Hawtrey, Joan Sims, Jacki Piper	United Kingdom	Adventure comedy
Compañeros	Sergio Corbucci	Franco Nero, Tomas Milian, Jack Palance, Iris Berben, Fernando Rey	Italy; Spain; West Germany	Western
Il corsaro	Antonio Mollica	Robert Woods	Italy; Spain	Pirate film
Cromwell	Ken Hughes	Richard Harris, Alec Guinness, Robert Morley, Timothy Dalton	United Kingdom	
Deadlock	Roland Klick	Mario Adorf, Anthony Dawson, Marquard Bohm, Mascha Rabben	West Germany	
Donkey Skin	Jacques Demy	Catherine Deneuve, Jean Marais, Jacques Perrin, Micheline Presle, Delphine Seyrig	France	Fantasy adventure, musical
Due bianchi nell'Africa nera	Bruno Corbucci	Franco Franchi, Ciccio Ingrassia	Italy	Adventure comedy
Figures in a Landscape	Joseph Losey	Robert Shaw, Malcolm McDowell	United Kingdom	Adventure drama
La furia dei Khyber	José Luis Merino	Peter Lee Lawrence, Carlos Quiney	Italy; Spain	
The Hawaiians	Tom Gries	Charlton Heston, Tina Chen	United States	
The Invincible Six	Jean Negulesco	Stuart Whitman, Elke Sommer, Curd Jürgens, James Mitchum	United States; Iran	
The Kashmiri Run	John Peyser	Pernell Roberts, Alexandra Bastedo, Julián Mateos	United States; Spain	
Kelly's Heroes	Brian G. Hutton	Clint Eastwood, Telly Savalas, Don Rickles, Donald Sutherland	United States; Yugoslavia	War adventure
The Last Grenade	Gordon Flemyng	Stanley Baker, Alex Cord, Honor Blackman, Richard Attenborough	United Kingdom	War adventure
Lost Flight	Leonard Horn	Lloyd Bridges, Anne Francis, Ralph Meeker	United States	
Il magnifico Robin Hood	Roberto Bianchi Montero	George Martin	Italy	
A Man Called Horse	Elliot Silverstein	Richard Harris	United States	Western
The Mask of Sheba	David Lowell Rich	Walter Pidgeon, Inger Stevens, Eric Braeden, Joseph Wiseman	United States	
The Moonshine War	Richard Quine	Richard Widmark, Alan Alda, Patrick McGoohan	United States	
On the Comet	Karel Zeman	Magdaléna Vášáryová, Emil Horváth	Czechoslovakia	Space adventure, fantasy adventure
Pippi in the South Seas	Olle Hellbom	Inger Nilsson, Martin Ljung, Jarl Borssén	Sweden	Family-oriented adventure, sea adventure
Robin Hood, l'invincibile arciere	José Luis Merino	Carlos Quiney	Italy; Spain	
Satan's Harvest	George Montgomery	George Montgomery, Tippi Hedren, Matt Monro	South Africa	
Skullduggery	Gordon Douglas	Burt Reynolds, Susan Clark, Paul Hubschmid	United States	
Sometimes a Great Notion	Paul Newman	Paul Newman, Henry Fonda, Lee Remick, Michael Sarrazin, Richard Jaeckel	United States	
Start the Revolution Without Me	Bud Yorkin	Gene Wilder, Donald Sutherland	United States	Adventure comedy
Strogoff	Eriprando Visconti	John Phillip Law, Mimsy Farmer, Hiram Keller, Elisabeth Bergner	Italy; France; West Germany	
A Sword for Brando	Alfio Caltabiano	Riccardo Salvino, Karin Schubert	Italy	
Ternos caçadores	Ruy Guerra	Stuart Whitman, Sterling Hayden, Susan Strasberg	Brazil; France; Panama	
The Tigers of Mompracem	Mario Sequi	Ivan Rassimov	Italy	
Tumuc Humac	Jean-Marie Périer	Marc Porel, Dani, François Périer, André Pousse	France	
Viva Cangaceiro	Giovanni Fago	Tomas Milian	Italy; Spain	
Waterloo	Sergei Bondarchuk	Rod Steiger, Christopher Plummer, Orson Welles, Jack Hawkins. Virginia McKenna	Italy; Soviet Union	War adventure
When Dinosaurs Ruled the Earth	Val Guest	Victoria Vetri	United Kingdom	Fantasy adventure
White Sun of the Desert	Vladimir Motyl	Anatoly Kuznetsov, Spartak Mishulin, Kakhi Kavsadze	Soviet Union	War adventure
You Can't Win 'Em All	Peter Collinson	Tony Curtis, Charles Bronson, Michèle Mercier	United Kingdom	

== 1971 ==
Title	Director	Cast	Country	Subgenre/Notes
Bananas	Woody Allen	Woody Allen, Louise Lasser	United States	Adventure comedy
Bedknobs and Broomsticks	Robert Stevenson	Angela Lansbury, David Tomlinson, Roddy McDowall, Sam Jaffe	United Kingdom	Family-oriented adventure, fantasy adventure
Blackie the Pirate	Lorenzo Gicca Palli	Terence Hill, George Martin, Bud Spencer	Italy	Pirate film
Boulevard du Rhum	Robert Enrico	Brigitte Bardot, Lino Ventura	France; Italy; Spain	Sea adventure
The Bridge in the Jungle	Pancho Kohner	John Huston, Katy Jurado, Charles Robinson	United States	
The Butterfly Affair	Jean Herman	Claudia Cardinale, Stanley Baker, Henri Charrière	France; Italy	
Le calde notti di Don Giovanni	Alfonso Brescia	Robert Hoffmann, Barbara Bouchet, Edwige Fenech, Princess Ira von Fürstenberg	Italy; Spain	
Captain Typhoon	Rolf Olsen	Curd Jürgens, Heinz Reincke, Johanna von Koczian	West Germany	Sea adventure
Los corsarios	Ferdinando Baldi	Dean Reed, Alberto de Mendoza	Spain; Italy	Pirate film
Les Coups pour rien	Pierre Lambert	Pierre Brice, Yanti Somer	France	
Creatures the World Forgot	Don Chaffey	Julie Ege	United Kingdom	Fantasy adventure
A Fistful of Dynamite	Sergio Leone	James Coburn, Rod Steiger	Italy; United States; Spain	Western
The Garden of Aunt Isabel	Felipe Cazals	Jorge Martínez de Hoyos, Claudio Brook, Ofelia Guilmáin, Jorge Luke	Mexico	
Haiducii lui Șaptecai	Dinu Cocea	Florin Piersic, Marga Barbu	Romania	
Heißer Sand	Günter Gräwert	Joachim Fuchsberger, Sieghardt Rupp	West Germany	
The Horsemen	John Frankenheimer	Omar Sharif, Jack Palance, Leigh Taylor-Young	United States	
How Tasty Was My Little Frenchman	Nelson Pereira dos Santos	Arduíno Colassanti, Ana Maria Magalhães	Brazil	
Husaren in Berlin	Erwin Stranka	Manfred Krug	East Germany	Adventure comedy
Ivanhoe, the Norman Swordsman	Roberto Mauri	Mark Damon	Italy; Spain; France	
Kidnapped	Delbert Mann	Michael Caine, Trevor Howard, Jack Hawkins, Donald Pleasence	United Kingdom	
The Last Valley	James Clavell	Michael Caine, Omar Sharif, Florinda Bolkan	United Kingdom; United States	Adventure drama
The Light at the Edge of the World	Kevin Billington	Kirk Douglas, Yul Brynner, Samantha Eggar	Spain; United States	
Long Live Robin Hood	Giorgio Ferroni	Giuliano Gemma, Mario Adorf, Mark Damon	Italy; Spain; France	Adventure comedy
Long Live Your Death	Duccio Tessari	Franco Nero, Eli Wallach, Lynn Redgrave, Eduardo Fajardo, Horst Janson, Marilù Tolo	Italy; Spain; West Germany	Western
Lover of the Great Bear	Valentino Orsini	Giuliano Gemma, Senta Berger, Bruno Cremer	Italy	
Man in the Wilderness	Richard C. Sarafian	Richard Harris, John Huston	United States	Western
The Married Couple of the Year Two	Jean-Paul Rappeneau	Jean-Paul Belmondo, Marlène Jobert, Laura Antonelli, Sami Frey, Pierre Brasseur	France; Romania; Italy	
Mr. Forbush and the Penguins	Arne Sucksdorff, Alfred Viola, Roy Boulting	John Hurt, Hayley Mills, Dudley Sutton, Tony Britton	United Kingdom	Arctic adventure
Mr. Kingstreet's War	Percival Rubens	John Saxon, Tippi Hedren, Rossano Brazzi	South Africa	
Murphy's War	Peter Yates	Peter O'Toole, Horst Janson, Philippe Noiret, Siân Phillips	United Kingdom; United States	War adventure
La Poudre d'escampette	Philippe de Broca	Marlène Jobert, Michel Piccoli, Michael York	France; Italy	War adventure, adventure comedy
River of Gold	David Friedkin	Suzanne Pleshette, Ray Milland, Dack Rambo, Roger Davis	United States	
River of Mystery	Paul Stanley	Vic Morrow, Claude Akins, Edmond O'Brien, Louise Sorel	United States	
Romance of a Horsethief	Abraham Polonsky	Yul Brynner, Eli Wallach, Jane Birkin	Italy; France; Yugoslavia	Adventure comedy
A Season in Hell	Nelo Risi	Terence Stamp, Jean-Claude Brialy, Florinda Bolkan	Italy; France	Adventure drama
Il sergente Klems	Sergio Grieco	Peter Strauss, Tina Aumont, Luciana Paluzzi	Italy; Spain	War adventure
Sharks on Board	Arthur Maria Rabenalt	Freddy Quinn, Karin Dor, Werner Pochath	West Germany	Sea adventure
Tarkan Versus the Vikings	Mehmet Aslan	Kartal Tibet	Turkey	
The Tender Warrior	Stewart Raffill	Charles Lee, Dan Haggerty	United States	Family-oriented adventure
Walkabout	Nicolas Roeg	Jenny Agutter, Lucien John, David Gulpilil, John Meillon	Australia; United Kingdom	Adventure drama
X312 - Flight to Hell	Jesús Franco	Thomas Hunter, Gila von Weitershausen, Fernando Sancho	West Germany; Spain	
Von Richthofen and Brown	Roger Corman	John Phillip Law, Don Stroud	United States	War adventure
Willy Wonka & the Chocolate Factory	Mel Stuart	Gene Wilder, Jack Albertson	United States	
Zeppelin	Étienne Périer	Michael York, Elke Sommer	United Kingdom	War adventure

== 1972 ==
Title	Director	Cast	Country	Subgenre/Notes
À la guerre comme à la guerre	Bernard Borderie	Leonard Whiting, Curd Jürgens, Marianne Comtell	France; West Germany; Italy	Adventure comedy
Aguirre, the Wrath of God	Werner Herzog	Klaus Kinski, Cecilia Rivera, Ruy Guerra, Helena Rojo	West Germany; Peru	Adventure drama
The Bar at the Crossing	Alain Levent	Jacques Brel, Rosy Varte, Isabelle Huppert	France	
The Call of the Wild	Ken Annakin	Charlton Heston, Raimund Harmstorf, Michèle Mercier, George Eastman	United Kingdom; Italy; Spain; France; West Germany	
Cry of the Black Wolves	Harald Reinl	Ron Ely, Raimund Harmstorf, Gila von Weitershausen, Arthur Brauss	West Germany	Western
Deliverance	John Boorman	Jon Voight, Burt Reynolds, Ned Beatty, Ronny Cox	United States	Adventure drama
Dr. Phibes Rises Again	Robert Fuest	Vincent Price, Robert Quarry	United Kingdom	Horror adventure
Family Flight	Marvin J. Chomsky	Rod Taylor, Dina Merrill, Kristoffer Tabori	United States	
La grande avventura di Scaramouche	Piero Pierotti	Christian Hay, Grit Freyberg, Erna Schürer, Milly Vitale	Italy	
Great Treasure Hunt	Tonino Ricci	Mark Damon, Rosalba Neri	Italy; Spain	Western
Horror Express	Eugenio Martín	Christopher Lee, Peter Cushing, Telly Savalas	Spain; United Kingdom	Horror adventure
Jeremiah Johnson	Sydney Pollack	Robert Redford	United States	Western
Karzan, il favoloso uomo della jungla	Demofilo Fidani	Johnny Kissmuller Jr. (Armando Bottin)	Italy	
The Last Lion	Elmo De Witt	Jack Hawkins	South Africa	Adventure drama
I leoni di Pietroburgo	Mario Siciliano	Mark Damon	Italy	
The Little Ark	James B. Clark	Theodore Bikel, Geneviève Ambas, Philip Frame	United States	Sea adventure
Man from the Deep River	Umberto Lenzi	Ivan Rassimov, Me Me Lai	Italy	Horror adventure
Man of La Mancha	Arthur Hiller	Peter O'Toole, Sophia Loren, James Coco	Italy; United States	Musical
Meo Patacca	Marcello Ciorciolini	Gigi Proietti, Marilù Tolo	Italy	Adventure comedy
The Mighty Anselmo and His Squire	Bruno Corbucci	Alighiero Noschese, Enrico Montesano	Italy	Adventure comedy
Northeast of Seoul	David Lowell Rich	Anita Ekberg, John Ireland, Victor Buono	United States; Hong Kong	
Piranha	William Gibson	William Smith, Peter Brown, Ahna Capri, Tom Simcox	United States; Venezuela	
Un pirata de doce años	René Cardona Jr.	Hugo Stiglitz, René Cardona III, Christa Linder	Mexico	Pirate film
Pirates of Blood Island	José Luis Merino	Carlos Quiney, Stelvio Rosi	Spain; Italy	Pirate film
The Poseidon Adventure	Ronald Neame	Gene Hackman, Ernest Borgnine, Stella Stevens, Shelley Winters, Red Buttons, Carol Lynley	United States	Sea adventure
The Proud and Damned	Ferde Grofé Jr.	Chuck Connors, Cesar Romero	United States; Colombia	Western
The Seventh Bullet	Ali Hamroyev	Suimenkul Chokmorov, Dilorom Kambarova, Bolot Beyshenaliyev, Talgat Nigmatulin	Soviet Union	
Sex and Blood in the Trail of the Treasure	José Mojica Marins	Roque Rodrigues, Rosângela Maldonado, José Galã	Brazil	
Silent Running	Douglas Trumbull	Bruce Dern	United States	Space adventure
Solaris	Andrei Tarkovsky	Natalya Bondarchuk, Jüri Järvet, Donatas Banionis	Soviet Union	Space adventure, adventure drama
Sotto a chi tocca!	Gianfranco Parolini	Dean Reed	Italy; Spain; West Germany	Adventure comedy
The Stolen Battle	Erwin Stranka	Manfred Krug	Czechoslovakia; East Germany	Adventure comedy
Tintin and the Lake of Sharks	Raymond Leblanc		France; Belgium	Animated film, family-oriented adventure
Travels with My Aunt	George Cukor	Maggie Smith, Alec McCowen, Louis Gossett Jr., Robert Stephens	United States	Adventure comedy
Treasure Island	John Hough	Orson Welles, Lionel Stander, Walter Slezak, Rik Battaglia, Kim Burfield	United Kingdom; Spain; West Germany; Italy; France	Pirate film
La Vallée	Barbet Schroeder	Bulle Ogier	France	
La vergine di Bali	Guido Zurli	George Ardisson, Haydée Politoff	Italy	
What Am I Doing in the Middle of a Revolution?	Sergio Corbucci	Vittorio Gassman, Paolo Villaggio, Eduardo Fajardo	Italy; Spain	Adventure comedy, western
The Wrath of God	Ralph Nelson	Robert Mitchum, Frank Langella, Rita Hayworth, Victor Buono	United States	Western
Young Winston	Richard Attenborough	Simon Ward, Robert Shaw, Anne Bancroft, Jack Hawkins, Anthony Hopkins	United Kingdom	
Zambo, il dominatore della foresta	Bitto Albertini	Brad Harris, Gisela Hahn	Italy	

== 1973 ==
Title	Director	Cast	Country	Subgenre/Notes
Ace Eli and Rodger of the Skies	John Erman	Cliff Robertson, Eric Shea, Pamela Franklin, Bernadette Peters	United States	Adventure comedy
... All the Way, Boys!	Giuseppe Colizzi	Terence Hill, Bud Spencer	Italy	Adventure comedy
Beyond Atlantis	Eddie Romero	Patrick Wayne, John Ashley, Leigh Christian, George Nader, Vic Diaz	Philippines; United States	Sea adventure
Da Scaramouche or se vuoi l'assoluzione baciar devi sto... cordone!	Gianfranco Baldanello	Stelvio Rosi, Mario Brega	Italy	
The Day of the Dolphin	Mike Nichols	George C. Scott	United States	Science fiction adventure, sea adventure
Death Race	David Lowell Rich	Doug McClure, Lloyd Bridges, Eric Braeden, Roy Thinnes	United States	War adventure
The Edifying and Joyous Story of Colinot	Nina Companeez	Francis Huster, Ottavia Piccolo, Nathalie Delon, Bernadette Lafont, Brigitte Bardot	France	
Emperor of the North Pole	Robert Aldrich	Lee Marvin, Ernest Borgnine, Keith Carradine	United States	
Gawain and the Green Knight	Stephen Weeks	Murray Head, Nigel Green	United Kingdom	Fantasy adventure
The Golden Voyage of Sinbad	Gordon Hessler	John Phillip Law, Caroline Munro, Tom Baker	United Kingdom	Fantasy adventure, sea adventure
The Heroes	Duccio Tessari	Rod Taylor, Rod Steiger, Rosanna Schiaffino, Claude Brasseur, Terry-Thomas	Italy; France; Spain	War adventure
Holy God, Here Comes the Passatore!	Giuliano Carnimeo	George Hilton, Edwige Fenech	Italy; Spain	Adventure comedy
I Escaped from Devil's Island	William Witney	Jim Brown, Christopher George	United States	
In Desert and Wilderness	Wladyslaw Slesicki	Monika Rosca, Tomasz Mędrzak	Poland	Adventure drama
Jonathan Livingston Seagull	Hall Bartlett		United States	Family-oriented adventure
Juan Moreira	Leonardo Favio	Rodolfo Bebán	Argentina	Historical drama
Li chiamavano i tre moschettieri... invece erano quattro	Silvio Amadio	Tony Kendall, Ettore Manni, Stelvio Rosi	Italy	
Live and Let Die	Guy Hamilton	Roger Moore, Yaphet Kotto, Jane Seymour	United Kingdom	
Lost Horizon	Charles Jarrott	Peter Finch, Liv Ullmann, John Gielgud, Charles Boyer, Michael York, George Kennedy	United States	Musical
The Neptune Factor	Daniel Petrie	Ben Gazzara, Yvette Mimieux, Ernest Borgnine, Walter Pidgeon	United States	Science fiction adventure, sea adventure
The Night of the Witches	Amando de Ossorio	Simón Andreu, Kali Hansa, Jack Taylor	Spain	Horror adventure
Oklahoma Crude	Stanley Kramer	Faye Dunaway, George C. Scott, Jack Palance, John Mills	United States	
One Russian Summer	Antonio Calenda	Oliver Reed, Claudia Cardinale, John McEnery	Italy; United Kingdom	
Papillon	Franklin J. Schaffner	Steve McQueen, Dustin Hoffman	United States	
Profession : Aventuriers	Claude Mulot	Charles Southwood, Nathalie Delon, Curd Jürgens, André Pousse	France; Italy	
The Rainbow Boys	Gerald Potterton	Donald Pleasence, Don Calfa, Kate Reid	Canada	
Robin Hood	Wolfgang Reitherman	Andy Devine (voice), Brian Bedford (voice), Peter Ustinov (voice)	United States	Animated film, family-oriented adventure
Scalawag	Kirk Douglas	Kirk Douglas, George Eastman, Mark Lester, Neville Brand, Don Stroud, Lesley-Anne Down	United States; Italy	Pirate film
Shaft in Africa	John Guillermin	Richard Roundtree, Frank Finlay, Vonetta McGee	United States	
Sinbad and the Caliph of Baghdad	Pietro Francisci	Robert Malcolm, Sonia Wilson	Italy	
Super Fly T.N.T.	Ron O'Neal	Ron O'Neal, Roscoe Lee Browne, Sheila Frazier, Robert Guillaume, Jacques Sernas, William Berger	United States	
The Three Musketeers	Richard Lester	Michael York, Oliver Reed, Richard Chamberlain, Frank Finlay, Faye Dunaway, Raquel Welch, Charlton Heston, Christopher Lee, Geraldine Chaplin	Panama; United Kingdom	
Three Wishes for Cinderella	Václav Vorlíček	Libuše Šafránková	Czechoslovakia	Fantasy adventure, family-oriented adventure
Trader Horn	Reza Badiyi	Rod Taylor, Anne Heywood, Jean Sorel	United States	
La Valise	Georges Lautner	Mireille Darc, Michel Constantin, Jean-Pierre Marielle	France	Adventure comedy
War Goddess	Terence Young	Alena Johnston, Sabine Sun, Luciana Paluzzi	Italy; France; Spain	
White Fang	Lucio Fulci	Franco Nero, Raimund Harmstorf, Virna Lisi, Fernando Rey, John Steiner, Carole André	Italy; Spain; France	
White Lightning	Joseph Sargent	Burt Reynolds, Jennifer Billingsley, Ned Beatty, Bo Hopkins, R. G. Armstrong	United States	

== 1974 ==
Title	Director	Cast	Country	Subgenre/Notes
Alice in the Cities	Wim Wenders	Rüdiger Vogler, Yella Rottländer, Lisa Kreuzer	West Germany	
Arabian Nights	Pier Paolo Pasolini	Franco Merli, Ines Pellegrini, Ninetto Davoli	Italy; France	Fantasy adventure
The Arena	Steve Carver	Margaret Markov, Pam Grier	United States; Italy	
At Home Among Strangers	Nikita Mikhalkov	Yuri Bogatyryov, Anatoly Solonitsyn, Alexander Kaidanovsky	Soviet Union	
The Bears and I	Bernard McEveety	Patrick Wayne, Chief Dan George, Andrew Duggan, Michael Ansara	United States	Family-oriented adventure
The Beast	Sergio Corbucci	Giancarlo Giannini, Michel Constantin	Italy; France	
Bring Me the Head of Alfredo Garcia	Sam Peckinpah	Warren Oates	Mexico; United States	
Un capitán de quince años	Jesús Franco	José Manuel Marcos, Edmund Purdom, William Berger, Howard Vernon	Spain; France	Sea adventure
Captain Kronos – Vampire Hunter	Brian Clemens	Horst Janson, Caroline Munro, Ian Hendry	United Kingdom	Horror adventure
The Castaway Cowboy	Vincent McEveety	James Garner, Vera Miles, Eric Shea, Robert Culp	United States	
Carry On Dick	Gerald Thomas	Sid James, Barbara Windsor, Kenneth Williams, Hattie Jacques, Joan Sims	United Kingdom	Adventure comedy
Challenge to White Fang	Lucio Fulci	Franco Nero, Raimund Harmstorf, Virna Lisi, Hannelore Elsner, John Steiner, Werner Pochath, Harry Carey Jr.	Italy; West Germany; France	
Dakota	Wim Verstappen	Kees Brusse, Willeke van Ammelrooy, Monique van de Ven	Netherlands	Adventure drama
Dark Star	John Carpenter	Brian Narelle, Dan O'Bannon, Cal Kuniholm, Dre Pahich	United States	Space adventure
The Deluge	Jerzy Hoffman	Daniel Olbrychski	Poland; Soviet Union	
Dick Turpin	Fernando Merino	Cihangir Ghaffari, Inés Morales	Spain	
The Dove	Charles Jarrott	Joseph Bottoms, Deborah Raffin	United States	Sea adventure
Dschungelmädchen für zwei Halunken	Ernst Hofbauer	Alberto Dell'Acqua, Wolf Goldan	West Germany; Italy	Adventure comedy
La dynamite est bonne à boire	Aldo Sambrell, Gérard Trembasiewicz	Christopher Mitchum, Claudine Auger, Aldo Sambrell, Michel Bouquet	France; Spain	
Farfallon	Riccardo Pazzaglia	Franco Franchi, Ciccio Ingrassia	Italy	Adventure comedy
The Four Charlots Musketeers	André Hunebelle	Les Charlots, Daniel Ceccaldi, Josephine Chaplin	France	Adventure comedy
The Four Charlots Musketeers 2	André Hunebelle	Les Charlots, Daniel Ceccaldi, Josephine Chaplin	France	Adventure comedy
The Four Musketeers	Richard Lester	Michael York, Oliver Reed, Richard Chamberlain, Frank Finlay, Faye Dunaway, Raquel Welch, Charlton Heston, Christopher Lee, Geraldine Chaplin	United Kingdom	
Le Führer en folie	Philippe Clair	Henri Tisot, Alice Sapritch, Luis Rego	France	Adventure comedy, war adventure
'Gator Bait	Beverly Sebastian, Ferd Sebastian	Claudia Jennings	United States	
The God King	Lester James Peries	Leigh Lawson, Oliver Tobias, Ravindra Randeniya	Sri Lanka; United Kingdom	
Gold	Peter R. Hunt	Roger Moore, Susannah York, Ray Milland, John Gielgud	United Kingdom	
Herbie Rides Again	Robert Stevenson	Helen Hayes, Ken Berry, Stefanie Powers	United States	
Huckleberry Finn	J. Lee Thompson	Jeff East, Paul Winfield	United States	Musical
The Island at the Top of the World	Robert Stevenson	Donald Sinden, David Hartman	United States	Fantasy adventure, family-oriented adventure
Kit & Co	Konrad Petzold	Dean Reed, Manfred Krug, Rolf Hoppe, Armin Mueller-Stahl	East Germany	Western
The Life and Times of Grizzly Adams	Richard Friedenberg	Dan Haggerty, Denver Pyle	United States	Western
The Man with the Golden Gun	Guy Hamilton	Roger Moore, Christopher Lee, Britt Ekland, Maud Adams	United Kingdom	
The Mark of Zorro	Don McDougall	Frank Langella, Ricardo Montalbán, Gilbert Roland, Anne Archer, Yvonne De Carlo	United States	
Miracles Still Happen	Giuseppe Maria Scotese	Susan Penhaligon	Italy	Adventure drama
Mr. Majestyk	Richard Fleischer	Charles Bronson, Al Lettieri, Linda Cristal	United States	
Nemuritorii	Sergiu Nicolaescu	Amza Pellea	Romania	
No Gold for a Dead Diver	Harald Reinl	Horst Janson, Marius Weyers, Sandra Prinsloo, Monika Lundi	West Germany	Sea adventure
Now Where Did the 7th Company Get to?	Robert Lamoureux	Jean Lefebvre, Pierre Mondy, Aldo Maccione	France	War adventure, adventure comedy
The Pacific Connection	Luis Nepomuceno	Roland Dantes, Nancy Kwan, Gilbert Roland, Dean Stockwell, Alejandro Rey, Vic Diaz	Philippines	
The Prey	Domenico Paolella	Zeudi Araya, Renzo Montagnani, Franco Gasparri, Micheline Presle	Italy; Colombia	
Savage Sisters	Eddie Romero	Gloria Hendry, Cheri Caffaro, Rosanna Ortiz, John Ashley, Vic Diaz	Philippines	
Swallows and Amazons	Claude Whatham	Virginia McKenna, Ronald Fraser	United Kingdom	Family-oriented adventure, sea adventure
Swept Away	Lina Wertmüller	Giancarlo Giannini, Mariangela Melato	Italy	
Two Missionaries	Franco Rossi	Terence Hill, Bud Spencer	Italy	Adventure comedy
Visit to a Chief's Son	Lamont Johnson	Richard Mulligan, Johnny Sekka	United States	Adventure drama
What Changed Charley Farthing?	Sidney Hayers	Doug McClure, Hayley Mills, Lionel Jeffries, Alberto de Mendoza, Fernando Sancho	United Kingdom; Spain	Sea adventure
When the North Wind Blows	Stewart Raffill	Henry Brandon, Fernando Celis, Dan Haggerty	United States	
While There's War There's Hope	Alberto Sordi	Alberto Sordi	Italy	
White Fang to the Rescue	Tonino Ricci	Maurizio Merli, Henry Silva	Italy	

== 1975 ==
Title	Director	Cast	Country	Subgenre/Notes
92 in the Shade	Thomas McGuane	Peter Fonda, Warren Oates, Margot Kidder, Harry Dean Stanton, Elizabeth Ashley, Burgess Meredith	United States	Sea adventure
The Adventures of the Wilderness Family	Stewart Raffill	Robert Logan, Susan Damante-Shaw	United States	Family-oriented adventure
Africa Express	Michele Lupo	Giuliano Gemma, Ursula Andress, Jack Palance	Italy	Adventure comedy
The Arrows of Robin Hood	Sergei Tarasov	Boris Khmelnitsky	Soviet Union	
Barry Lyndon	Stanley Kubrick	Ryan O'Neal, Marisa Berenson, Hardy Krüger	United Kingdom; United States	
Bite the Bullet	Richard Brooks	Gene Hackman, James Coburn, Candice Bergen, Ben Johnson	United States	Western
Blonde in Black Leather	Carlo Di Palma	Claudia Cardinale, Monica Vitti	Italy	
Breakout	Tom Gries	Charles Bronson, Robert Duvall, John Huston, Jill Ireland	United States	
Cagliostro	Daniele Pettinari	Bekim Fehmiu, Curd Jürgens, Rosanna Schiaffino, Evelyn Stewart, Massimo Girotti	Italy	
Challenge to Be Free	Tay Garnett	Mike Mazurki	United States	
The Count of Monte Cristo	David Greene	Richard Chamberlain, Tony Curtis, Donald Pleasence, Louis Jourdan, Trevor Howard, Kate Nelligan, Taryn Power	United Kingdom	
Death Race 2000	Paul Bartel	David Carradine, Simone Griffeth, Sylvester Stallone	United States	Science fiction adventure
Dersu Uzala	Akira Kurosawa	Maxim Munzuk, Yuri Solomin, Vladimir Kremena	Soviet Union; Japan	Adventure drama
Doc Savage: The Man of Bronze	Michael Anderson	Ron Ely	United States	
Docteur Justice	Christian-Jaque	John Phillip Law, Nathalie Delon, Gert Fröbe, Paul Naschy	France; Spain	Sea adventure
The Eiger Sanction	Clint Eastwood	Clint Eastwood, George Kennedy, Vonetta McGee, Reiner Schöne, Heidi Brühl	United States	
Get Mean	Ferdinando Baldi	Tony Anthony, Lloyd Battista, Raf Baldassarre, Diana Lorys	Italy; United States	Fantasy adventure
The Great Waldo Pepper	George Roy Hill	Robert Redford, Bo Svenson, Susan Sarandon, Bo Brundin	United States	Adventure drama
The Grizzly and the Treasure	James T. Flocker	Susan Backlinie, Scott Beach, Andre Gordon, Robert Sheble	United States	Family-oriented adventure
He Is My Brother	Edward Dmytryk	Bobby Sherman, Keenan Wynn	United States	
Hey, I'm Alive	Lawrence Schiller	Ed Asner, Sally Struthers	United States	
Huckleberry Finn	Robert Totten	Ron Howard, Antonio Fargas, Jack Elam	United States	
Jaws	Steven Spielberg	Roy Scheider, Robert Shaw, Richard Dreyfuss, Lorraine Gary, Murray Hamilton	United States	Sea adventure
Kilma, Queen of the Jungle	Miguel Iglesias Bonns	Eva Miller (Blanca Estrada), Paul Naschy, Maria Perschy	Spain	
The Land That Time Forgot	Kevin Connor	Doug McClure, John McEnery	United Kingdom	Fantasy adventure
Legend of the Sea Wolf	Giuseppe Vari	Chuck Connors, Barbara Bach	Italy	Sea adventure
The Log of the Black Pearl	Andrew V. McLaglen	Ralph Bellamy, Kiel Martin, Jack Kruschen	United States	Sea adventure
Lovers Like Us	Jean-Paul Rappeneau	Catherine Deneuve, Yves Montand	France; Italy	Sea adventure
Lucky Lady	Stanley Donen	Burt Reynolds, Gene Hackman, Liza Minnelli	United States	Sea adventure
Man Friday	Jack Gold	Peter O'Toole, Richard Roundtree	United Kingdom; United States	
The Man Who Would Be King	John Huston	Sean Connery, Michael Caine, Christopher Plummer, Saeed Jaffrey	United Kingdom	
The Man Who Would Not Die	Robert Arkless	Dorothy Malone, Keenan Wynn, Aldo Ray	United States	Sea adventure
Mark of Zorro	Franco Lo Cascio	George Hilton, Lionel Stander	Italy; Spain	Adventure comedy
Monty Python and the Holy Grail	Terry Gilliam, Terry Jones	Graham Chapman, John Cleese, Eric Idle, Terry Gilliam, Terry Jones, Michael Palin	United Kingdom	Adventure comedy
Opération Lady Marlène	Robert Lamoureux	Robert Lamoureux, Michel Serrault, Bernard Ménez, Sybil Danning	France	War adventure
Paper Tiger	Ken Annakin	David Niven, Kazuhito Ando, Toshiro Mifune, Hardy Krüger	United Kingdom	
The Passenger	Michelangelo Antonioni	Jack Nicholson, Maria Schneider	United States	
Il richiamo del lupo	Gianfranco Baldanello	Fernando E. Romero, Jack Palance, Joan Collins	Italy; Spain	
Robin Hood Never Dies	Francesc Bellmunt	Charly Bravo, Emma Cohen, Luis Induni	Spain	
Royal Flash	Richard Lester	Malcolm McDowell, Oliver Reed, Alan Bates, Britt Ekland, Florinda Bolkan	United Kingdom	Adventure comedy
Search for the Gods	Jud Taylor	Kurt Russell, Stephen McHattie, Ralph Bellamy	United States	
Sharks' Treasure	Cornel Wilde	Cornel Wilde, Yaphet Kotto	United States	Sea adventure
Tarzoon: Shame of the Jungle	Picha		France; Belgium	Animated film, adventure comedy
Three Men in a Boat	Stephen Frears	Tim Curry, Michael Palin, Stephen Moore	United Kingdom	Adventure comedy
Timber Tramps	Tay Garnett	Claude Akins, Joseph Cotten, Cesar Romero	United States	
The Treasure of Jamaica Reef	Virginia L. Stone	Stephen Boyd	United States	Sea adventure
The Ultimate Warrior	Robert Clouse	Yul Brynner, Max von Sydow	United States	Science fiction adventure
El valle de los miserables	René Cardona Jr.	Mario Almada	Mexico	
Viaje fantástico en globo	René Cardona Jr.	Hugo Stiglitz	Mexico	
White Fang and the Hunter	Alfonso Brescia	Robert Woods	Italy	
Who Breaks... Pays	Giorgio Ferroni	Brad Harris, Giancarlo Prete, Gianni Rizzo	Italy; Turkey	Adventure comedy
The Wind and the Lion	John Milius	Sean Connery, Candice Bergen, Brian Keith	United States	
Zorro	Duccio Tessari	Alain Delon, Stanley Baker, Moustache	France; Italy	

== 1976 ==
Title	Director	Cast	Country	Subgenre/Notes
The Adventures of Frontier Fremont	Richard Friedenberg	Dan Haggerty, Denver Pyle, Tony Mirrati	United States	Western, family-oriented adventure
At the Earth's Core	Kevin Connor	Doug McClure, Peter Cushing, Caroline Munro	United Kingdom; United States	Science fiction adventure, fantasy adventure
Atraco en la jungla	Gordon Hessler	Robert Vaughn, Katia Christine, Simón Andreu	Spain; Venezuela	
The Black Corsair	Sergio Sollima	Kabir Bedi, Mel Ferrer, Carole André, Dagmar Lassander	Italy	Pirate film
Brenda Starr	Mel Stuart	Jill St. John, Victor Buono	United States	
The Call of the Wild	Jerry Jameson	John Beck, Bernard Fresson, Billy "Green" Bush	United States	
Countdown at Kusini	Ossie Davis	Ruby Dee, Greg Morris, Ossie Davis	United States; Nigeria	
The Diamond Peddlers	Giuliano Carnimeo	Michael Coby, Paul Smith, Jacques Herlin	Italy	Adventure comedy
The Eagle Has Landed	John Sturges	Michael Caine, Donald Sutherland, Robert Duvall	United Kingdom	
Eliza Fraser	Tim Burstall	Susannah York, Trevor Howard, John Waters, John Castle, Noel Ferrier, Abigail	Australia	
Escape from Angola	Leslie H. Martinson	Stan Brock, Anne Collings	United States	
Foxtrot	Arturo Ripstein	Peter O'Toole, Charlotte Rampling, Max von Sydow, Jorge Luke, Helena Rojo, Claudio Brook	Mexico	Adventure drama
Grizzly	William Girdler	Christopher George, Andrew Prine, Richard Jaeckel	United States	Horror adventure
High Velocity	Remi Kramer	Ben Gazzara, Britt Ekland, Paul Winfield, Keenan Wynn	United States	
Killer Force	Val Guest	Peter Fonda, Telly Savalas, Christopher Lee, Maud Adams	Ireland; Switzerland; United States	
Kilma, Queen of the Amazons	Miguel Iglesias Bonns	Eva Miller (Blanca Estrada)	Spain	
King Kong	John Guillermin	Jessica Lange, Jeff Bridges, Charles Grodin	United States	
Legenda o Tile	Aleksandr Alov, Vladimir Naumov	Lembit Ulfsak, Natalya Belokhvostikova, Yevgeny Leonov	Soviet Union	
Logan's Run	Michael Anderson	Michael York, Jenny Agutter, Peter Ustinov, Farrah Fawcett	United States	Science fiction adventure
The Loves and Times of Scaramouche	Enzo G. Castellari	Michael Sarrazin, Ursula Andress, Aldo Maccione	Italy	Adventure comedy
Max Havelaar	Fons Rademakers	Peter Faber, Sacha Bulthuis, Rutger Hauer	Netherlands	Adventure drama
The Message	Moustapha Akkad	Anthony Quinn, Irene Papas, Michael Ansara, Johnny Sekka, Michael Forest	United Kingdom; Morocco; Libya; Kuwait; Lebanon	
Mr. Robinson	Sergio Corbucci	Paolo Villaggio, Zeudi Araya	Italy	Adventure comedy
Mr. Rossi Looks for Happiness	Bruno Bozzetto		Italy	Animated film, fantasy adventure
The Muthers	Cirio H. Santiago	Jean Bell, Rosanne Katon, Trina Parks, Jayne Kennedy	Philippines	
Les Naufragés de l'île de la Tortue	Jacques Rozier	Pierre Richard	France	Adventure comedy
Noroît	Jacques Rivette	Geraldine Chaplin, Bernadette Lafont	France	
North Sea Is Dead Sea	Hark Bohm	Uwe Bohm, Dschingis Bowakow	West Germany	Sea adventure
Panache	Gary Nelson	René Auberjonois, Amy Irving	United States	
Robin and Marian	Richard Lester	Sean Connery, Audrey Hepburn, Robert Shaw, Nicol Williamson, Richard Harris	United Kingdom	Romantic adventure
Safari Express	Duccio Tessari	Giuliano Gemma, Ursula Andress, Jack Palance	Italy	Adventure comedy
Shoot	Harvey Hart	Cliff Robertson, Ernest Borgnine, Henry Silva	Canada; United States	
Shout at the Devil	Peter Hunt	Roger Moore, Lee Marvin, Barbara Parkins, Ian Holm, Reinhard Kolldehoff, Horst Janson, Karl Michael Vogler	United Kingdom	
Silver Streak	Arthur Hiller	Gene Wilder, Jill Clayburgh, Richard Pryor, Patrick McGoohan, Ned Beatty, Richard Kiel	United States	
The Slipper and the Rose	Bryan Forbes	Richard Chamberlain, Gemma Craven, Margaret Lockwood, Michael Hordern, Edith Evans, Kenneth More	United States	Musical, fantasy adventure
Smuga cienia	Andrzej Wajda	Tom Wilkinson, Bernard Archard, Marek Kondrat	Poland	Sea adventure, adventure drama
The Smurfs and the Magic Flute	Peyo		France; Belgium	Animated film, family-oriented adventure
Soldier of Fortune	Pasquale Festa Campanile	Bud Spencer	Italy	Adventure comedy
Swashbuckler	James Goldstone	Robert Shaw, Geneviève Bujold, James Earl Jones, Peter Boyle	United States	Pirate film
Treasure of Matecumbe	Vincent McEveety	Peter Ustinov, Robert Foxworth, Joan Hackett, Vic Morrow	United States	Family-oriented adventure
The Twelve Tasks of Asterix	René Goscinny, Albert Uderzo		France; Belgium	Animated film, adventure comedy

== 1977 ==
Title	Director	Cast	Country	Subgenre/Notes
The African Queen	Richard C. Sarafian	Warren Oates, Mariette Hartley	United States	
Airport '77	Jerry Jameson	Jack Lemmon, James Stewart, Lee Grant, George Kennedy, Olivia de Havilland, Joseph Cotten, Christopher Lee	United States	Sea adventure, disaster film
The Black Pearl	Saul Swimmer	Gilbert Roland, Carl Anderson, Mario Custodio	United States	Sea adventure
The Brothers Lionheart	Olle Hellbom	Staffan Götestam, Lars Söderdahl, Allan Edwall, Gunn Wållgren, Per Oscarsson	Sweden	Family-oriented adventure, fantasy adventure
Captains Courageous	Harvey Hart	Karl Malden, Ricardo Montalbán, Jonathan Kahn, Fred Gwynne, Neville Brand	United States	Sea adventure
Casanova & Co.	Franz Antel	Tony Curtis, Marisa Berenson, Britt Ekland, Sylva Koscina, Marisa Mell, Andréa Ferréol, Hugh Griffith, Jean Lefebvre, Umberto Orsini	Austria; Italy; France	
Checkered Flag or Crash	Alan Gibson	Joe Don Baker, Susan Sarandon, Larry Hagman	United States	
Cosmos: War of the Planets	Alfonso Brescia	John Richardson, Yanti Somer, Massimo Bonetti	Italy	Science fiction adventure
Le Crabe-tambour	Pierre Schoendoerffer	Jean Rochefort, Claude Rich, Jacques Perrin, Jacques Dufilho	France	
Cuibul salamandrelor	Mircea Drăgan	Stuart Whitman, Woody Strode, Ray Milland, Gheorghe Dinică, William Berger, Tony Kendall, Gordon Mitchell	Romania; Italy	
Damnation Alley	Jack Smight	Jan-Michael Vincent, George Peppard, Dominique Sanda, Paul Winfield	United States	Science fiction adventure
Death or Freedom	Wolf Gremm	Peter Sattmann, Gert Fröbe, Mario Adorf, Erika Pluhar, Harald Leipnitz	West Germany	
The Deep	Peter Yates	Jacqueline Bisset, Nick Nolte, Robert Shaw, Eli Wallach, Louis Gossett Jr.	United States	Sea adventure
Dot and the Kangaroo	Yoram Gross		Australia	Family-oriented adventure
The Duellists	Ridley Scott	Keith Carradine, Harvey Keitel, Albert Finney, Edward Fox, Tom Conti	United States	Adventure drama
Emanuelle and the Last Cannibals	Joe D'Amato	Laura Gemser, Gabriele Tinti	Italy	Horror adventure
Galyon	Ivan Tors	Stan Brock, Ina Balin, Lloyd Nolan	United States	
Golden Rendezvous	Ashley Lazarus	Richard Harris, Ann Turkel, Gordon Jackson, John Vernon, David Janssen, Burgess Meredith, Dorothy Malone, John Carradine	United Kingdom; United States	Sea adventure
Guardian of the Wilderness	David O'Malley	Denver Pyle	United States	
Gulliver's Travels	Peter Hunt	Richard Harris	United Kingdom; Belgium	Live-action/animated film, fantasy adventure
Herbie Goes to Monte Carlo	Vincent McEveety	Dean Jones, Don Knotts, Julie Sommars	United States	Family-oriented adventure
The Hobbit	Arthur Rankin Jr., Jules Bass		United States; Japan	Animated film, fantasy adventure
The Inglorious Bastards	Enzo G. Castellari	Bo Svenson, Fred Williamson, Peter Hooten, Michel Constantin, Raimund Harmstorf, Ian Bannen	Italy	War adventure
The Island of Dr. Moreau	Don Taylor	Burt Lancaster, Michael York, Nigel Davenport, Barbara Carrera, Richard Basehart	United States	Science fiction adventure
Islands in the Stream	Franklin J. Schaffner	George C. Scott, David Hemmings, Gilbert Roland, Claire Bloom	United States	Adventure drama, sea adventure
Jabberwocky	Terry Gilliam	Michael Palin	United Kingdom	Fantasy adventure, adventure comedy
Joseph Andrews	Tony Richardson	Peter Firth, Ann-Margret, Natalie Ogle, Michael Hordern, Beryl Reid, John Gielgud, Hugh Griffith	United Kingdom	Adventure comedy, romantic adventure
Joyride	Joseph Ruben	Desi Arnaz Jr., Robert Carradine, Melanie Griffith, Anne Lockhart	United States	
The Last Dinosaur	Alex Grasshoff, Tsugunobu Kotani	Richard Boone	Japan; United States	Fantasy adventure
The Last Remake of Beau Geste	Marty Feldman	Marty Feldman, Peter Ustinov, Ann-Margret, Michael York	United States	Adventure comedy
The Man in the Iron Mask	Mike Newell	Richard Chamberlain, Louis Jourdan, Patrick McGoohan, Jenny Agutter, Ralph Richardson, Ian Holm	United Kingdom; United States	
March or Die	Dick Richards	Gene Hackman, Terence Hill, Catherine Deneuve, Max von Sydow	United Kingdom	
The Mighty Peking Man	Ho Meng Hua	Evelyne Kraft, Danny Lee	Hong Kong	
Moonshine County Express	Gus Trikonis	John Saxon, Susan Howard, William Conrad, Claudia Jennings	United States	
The Mouse and His Child	Charles Swenson, Fred Wolf	Peter Ustinov (voice), Cloris Leachman (voice), Sally Kellerman (voice)	United States; Japan	Animated film, family-oriented adventure
Orca	Michael Anderson	Richard Harris, Charlotte Rampling, Will Sampson	United States	Sea adventure, horror adventure
The People That Time Forgot	Kevin Connor	Patrick Wayne, Sarah Douglas, Doug McClure	United Kingdom; United States	Fantasy adventure
El Perro	Antonio Isasi-Isasmendi	Jason Miller, Lea Massari	Spain	
Planet of Dinosaurs	James Shea	Max Thayer, Louie Lawless, James Whitworth	United States	Space adventure
The Prince and the Pauper	Richard Fleischer	Oliver Reed, Raquel Welch, Mark Lester, Charlton Heston, Ernest Borgnine, George C. Scott, Rex Harrison	United Kingdom; United States	
Race for Your Life, Charlie Brown	Bill Melendez		United States	Animated film, family-oriented adventure
The Rescuers	Don Bluth, Milt Kahl, John Lounsbery, Wolfgang Reitherman, Art Stevens	Bob Newhart (voice), Eva Gabor (voice)	United States	Animated film, family-oriented adventure
El rey de los gorilas	René Cardona Jr.	Hugo Stiglitz	Mexico	
Rituals	Peter Carter	Hal Holbrook	Canada	Horror adventure
Sahara Cross	Tonino Valerii	Franco Nero, Michel Constantin	Italy	
The Seventh Company Outdoors	Robert Lamoureux	Jean Lefebvre, Pierre Mondy, Henri Guybet	France	War adventure, adventure comedy
Shock Waves	Ken Wiederhorn	Peter Cushing, Brooke Adams, John Carradine	United States	Horror adventure, sea adventure
Sinbad and the Eye of the Tiger	Sam Wanamaker	Patrick Wayne, Taryn Power, Margaret Whiting, Jane Seymour	United States; United Kingdom	Fantasy adventure, sea adventure
Smokey and the Bandit	Hal Needham	Burt Reynolds, Sally Field, Jerry Reed	United States	
Sorcerer	William Friedkin	Roy Scheider, Bruno Cremer, Francisco Rabal, Amidou	United States	
The Spy Who Loved Me	Lewis Gilbert	Roger Moore, Barbara Bach, Curd Jürgens, Richard Kiel, Caroline Munro	United Kingdom	
Star Wars	George Lucas	Mark Hamill, Carrie Fisher, Harrison Ford, Alec Guinness, Peter Cushing	United States	Space adventure
La tigre è ancora viva: Sandokan alla riscossa!	Sergio Sollima	Kabir Bedi, Philippe Leroy, Adolfo Celi, Mirella D'Angelo, Teresa Ann Savoy	Italy	
Thunder and Lightning	Corey Allen	David Carradine, Kate Jackson	United States	
Ultimo mondo cannibale	Ruggero Deodato	Massimo Foschi, Me Me Lai, Ivan Rassimov	Italy	Horror adventure
Unterwegs nach Atlantis	Siegfried Kühn	Carl Heinz Choynski, Rolf Hoppe	East Germany	Adventure comedy
The War in Space	Jun Fukuda	Kensaku Morita, Yūko Asano, Masaya Oki, Ryō Ikebe	Japan	Space adventure
The White Buffalo	J. Lee Thompson	Charles Bronson, Will Sampson, Jack Warden, Slim Pickens, Kim Novak, Clint Walker, Stuart Whitman, John Carradine	United States	Western
Wizards	Ralph Bakshi		United States	Animated film, fantasy adventure
World Safari	Alby Mangels	Alby Mangels	Australia	

== 1978 ==
Title	Director	Cast	Country	Subgenre/Notes
80 Hussars	Sándor Sára	László Dózsa, Géza Tordy, József Madaras	Hungary	
Avalanche	Corey Allen	Rock Hudson, Mia Farrow, Robert Forster	United States	
The Bermuda Depths	Tsugunobu Kotani	Leigh McCloskey, Carl Weathers, Connie Sellecca, Burl Ives	United States; Japan	Sea adventure, fantasy adventure
Blue Fin	Carl Schultz	Hardy Krüger, Greg Rowe	Australia	Sea adventure
Caravans	James Fargo	Anthony Quinn, Christopher Lee, Michael Sarrazin, Jennifer O'Neill	United States; Iran	
Cyclone	René Cardona Jr.	Arthur Kennedy, Carroll Baker, Lionel Stander, Andrés García, Hugo Stiglitz, Olga Karlatos	Mexico	Sea adventure
The First Great Train Robbery	Michael Crichton	Sean Connery, Donald Sutherland, Lesley-Anne Down	United Kingdom	
Flatfoot in Africa	Steno	Bud Spencer, Werner Pochath, Dagmar Lassander	Italy	Adventure comedy
Force 10 from Navarone	Guy Hamilton	Robert Shaw, Harrison Ford, Edward Fox, Barbara Bach, Franco Nero, Carl Weathers, Richard Kiel	United Kingdom	War adventure
The Four Feathers	Don Sharp	Beau Bridges, Robert Powell, Simon Ward, Jane Seymour	United Kingdom; United States	
The Further Adventures of the Wilderness Family	Frank Zuniga	Robert Logan, Susan Damante-Shaw	United States	Family-oriented adventure
Hunters of the Reef	Alexander Singer	Mary Louise Weller, Michael Parks, William Windom, Stephen Macht	United States	Sea adventure
The Iland's Devil	Samir Darwish	Mahmoud Abdel Aziz, Yousra	Syria	
Land of No Return	Kent Bateman	Mel Tormé, William Shatner	United States	
The Lord of the Rings	Ralph Bakshi		United States	Animated film, fantasy adventure
Magee and the Lady	Gene Levitt	Tony Lo Bianco, Sally Kellerman	Australia	Sea adventure, adventure comedy
Message from Space	Kinji Fukasaku	Sonny Chiba, Vic Morrow	Japan	Space adventure
Midnight Express	Alan Parker	Brad Davis, John Hurt, Irene Miracle, Paul L. Smith	United Kingdom; United States	Adventure drama
The Mountain of the Cannibal God	Sergio Martino	Ursula Andress, Stacy Keach	Italy	Horror adventure
The Norseman	Charles B. Pierce	Lee Majors, Cornel Wilde, Mel Ferrer, Jack Elam	United States	
Olly Olly Oxen Free	Richard A. Colla	Katharine Hepburn	United States	Family-oriented adventure
Operation Leopard	Raoul Coutard	Bruno Cremer, Giuliano Gemma, Jacques Perrin, Laurent Malet, Pierre Vaneck, Mimsy Farmer	France	War adventure, adventure drama
Out of the Darkness	Lee Madden	Donald Pleasence, Nancy Kwan, Ross Hagen	United States	Horror adventure
Return from Witch Mountain	John Hough	Bette Davis, Christopher Lee	United States	
Safari Rally	Bitto Albertini	Joe Dallesandro, Marcel Bozzuffi, Olga Bisera, Eleonora Giorgi	Italy	
The Sea Gypsies	Stewart Raffill	Robert Logan, Heather Rattray	United States	Sea adventure, family-oriented adventure
Starcrash	Luigi Cozzi	Caroline Munro, Christopher Plummer, Joe Spinell, Marjoe Gortner, David Hasselhoff	United States; Italy	Space adventure
Superman	Richard Donner	Christopher Reeve, Margot Kidder, Marlon Brando, Gene Hackman, Ned Beatty, Valerie Perrine, Glenn Ford, Susannah York	United Kingdom; United States; Panama; Switzerland	Superhero film
The Thief of Baghdad	Clive Donner	Kabir Bedi, Peter Ustinov, Terence Stamp, Roddy McDowall, Marina Vlady	United Kingdom	Fantasy adventure
Tough to Kill	Joe D'Amato	Luc Merenda	Italy	War adventure
Warlords of Atlantis	Kevin Connor	Doug McClure	United Kingdom	Fantasy adventure
Watership Down	Martin Rosen		United Kingdom; United States	Animated film, adventure drama
Where Time Began	Juan Piquer Simón	Kenneth More	Spain	Fantasy adventure
The Wild Geese	Andrew V. McLaglen	Richard Burton, Roger Moore, Richard Harris, Hardy Krüger, Stewart Granger	United Kingdom	War adventure
The Wiz	Sidney Lumet	Diana Ross, Michael Jackson, Richard Pryor	United States	Fantasy adventure, musical

== 1979 ==
Title	Director	Cast	Country	Subgenre/Notes
Alien	Ridley Scott	Sigourney Weaver, John Hurt, Ian Holm, Tom Skerritt, Yaphet Kotto, Veronica Cartwright, Harry Dean Stanton	United States; United Kingdom	Space adventure, horror adventure
Apocalypse Now	Francis Ford Coppola	Martin Sheen, Marlon Brando, Robert Duvall, Dennis Hopper	United States	Adventure drama, war adventure
Arabian Adventure	Kevin Connor	Christopher Lee, Milo O'Shea, Oliver Tobias, Emma Samms, Peter Cushing, Capucine, Mickey Rooney	United Kingdom	Fantasy adventure
Ashanti	Richard Fleischer	Michael Caine, Beverly Johnson, Kabir Bedi, Peter Ustinov, Omar Sharif, Rex Harrison, William Holden	United States	Adventure drama
Avalanche Express	Mark Robson	Lee Marvin, Robert Shaw, Linda Evans, Maximilian Schell	United States; Ireland	
Bear Island	Don Sharp	Donald Sutherland, Vanessa Redgrave, Richard Widmark, Christopher Lee	United Kingdom; Canada	Arctic adventure
Beyond the Poseidon Adventure	Irwin Allen	Michael Caine, Sally Field, Telly Savalas, Karl Malden	United States	Sea adventure
The Black Hole	Gary Nelson	Maximilian Schell, Anthony Perkins, Ernest Borgnine, Yvette Mimieux, Robert Forster	United States	Space adventure
Black Jack	Ken Loach	Stephen Hirst, Louise Cooper, Jean Franval	United Kingdom	
The Black Stallion	Carroll Ballard	Kelly Reno, Mickey Rooney, Teri Garr	United States	Family-oriented adventure
The Bodyguard	Ali Hamroyev	Alexander Kaidanovsky, Anatoly Solonitsyn	Soviet Union	Action adventure
Buck Rogers in the 25th Century	Daniel Haller	Gil Gerard, Erin Gray, Tim O'Connor, Pamela Hensley, Henry Silva, Joseph Wiseman	United States	Space adventure
The Castle of Cagliostro	Hayao Miyazaki		Japan	Animated film
Cuba	Richard Lester	Sean Connery, Brooke Adams, Martin Balsam	United States	
Day of the Assassin	Brian Trenchard-Smith	Chuck Connors, Susana Dosamantes, Glenn Ford, Richard Roundtree, Henry Silva	Mexico; Spain; United States	Action adventure
Escape to Athena	George P. Cosmatos	Roger Moore, Telly Savalas, David Niven, Claudia Cardinale, Elliott Gould, Richard Roundtree, Stefanie Powers, Sonny Bono	United States	War adventure
Fast Charlie... the Moonbeam Rider	Steve Carver	David Carradine, Brenda Vaccaro	United States	
The Fifth Musketeer	Ken Annakin	Beau Bridges, Cornel Wilde, Sylvia Kristel, Ursula Andress, Rex Harrison, José Ferrer, Olivia de Havilland	United Kingdom; Austria	
Firepower	Michael Winner	James Coburn, Sophia Loren, Eli Wallach, O. J. Simpson	United Kingdom	
The First Christmas	Richard Slapczynski	Alistair Duncan (voice), Ron Haddrick (voice), Philip Hinton (voice)	Australia	
Game for Vultures	James Fargo	Richard Harris, Richard Roundtree, Joan Collins, Ray Milland	United Kingdom	
Goetz von Berlichingen of the Iron Hand	Wolfgang Liebeneiner, Harald Reinl	Raimund Harmstorf, Michèle Mercier, Klausjürgen Wussow, Reiner Schöne	West Germany	
Gold of the Amazon Women	Mark L. Lester	Bo Svenson, Anita Ekberg, Donald Pleasence	United States	
The Great Alligator	Sergio Martino	Barbara Bach, Claudio Cassinelli, Mel Ferrer, Richard Johnson	Italy	Horror adventure
A Great Ride	Don Hulette	Perry Lang, Michael Sullivan, Michael MacRae	United States	
Hangman's Brother	Walter Beck	Frank Grunwald, Gunter Friedrich, Thomas Wolff, Holger Mahlich	East Germany	
Hurricane	Jan Troell	Mia Farrow, Dayton Ka'ne, Jason Robards, Max von Sydow, Trevor Howard	United States	Romantic adventure
I'm for the Hippopotamus	Italo Zingarelli	Terence Hill, Bud Spencer	Italy	Adventure comedy
Island of the Fishmen	Sergio Martino	Barbara Bach, Claudio Cassinelli, Joseph Cotten, Richard Johnson	Italy	Science fiction adventure
Jaguar Lives!	Ernest Pintoff	Joe Lewis, Christopher Lee, Donald Pleasence, Barbara Bach, Capucine, Joseph Wiseman, Woody Strode, John Huston	United States; Spain	
Killer Fish	Antonio Margheriti	Lee Majors, Karen Black, Margaux Hemingway, Marisa Berenson, James Franciscus	Italy; Brazil	Horror adventure
King Solomon's Treasure	Alvin Rakoff	David McCallum, John Colicos, Patrick Macnee, Britt Ekland	United Kingdom; Canada	
Lady Oscar	Jacques Demy	Catriona MacColl	France; Japan	
The Last Giraffe	Jack Couffer	Susan Anspach, Simon Ward, Gordon Jackson	United States	Family-oriented adventure
Mad Max	George Miller	Mel Gibson	Australia	Science fiction adventure
Manaos	Alberto Vázquez-Figueroa	Fabio Testi, Agostina Belli, Jorge Rivero, Jorge Luke, Andrés García, Florinda Bolkan, Alberto de Mendoza	Spain; Mexico; Italy	
Mayflower: The Pilgrims' Adventure	George Schaefer	Anthony Hopkins, Richard Crenna, Jenny Agutter	United States	Sea adventure
Meetings with Remarkable Men	Peter Brook	Dragan Maksimović, Terence Stamp	United Kingdom	
Mistress of the Apes	Larry Buchanan	Jenny Neumann	United States	
Moonraker	Lewis Gilbert	Roger Moore, Lois Chiles, Michael Lonsdale, Richard Kiel, Corinne Cléry	United Kingdom; France	Action adventure, space adventure
Mountain Family Robinson	John Cotter	Robert Logan, Susan Damante-Shaw	United States	Family-oriented adventure
The Muppet Movie	James Frawley	Charles Durning, Dom DeLuise, Mel Brooks, Orson Welles, Telly Savalas, James Coburn, Steve Martin	United States; United Kingdom	Family-oriented adventure
Mysterious Island of Beautiful Women	Joseph Pevney	Clint Walker, Rosalind Chao, Peter Lawford, Deborah Shelton, Jayne Kennedy	United States	
North Sea Hijack	Andrew V. McLaglen	Roger Moore, James Mason, Anthony Perkins	United States; United Kingdom	Sea adventure
The Passage	J. Lee Thompson	Anthony Quinn, James Mason, Malcolm McDowell, Christopher Lee	United Kingdom	War adventure
The Prisoner of Zenda	Richard Quine	Peter Sellers, Lynne Frederick, Elke Sommer, Lionel Jeffries, Jeremy Kemp, Catherine Schell	United Kingdom	Adventure comedy
The Riddle of the Sands	Tony Maylam	Michael York, Simon MacCorkindale, Jenny Agutter, Alan Badel	United Kingdom	Sea adventure
The Shark Hunter	Enzo G. Castellari	Franco Nero, Werner Pochath, Jorge Luke, Eduardo Fajardo	Italy; Spain; Mexico	Sea adventure
The Spaceman and King Arthur	Russ Mayberry	Dennis Dugan, Jim Dale, Ron Moody, Kenneth More	Italy	Adventure comedy, science fiction adventure
Spirit of the Wind	Ralph Liddle	Pius Savage, Chief Dan George, Slim Pickens, George Clutesi	United States	
Stalker	Andrei Tarkovsky	Alexander Kaidanovsky, Anatoly Solonitsyn, Nikolai Grinko	Soviet Union	Science fiction adventure
Star Trek: The Motion Picture	Robert Wise	William Shatner, Leonard Nimoy, DeForest Kelley, Persis Khambatta, Stephen Collins	United States	Space adventure
Time After Time	Nicholas Meyer	Malcolm McDowell, David Warner, Mary Steenburgen	United States; United Kingdom	Science fiction adventure
A Touch of the Sun	Peter Curran	Oliver Reed, Peter Cushing	United Kingdom	Adventure comedy
The Treasure Seekers	Henry Levin	Rod Taylor, Stuart Whitman, Elke Sommer, Jeremy Kemp	United States; United Kingdom	Sea adventure
A Vacation in Hell	David Greene	Priscilla Barnes, Michael Brandon	United States	
Vlad Țepeș	Doru Năstase	Ștefan Sileanu	Romania	
Wanda Nevada	Peter Fonda	Brooke Shields, Peter Fonda	United States	
Zulu Dawn	Douglas Hickox	Peter O'Toole, Burt Lancaster, John Mills, Simon Ward, Denholm Elliott, Bob Hoskins	United States; United Kingdom	War adventure
