= Stan Brock =

Stan Brock may refer to:

- Stan Brock (American football) (born 1958), American football player
- Stan Brock (philanthropist) (1936–2018), British philanthropist, presenter and actor

== See also ==
- Stanley Brock (1931–1991), American film and television actor
