= List of animated television series of 1977 =

A list of animated television series first aired in 1977.

Animated television series first aired in 1977
Title	Episodes	Country	Year	Notes	Technique
A.E.I.O.U.	14	Italy	1977		Sand Animation
Adamo: L'acqua è vita	26	Italy	1977		Traditional
The All-New Super Friends Hour	15	United States	1977	Spin-off of Super Friends	Traditional
Angie Girl	26	Japan	1977–78		Anime
Arrow Emblem: Hawk of the Grand Prix	44	Japan	1977–78		Anime
Attack on Tomorrow!	23	Japan	1977		Anime
Les Aventures de l'Energie	13	France	1977		Traditional
Baggy Pants and the Nitwits	13	United States	1977		Traditional
Balatack	31	Japan	1977–78		Anime
The Batman/Tarzan Adventure Hour	52	United States	1977–78	Package series	Traditional
Blast-Off Buzzard	13	United States	1977	Segment on CB Bears.	Traditional
Captain Caveman and the Teen Angels	40	United States	1977–80	Originally aired as part of Scooby's All-Star Laff-A-Lympics	Traditional
CB Bears	13	United States	1977		Traditional
Cho Supercar Gattiger	26	Japan	1977–78		Anime
Chōgattai Majutsu Robo Ginguiser	26	Japan	1977		Anime
Dinosaur War Izenborg	39	Japan	1977–78		Anime
The Flumps	13	United Kingdom	1977		Stop-Motion
Fred Flintstone and Friends	16	United States	1977–78	Television package consisting of The Flintstone Comedy Hour, Goober and the Ghost Chasers, Jeannie, The Partridge Family in Outer Space, The Pebbles and Bamm-Bamm Show, and Yogi's Gang.	Traditional
Gekisō! Rubenkaiser	17	Japan	1977–78		Anime
The Gublins	13	United Kingdom	1977		Stop-Motion
Heyyy, It's the King!	13	United States	1977	Segment on CB Bears.	Traditional
Hungarian Folk Tales	100	Hungary	1977–2011		Traditional
Hyōga Senshi Gaislugger	20	Japan	1977		Anime
I Am the Greatest: The Adventures of Muhammad Ali	13	United States	1977		Traditional
Invincible Super Man Zambot 3	23	Japan	1977–78		Anime
Ippatsu Kanta-kun	53	Japan	1977–78		Anime
Jetter Mars	27	Japan	1977		Anime
A kockásfülű nyúl	26	Hungary	1977–79		Traditional
Laff-A-Lympics	24	United States	1977–78	Originally aired as part of Scooby's All-Star Laff-A-Lympics.	Traditional
Ludwig	25	United Kingdom	1977		Traditional
Lupin the 3rd Part II	155	Japan	1977–80		Anime
Manga Ijin Monogatari	46	Japan	1977–78		Anime
Manga Nihon Emaki	46	Japan	1977–78		Anime
Mechander Robo	35	Japan	1977		Anime
Monarch: The Big Bear of Tallac	26	Japan	1977		Anime
The New Adventures of Batman	16	United States	1977		Traditional
The New Archie and Sabrina Hour	13	United States	1977	Spin-off of The Archie Show and Sabrina the Teenage Witch.	Traditional
Nobody's Boy: Remi	51	Japan	1977–78		Anime
La Noiraude	61	France	1977		Traditional
Oma Bitte Kommen	27	West Germany	1977		Traditional
Ore wa Teppei	28	Japan	1977–78		Anime
Posse Impossible	13	United States	1977	Segment on CB Bears.	Traditional
Rascal the Raccoon	52	Japan	1977		Anime
The Robonic Stooges	32	United States	1977–78	Spin-off of The Three Stooges.	Traditional
Scooby's All-Star Laff-A-Lympics	16	United Kingdom	1977–78	Block consisting of Laff-A-Lympics, The Scooby-Doo Show, Scooby-Doo, Where Are You!, Captain Caveman and the Teen Angels, and The Blue Falcon & Dynomutt.	Traditional
Sender Nordlicht		West Germany	1977		Traditional
Shake, Rattle, & Roll	13	United States	1977	Segment on CB Bears.	Traditional
Shin Kyojin no Hoshi	52	Japan	1977–78		Anime
The Skatebirds	16	United States	1977–78		Traditional
Space Sentinels	13	United States	1977		Traditional
Squirrel and Hedgehog	32	North Korea	1977–2012		Traditional
Temple the Balloonist	26	Japan	1977–78		Anime
Les Tifins	635	France	1977–82		Traditional
Tobidase! Machine Hiryū	21	Japan	1977–78		Anime
The Toothbrush Family		Australia	1977		Traditional
Undercover Elephant	13	United States	1977	Segment on CB Bears.	Traditional
Voltes V	40	Japan	1977–78		Anime
Wakakusa no Charlotte	30	Japan	1977–78		Anime
Wakusei Robo Danguard Ace	56	Japan	1977–78		Anime
What's New, Mr. Magoo?	16	United States	1977		Traditional
Wonder Wheels	16	United States	1977	segment of The Skatebirds	Traditional
Yakyū-kyō no Uta	25	Japan	1977–79		Anime
Yatterman	108	Japan	1977–79		Anime

== See also ==
- List of animated feature films of 1977
- List of Japanese animation television series of 1977
