= Robin and Marian =

1976 film by Richard Lester

- Theatrical release poster by Drew Struzan
- Directed by: Richard Lester
- Written by: James Goldman
- Produced by: Denis O'Dell; Richard Shepherd; Ray Stark
- Starring: Sean Connery; Audrey Hepburn; Robert Shaw; Nicol Williamson; Denholm Elliott; Ronnie Barker; Kenneth Haigh; Ian Holm; Richard Harris
- Cinematography: David Watkin
- Music by: John Barry
- Production company: Rastar
- Distributed by: Columbia Pictures
- Release date: March 11, 1976
- Running time: 106 minutes
- Countries: United Kingdom; United States
- Language: English
- Budget: $5 million

Robin and Marian is a 1976 romantic adventure film from Columbia Pictures, shot in Panavision and Technicolor, that was directed by Richard Lester and written by James Goldman after the legend of Robin Hood. The film stars Sean Connery as Robin Hood, Audrey Hepburn as Lady Marian, Nicol Williamson as Little John, Robert Shaw as the Sheriff of Nottingham, Richard Harris as Richard the Lionheart, and Denholm Elliott as Will Scarlet. It also features comedian Ronnie Barker in a rare film role as Friar Tuck. Robin and Marian was filmed in Zamora, as well as Artajona, Urbasa, Quinto Real and Orgi, all small medieval villages in Navarre, Spain. It marked Hepburn's return to the screen after an eight-year absence, her last film being Wait Until Dark from 1967.

Lester made Robin and Marian amid a series of period pieces, including The Three Musketeers (1973). The original music score was composed by John Barry. The film originally was titled The Death of Robin Hood but was changed by Columbia Pictures to be more marketable, and perhaps give equal billing to Hepburn.

The film is based on the Robin Hood legend as it is told in A Gest of Robyn Hode, depicting his murder at the hands of a prioress he was related to, but changes the story by making his former love, Marian, the prioress, and making his murder an act of love, not betrayal.

== Plot ==
An aging Robin Hood has been a trusted captain fighting for King Richard the Lionheart for twenty years and is now in France, the Third Crusade over. Richard orders him to take a castle which is rumoured to hold a gold statue. Discovering that it is defended by a solitary, one-eyed old man who is sheltering women and children, and being told the statue is worthless stone, Robin and his right-hand man, Little John, refuse to attack. King Richard, angry, orders the pair's execution and the castle attacked, but is wounded with an arrow by the old man. Richard has the helpless residents massacred, with the exception of the old man, because Richard likes his eye. Mortally wounded, the King, after learning the old man was telling the truth, offers to let Robin beg for his life. When Robin refuses, Richard draws his sword, lacks the strength to strike him and falls. Robin helps the dying king and, moved by his loyalty, Richard frees Robin and Little John.

The two men return to England and reunite with old friends Will Scarlet and Friar Tuck in Sherwood Forest. Robin hears his exploits have become legendary. When Robin inquires about Maid Marian, Will and Tuck tell him where she lives. When Robin visits her, Marian finds him as impossible as ever, while he discovers she has become an abbess. He learns that his old nemesis, the Sheriff of Nottingham, has ordered Marian's arrest in response to King John's order to expel senior leaders of the Roman Catholic Church from England. The Sheriff is portrayed as a weary realist who perceives Robin as being a little in love with death.

When the Sheriff comes to arrest Marian, Robin rescues her against her will, striking Sir Ranulf, the Sheriff's arrogant guest, in the process. He also rescues the nuns, who have been locked in the Sheriff's castle. Ignoring the Sheriff's warnings, Sir Ranulf pursues Robin into the forest. Ranulf's men are ambushed and a number killed by arrows, but Sir Ranulf is spared by Robin. When the news of Robin's return spreads, old comrades and new recruits rally to him. Sir Ranulf asks King John for 200 soldiers to deal with him.

The Sheriff waits in the fields outside the forest with his men and Sir Ranulf. Robin's friends all tell him to stay in the forest, but the Sheriff knows Robin will be unable to resist seeing his old foe face-to-face. When Robin emerges, he proposes that he and the Sheriff settle the issue by single combat. Eventually, the Sheriff has the wounded Robin at his mercy and demands his surrender. Refusing, Robin kills the Sheriff with the last of his strength. Led by Sir Ranulf, the soldiers attack Robin's ragtag band, many of whom are captured or killed. Will Scarlet and Friar Tuck are captured but Little John kills Sir Ranulf. John and Marian take Robin to her abbey, where she keeps her medicine.

Robin believes he will recover to win future battles. Marian prepares a draught of medicine and drinks some herself before giving it to him. He drinks it and realizes that the pain has gone away and his legs have gone numb. Realizing Marian has poisoned them both, he cries out for Little John. Marian talks to him about how much she loves him. He sees that he would never have recovered, and Marian has committed an act of mercy. Robin and Marian try to touch each other's hands as Little John crashes through the door and weeps at Robin's bedside. Robin asks Little John for his bow and shoots an arrow from his deathbed through the open window; he asks Little John to bury them both where it lands.

== Cast ==
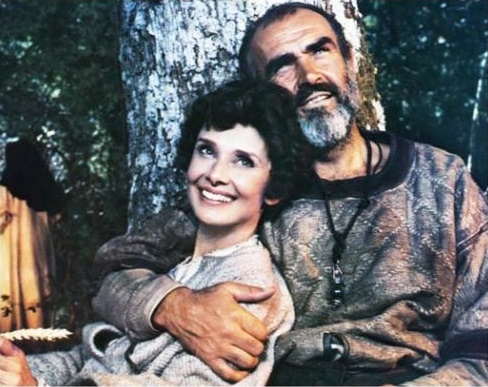
Hepburn and Connery as Marian and Robin Hood in the film

- Sean Connery as Robin Hood
- Audrey Hepburn as Marian/Mother Jennet
- Robert Shaw as the Sheriff of Nottingham
- Nicol Williamson as Little John
- Richard Harris as Richard the Lionheart
- Denholm Elliott as Will Scarlet
- Ronnie Barker as Friar Tuck
- Kenneth Haigh as Sir Ranulf de Pudsey
- Ian Holm as King John
- Bill Maynard as Mercadier
- Esmond Knight as Old Defender
- Veronica Quilligan as Sister Mary
- Peter Butterworth as Surgeon
- John Barrett as Jack
- Kenneth Cranham as Jack's Apprentice
- Victoria Abril as Queen Isabella

== Production ==
=== Filming ===
Principal photography took place in the late summer of 1975, on location in Spain. Hepburn had not been on a film set in eight years since the production of Wait Until Dark in early 1967, and was now 46 years old. According to some personal accounts, Hepburn was very self conscious of how she appeared on screen, as she had been away from acting for nearly a decade and didn’t know how her more mature face would be perceived on camera. For her, Robin And Marian is notable for being the first movie where she portrays a character of her actual age, with Marian's character age even being a few years older than Hepburn's at the time. In her first appearance on The Tonight Show Starring Johnny Carson on 30 March 1976 to promote the film, Hepburn revealed filming occurred over the course of only seven weeks due to advances in how pictures were made.

== Reception ==
The film generally received positive reviews by critics on its release. On the review aggregator website Rotten Tomatoes, 73% of 37 critics' reviews are positive, with an average rating of 6.7/10. The website's consensus reads: "Robin and Marian gives the legendary characters a somber sendoff, finding ample success in the romantic chemistry between Sean Connery and Audrey Hepburn while yielding diminishing returns in its attempts at relevant satire."

Roger Ebert was positive towards Connery and Hepburn as Robin and Marian, although he was uncertain about "history repeating itself" in regard to the plot. According to Ebert, "What prevents the movie from really losing its way, though, are the performances of Sean Connery and Audrey Hepburn in the title roles. No matter what the director and the writer may think, Connery and Hepburn seem to have arrived at a tacit understanding between themselves about their characters. They glow. They really do seem in love. And they project as marvelously complex, fond, tender people; the passage of 20 years has given them grace and wisdom." He also approved of the film's cinematography when compared to early films of the genre, noting that "Lester photographs them with more restraint than he might have used 10 years ago. His active camera is replaced here by a visual tempo more suited to bittersweet nostalgia. He photographs Sherwood Forest and its characters with a nice off-hand realism that's better than the pretentious solemnity we sometimes get in historical pictures". Time Out also gave the film a positive review. Time Out stated "There are quite a few typical Lester gags on the fringes of its tale...but the movie is conceived and executed in an elegiac key (not unlike Siegel's The Shootist), and played with an unfashionable depth of feeling (especially by Connery and Hepburn, both terrific)".

The film is recognized by American Film Institute in these lists:

- 2002: AFI's 100 Years ... 100 Passions – Nominated

== See also ==
- List of films and television series featuring Robin Hood
- List of adventure films of the 1970s
- List of American films of 1976
- List of historical drama films
