= Malcolm Douglas (documentary maker) =

Australian filmmaker

- Born: 14 March 1941; Beechworth, Victoria
- Died: 23 September 2010 (aged 69); Broome, Western Australia
- Occupations: Crocodile hunter/farmer, television presenter
- Known for: Bushcraft
- Spouse: Valerie
- Children: 2

Malcolm Douglas (14 March 1941 – 23 September 2010) was an Australian wildlife documentary film maker, and crocodile hunter. Douglas started in the 1960s as a professional crocodile hunter and farmer, but later dedicated himself to their preservation.

== Biography ==
In 1964, 23-year-old Malcolm Douglas and his friend David Oldmeadow ditched their jobs as stock and station agents in the Riverina region of New South Wales and set off on a six-month trip around Australia. Six months turned into four years. It was a journey that shaped Douglas' future. As the pair travelled and explored, they filmed their adventures. The film later turned into the documentary Across the Top, which still holds the rating record for a documentary on Australian television. He went on to produce more than 50 documentaries and films for Channel Seven and Channel Nine. Filmed in 2008, his last documentary series, the six-part In The Bush With Malcolm Douglas aired in 2009 on Seven to high ratings on Saturday nights, winning its timeslot in four out of the six weeks.

On 23 September 2010, Douglas was killed in a car accident at his Wilderness Park, 16 kilometres (9.9 mi) north of Broome, Western Australia. Douglas was found crushed between his vehicle and a tree; in reports, police emphasised that his death was not suspicious but are unsure of the cause of the accident.

Previously Douglas had battled prostate cancer. Douglas was survived by his wife, Valerie, and their two adult children.

== Crocodile Park ==
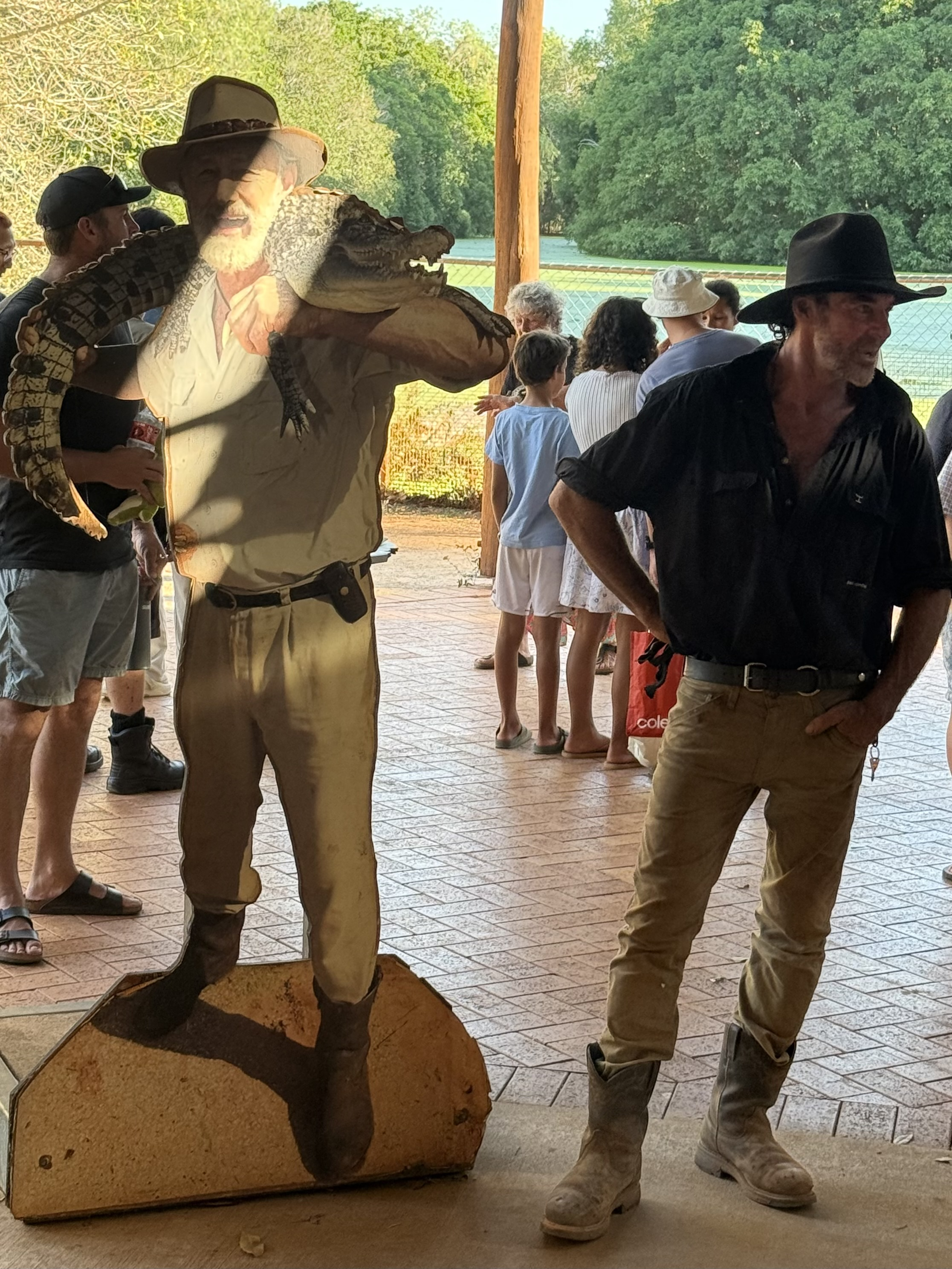
Staff member (right) at Malcolm Douglas Crocodile Park in Broome standing next to a sign/feature of Malcolm Douglas, September 2025

Established in 1983 in Broome, Western Australia, the Malcolm Douglas Crocodile Park holds 30 adult crocodiles that have been captured in the wild after threatening humans.

The park is home to Fatso, a saltwater crocodile who on 12 July 2010 bit a Melbourne man, Michael Newman, who climbed into his enclosure. Newman, who was ejected from a nearby pub called Divers Tavern earlier that night for being overly drunk, scaled the barbed wire fence surrounding Fatso's enclosure and attempted to sit on the crocodile's back. Fatso bit Newman on his right leg, and Newman subsequently escaped the enclosure and returned to Divers Tavern. Mark Phillips, the manager of the pub, noted that Newman had pieces of tree bark hanging off him and chunks of flesh missing from his leg. Newman was given a beer and ordered an ambulance, and was taken to Broome Hospital, where he received dozens of stitches to his leg. Douglas called Newman "fortunate", stating that "Fatso was a bit more sluggish than normal due to the cooler nights we have been experiencing in Broome. If it had been warmer and Fatso was more alert, we would have been dealing with a fatality." Fatso had arrived at the park in the 1990s after having been removed from the Victoria River near Timber Creek, Northern Territory.

== TV programmes ==
Series:

- Across the Top
- Follow the Sun
- Beyond the Kimberley Coast
- The Last of a Tribe
- Return to the Top
- North to Niugini
- Return to the Desert
- In the Bush with Malcolm Douglas & His Dog Boondie
- Life in Broome with Malcolm Douglas
- Survival in the Outback with Malcolm Douglas
- Kayaks in the Kimberley with Malcolm Douglas
- Along the tracks with Malcolm Douglas
- Around Australia with Malcolm Douglas
- Kimberley Adventure with Malcolm Douglas
- Malcolm Douglas Living with Crocodiles
- Travelling True North with Malcolm Douglas
- Catching Crocodiles with Malcolm Douglas
- Journey into Yesterday with Malcolm Douglas
- Bass Strait Adventure with Malcolm Douglas
- The Canning Stock Route with Malcolm Douglas
- The Pearling Coast with Malcolm Douglas
- Kakadu to the Kimberley with Malcolm Douglas
- The Macquarie Marshes with Malcolm Douglas
- Journey to Biggie Island with Malcolm Douglas
- Across the Top Again with Malcolm Douglas
- Crossing the Bar with Malcolm Douglas
- West of the Rock with Malcolm Douglas
- My Country the Kimberley with Malcolm Douglas
- In Search of the Big Barra with Malcolm Douglas
- The Gibb River Road and Beyond with Malcolm Douglas
- Land of the Long Canoes
- Islands of Arnhem Land
- One Summer
- A season of Snow
- The Big River Adventure
- Canoes in the Kimberley with Malcolm Douglas
- Over the range with Malcolm Douglas
- One Wet Season with Malcolm Douglas
- Men of the Desert with Malcolm Douglas
- North from Broome with Malcolm Douglas
- The Wild North West with Malcolm Douglas
- The Coral Coast with Malcolm Douglas
- Broome and Beyond with Malcolm Douglas
- Malcolm Douglas In the Bush

== See also ==
- Bushfood
- Alby Mangels
- Leyland brothers
- Les Hiddins, also known as The Bush Tucker Man
