= Remote Area Medical =

Nonprofit medical organization

- Formation: 1985; 41 years ago
- Founder: Stan Brock
- Type: 501(c)(3) organization
- Purpose: To prevent pain and alleviate suffering by providing free, quality healthcare to those in need.
- Location: Rockford, Tennessee
- Website: www.ramusa.org

Remote Area Medical (RAM) is a nonprofit provider of mobile medical clinics delivering free dental, vision, and medical care (as well as veterinary services when available) to under-served and uninsured individuals.

Founded by British philanthropist Stan Brock, it was originally conceived to treat people in the developing world, but turned its attention to those in need of health care in the United States.

== History ==
RAM was founded in 1985 by Stan Brock, who worked as an assistant to Marlin Perkins on Mutual of Omaha's Wild Kingdom. RAM's work was originally confined to developing countries, but it later shifted toward the United States. Today RAM works domestic operations throughout the United States and internationally when need arises.

The 2017 RAM clinic in Wise, Virginia hosted more than 1,000 volunteers and served 2,300 men and women. The RAM clinic was recognized as the nation's largest pop-up free clinic in 2017.

RAM completed its 900th clinic in Knoxville, Tennessee, in 2018, and its 1,000th clinic in Knoxville, Tennessee in 2019.

RAM clinics were featured in an episode of 60 Minutes that was broadcast on CBS television stations.

== Headquarters ==
On March 31, 2014, the Remote Area Medical headquarters moved from an old school building in Knox County, Tennessee to the previous Henniges Automotive facility in Blount County, Tennessee. The former school building was used by RAM for 19 years and was rented by the organization for $1-a-year from Knox County.

== Funding ==
RAM is funded through donations and relies on volunteers from the community, as well as professionals including physicians, dentists, optometrists, nurses, pilots, and veterinarians to provide care in poorer communities.

== Animal services ==
Since 1985, the Remote Area Medical Veterinary Program has provided animal health services to those who lived in underserved, impoverished, and isolated communities.

== Disaster relief ==
The Remote Area Medical Disaster Relief arm responds to disasters by land, sea, and air, delivering medical relief and other humanitarian aid when needed.

== Related legislation ==
In 2017, then United States Rep. John J. Duncan Jr., R-Knoxville, filed a federal bill that would provide $1 million to any state that allows licensed medical professionals to travel from other states and to offer their services to those in need. The money would be a one-time allocation with the intent to help states pay any costs associated with allowing outside medical personnel to volunteer within their borders. The legislation, called the Healthier Act, specifies that out-of-state medical personnel only could work at weekend clinics. That specification was intended to prevent them from moving into a state and setting up a permanent or semi-permanent practice.
