= List of horror films of 1977 =

A list of horror films released in 1977.

Title	Director(s)	Cast	Country	Notes	Ref.
Alucarda	Juan López Moctezuma	Tina Romero, Susana Kamini, Claudio Brook	Mexico		
Audrey Rose	Robert Wise	Marsha Mason, Anthony Hopkins, John Beck	United States		
The Car	Elliot Silverstein	James Brolin, Kathleen Lloyd, John Marley	United States		
Cathy's Curse	Eddy Matalon	Alan Scarfe, Beverly Murray	Canada; France		
The Child	Robert Voskanian	Laurel Barnett, Rosalie Cole, Frank Janson	United States	Alternative title(s): Kill and Go Hide; Zombie Child	
Count Dracula	Philip Saville, Gerald Savory	Judi Bowker, Mark Burns	United Kingdom	Television film	
Curse of the Black Widow	Dan Curtis	Anthony Franciosa, Donna Mills, Patty Duke	United States	Television film Alternative title(s): Love Trap	
Day of the Animals	William Girdler	Leslie Nielsen, Lynda Day George, Jon Cedar	United States		
Death Bed: The Bed That Eats	George Barry	Linda Bond, Demene Hall, Julie Ritter	United States		
The Demon Lover	Donald G. Jackson, Jerry Younkins	Val Mayerik, Gunnar Hansen, Carol Lasowski	United States		
Demon Seed	Donald Cammell	Julie Christie, Fritz Weaver, Gerritt Graham	United States		
Empire of the Ants	Bert I. Gordon	Joan Collins, Robert Lansing, John David Carson	United States	Alternative title(s): H.G. Wells' Empire of the Ants	
Eraserhead	David Lynch	Jack Nance, Charlotte Stewart	United States		
Exorcist II: The Heretic	John Boorman	Linda Blair, Richard Burton, Louise Fletcher	United States	Second film of The Exorcist franchise	
Full Circle	Richard Loncraine	Mia Farrow, Anna Wing, Sophie Ward	Canada; United Kingdom	Alternative title(s): The Haunting of Julia	
Good Against Evil	Paul Wendkos	Kim Cattrall, Elyssa Davalos	United States	Television film	
The Hills Have Eyes	Wes Craven	Susan Lanier, Robert Houston, Virginia Vincent	United States		
House	Nobuhiko Obayashi	Kimiko Ikegami, Kumiko Ohba, Yôko Minamida	Japan		
The Incredible Melting Man	William Sachs	Alex Rebar, Burr DeBenning, Myron Healey	United States		
It Happened at Lakewood Manor	Robert Scheerer	Suzanne Somers, Lynda Day George, Myrna Loy	United States	Television film Alternative title(s): Ants!; Panic at Lakewood Manor	
Kingdom of the Spiders	John Cardos	William Shatner, Tiffany Bolling, Woody Strode	United States		
Last Cannibal World	Ruggero Deodato	Massimo Foschi, Ivan Rassimov	Italy	Alternative title(s): Cannibal; Carnivorous; The Last Survivor; Jungle Holocaust	
Maligno	Celso Ad. Castillo	Susan Roces, Dante Rivero, Celia Rodriguez, Eddie Garcia	Philippines		
Orca: The Killer Whale	Michael Anderson	Richard Harris, Charlotte Rampling	United States		
The Pack	Robert Clouse	Joe Don Baker, Hope Alexander-Willis, R.G. Armstrong	United States		
The Possessed	Jerry Thorpe	James Farentino, Joan Hackett, Harrison Ford	United States	Television film	
Prey	Norman J. Warren	Barry Stokes, Glory Annen, Sally Faulkner	United Kingdom		
The Psychic	Lucio Fulci	Jennifer O'Neill, Gabriele Ferzetti, Marc Porel	Italy	Alternative title(s): Murder to the Tune of the Seven Black Notes; Sette note in nero	
Rabid	David Cronenberg	Marilyn Chambers, Frank Moore	Canada		
Return to Boggy Creek	Tom Moore	Dawn Wells, Dana Plato	United States		
Rituals	Peter Carter	Hal Holbrook, Lawrence Dane, Robin Gammell	Canadian	Alternative title(s): The Creeper	
Ruby	Curtis Harrington	Piper Laurie, Stuart Whitman, Roger Davis	United States		
Satan's Cheerleaders	Greydon Clark	Yvonne De Carlo, Robin Greer, John Carradine	United States		
The Sentinel	Michael Winner	Chris Sarandon, Cristina Raines, Martin Balsam	United States		
Shock	Mario Bava	David Colin, Jr., Daria Nicolodi	Italy	Alternative title(s): Beyond the Door II; Suspense	
Shock Waves	Ken Wiederhorn	Peter Cushing, Brooke Adams, Fred Buch	United States	Alternative title(s): Almost Human; Death Corps	
Spectre	Clive Donner	Robert Culp, Gig Young, John Hurt	United Kingdom	Television film	
The Spell	Lee Philips	Lee Grant, Susan Myers, Lelia Goldoni	United States	Television film	
The Strange Possession of Mrs. Oliver	Gordon Hessler	Karen Black, George Hamilton, Robert F. Lyons	United States	Television film	
Suspiria	Dario Argento	Jessica Harper, Stefania Casini, Joan Bennett	Italy		
Tentacles	Ovidio G. Assonitis	John Huston, Shelley Winters, Bo Hopkins	Italy; United States		
Tintorera	René Cardona Jr.	Hugo Stiglitz, Andrés García, Fiona Lewis	Mexico		
The Uncanny	Denis Héroux	Catherine Begin	Canada; United Kingdom		
Watch Me When I Kill	Antonio Bido	Franco Citti, Fernando Cerulli, Sylvia Kramer	Italy		
Whiskey Mountain	William Grefé	Christopher George, Preston Pierce, Roberta Collins	United States		

== Sources ==
- Albright, Brian (2012). Regional Horror Films, 1958-1990: A State-by-State Guide with Interviews. Jefferson, North Carolina: McFarland. ISBN 978-1-476-60042-0.
- Chibnall, Steve; Petley, Julian, eds. (2002). British Horror Cinema. New York City, New York: Routledge. ISBN 978-0-415-23003-2.
- Deal, David (2007). Television Fright Films of the 1970s. Jefferson, North Carolina: McFarland. ISBN 978-0-786-42929-5.
- Hardy, Phil, ed. (1995). The Overlook Film Encyclopedia. Vol. 3. Overlook Press. ISBN 0-87951-624-0.
- Hutchings, Peter (2009). The A to Z of Horror Cinema. Lanham, Maryland: Scarecrow Press. ISBN 978-0-810-87050-5.
- Muir, John Kenneth (2007). Horror Films of the 1970s. Jefferson, North Carolina: McFarland. ISBN 978-0-786-49156-8.
- Young, R. G. (2000). The Encyclopedia of Fantastic Film: Ali Baba to Zombies. New York City, New York: Hal Leonard Corporation. ISBN 1-55783-269-2.
