= Susan Backlinie =

American actress and stuntwoman (1946–2024)

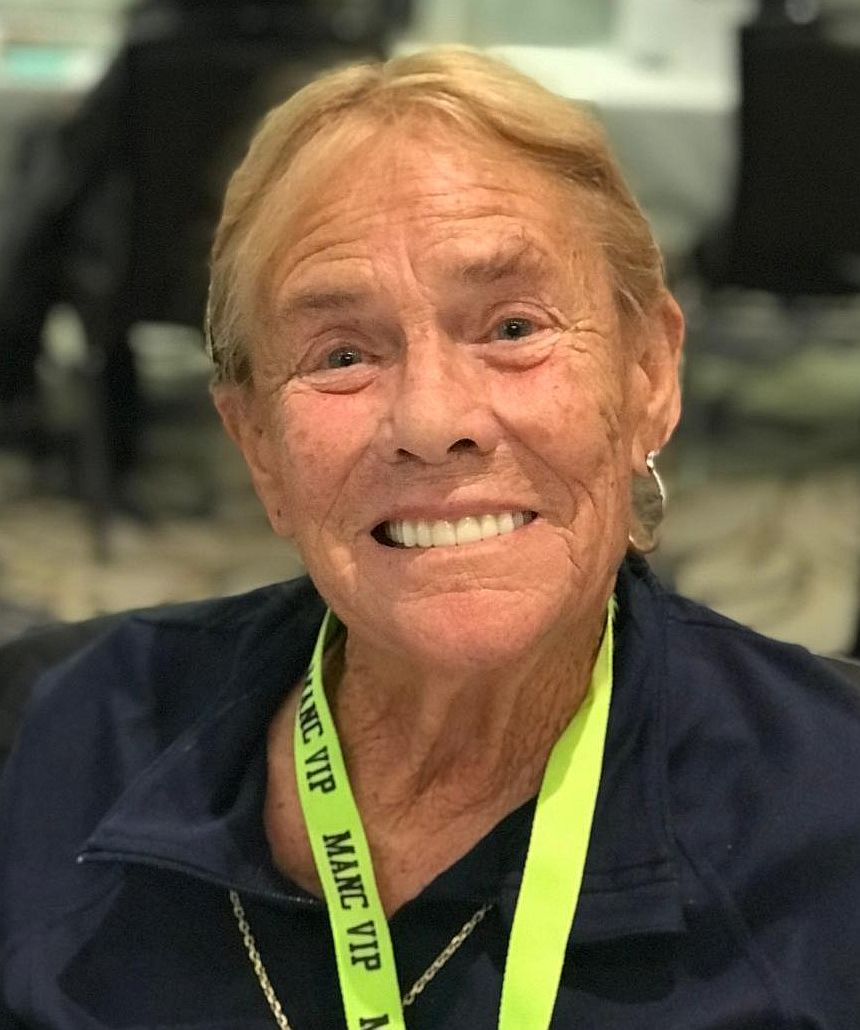
- Backlinie in 2023
- Born: Susan Jane Myers; September 1, 1946; Miami, Florida, U.S
- Died: May 11, 2024 (aged 77); Ventura, California, U.S.
- Occupations: Actress; stuntwoman
- Years active: 1960–1982
- Notable work: Christine "Chrissie" Watkins in Jaws (1975)
- Spouses: Henry Backlinie (m. 1966) Harvey Swindall (m. 1995)
- Children: 1

Susan Jane Backlinie (September 1, 1946 – May 11, 2024) was an American actress and stuntwoman. She was known for playing Chrissie Watkins, the shark attack victim in the opening beach party scene of Steven Spielberg's 1975 film Jaws.

== Early life ==
Susan Jane Myers was born in Miami on September 1, 1946; some sources say she was a native of Washington, D.C. From the age of ten, Backlinie lived in West Palm Beach, Florida, where she swam for miles off the coast and in local pools. At Forest Hill High School, she was a cheerleader and a state freestyle swimming champion; she graduated in 1964. After high school she attended nursing school for a year, but she wanted a more adventurous outdoor life.

As a teenager she performed as a mermaid at Weeki Wachee Springs State Park, a tourist attraction on Florida's west coast; later she worked with wild animals at Ivan Tors Studios, the Miami facility made famous by Flipper. On a national tour with Ivan, she shared a stage with Gentle Ben the bear, Judy the Chimp, and Clarence, the Cross-Eyed Lion. When Ivan Tors closed, Backlinie now in her early 20s, relocated to Africa USA, a wild animal park operated by Ralph Helfer who specialized in training animals for movies.

== Career ==
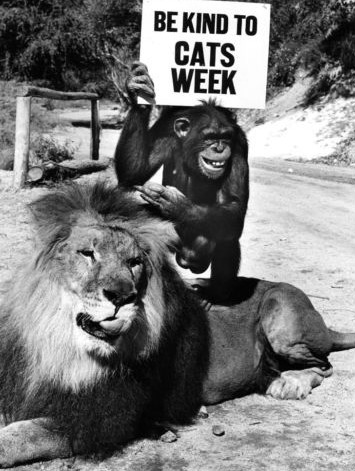
Clarence the Lion, and Judy the Chimp, who Backlinie worked with as a trainer in the early 1970s.

In the early 1970s, when she was 23 years old, Backlinie was working at Africa USA, riding on the back of a 300-lb water-skiing lion named Zamba (also an animal actor). This led to a topless pictorial with Zamba, "The Lady and the Lion", in the January 1973 issue of Penthouse. She also appeared nude in the February 1977 issue of Mayfair. As a stuntwoman, she played a dead prostitute floating down the river in The Blue Knight (1973), and was seen in a falling elevator in The Towering Inferno (1974).

In 1974, she was working as an extra for a casting agency when a request came in for someone who was willing to work in the nude and who was a good swimmer in the ocean. Backlinie submitted a nude photo of herself and she was brought to the attention of director Steven Spielberg. Backlinie pitched her beauty, "If you use me, you could get close-ups during the stunt itself. If you use an actress, she’ll have to hide her face." She was hired, and Backlinie's scene in Jaws took three days to shoot. Attached to her cut-off jeans were metal plates that anchored ropes pulled by groups of men in opposite directions, giving the appearance of being dragged by an unseen force underwater. Other than flippers to help her, she stayed afloat only by the strength of her swimming.

Spielberg calls Backlinie's sequence "one of the most dangerous" stunts he's ever directed: “She was actually being tugged left and right by 10 men on one rope and 10 men on the other back to the shore, and that's what caused her to move like that." Her screams were recorded later in the studio. She recounted that "Spielberg sat me in a chair… and he poured water down my throat." When Jaws co-star Richard Dreyfuss saw a daily of her performance, he told her it absolutely terrified him. The iconic scene opens the film. Although the movie poster shows the character of Chrissie, Susan is not the one depicted. The painting was originally the book cover art by Roger Kastel, who hired a 24-year-old model named Allison Maher.

Backlinie was in the 1977 film Day of the Animals, regarded by some as a Jaws clone about nature gone bad. She was in Spielberg's 1979 film 1941, parodying her role in Jaws: Instead of being attacked by a shark during a midnight swim, she is "picked up" by the periscope of a Japanese submarine. The scene has been described as the best joke in what is otherwise widely considered one of Spielberg's least successful films. She danced a water ballet with Miss Piggy in The Great Muppet Caper (1981).

== Personal life and death ==
She was married twice, first in 1966 to Henry Backlinie, a ranch foreman, and again in 1996 to Harvey Swindall. She had a daughter. Later in life she was a computer accountant. She was a popular presence at "JawsFest" events, and enjoyed scuba diving, including on the coast of Australia, where she fearlessly swam with sharks.

She died from a heart attack at her home in Ventura, California, on May 11, 2024, at the age of 77.

== Filmography ==
Film
Year	Film	Role	Notes
1975	Jaws	Chrissie Watkins	
1975	The Grizzly and the Treasure	Eve	
1976	A Stranger in My Forest	Susan	also Trainer
1976	Two-Minute Warning	Pretty blonde woman in crowd	Uncredited
1977	Day of the Animals	Mandy Young	
1979	The Villain	n/a	Stunt performer
1979	1941	Polar Bear Woman	
1981	Image of the Beast	n/a	Stunt performer
1981	The Great Muppet Caper	Charkie's Water Ballet Performer	
1984	Terror in the Aisles	Chrissie Watkins	Archival footage
Television
Year	Title	Role	Notes
1976	The Quest	Girl in Brawl	1 episode
1977	The Return of the Incredible Hulk	n/a	TV film Animal Trainer
1978	Quark	Guard #1	2 episodes
1982	Catalina C-Lab	Diver With Bends	TV film
1982	The Fall Guy	Tammy	1 episode
