= The Grizzly and the Treasure =

1975 film

- Directed by: James T. Flocker
- Starring: Susan Backlinie; Scott Beach; Andre Gordon; Robert Sheble
- Music by: William Loose
- Release date: 1975
- Running time: 88 minutes
- Language: English

The Grizzly and the Treasure is a 1975 film. It is narrated by an elderly man (Scott Beach) with the accent of an old woodsman or prospector of 19th-century gold rushes, much in the same style as early Disney nature specials.

== Plot ==
Set in 1898, the movie follows Ezra Lambert and his family as they travel from Sacramento to the Yukon gold country in search of riches. Problems arise when Ezra is injured by a grizzly bear, forcing his young son to set out in search of help.
