= Alby Mangels =

Australian adventurer and filmmaker (born 1948)

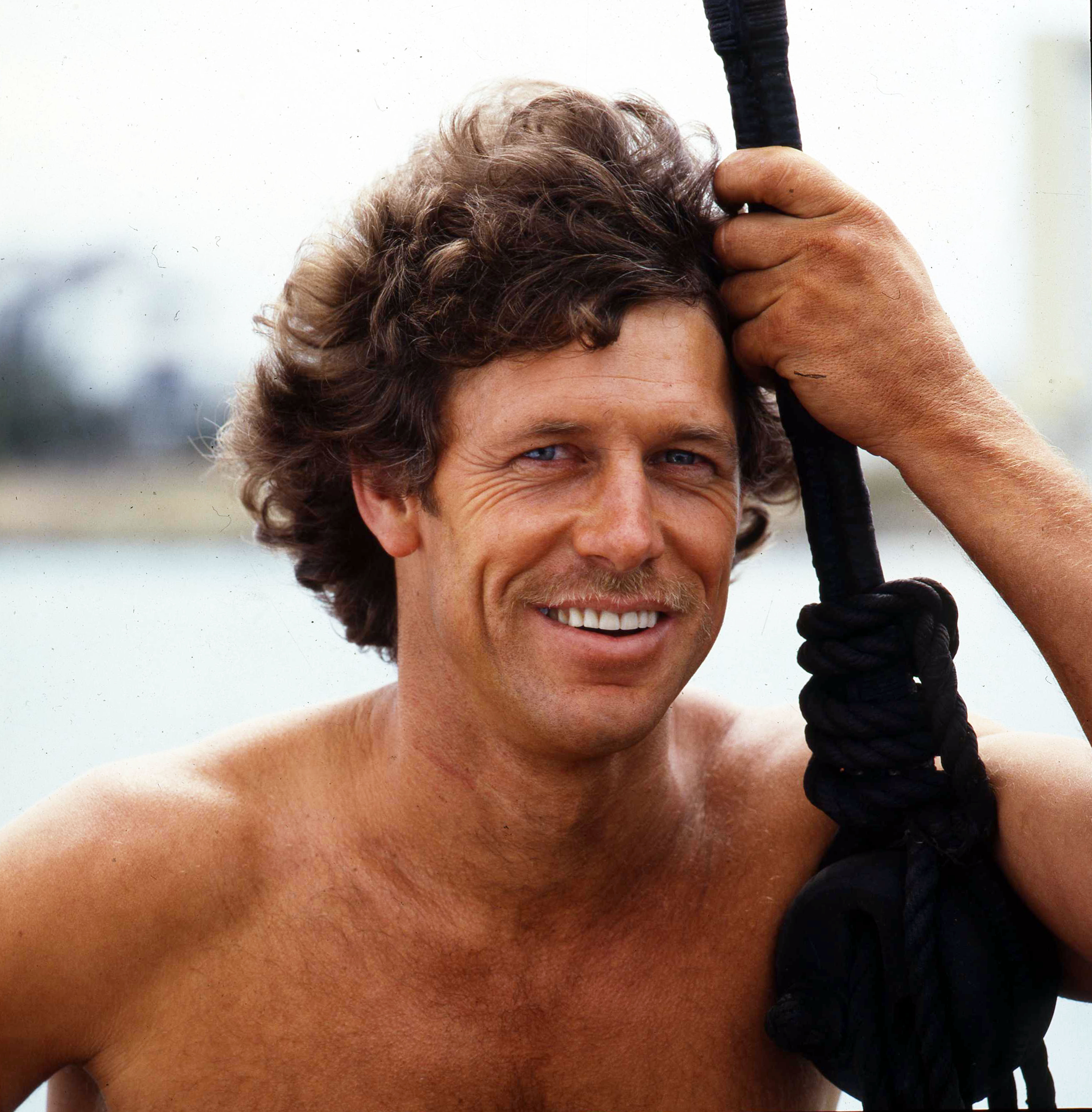
- Mangels in Cleo magazine, 1985
- Born: 16 November 1948 (age 77); Netherlands
- Occupations: Adventurer, documentary filmmaker
- Known for: World Safari films
- Parents: Johannes Mangels (father); Adrianna (mother)

Zwier Albertus "Alby" Mangels (born 16 November 1948) is an Australian adventurer and documentary filmmaker widely remembered for his World Safari adventure travel films (World Safari, World Safari II and World Safari III).

== Early life and education ==
Zwier Albertus Mangels was born in the Netherlands on 16 November 1948. His father Johannes (Jos) was a leather tanner. The family moved to Australia in 1955, where they settled in Mount Burr, South Australia. After about eighteen months his parents separated after his mother, Adrianna, moved out with the lodger, taking Alby and his sister with her. They settled in Murray Bridge, but the relationship was a bad one. Adrianna developed cancer when Alby was around 16, and he spent several years caring for her before her death.

Mangels left school at 13 or 14, and as a teenager, undertook a wide variety of jobs, including chicken farming and house construction.

== Travel and filming ==
=== World Safari ===
Inspired by filmmaker Malcolm Douglas and the Leyland brothers, Mangels set off in 1971 with his friend John Fields, after buying a 16 mm camera from a filmmaking friend, Jack Hume, in Adelaide. Leaving Murray Bridge, they first headed north to Darwin. After reading about a 120-year-old Swedish ketch called Klaraborg about to sail from Sydney, they headed there and joined the crew. They sailed across the Pacific, visiting many islands on the way, to Guam. They also went to Japan, crossed India by train, sailed to Mombasa, drove down to Johannesburg, South Africa, where they worked for three months, then drove up through Africa to the Netherlands in a little two-cylinder Dutch car, the Daf, filming all the way. The Daf ended up in a museum in Eindhoven. Their journey took them across four continents, travelling 120,000 km (75,000 mi) through 56 countries over six years. The film was produced entirelly in South Australia.

After arriving in London, Mangels took the film to the BBC, but they were not interested. Back in Australia, it was similarly rebuffed by the Australian Film Commission and the South Australian Film Corporation. He was going to start travelling again, but after one of his crew members was injured and needed treatment in Melbourne, he started screening a roughly edited copy around schools, titled Happy Go Lucky Highway. On 10 July 1977, a two-hour version edited by Jack Hume under this title screened at the Dendy in Crow's Nest, Sydney, at which time it was reported that the film was enjoying success in Melbourne. Andrew Ward of the Brighton Cinema in Brighton, Victoria, which specialised in art-house and adventure films, saw potential in the film. Under his guidance, they changed the title of the film to World Safari and screened it in small regional towns, where it proved highly popular.

=== World Safari II ===
Mangels and John worked as bricklayers in Brisbane, and bought an unfinished boat, the Gretta Marie, built from gum in the style of traditional North Sea fishing boats. After sailing the boat down to Port Adelaide and then back up the coast to Sydney, they looked for crew of four to sail to the Solomon Islands. He also intended to sail to South-East Asia, through the Suez Canal, and up both the Nile and Amazon Rivers.

Andrew Ward suggested that he recruit a model called Judy Green, whom he had spotted on TV on Sale of the Century, for his next film, and they started filming World Safari II on Mer Island in the Torres Strait. At some point during filming, Mangels not only lost the Gretta Marie, but, also, his friend and cameraman Piers Souter was paralysed and later died as a result of a fall in the water.

Mangels and Green set off for Brazil with Mike Stent to shoot there. However, in April 1983 they were all injured when their Jeep collided with a bus in Manaus, Green sustaining critical head injuries. They were also robbed of their traveller's cheques while lying injured in the vehicle. After discharge from hospital, they flew back to Australia for treatment. Mangels took a year to recover, but Green did not rejoin him, as she had serious head injuries and needed to regain the ability to walk. (Note: Green spent three weeks in a hospital in Caracas, Venezuela, where she was unconscious for two days. She recovered the ability to walk more rapidly than expected by doctors, and returned to modelling work, appearing first on The Don Lane Show and then, by January 1985, on Sale of the Century again.) Mangels hired cinematographer Geoffrey Hall, who joined him in South America to make the rest of World Safari II: The Final Adventure, which featured a lot of female companions in bikinis, which was unremarkable at the time. World Safari II did not impress film critics, despite its higher production values, but did even better at the box office than the first film, even outselling Ghostbusters on its Australian release in 1986. It won Best Family Film of the Year at the 1986 Los Angeles Film Festival.

=== World Safari III ===
Mangels sunk much of his newly accumulated wealth into another sequel. At its screening in Victor Harbor Town Hall in December 1989, Escape: World Safari III was described as a compilation of film shot in Africa, Australia and New Zealand in the preceding four years. The film also screened at a Canberra cinema in January, but it flopped at the box office, and he lost everything, and could not even pay his staff. Channel 9 serialised World Safari 2 to coincide with the release. The network also ran a story on 60 Minutes featuring former employees complaining about their lack of payment, and another on A Current Affair that revealed that some of his footage was faked (which he later called "a little bit of poetic licence"). Mangels was devastated at the animosity expressed by the media.

He retreated from the spotlight and lived as a recluse for a while, but carried on working.

=== 1990s resurgence ===
In the 1990s, Mangels' films were discovered by a new market, on The Travel Channel in the US. He made 70 films in all for a series called Adventure Bound, which proved highly successful. In 1999 the Travel Channel commissioned a new series, which ran for three years and attracted many new American fans until 2002.

In 2011 it was reported that he had made over 80 adventure documentaries, mainly for overseas cable networks. He regarded his later work for television as better than his earlier films.

=== 2020s ===
After living a quiet life for around 20 years, Mangels acquired a new manager, Roman Kondratiuk, and who has assisted in remastering 65 of his films for re-release. In February 2026, he featured on ABC Television's Australian Story.

== Biographies ==
A companion book to the films, Alby Mangels' World Safari, written by Adelaide author Marie Appleton, was published in 1986.

Lynn Santer authored Mangels's authorised biography Beyond World Safari in 2007.

== Personal life ==
Mangels became a naturalised Australian citizen in December 1968.

Mangels has a sister called Maria Snell. After the death of his friend and cameraman Piers Souter, Mangels and his sister founded a foundation for disabled people, which in 1983 won the Australian Design Award for a revolutionary wheelchair.

After the success of World Safari II in 1984, Mangels bought an 80-kilometre (50 mi) piece of beachfront land on the Eyre Peninsula, intending to create a wildlife sanctuary. He also bought a plane, helicopter and boat. He posed nude for Cleo magazine twice.

In 1984, Mangels was living in Lane Cove, Sydney, but had a licence to occupy Crown land in the Hundred of Coonarie in South Australia.

In 1991, Mangels owned land on the Yorke Peninsula in South Australia.

He did not marry or have children, but in 2011 described himself as "part of a warm, close, and loving family by being involved with my brother, sister, nieces and nephews".
