= Escape from Angola =

- Directed by: Leslie H. Martinson
- Starring: Stan Brock
- Release date: December 1976
- Running time: 110 min.
- Countries: United States; South Africa
- Language: English

Escape from Angola is a 1976 adventure film directed by Leslie H. Martinson. It stars Stan Brock and Anne Collings and was co-produced by Ivan Tors whose children act in the film with Ivan making a cameo appearance. According to the film all the animal catching scenes were filmed during actual conditions when the rare animals had to be rounded up and relocated in safer areas.

== Plot ==
In an unnamed African country the Mallory family devotes their life to animal conservation. A terrorist group called the GVN seek to destroy a dam providing power and chase out another animal conservationist. When their Land Rover is sabotaged the Mallory family goes their separate ways to safety.

== Cast ==
- Stan Brock as James Mallory
- Anne Collings as Karen Mallory
- Steven Tors as Steve Mallory
- Peter Tors as Peter Mallory
- David Tors as Dave Mallory
- Ivan Tors as Lars Olaffson
- Mackson Ngobeni as Tshoma
- Shirley Pelle as Ogamo Woman
- Jannie Wienand as Kruse
- Joe Mafela as Patrol Leader
