= List of horror films of 1979 =

A list of horror films released in 1979.

Title	Director(s)	Cast	Country	Notes	Ref.
Alien	Ridley Scott	Sigourney Weaver, Tom Skerritt, Veronica Cartwright	United Kingdom; United States	First film of Alien franchise	
The Amityville Horror	Stuart Rosenberg	James Brolin, Margot Kidder, Rod Steiger	United States		
Angel Guts: Red Classroom	Chūsei Sone		Japan		
Beyond the Darkness	Joe D'Amato	Cinzia Monreale	Italy		
Bloodrage	Joseph Zito	Ian Scott, Judith-Marie Bergan	United States	Alternative title(s): Never Pick Up a Stranger	
Bog	Don Keeslar	Gloria DeHaven, Aldo Ray	United States		
The Brood	David Cronenberg	Oliver Reed, Samantha Eggar	Canada		
The Butterfly Murders	Tsui Hark	Lau Siu-Ming, Eddy Ko	Hong Kong		
The Dark	John Cardos	William Devane, Cathy Lee Crosby, Richard Jaeckel	United States		
The Dogs	Alain Jessua	Gérard Depardieu, Victor Lanoux, Nicole Calfan	France		
Dominique	Michael Anderson	Cliff Robertson, Jean Simmons, Jenny Agutter	United Kingdom	Alternative title(s): Dominique is Dead	
Dracula	John Badham	Frank Langella, Laurence Olivier, Donald Pleasence	United Kingdom; United States		
The Driller Killer	Abel Ferrara	Jimmy Laine, Carolyn Marz, Baybi Day	United States		
The Evictors	Charles B. Pierce	Vic Morrow, Michael Parks, Jessica Harper	United States		
Fascination	Jean Rollin	Franca Mai, Brigitte Lahaie, Jean-Marie Lemaire	France		
Human Experiments	Gregory Goodell	Ellen Travolta, Linda Haynes	United States	Alternative title(s): Beyond The Gate; Women In Prison	
Killer Fish	Antonio Margheriti	Lee Majors, Marisa Berenson, Karen Black	Brazil; Italy; United Kingdom; United States		
Murder by Decree	Bob Clark	Christopher Plummer, Donald Sutherland, John Gielgud	United Kingdom		
Nightwing	Arthur Hiller	Nick Mancuso, David Warner, Kathryn Harrold	United States		
Nosferatu the Vampyre	Werner Herzog	Klaus Kinski, Isabelle Adjani	West Germany; France		
Phantasm	Don Coscarelli	A. Michael Baldwin, Bill Thornbury, Reggie Bannister	United States	First film of Phantasm film series	
Prophecy	John Frankenheimer	Talia Shire, Robert Foxworth, Armand Assante	United States		
Screams of a Winter Night	James L. Wilson	Matt Borel, Gil Glasgow, Patrick Byers	United States		
The Silent Scream	Denny Harris	Rebecca Balding, Barbara Steele, Yvonne De Carlo	United States		
Thirst	Rod Hardy	Chantal Contouri, David Hemmings, Henry Silva	Australia		
Tourist Trap	David Schmoeller	Chuck Connors, Jocelyn Jones, Tanya Roberts	United States		
Up From the Depths	Charles B. Griffith	Sam Bottoms, Susanne Reed, Virgil Frye	Philippines; United States		
The Visitor	Giulio Paradisi	Paige Conner, Kareem Abdul-Jabbar, Franco Nero	Italy; United States		
When a Stranger Calls	Fred Walton	Carol Kane, Colleen Dewhurst, Charles Durning	United States		
Wolfman	Worth Keeter	Earl Owensby, Kristina Reynolds, Julian Morton	United States		
Zombi 2	Lucio Fulci	Tisa Farrow, Ian McCulloch, Richard Johnson	Italy	Alternative title(s): Zombie; Island of the Living Dead; Zombie 2: The Dead Are Among Us; Zombie Flesh Eaters	
Zombie Holocaust	Francesco Martino	Ian McCulloch, Alexandra Cole, Sherry Buchanan	Italy		

== Sources ==
- Albright, Brian (2012). Regional Horror Films, 1958-1990: A State-by-State Guide with Interviews. Jefferson, North Carolina: McFarland. ISBN 978-1-476-60042-0.
- Browning, John Edgar (2010). Dracula in Visual Media: Film, Television, Comic Book and Electronic Game Appearances, 1921–2010. McFarland. ISBN 978-0-7864-3365-0.
- Chibnall, Steve; Petley, Julian, eds. (2002). British Horror Cinema. New York City, New York: Routledge. ISBN 978-0-415-23003-2.
- Deal, David (2007). Television Fright Films of the 1970s. Jefferson, North Carolina: McFarland. ISBN 978-0-786-42929-5.
- Hardy, Phil, ed. (1995). The Overlook Film Encyclopedia. Vol. 3. Overlook Press. ISBN 0-87951-624-0.
- Hirschhorn, Clive (2000). The Universal Story. London, England: Hamlyn. ISBN 978-0-600-59736-0.
- Hutchings, Peter (2009). The A to Z of Horror Cinema. Lanham, Maryland: Scarecrow Press. ISBN 978-0-810-87050-5.
- Meyers, Ric (2011) [1983]. For One Week Only: The World of Exploitation Films. Guildford, Connecticut: Emery Books. ISBN 978-0-979-99893-5.
- Muir, John Kenneth (2007). Horror Films of the 1970s. Jefferson, North Carolina: McFarland. ISBN 978-0-786-49156-8.
- Nowell, Richard (2011). Blood Money: A History of the First Teen Slasher Film Cycle. New York City, New York: Continuum. ISBN 978-1-441-18850-2.
- Stine, Scott Aaron (2015). The Gorehound's Guide to Splatter Films of the 1960s and 1970s. Jefferson, North Carolina: McFarland. ISBN 978-0-786-49140-7.
- Thrower, Stephen (2007). Nightmare USA: The Untold Story of the Exploitation Independents. London, England: FAB Press. ISBN 978-1-903-25446-2.
- Young, R. G. (2000). The Encyclopedia of Fantastic Film: Ali Baba to Zombies. Hal Leonard Corporation. ISBN 1-55783-269-2.
