= List of Chōgattai Majutsu Robo Ginguiser episodes =

Chōgattai Majutsu Robo Ginguiser is a Japanese mecha anime television series produced by Nippon Animation. It ran from April 9 to October 22, 1977.

== Episode list ==
No.	Title	Original release date
1	"Attack! Ginguiser"; Transliteration: "shutsudō da! gingaiza" (Japanese: 出動だ！ギンガイザー)	April 9, 1977
2	"The Sazoriano empire" Transliteration: "sazorion teikoku no Yabo" (Japanese: サゾリオン帝国の野望)	April 16, 1977
3	"Fujihama the monster" Transliteration: "deta! fuji no numbers" (Japanese: 出た!富士のヌメーラ)	April 23, 1977
4	"The bloody orca" Transliteration: "yomigatta kodai no shachi" (Japanese: 蘇った古代のシャチ)	April 30, 1977
5	"Boys in leg" Transliteration: "ganseki Maju yashaganda" (Japanese: 岩石魔獣ヤシャガンダ)	May 7, 1977
6	"The two-headed mammoth" Transliteration: "Sōtō no kodai Zo Nauma" (Japanese: 双頭の古代象ナウマー)	May 14, 1977
7	"The mysterious pearl" Transliteration: "kodai umi no kame Taton Sakebi" (Japanese: 古代海亀タートンの叫び)	May 21, 1977
8	"The tusk of the sea monster" Transliteration: "Nagare! Kenka tako" (Japanese: あがれ!ケンカ凧)	May 28, 1977
9	"Fighting kites" Transliteration: "Kaiju metorio no kiba" (Japanese: 怪獣メトリオの牙)	June 4, 1977
10	"The Bermuda Triangle"; Transliteration: "Noroi no hen genma kemono" (Japanese: 呪いの変幻魔獣)	June 18, 1977
11	"The old samurai" Transliteration: "gamarusu ennetsu jigoku" (Japanese: ガマルス炎熱地獄)	June 25, 1977
12	"Otane the medium" Transliteration: "Osorezan no Ketto" (Japanese: 恐山の決闘)	July 2, 1977
13	"SOS! Tanker"; Transliteration: "SOS! manmosutanka" (Japanese: SOS!マンモスタンカー)	July 9, 1977
14	"Thoroughbred"; Transliteration: "kyōfu no kodai kuma gurizura" (Japanese: 恐怖の古代熊グリズラー)	July 16, 1977
15	"The awakening of the mummy" Transliteration: "Miira kaijin koto ga ni shutsugen!" (Japanese: ミイラ怪人が古都に出現!)	July 23, 1977
16	"The night of cormorants" Transliteration: "Kaicho ugada hissatsu pikku" (Japanese: 怪鳥ウガーダ必殺ピック)	July 30, 1977
17	"The eagle with feathers of gold" Transliteration: "kin'iro Sosei no kemono iguron" (Japanese: 金色の蘇生獣イーグロン)	August 13, 1977
18	"Challenge to the cemetery of the monsters" Transliteration: "kessen! Sosei kemono no Hakaba" (Japanese: 決戦!蘇生獣の墓場)	August 20, 1977
19	"Ammon shell" Transliteration: "iso arashi! nama hara kai kemono" (Japanese: 磯あらし!原生貝獣)	August 27, 1977
20	"Bullfighting!"; Transliteration: "Abare mōgyū ichiban hoshi!" (Japanese: あばれ猛牛一番星!)	September 3, 1977
21	"Raid in the valley of Gemora"; Transliteration: "TKyushu island! gemora no tani" (Japanese: 急襲!ゲモラの谷)	September 10, 1977
22	"International Regatta"; Transliteration: "Honoo no nazo Kairyu" (Japanese: 謎の炎海流)	September 17, 1977
23	"The base in the forest" Transliteration: "by zaru yama no mon Jiro" (Japanese: 大ザル山の紋次郎)	October 1, 1977
24	"The last ride" Transliteration: "kyōfu no SL Bakudan" (Japanese: 爆弾SL恐怖の)	October 8, 1977
25	"Infernal trap" Transliteration: "sutemi no faiyakurassha (mae)" (Japanese: 捨て身のファイヤクラッシャー(前))	October 15, 1977
26	"The triumph of Ginguiser"; Transliteration: "sutemi no faiyakurassha (nochi)" (Japanese: 捨て身のファイヤクラッシャー(後))	October 22, 1977
