= List of animated feature films of 1977 =

This is a list of animated feature films first released in 1977.

== List ==
Title	Country	Director	Production company	Animation technique	Format	Notes	Release date	Duration
Around the World with Bolek and Lolek; Wielka podróż Bolka i Lolka (Bolek and Lolek's Great Journey)	Poland	Stanislaw Dulz; Wladyslaw Nehrebecki	Studio Filmów Rysunkowych (Bielsko-Biała)	Traditional	Theatrical	First Polish animated feature.	September 16, 1977	104 minutes
The Bruce McMouse Show	United Kingdom	Barry Chattington	MPL Communications	Traditional/Live action	Theatrical		1977	55 minutes
Bugs Bunny's Easter Special	United States	Friz Freleng	DePatie–Freleng Enterprises; Warner Bros. Television	Traditional	Television special	Compilation of theatrical animated shorts; only hour-long Looney Tunes animated television special.	April 7, 1977	50 minutes
Donald Duck's Summer Magic	United States	Jack Hannah; Jack King; Dick Huemer; Milt Schaffer	Walt Disney Productions	Traditional	Theatrical; Compilation film	Film compiled from Disney theatrical animated shorts; originally released theatrically for overseas markets and never in the United States until December 17, 1977.	July 23, 1977	75 minutes
Dot and the Kangaroo	Australia	Yoram Gross	Yoram Gross Films; Hoyts	Traditional/Live action	Theatrical; Live-action animated film		December 15, 1977	71 minutes
The Easter Bunny Is Comin' to Town	United States; Japan	Jules Bass; Arthur Rankin Jr.	Rankin/Bass Productions; Video Tokyo Production	Stop motion	Television special		April 6, 1977	50 minutes
Electronic Man 337 전자인간 337	South Korea	Lim Jung-kyu	Samdo Film Co., Ltd.	Traditional	Theatrical		December 9, 1977	65 minutes
Fantastic Animation Festival	United States	Dean A. Berko; Christopher Padilla	Voyage Productions	Traditional/Stop motion	Theatrical; Anthology film Compilation film Experimental film	Compilation of fourteen selected animated short films of varying quality and style.	May 27, 1977	91 minutes
5 Weeks in a Balloon	Australia; United States	Chris Cuddington	Hanna-Barbera Australia	Traditional	Television special	Originally aired as the 25th installment of the CBS animated anthology series Famous Classic Tales (1970–1984).	November 24, 1977	60 minutes
A Flintstone Christmas	United States	Charles A. Nichols	Hanna-Barbera	Traditional	Television special		December 7, 1977	48 minutes
Gulliver's Travels	United Kingdom; Belgium	Peter R. Hunt	Belvision	Traditional/Live action	Theatrical; Live-action animated film		May 6, 1977	80 minutes
The Hobbit	United States; Japan	Jules Bass; Arthur Rankin Jr.	Rankin/Bass; Topcraft	Traditional	Television film		November 27, 1977	78 minutes
The Holiday of Disobedience; Праздник непослушания (Prazdnik neposlushaniya)	Soviet Union	Yulian Kalisher	Studio Ekran	Stop motion/Live action	Theatrical; Live-action animated film	The first, and so far the only, full-length animated feature film from Studio Ekran.	1977	47 minutes
A Journey to the Center of the Earth	Australia	Richard Slapczynski	Air Programs International	Traditional	Television special	Originally aired as the 24th installment of the CBS animated anthology series Famous Classic Tales (1970–1984).	November 13, 1977	60 minutes
The Lighthouse Island; Die Leuchtturminsel	East Germany	Günter Rätz	DEFA-Studio für Trickfilme	Stop motion	Theatrical	Made from 1974 to 1976, released in 1977.	February 4, 1977	41 minutes
The Little Magician and the Big Bad Mark; Der kleine Zauberer und die große Fünf	East Germany	Erwin Stranka	DEFA-Studio für Spielfilme; Künstlerische Arbeitsgruppe "Babelsberg" (as DEFA Gruppe Babelsberg); VEB Progress Film-Vertrieb (GDR) (distributor)	Traditional	Theatrical		February 4, 1977	70 minutes
Love in Freedom Liefde in vrijheid	Belgium	Jacques Kupissonoff	Proeuropa		Theatrical		May 18, 1977	76 minutes
The Many Adventures of Winnie the Pooh	United States	Wolfgang Reitherman; John Lounsbery; Art Stevens	Walt Disney Productions	Traditional	Theatrical; Anthology film	The first three Winnie the Pooh short films (Honey Tree, Blustery Day and Tigger Too) compiled into a three-part anthology film, with a few minutes of new wraparound animation. The shorts were previously released separately from February 4, 1966 to December 20, 1974.	March 11, 1977	74 minutes
Mattie the Goose-boy; Lúdas Matyi	Hungary	Attila Dargay	Pannónia Filmstúdió	Traditional	Theatrical		April 7, 1977	75 minutes
The Mouse and His Child	United States; Japan	Charles Swenson; Fred Wolf	Murakami-Wolf-Swenson; Sanrio	Traditional	Theatrical		November 18, 1977	83 minutes
Mr. Rossi's Dreams; I sogni del signor Rossi	Italy	Bruno Bozzetto	Bruno Bozzetto Film; Wagner-Hallig Film	Traditional	Theatrical		August 4, 1977	70 minutes
New Star of the Giants 新巨人の星	Japan		Tokyo Movie Shinsha	Traditional	Theatrical		December 1, 1977	77 minutes
La pobre viejecita	Colombia	Fernando Laverde	Global Films de Colombia	Stop motion	Theatrical	First Colombian animated film.	1977	
Pete's Dragon	United States	Don Chaffey	Walt Disney Productions	Traditional/Live action	Theatrical; Live-action animated film	The last live-action animated film produced by Disney until Who Framed Roger Rabbit (1988), released nine years later.	November 3, 1977	128 minutes
Race for Your Life, Charlie Brown	United States	Bill Melendez	Paramount Pictures; United Feature Syndicate; Mendelson/Melendez Productions	Traditional	Theatrical	Third feature film in the Peanuts franchise, and the first to be distributed by Paramount Pictures.	August 24, 1977	75 minutes
Raggedy Ann & Andy: A Musical Adventure	United States	Richard Williams	20th Century-Fox; Bobbs-Merrill Company	Traditional/Live action	Theatrical		April 1, 1977	86 minutes
The Rescuers	United States	Wolfgang Reitherman; John Lounsbery; Art Stevens	Walt Disney Productions	Traditional	Theatrical		June 22, 1977	77 minutes
Robot Taekwon V: Underwater Rangers 로보트 태권 V 제3탄 수중특공대 (Robot Taekwon V the 3rd: The Undersea Special Forces)	South Korea	Kim Cheong-gi	U Production	Traditional	Theatrical		July 20, 1977	75 minutes
The Scrap and the Cloud Лоскутик и Облако (Loskutik i Oblako)	Soviet Union	Rasa Strautmane	Studio Ekran	Cutout	Theatrical		December 31, 1978	55 minutes
Space Battleship Yamato 宇宙戦艦ヤマト (Uchū Senkan Yamato)	Japan	Toshio Masuda	Office Academy; Group TAC	Traditional	Theatrical	First installment of the Space Battleship Yamato series.	August 6, 1977	145 minutes
Taekwon dongja Maruchi Arachi 태권동자 마루치 아라치 (The Taekwondo Master Maruchi Arachi)	South Korea	Lim Jung-kyu	Samdo Film Co., Ltd.	Traditional	Theatrical		July 27, 1977	78 minutes
Two Maples Два клёна (Dva klyona)	Soviet Union	Anatoliy Solin	Studio Ekran	Cutout	Theatrical		1977	35 minutes
The Wild Swans 世界名作童話白鳥の王子 (Sekai Meisaku Dōwa: Hakuchō no Ōji)	Japan	Nobutaka Nishizawa	Toei Animation	Traditional	Theatrical	First film in the anthology film series Sekai Meisaku Dōwa (lit. "World Masterpiece Fairy Tales").	March 19, 1977	62 minutes
Wizards	United States	Ralph Bakshi	Bakshi Productions; 20th Century-Fox	Traditional	Theatrical	Next-to-first animated feature released by 20th Century-Fox, and the first the studio produced.	February 9, 1977	80 minutes
Xiao shizhu donghua 新来的小石柱 (The New Little Stone Pillar)	China	Wang Shuchen; Wu Qiang	Shanghai Animation Film Studio	Traditional	Theatrical			80 minutes

== Highest-grossing animated films of the year ==
Rank	Title	Studio	Gross	Ref
1	The Rescuers	Walt Disney Productions	US$29,000,000	
2	Space Battleship Yamato	Group TAC	US$23,000,000 (¥2,100,000,000)	
3	Wizards	Bakshi Productions	US$1,200,000	

== See also ==
- List of animated television series of 1977
