= List of fantasy films of the 1970s =

A list of fantasy films released in the 1970s.

== List ==
Title	Director	Cast	Country	Notes
1970
Donkey Skin	Jacques Demy	Catherine Deneuve, Jean Marais, Jacques Perrin	France; Spain	
The Phantom Tollbooth	Chuck Jones, Abe Levitow, Dave Monahan, Jones Levitow	Butch Patrick	United States	
The Secret of the Iron Door	Mikhail Yuzovsky	Alisa Freindlich, Oleg Tabakov, Saveli Kramarov	Soviet Union	
Valerie and Her Week of Wonders	Jaromil Jireš	Jaroslava Schallerová, Helena Anyzková, Petr Kopriva	Czechoslovakia	
When Dinosaurs Ruled the Earth	Val Guest	Victoria Vetri, Robin Hawdon, Patrick Allen	United Kingdom	
1971
A Christmas Carol	Richard Williams		United States	Animated film
Bedknobs & Broomsticks	Robert Stevenson	Angela Lansbury, David Tomlinson, Roddy McDowall	United States	
Death Takes a Holiday			United States	Made for TV
Willy Wonka & the Chocolate Factory	Mel Stuart	Gene Wilder, Jack Albertson, Peter Ostrum	United States	
1972
Dougal and the Blue Cat	Serge Danot	Serge Danot, Fenella Fielding	France	
Veronica	Elisabeta Bostan	Lulu Mihăescu, Margareta Pîslaru, Dem Rădulescu	Romania	
Ruslan and Ludmila	Aleksandr Ptushko	Valeri Kozinets, Andrei Abrikosov	Soviet Union	
Săgeata căpitanului Ion	Aurel Miheleș	Vladimir Găitan, Carmen Ghiman, Amza Pellea	Romania	
1973
Charlotte's Web	Charles A. Nichols, Iwao Takamoto		United States	Animated film
Veronica Returns	Elisabeta Bostan	Lulu Mihăescu, Margareta Pîslaru, Dem Rădulescu	Romania	
1974
Păcală (film)	Geo Saizescu	Sebastian Papaiani, Mariella Petrescu, Ștefan Mihăilescu-Brăila, Vasilica Tastaman	Romania	
Arabian Nights	Pier Paolo Pasolini	Franco Merli, Ines Pellegrini, Ninetto Davoli	Italy; France	
The Golden Voyage of Sinbad	Gordon Hessler	John Phillip Law, Caroline Munro, Tom Baker	United Kingdom	
The Year Without a Santa Claus	Jules Bass, Arthur Rankin Jr.	Shirley Booth, Mickey Rooney, Dick Shawn, George S. Irving	United States	stop-motion animated Christmas television special
1975
Black Moon	Louis Malle	Cathryn Harrison, Therese Giehse, Alexandra Stewart, Joe Dallesandro	France	
Escape to Witch Mountain	John Hough	Eddie Albert, Ray Milland, Donald Pleasence, Kim Richards, Ike Eisenmann	United States	
Get Mean	Ferdinando Baldi	Tony Anthony, Lloyd Battista, Raf Baldassarre, Diana Lorys	Italy; United States	
The Land That Time Forgot	Kevin Connor	Doug McClure, John McEnery, Susan Penhaligon	United Kingdom	
Monty Python and the Holy Grail	Terry Gilliam, Terry Jones	Graham Chapman, John Cleese, Eric Idle, Terry Jones, Michael Palin, Terry Gilliam	United Kingdom	
The Noah	Daniel Bourla	Robert Strauss, Geoffrey Holder, Sally Kirkland	United States	
1976
Rock'n'Roll Wolf	Elisabeta Bostan	Lyudmila Gurchenko, Mikhail Boyarsky, George Mihăiță, Florian Pittiș, Violeta Andrei	Romania Soviet Union	
Freaky Friday	Gary Nelson	Barbara Harris, Jodie Foster, John Astin	United States	
The Humpbacked Horse	Ivan Ivanov-Vano		Soviet Union	Remake of a 1947 animated film
The Twelve Tasks of Asterix	René Goscinny, Albert Uderzo		France	Animated
1977
The Hobbit	Jules Bass, Arthur Rankin Jr.	Orson Bean, John Huston, Richard Boone, Hans Conried	United States	Animated film
Jabberwocky	Terry Gilliam	Michael Palin, Max Wall, Deborah Fallender	United Kingdom	
Oh, God!	Carl Reiner	George Burns, John Denver, Teri Garr	United States	
Pete's Dragon	Don Chaffey	Helen Reddy, Jim Dale, Mickey Rooney	United States	
The Many Adventures of Winnie the Pooh	John Lounsbery, Wolfgang Reitherman	Sterling Holloway, John Fiedler, Paul Winchell, Junius Matthews, Howard Morris, Bruce Reitherman, Jon Walmsley, Timothy Turner	United States	Animated film
Sinbad and the Eye of the Tiger	Sam Wanamaker	Patrick Wayne, Jane Seymour, Taryn Power, Patrick Troughton, Margaret Whiting	United Kingdom	
Star Wars: Episode IV – A New Hope	George Lucas	Mark Hamill, Harrison Ford, Carrie Fisher, Peter Cushing, Alec Guinness	United States	science fantasy
Wizards	Ralph Bakshi	Mark Hamill	United States	Animated film
1978
31 June	Leonid Kvinikhidze	Nikolai Yeryomenko, Vladimir Zeldin, Vladimir Etush	Soviet Union	
Heaven Can Wait	Warren Beatty, Buck Henry	Warren Beatty, Julie Christie, James Mason	United States	
The Lord of the Rings	Ralph Bakshi	John Hurt	United States	Animated film
An Ordinary Miracle	Mark Zakharov	Oleg Yankovsky, Aleksandr Abdulov, Evgeni Leonov, Andrei Mironov	Soviet Union	
Petey Wheatstraw	Cliff Roguemore	Rudy Ray Moore, Jimmy Lynch, Wildman Steve	United States	
Return from Witch Mountain	John Hough	Bette Davis, Christopher Lee, Kim Richards, Ike Eisenmann, Jack Soo, Anthony James	United States	
The Water Babies	Lionel Jeffries		Poland; United Kingdom	
1979
The Fish That Saved Pittsburgh	Gilbert Moses	Julius "Dr. J" Erving, Jonathan Winters, Meadowlark Lemon	United States	
The Very Same Munchhausen	Mark Zakharov	Oleg Yankovskiy, Inna Churikova, Yelena Koreneva	Soviet Union	
Arabian Adventure	Kevin Connor	Christopher Lee, Milo O'Shea, Oliver Tobias	United Kingdom	
