= Stan Brock (philanthropist) =

British philanthropist, presenter, actor & author (1936-2018)

Stanley Edmunde Brock
- Born: April 21, 1936; Preston, Lancashire
- Died: August 29, 2018 (aged 82); Rockford, Tennessee
- Education: Canford School, Wimborne, Dorset
- Organization: Founder of the Remote Area Medical
- Known for: Philanthropy, acting, author
- Notable work: Co-host of NBC's Emmy winning series Mutual of Omaha's Wild Kingdom

Stanley Edmunde Brock (April 21, 1936 – August 29, 2018) was a British philanthropist, presenter, actor and author who founded the charity Remote Area Medical in 1985. Critical of the healthcare system in the U.S., The Independent states his work rescued millions of uninsured Americans.

== Early life ==
Stanley Edmunde Brock was born in 1936 in Preston, Lancashire, England. He grew up in Uplands, Swansea, where he enjoyed learning Welsh at school. He was educated at Canford School, Wimborne, Dorset.

Brock travelled to Georgetown, British Guiana (now Guyana) in 1952 at the age of 17. He found work at the Dadanawa Ranch, managing the world's largest cattle ranch operation encompassing 4,000-square miles of rainforest and savannah. Dadanawa at that time contained over 30,000 Longhorn cattle and wild horses within the ranch. In time he would become the equivalent of the foreman among the other cowboys, or "Vaqueros," as they referred to themselves.

During his time in British Guiana, Brock also became a pioneer bush pilot, which led to various certifications including airline transport pilot. It is here that the vision for his non-profit, Remote Area Medical, was born when he suffered an accident from one of the horses and was 26 days away on foot from the nearest medical care.

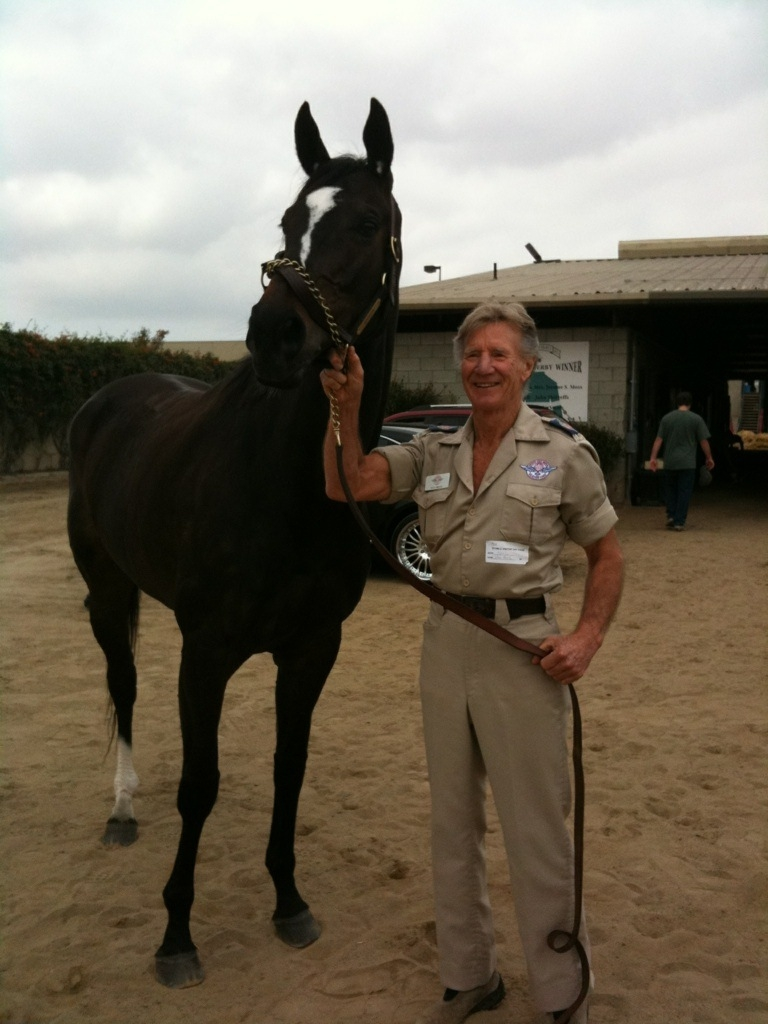
Stan Brock and Zenyatta the Champion Thoroughbred Racing Mare

== Media career ==
=== Television ===
After Brock's time in British Guiana, he began co-hosting NBC's Emmy winning series Mutual of Omaha's Wild Kingdom with Marlin Perkins in 1968. The series became one of the most watched television shows in the United States, with more than 32 million weekly viewers. The show highlighted animals in their natural habitat and raised awareness of the environment.

=== Film ===
Brock starred in three films:The Corner Bar (1973), Escape from Angola (1976) and Galyon the Indestructible Man (1980). The later two films are classified as "Action Movies" and were productions of legendary Hollywood producer Ivan Tors. The Corner Bar was the only comedy film Stan performed in.

Stan Brock is also the subject of a 2020 feature-length documentary entitled “Medicine Man: The Stan Brock Story”, directed by Paul Michael Angell. The film won several awards at US film festivals and was released nationwide at US theaters in 2023.

== Writings ==
He was the author of three books on his experiences in Guyana: Leemo, A True Story of a Man's Friendship with a Mountain Lion (London, 1967), More About Leemo (London, 1967) and Jungle Cowboy (United States, 1969), republished in 1999 as All the Cowboys were Indians. He wrote various articles for magazines, including Reader's Digest and Outdoor Life.

== Philanthropy ==
Brock was the founder of the non-profit organization Remote Area Medical (RAM). He founded the organization after being unable to gain access to healthcare when he suffered a serious injury in Guyana. The organization's services primarily include dental, vision, and medical examinations for underserved populations. RAM veterinary care extends to companion animals, providing basic spay and neuter practices. RAM clinics operate throughout the United States and in other countries such as Haiti, India, Kenya, and Guyana. There is also an international disaster relief portion of RAM that serves areas affected.

In August 2009, RAM operated temporary medical clinics in Los Angeles, offering free dental, vision, and medical treatment to thousands of Americans without medical insurance coverage.

To date, RAM has operated more than 1,000 free clinics and provided more than $150 million in charitable care.

== Personal life ==
According to a report in The Independent (UK), Brock "...has no money, no income, and no bank account. He spends 365 days a year at the charity events, sleeping on a small rolled-up mat on the floor and living on a diet made up entirely of porridge and fresh fruit."

The Independent also noted that Brock was married before establishing RAM and that the marriage collapsed as a result of Brock's obsessive dedication to the cause. The marriage produced no children; Brock acknowledged the lack of a family as one of the drawbacks of his lifestyle, stating: "I'm trying to think of a way to put this—would I like to be married? Yes. Would I like to have children? Yes. But I've got thousands of them now."

Brock was a karate black belt holder and physical fitness expert. He was an experienced pilot skilled in dealing with difficult landing sites. The discovery of a rare species of bat has been attributed to him, Vampyressa brocki.

In September 2010, Brock was awarded the Inamori Ethics Prize by the Inamori International Centre for Ethics and Excellence at Case Western Reserve University, Cleveland, Ohio. In July 2016, Brock was recipient of the Lions Club International Humanitarian of the Year award.

A documentary feature film about Brock's life, Medicine Man: The Stan Brock Story, premiered at Nashville Film Festival in October 2020. A one-day showing of the film took place in the United States on November 14, 2023, in conjunction with Fathom Events.

== Death ==
Brock died at RAM Headquarters in Rockford, Tennessee, on August 29, 2018, at the age of 82, due to complications from a stroke.
