= Umberto Lenzi filmography =

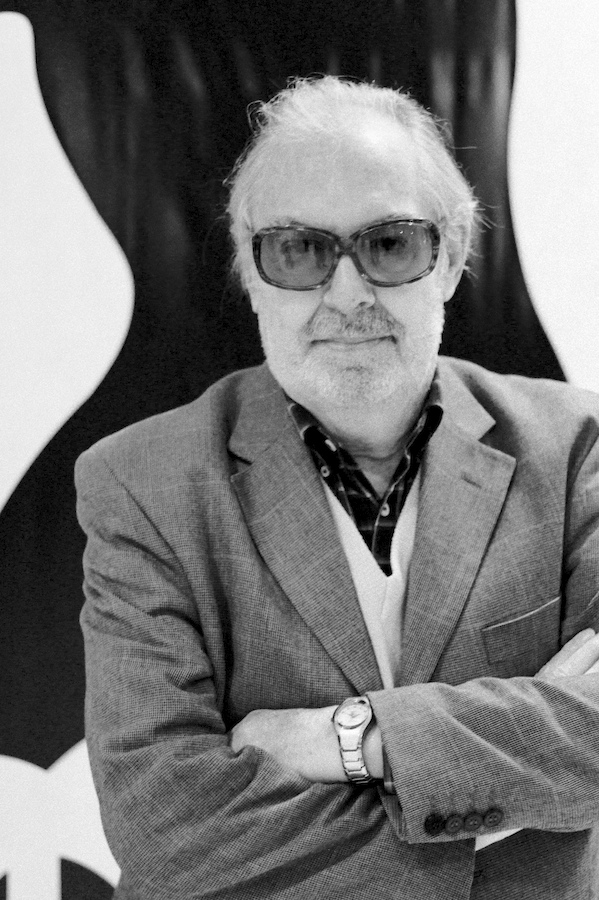
Lenzi at the 2008 Sitges Film Festival

Umberto Lenzi (August 6, 1931 – October 19, 2017) was an Italian film director whose filmography encompassed a ranges of genres across a prolific career. Born in Massa Marittima, Tuscany, Lenzi studied law before enrolling at the Centro Sperimentale di Cinematografia in Rome. As part of his studies, he wrote and directed the short film Ragazzi di Trastevere, based on Pier Paolo Pasolini's novel Ragazzi di vita. During this time, he worked as a film critic for the Centro's journal Bianco e Nero, and was an avid follower of both European and American films, favouring the work of directors John Ford, Raoul Walsh, and Michael Curtiz.

Lenzi's production career began as a location scout for the 1958 film Raw Wind in Eden; his directorial debut would come with 1961's pirate film Queen of the Seas. (Note: Lenzi's first film as a director, the 1958 Greek production Mia Italida stin Ellada, was never released.) Lenzi worked across a broad variety of film genres, helming Spaghetti Westerns, gialli, spy films, war films, and poliziotteschi across his career. He was also an early figure in the cannibal boom as a result of his work on 1972's Man from the Deep River, along with later cannibal follow-ups Eaten Alive! (1980) and Cannibal Ferox (1981); these films would feature on the United Kingdom's "video nasties" list of banned releases. Although dismissive of his horror films and their cult following among fans, Lenzi believed that his work on genre films, and that of his peers in the Italian film industry, effectively bankrolled more artistic output from his compatriots.

Stylistically, Lenzi regularly made use of prominent close-up shots of his actors and employed zoom lens effects, but preferred to be seen primarily as a storyteller who was not heavy-handed with cinematic effects. Towards the end of his film career, Lenzi worked on foreign productions in the United States, including Welcome to Spring Break and Ghosthouse (both 1988), as well as directing a pair of television films for Reteitalia, La casa delle anime erranti and La casa dei sortilegi. He would continue to produce small-market films for a few years before retiring from film-making to become an author of detective fiction. Lenzi died at the age of 86, on October 19, 2017.

== Filmography ==
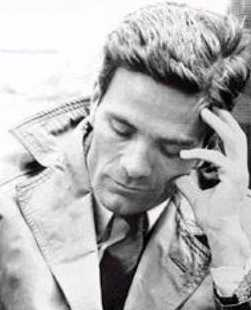
Lenzi's studies at the Centro Sperimentale di Cinematografia included the direction of a short film based on the novel Ragazzi di vita by Pier Paolo Pasolini (pictured).

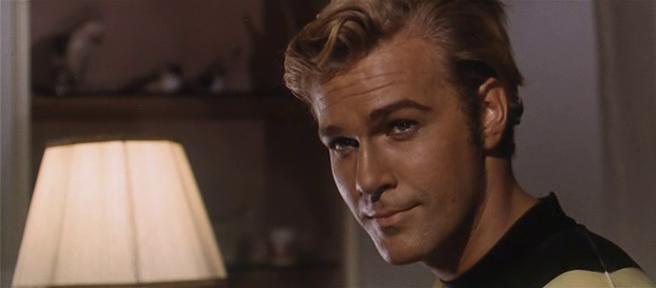
1966's Kriminal (star Glenn Saxson pictured), an adaptation of the comic of the same name, is considered the first film adaptation of an Italian fumetti neri comic.

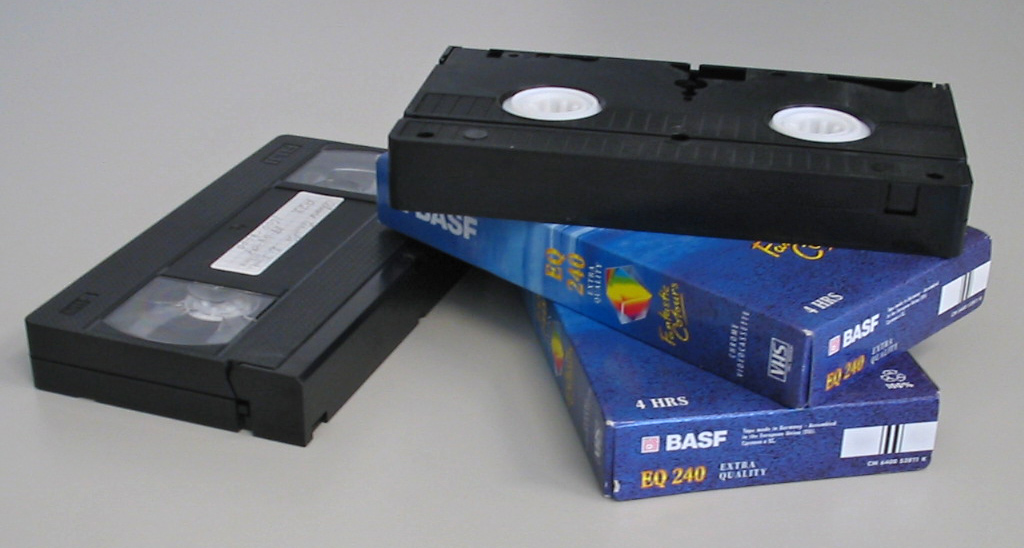
Several of Lenzi's films were included on the United Kingdom's "video nasty" list. Actor Me Me Lai, who had starred in Mangiati vivi! and Il paese del sesso selvaggio, later worked as an English police officer responsible for confiscating the same films she featured in.

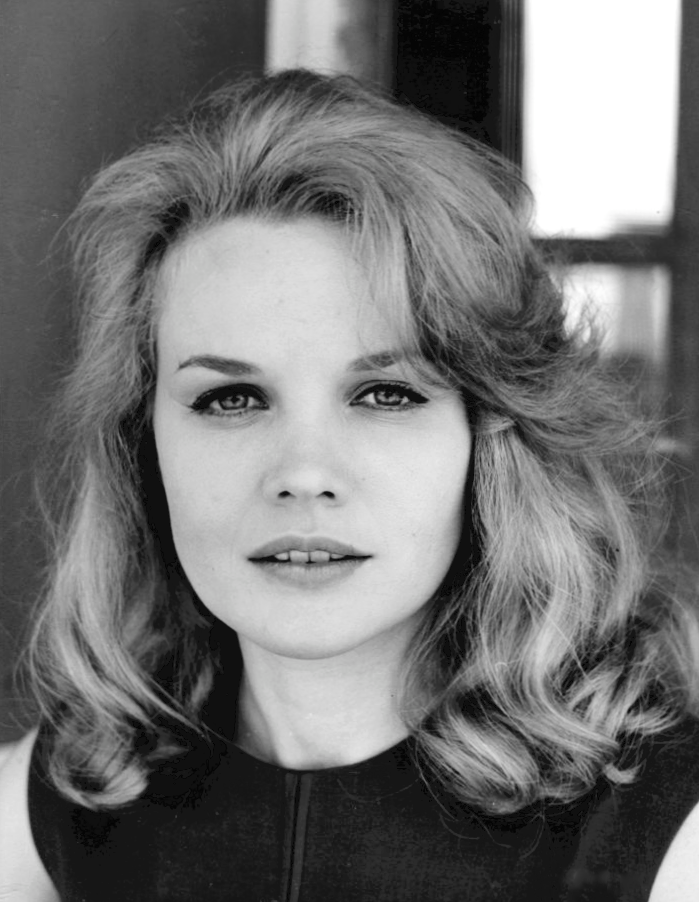
Several of Lenzi's giallo thrillers starred Carroll Baker (pictured in 1962).

Year	Italian title	English title	Functioned as			Notes	Ref.
Year	Italian title	English title	Director	Writer	Other	Notes	Ref.
1956	Ragazzi di Trastevere	—N/a	Yes	Yes	No	Short film	
1961	Le avventure di Mary Read	Queen of the Seas	Yes	No	No		
1962	Duello nella sila	Duel of Fire	Yes	No	No		
1962	Il trionfo di Robin Hood	Triumphs of Robin Hood	Yes	No	No		
1963	Caterina di Russia	Catherine of Russia	Yes	No	No		
1963	L'invincibile cavaliere mascherato	The Invincible Masked Rider	Yes	No	No		
1963	Zorro contro Maciste	Samson and the Slave Queen	Yes	Yes	No		
1963	Sandokan, la tigre di Mompracem	Sandokan the Great	Yes	Yes	No		
1964	I tre sergenti del Bengala	Adventures of the Bengal Lancers	Yes	No	No		
1964	Sandok, il Maciste della giungla	Temple of the White Elephant	Yes	Yes	No		
1964	L'ultimo gladiatore	Messalina vs. the Son of Hercules	Yes	No	No		
1964	I pirati della Malesia	Pirates of Malaysia	Yes	No	No		
1965	A 008, operazione Sterminio	008: Operation Exterminate	Yes	No	No		
1965	La montagna di luce	Jungle Adventurer	Yes	No	No		
1965	Superseven chiama Cairo	Super Seven Calling Cairo	Yes	Yes	No		
1966	Kriminal	Kriminal	Yes	Yes	No		
1966	Un milione di dollari per sette assassini	Last Man to Kill	Yes	Yes	No		
1966	Le spie amano i fiori	The Spy Who Loved Flowers	Yes	Yes	No		
1968	Tutto per tutto	Go for Broke	Yes	No	No		
1968	Una pistola per cento bare	Pistol for a Hundred Coffins	Yes	No	No		
1969	Orgasmo	Paranoia	Yes	Yes	No		
1969	La legione dei dannati	Battle of the Commandos	Yes	No	No		
1969	Così dolce... così perversa	So Sweet.... So Perverse	Yes	No	No		
1970	Paranoia	A Quiet Place to Kill	Yes	No	No		
1971	Un posto ideale per uccidere	Oasis of Fear	Yes	No	No		
1972	Il coltello di ghiaccio	Knife of Ice	Yes	No	No		
1972	Il paese del sesso selvaggio	Man from Deep River	Yes	No	No		
1972	Sette orchidee macchiate di rosso	Seven Blood-Stained Orchids	Yes	No	No		
1973	Milano rovente	Gang War in Milan	Yes	Yes	No		
1974	Spasmo	Spasmo	Yes	Yes	No		
1974	Milano odia: la polizia non può sparare	Almost Human	Yes	No	No		
1975	Gatti rossi in un labirinto di vetro	Eyeball	Yes	No	No		
1975	L'uomo della strada fa giustizia	Manhunt in the City	Yes	No	No		
1975	Il giustiziere sfida la città	Syndicate Sadists	Yes	No	No		
1976	Napoli violenta	Violent Naples	Yes	No	No		
1976	Roma a mano armata	Rome Armed to the Teeth	Yes	Yes	No		
1976	Il trucido e lo sbirro	Free Hand for a Tough Cop	Yes	Yes	No		
1977	Il cinico, l'infame, il violento	The Cynic, the Rat and the Fist	Yes	Yes	No		
1977	La banda del gobbo	Brothers Till We Die	Yes	Yes	No		
1978	Il grande attacco	The Greatest Battle	Yes	Yes	No		
1979	Contro 4 bandiere	From Hell to Victory	Yes	Yes	No		
1979	Scusi lei è normale?	—N/a	Yes	No	No		
1979	Da Corleone a Brooklyn	From Corleone to Brooklyn	Yes	Yes	No		
1980	Mangiati vivi!	Eaten Alive!	Yes	No	No		
1980	Incubo sulla città contaminata	Nightmare City	Yes	No	Yes	Actor; as "Reporter"	
1981	Cannibal Ferox	Make Them Die Slowly	Yes	Yes	No		
1982	Pierino la peste alla riscossa	—N/a	Yes	No	No		
1982	Incontro nell'ultimo paradiso	Daughter of the Jungle	Yes	No	No		
1982	Cicciabomba	—N/a	Yes	No	No		
1983	La guerra del ferro: Ironmaster	Ironmaster	Yes	No	No		
1985	Squadra selvaggia	The Wild Team	Yes	No	No		
1987	Un ponte per l'inferno	Bridge to Hell	Yes	No	No		
1987	Tempi di guerra	Wartime	Yes	Yes	No		
1988	La casa 3	Ghosthouse	Yes	Yes	No		
1988	Nightmare Beach - La spiaggia del terrore	Nightmare Beach	Yes	Yes	No		
1989	Obiettivo poliziotto	Cop Target	Yes	No	Yes	Actor; as "Casino Patron"	
1989	Paura nel buio	Hitcher in the Dark	Yes	No	No		
1989	Le porte dell'inferno	—N/a	Yes	Yes	No		
1990	Caccia allo scorpione d'oro	Hunt for the Golden Scorpion	Yes	No	No		
1990	Hornsby e Rodriguez	Mean Tricks	Yes	No	No		
1991	Dèmoni 3	Black Demons	Yes	Story	No		
1991	Black Cobra 4 - Detective Malone	Detective Malone	Yes	No	No		
2000 (Note: Year of release in Italy)	La casa delle anime erranti	House of Lost Souls	Yes	Yes	No	Television film	
2000	La casa dei sortilegi	House of Witchcraft	Yes	Yes	No	Television film	

=== Writer only ===
Year	Italian title	English title	Director	Ref.
1961	Il terrore dei mari	Guns of the Black Witch	Domenico Paolella	
1962	Le verdi bandiere di Allah	Slave Girls of Sheba	Giacomo Gentilomo; Guido Zurli	
1968	Il figlio di Aquila Nera	The Son of Black Eagle	Guido Malatesta	
1993	Graffiante desiderio	Craving Desire	Sergio Martino	
1988	Striker	—N/a	Enzo G. Castellari	
1988	Rage: Furia primitiva	Primal Rage	Vittorio Rambaldi	

=== Producer only ===
Year	Italian title	English title	Director	Ref.
1976	Con la rabbia agli occhi	Death Rage	Antonio Margheriti	

=== Other credits ===
Year	Italian title	English title	Director	Notes	Ref.
1958		Raw Wind in Eden	Richard Wilson	Location scout	
1960	Apocalisse sul fiume giallo	The Dam on the Yellow River	Renzo Merusi	Assistant director	
1961	Costantino il grande: In hoc signo vinces	Constantine and the Cross	Lionello De Felice	Assistant director	
1958	Amore e chiacchiere	Love and Chatter	Alessandro Blasetti	Actor; as "Soldier on Train"	

== Bibliography ==
- "Umberto Lenzi". British Film Institute. Archived from the original on September 21, 2016.
- Capua, Michaelangelo (2014). Yul Brynner: A Biography. McFarland. ISBN 9780786480357.
- Curti, Roberto (2013). Italian Crime Filmography, 1968-1980. McFarland. ISBN 9781476612089.
- Curti, Roberto (2016). Diabolika: Supercriminals, Superheroes and the Comic Book Universe in Italian Cinema. Midnight Marquee Press. ISBN 9781936168606.
- Curti, Roberto (2016b). Tonino Valerii: The Films. McFarland. ISBN 978-1476626185.
- Curti, Roberto (2019). Italian Gothic Horror Films, 1980-1989. McFarland. ISBN 9781476672434.
- Ercolani, Eugenio (2019). Darkening the Italian Screen: Interviews with Genre and Exploitation Directors Who Debuted in the 1950s and 1960s. McFarland. ISBN 9781476635385.
- Kinnard, Roy; Crnkovich, Tony (2017). Italian Sword and Sandal Films, 1908-1990. McFarland. ISBN 9781476662916.
- Lancia, Enrico; Melelli, Fabio (2006). Attori stranieri del nostro cinema. Gremese Editore. ISBN 8884404258.
- Paul, Louis (2015). Italian Horror Film Directors. McFarland. ISBN 9780786487493.
- Shipka, Danny (2011). Perverse Titillation: The Exploitation Cinema of Italy, Spain and France, 1960–1980 (illustrated ed.). McFarland & Company. ISBN 978-0-786-44888-3.
