= Cannibalism in popular culture =

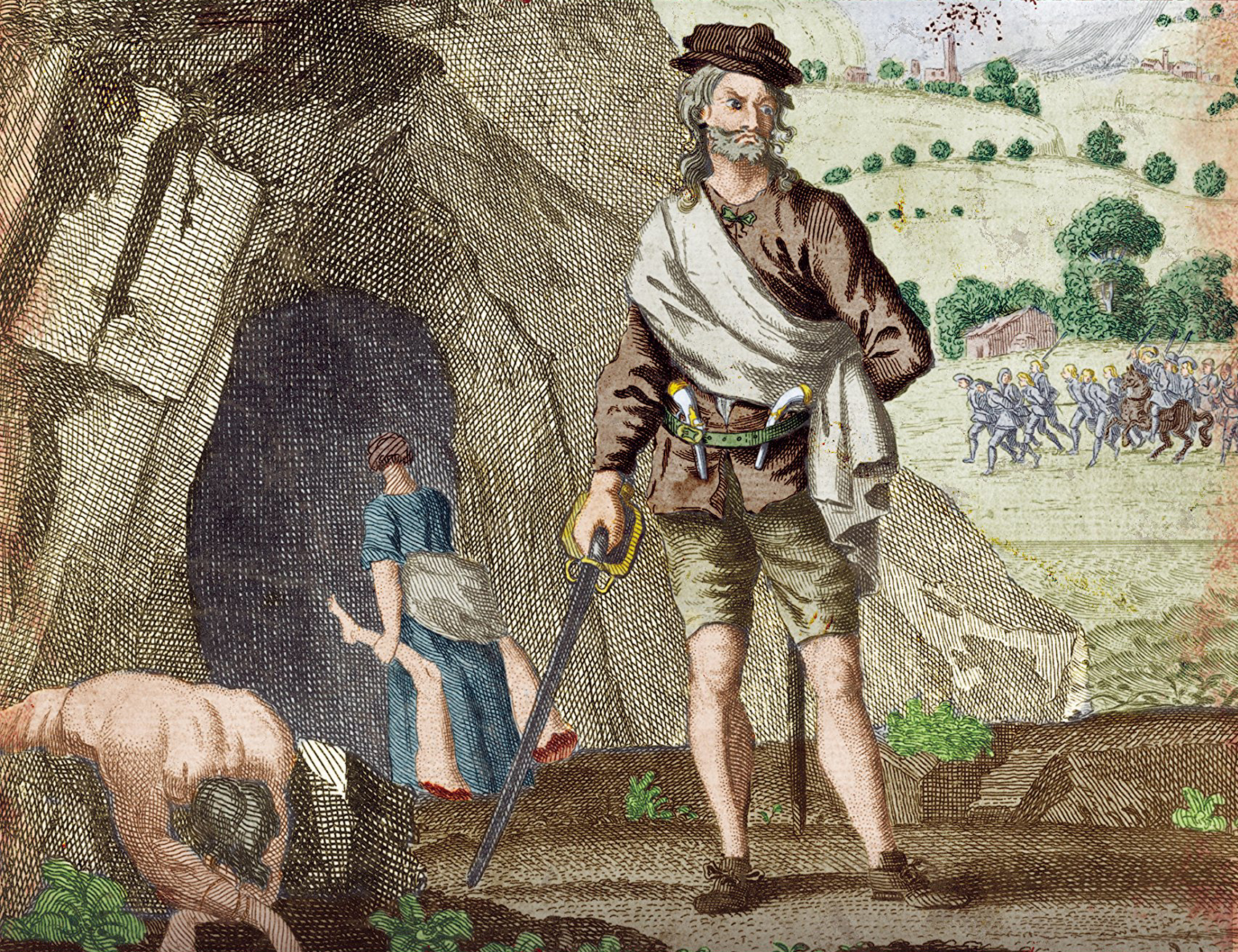
18th-century depiction of Sawney Bean. His wife, in the background, is carrying off human legs for consumption, while a dead body is visible to the left.

Cannibalism, the act of eating human flesh, is a recurring theme in popular culture, especially within the horror genre, and has been featured in a range of media that includes film, television, literature, music and video games. Cannibalism has been featured in various forms of media as far back as Greek mythology. The frequency of this theme has led to cannibal films becoming a notable subgenre of horror films. The subject has been portrayed in various different ways and is occasionally normalized. The act may also be used in media as a means of survival, an accidental misfortune, or an accompaniment to murder. Examples of prominent artists who have worked with the topic of cannibalism include William Shakespeare, Voltaire, Bret Easton Ellis, and Herschell Gordon Lewis.

== As a cultural norm ==
Many works in popular culture depict groups of people for whom cannibalism is a cultural norm.

=== Film ===
The cannibal tribe theme has been exploited in the genre of cannibal films. This subgenre experienced a period of popularity through the work of Italian filmmakers in the 1970s and 1980s. These films commonly concern the discovery of cannibalistic tribes by documentary filmmakers or anthropologists. The first major film of this type was Umberto Lenzi's Il Paese del Sesso Selvaggio ("The Man from the Deep River", 1972). Later filmmakers followed, and the genre reached its peak in the cannibal boom of 1977 to 1981. The best known of these films was Ruggero Deodato's influential Cannibal Holocaust (1980). Considered one of history's most gruesome movies, Cannibal Holocaust was commonly believed to be a snuff film, and Deodato was brought to trial on suspicion of having killed his actors. Other genre films include Ultimo mondo cannibale (1977) and Cannibal Ferox (1981).

Later horror films to feature cannibal groups include The Hills Have Eyes series, with its clan of cannibalistic savages, and the cannibalistic mountain men of Wrong Turn and its sequels. The film Como Era Gostoso o Meu Francês (How Tasty Was My Little Frenchman, 1971), by Nelson Pereira dos Santos, details the alleged cannibalistic practices of the indigenous Tupinamba warrior tribe against French and Portuguese colonizers in the 16th century.

=== Literature ===
==== American literature ====
In Tennessee Williams' play Suddenly Last Summer (which debuted 7 January 1958) and its subsequent adaptations, the fate of the deceased son of Mrs. Venable is revealed to have been death at the hands of natives who then ate his remains.

In Robert A. Heinlein's science fiction novel Stranger in a Strange Land (1961), human culture is transformed as a result of the Martians' practice of eating their dead friends as an act of great respect. In contrast, his novel Farnham's Freehold (1964) is set in a distant future where both cannibalism and slavery have become normal institutions. Here there is nothing respectful about the custom, instead human flesh is eaten as a particularly tasty dish and traded as a commodity much like any other. To produce it, children are bred on ranches and slaughtered when reaching puberty, if not already as babies.

Jack Ketchum's horror novel Off Season (1980) features a clan of cannibalistic savages in rural America. Inspired by the Scottish legend of Sawney Bean, the novel was initially harshly criticized for its depictions of extreme violence.

Anne Rice's novel The Queen of the Damned (1988) references an ancient culture who practice necro-cannibalism because they consider the consumption of their loved ones' remains a more fitting funeral rite than burial or cremation.

Terry Goodkind's The Sword of Truth fantasy series (1994–2020) features the Mud People, a wild tribe which consumes the dried meat of their enemies before important events and rituals, believing it a way of gaining the enemies' wisdom. The Mud People are known to sometimes receive visions about the intentions of the victims and their people, and Richard Cypher himself receives such a vision during one of the times he has to eat human flesh in order to participate in such an event. Kahlan Amnell, aware of the custom, pretends to be a vegetarian whenever visiting the tribe.

In Rudy Rucker's novel Freeware (1997), a character named Wendy clones her own muscle cells and sells the product as Wendy Meat. As it is her own body, offered voluntarily, it is not considered unethical in the novel.

The Transmetropolitan comic book series (1997–2002), by Warren Ellis and Darick Robertson, includes cultural cannibalism in its setting, where many bizarre and outlandish lifestyles are now common. Most notable is the fast-food chain "Long Pig", which serves the meat of clones who are grown without a brain and thus never considered "alive" as such.

Michael Crichton's techno-thriller novel State of Fear (2004) features scenes where the characters encounter cannibals on a remote Pacific island.

Our Lady of the Inferno, a novel by Preston Fassel published in 2016 that was also adapted into an audio drama (2021), is about a woman in 1980s Times Square who believes herself to be a reincarnation of the Minotaur and as a result only consumes human flesh.

==== South American literature ====
Tender Is the Flesh is a 2017 Argentinian dystopian novel written by Agustina Bazterrica focusing on a society which consumes human flesh instead of animal flesh as a satire on capitalism.

==== British literature ====
The Wanting Seed (1962), a dystopian novel by Anthony Burgess, depicts a future haunted by serious overpopulation. The government's attempts to curb population growth through strict laws and encouragement of homosexuality ultimately fail, leading to a period of chaos and lawlessness where people start to openly kidnap, kill, and consume others. A new government then sets up a secret system of organized mass killings and cannibalism to stop the population explosion.

Cannibalism is a topic of two of the six interwoven stories in David Mitchell's novel Cloud Atlas (2004), which was also turned into a movie (2012). The first story, "The Pacific Journal of Adam Ewing", mentions a historical attack of a group of Māori on the Moriori living on the Chatham Islands, where the story begins. The fifth story, "An Orison of Sonmi~451", is set in the future and describes how "genetic clones are specifically bred to be a working underclass [and] exploited not only for their labor but for the nutritious protein that their physical bodies represent" – once they are no longer considered useful for working, they are turned into fast food for the ruling class. By making cannibalism a feature of the future as well as the past, Mitchell "raises questions about the myths of progress and linear time that underlie Western thought."

==== Asian literature ====
In Mo Yan's satirical novel The Republic of Wine (1992), male infants, called "meat children" or "meat boys", are slaughtered around the age of two and served whole, "boiled, steamed, or braised", as gourmet dishes in a fictional Chinese province called Liquorland. The book has been read as criticizing the increasing disparities in wealth and status in Chinese society, where the "pleasure and desire for delicacies" of the wealthy matter more than the lives of the poor, until "the inferior in social rank becomes food" in the novel's satirical exaggeration.

==== New Zealand literature ====
The historical novel Kāwai: For Such a Time as This by the historian Monty Soutar is set in New Zealand before and during the first contacts between Europeans and Māori. Inspired by Māori oral history, it treats cannibalism as a normal, if not frequent part of life. Enemies are eaten "as a final and irreversible insult to the defeated" and occasionally slaves (pononga) are killed for feasts, where their flesh is preferred to that of animals.

=== Video games ===
Aboleths in the Forgotten Realms setting of the Dungeons & Dragons role-playing game consume their parents on birth, and in so doing receive their parents' memories.

The Fallout series of video games, set in a post-apocalyptic America, has recurring themes of cannibalism. The most commonly seen ones are the Raiders, clans of savage killers living in the wasteland who habitually eat their victims flesh, which can be gained as an item called Strange Meat. Fallout 3 also has the community of Andale, a two-family clan emulating the faux-1950's culture of pre-war society, while simultaneously practising both inbreeding and cannibalism, similar to the notorious Sawney Bean legend. Fallout: New Vegas has another notable example in the White Glove Society, an upper class aristocratic group based out of the luxurious Ultra-Luxe casino in Las Vegas, who are in reality the descendants of a cannibal tribe that once inhabited the ruins of Vegas before it was restored by Mr House. One of their chairmen is intending to return the group to its roots by serving the members human flesh without their knowledge, with the player having the choice of either helping or stopping him. From Fallout 3 and onward, the player may also become a cannibal through a perk. The perk allows the player to regain health at the expense of "karma", the series' in-game morality meter. In addition, as most survivors abhor cannibalism, eating human flesh in-game may cause nearby NPC's to become distrustful or even hostile to the player.

The Elder Scrolls V: Skyrim, features a quest in which the dragonborn (player) discovers a clan of worshipers of the daedric prince, Namira, who consume the flesh of corpses found in the catacombs underneath Markarth. Players can then choose to either partake in the cannibalism, or put an end to it. Partaking will involve the player unlocking a ring that allows them to consume any humanoid corpse they find in order to recover some health.

The Last of Us features a group of cannibalistic survivors who kidnap Ellie during a winter snowstorm.

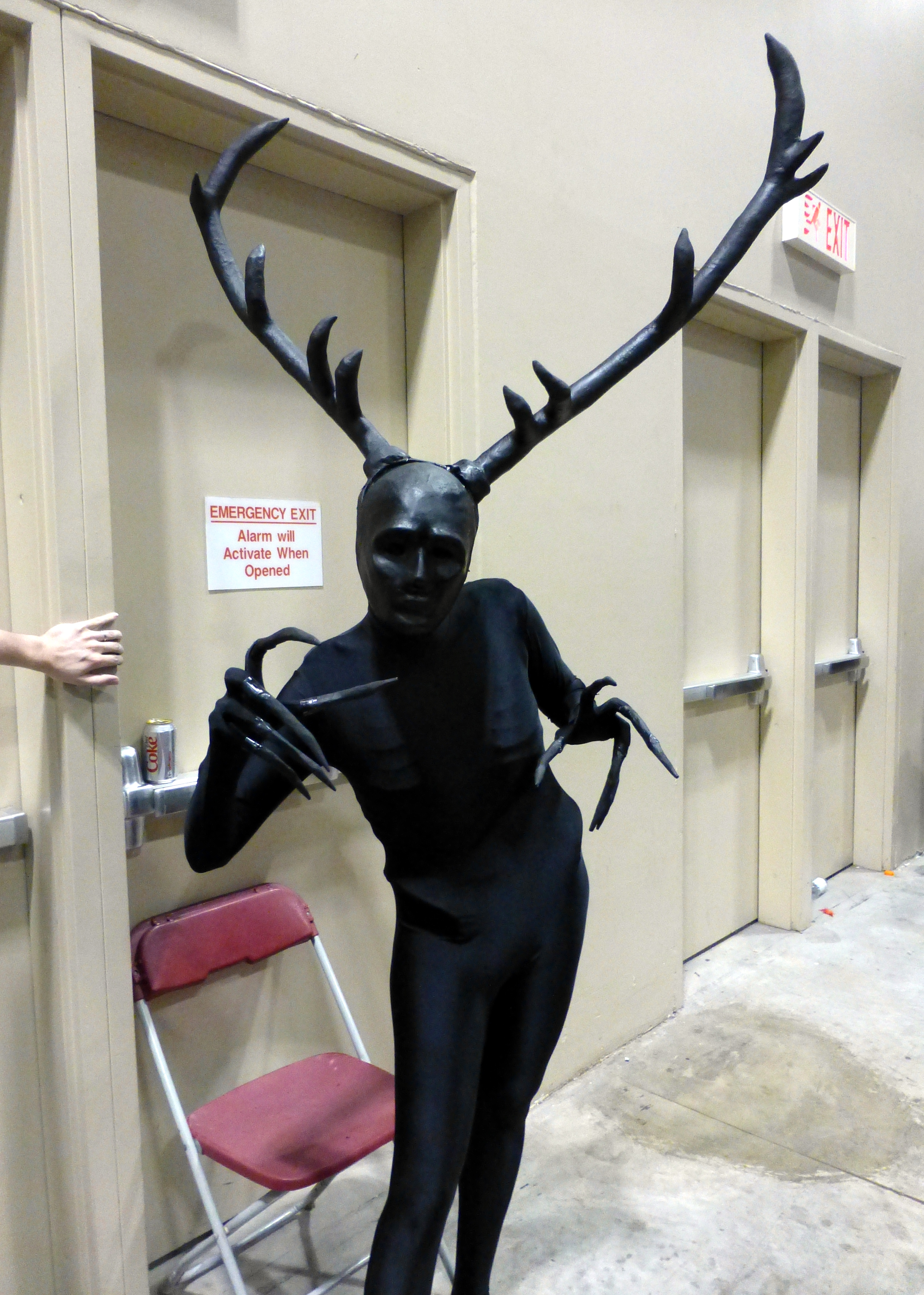
A person dressed as the wendigo character from the television series Hannibal at Fan Expo 2015

The plot of Until Dawn heavily features cannibalism. Near the end of the game it is revealed that after Hannah and Beth fell down a ravine and were presumed dead, Hannah actually survived and had to eat her sister's flesh to survive, which awakened the wendigos the player encounters throughout the game.

The Coffin of Andy and Leyley features several instances of cannibalism, serving as an important representation of the titular characters' moral decay. This includes them eating their seemingly deceased neighbour to prevent starvation, and later one or both of them eating their parents' remains. An optional scene features an attempt to cook a family of campers over a campfire. The game's tagline on Steam is "Cannibalism and codependency!"

The survival horror game The Forest features strong themes of cannibalism. The player can consume the limbs of slain enemies, and the island the player inhabits is infested with hostile cannibal tribes.

== As a means of survival ==
Cannibalism historically has been practised as a last resort by famine sufferers, and popular culture has portrayed true stories of such acts of cannibalism.

=== Inspired by actual events ===
One often retold event is the story of the survivors of the Uruguayan Air Force Flight 571, which was chronicled in Piers Paul Read's book Alive: The Story of the Andes Survivors (1974), in Alive (1993), the book's film adaptation, and in the documentary Stranded: I've Come from a Plane that Crashed in the Mountains (2008). The story was told again in the 2023 film Society of the Snow. It also inspired the American TV series Yellowjackets (2021–), in which a group of high school students (mostly members of a girls soccer team) who survive a plane crash in a remote area are driven to cannibalism.

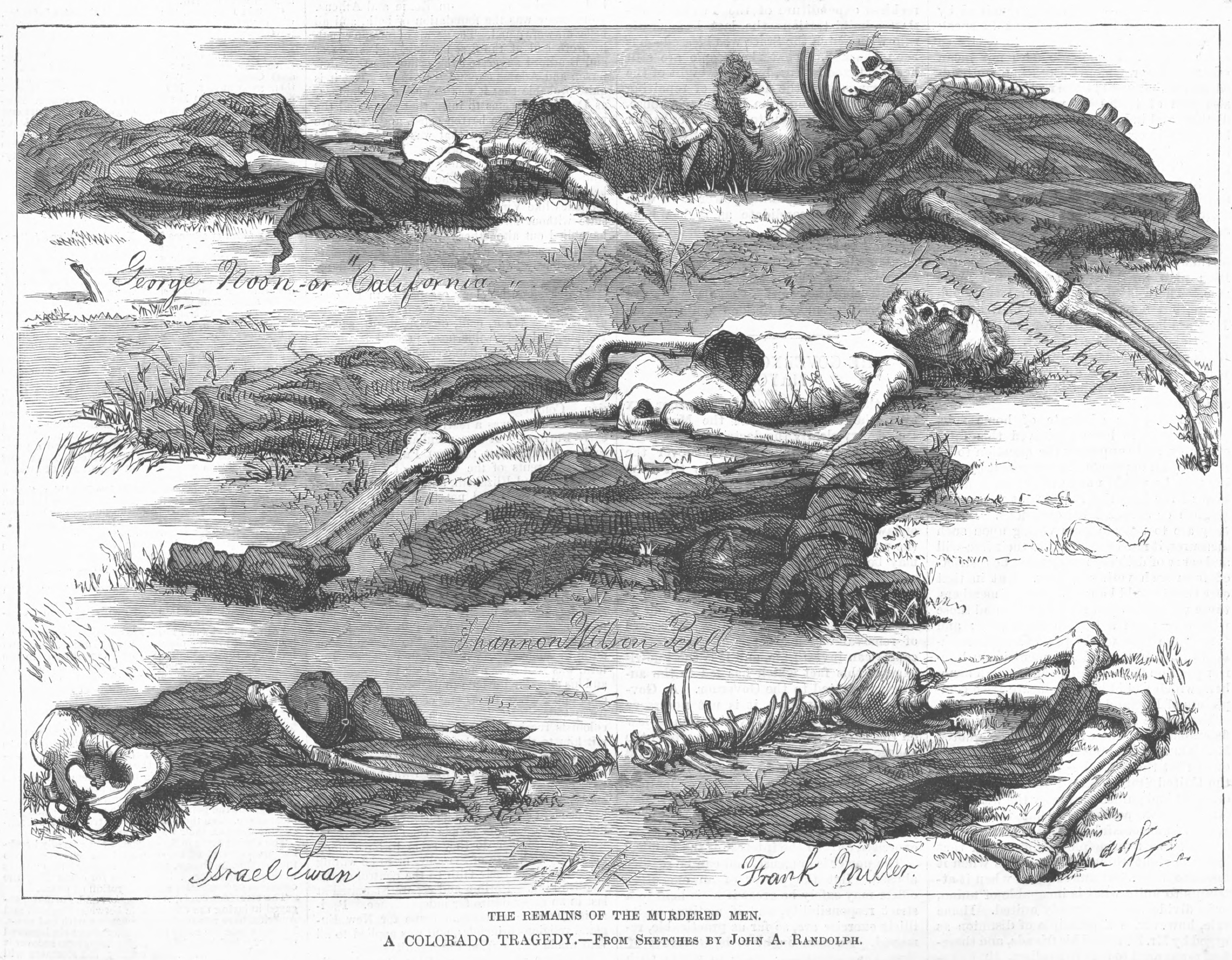
Illustration from Harper's Magazine (1874) of the remains of several men supposedly eaten by Alferd Packer

Similar stories that have provided inspiration for popular culture adaptations are the accounts of Alferd Packer and of the Donner Party (1846–47), both of which involved people who ate human flesh in order to survive snowbound entrapment in the mountains.

- Packer's tale is retold, with artistic liberty, in the film The Legend of Alfred Packer (1980) and in Trey Parker's black comedy Cannibal! The Musical (1993).
- The film Ravenous (1999) combines elements of both stories.
- Stephen King's short story "Survivor Type" (1982) follows a shipwrecked surgeon who, stranded on a remote island, is driven to eat his own body parts in order to survive, using some heroin he was smuggling as anaesthetic.
- In The Buoys' Rupert Holmes-composed pop song "Timothy" (1971), two trapped miners are implied to have eaten their companion. "Timothy" was banned on many radio stations, but rose to no. 17 on the Billboard charts.

Several works are based on the real-life cannibal convict Alexander Pearce:

- The Australian novel For the Term of His Natural Life (1874) by Marcus Clarke uses the historical events in Tasmania surrounding the cannibal convict Alexander Pearce as background.
- Dying Breed (2008) is a fictional horror film about Pearce's cannibal decedents.
- The Last Confession of Alexander Pearce (2008) is a biographic film about Pearce
- Van Diemen's Land (2009) is a biographic film about Pearce
- In the Mad Men series' penultimate episode "The Milk and Honey Route" (airdate 10 May 2015), a veteran at the American Legion Hall explains that he and two fellow members of their original nine-9-man unit survived the Battle of Hürtgen Forest by "bouncing" four German soldiers.

In the first season of the TV show The Terror (2018), as in the novel it is based on, some characters eat others to survive in the Arctic, as part of a fictionalized retelling of Franklin's lost expedition.

Cannibalism during famines has been repeatedly reported throughout China's long history, including during the large-scale famine that resulted from the Great Leap Forward (1958–1962). This traumatic experience has been interpreted as inspiration for Yu Hua's short story "Classical Love" (1988). The story is set in Imperial China and tells how, during a severe famine, a man sells his wife and their ten-year-old daughter to a butcher who then kills them in order to sell their flesh. Another woman is dismembered alive in the back room of a tavern for the benefit of the customers who are served parts of her roasted leg. Oral accounts and folktales describing how "the flesh of young women and children" was sold at meat markets and inns and how naked women were "butchered for food" by innkeepers who had bought them did indeed circulate during the Northern Chinese Famine of 1876–1879 and various earlier famines, serving as inspiration for the story. But while these historical accounts sometimes motivated such acts as voluntary self-sacrifices of "filial" women who gave their lives to earn money for the survival of their parents or parents-in-law, Yu Hua depicts "the inexplicable cruelty and sheer horror" of such acts without any moral palliation.

=== In post-apocalyptic settings ===
Various post-apocalyptic narratives have also featured cannibalism as a means of survival. The French film Delicatessen (1991) is set in an apartment block led by a butcher who deals with the food crisis by luring new tenants to the apartment, killing them, and serving them as meat to the other residents.

In Max Brooks' post-apocalyptic zombie horror novel World War Z (2006), American survivors head north into Canada to escape the undead, and are forced to cannibalize their dead in order to survive the harsh winters.

Some of the survivors in Cormac McCarthy's novel The Road (2006) and its 2009 film adaptation practice cannibalism, as persistent and ubiquitous atmospheric ash has eliminated virtually all other sources of food. A scene in which the protagonist and his son discover a baby roasted over an open fire was edited from the film, but appears in the book and in some versions of the film's trailer.

A group of cannibals appear in the graphic novel The Walking Dead by Robert Kirkman and in the TV adaptation, at Terminus. The group, generally referred to as The Hunters, turned to cannibalizing other survivors due to their inability to hunt other prey or scavenging food. It is implied that the group started out by eating their own children in their desperation to survive, defending the decision by stating that the same occurs among animals in times of famine.

Cannibalistic marauders also feature in the 2008 film Doomsday, which is set in a future Scotland devastated by a deadly virus and the resulting quarantine.

In the TV series The 100, a society of humans forced to live in a bunker to escape the effects of nuclear radiation has to resort to cannibalism for one year as their only other source of protein (a soybean crop) is killed by a fungus and takes one year to regrow. The eating of the human meat is depicted on screen. Furthermore, it is stated that in the show's history a group of humans living in space after a nuclear war has to resort to cannibalism due to an event known as "the blight."

== Unaware cannibals ==
Depictions of cannibalism sometimes involve people who are unaware of their act, being served human flesh by an often murderous host.

- The fictional barber Sweeney Todd has been featured since 1846 in many books and stage productions and modern popular media, murdering patrons whom a neighbouring shopkeeper would bake into meat pies for unsuspecting customers.
- In Arthur C. Clarke's short story, "The Food of the Gods" (1964), a synthesized-food corporation produces the "Ambrosia Plus" line of dishes, designed as a synthetic copy of human flesh, forcing competitors out of business and sparking a congressional investigation.
- A famous cinematic example is the science fiction film Soylent Green (1973), based on Harry Harrison's novel Make Room! Make Room! (1966). In the movie, the Soylent Corporation produces rations of small green wafers in response to a food crisis. These wafers are advertised as being produced from "high-energy plankton" but are actually the processed remains of human corpses. The film has been the subject of numerous parodies and popular culture references. This theme has been used in parodies and black comedies for its humorous value of dramatic irony. It is not present in the novel, which simply deals with issues of overpopulation and poverty rather than catastrophic environmental damage.
- The musical parody The Rocky Horror Picture Show (1975) has a scene in which Dr. Frank N. Furter kills the character Eddie and serves his flesh to his dinner guests.
- In the film Eating Raoul (1982), a prudish married couple, Paul and Mary Bland, resort to killing and robbing affluent swingers to earn money for their dream restaurant. Their eventual partner in crime and blackmailer, Raoul, plans to kill Paul and run away with Mary. After she kills Raoul to save herself and her husband, they are scheduled to prepare dinner for a real estate agent helping them open their restaurant. With no main dish or time to shop, they prepare Raoul as the main course for the unwitting agent.
- In Fannie Flagg's novel Fried Green Tomatoes at the Whistle Stop Cafe (1987), investigators are unknowingly fed the barbecued ribs of a man whose murder they are investigating.
- In the film Eat the Rich (1987), a disgruntled waiter and his friends kill the management and arrogant clientele of a restaurant and feed the bodies to unsuspecting customers.
- The 1993 Hong Kong thriller The Untold Story portrays a fictionalized version of the real Eight Immortals Restaurant murders.
- In the "Scott Tenorman Must Die" episode (first aired 2001) of the animated sitcom South Park, Eric Cartman takes revenge on 9th grader bully Scott Tenorman by having his parents killed, cooking them into chili, and feeding them to him.
- The Criminal Minds episode "Lucky" (aired 2007) revolves around a cannibalistic serial killer who secretly serves the meat of his victims to the unsuspecting customers of his diner and, in a disturbing ironic twist, to a search party looking for a missing girl whose flesh they have just consumed.
- In Game of Thrones season 6, episode 10, "The Winds of Winter" (aired 2016), Arya Stark avenges Walder Frey's slaughter of her family members at the Red Wedding by serving the unwitting Frey meat pie, then revealing she had killed his sons Lothar and Black Walder, and baked them into the pie he has been eating, before cutting Walder's throat. In contrast, in the show's source material, George R. R. Martin's books, Wyman Manderly, the Lord of White Harbor, avenges the Freys' murder of his son Wendell by serving at a wedding feast meat pies made from three dead Freys.

== Sensual cannibalism ==
- In the 1982 West German thriller film The Fan, a disturbed teenage girl falls in love with a pop singer who has sex with her but then immediately wants to leave her, treating her as just another groupie. She kills him, carves up his body, and eats him piece by piece. The film was controversial not only because of the cannibalism, but also because of the "unabashed nudity" of 16-year-old Désirée Nosbusch.
- In the French film Trouble Every Day (2001), cannibalism is portrayed purely as a sexual act. Director Claire Denis explores the ability to love as a hunger, with the portrayal of characters that seem to have originated from a "diseased culture".
- The 2009 American comedy horror Jennifer's Body tells the story of a young woman who seduces, kills, and eats a man under the influence of a demon.
- Love cannibalism is also a theme of Anthropophilie (2015), a short film by Selina Sondermann.
- Luca Guadagnino's Bones and All (2022) portrays a pair of young cannibals in love.

== As a cause or consequence of murder ==
Some artistic and entertainment works are influenced by the morbid fascination surrounding real-life cases of cannibal murderers or otherwise explore the connection between murder and eating often inherent in cannibalism.

The Armin Meiwes cannibalism case in Germany inspired several feature films. Grimm Love (2007) tells of an American criminal psychology student who studies cannibal killer Oliver Hartwin for her thesis. Hartwin fulfills his dream of eating a willing victim found on the Internet, and is modelled on Meiwes, whose complaints that his personal rights were violated led to a ban on the film in Germany. The story of Cannibal (2006) closely follows the original case of Meiwes and was banned in Germany for the same reason. Rosa von Praunheim's Dein Herz in Meinem Hirn (Your Heart in My Brain) and Ulli Lommel's Diary of a Cannibal (2006) also depict the case.

Many heavy metal, death metal and grindcore bands and horrorcore rappers discuss cannibalism in their songs or depict it in the cover art of their albums, because of the act's taboo nature. A number of bands and works were inspired by the Meiwes case, such as:

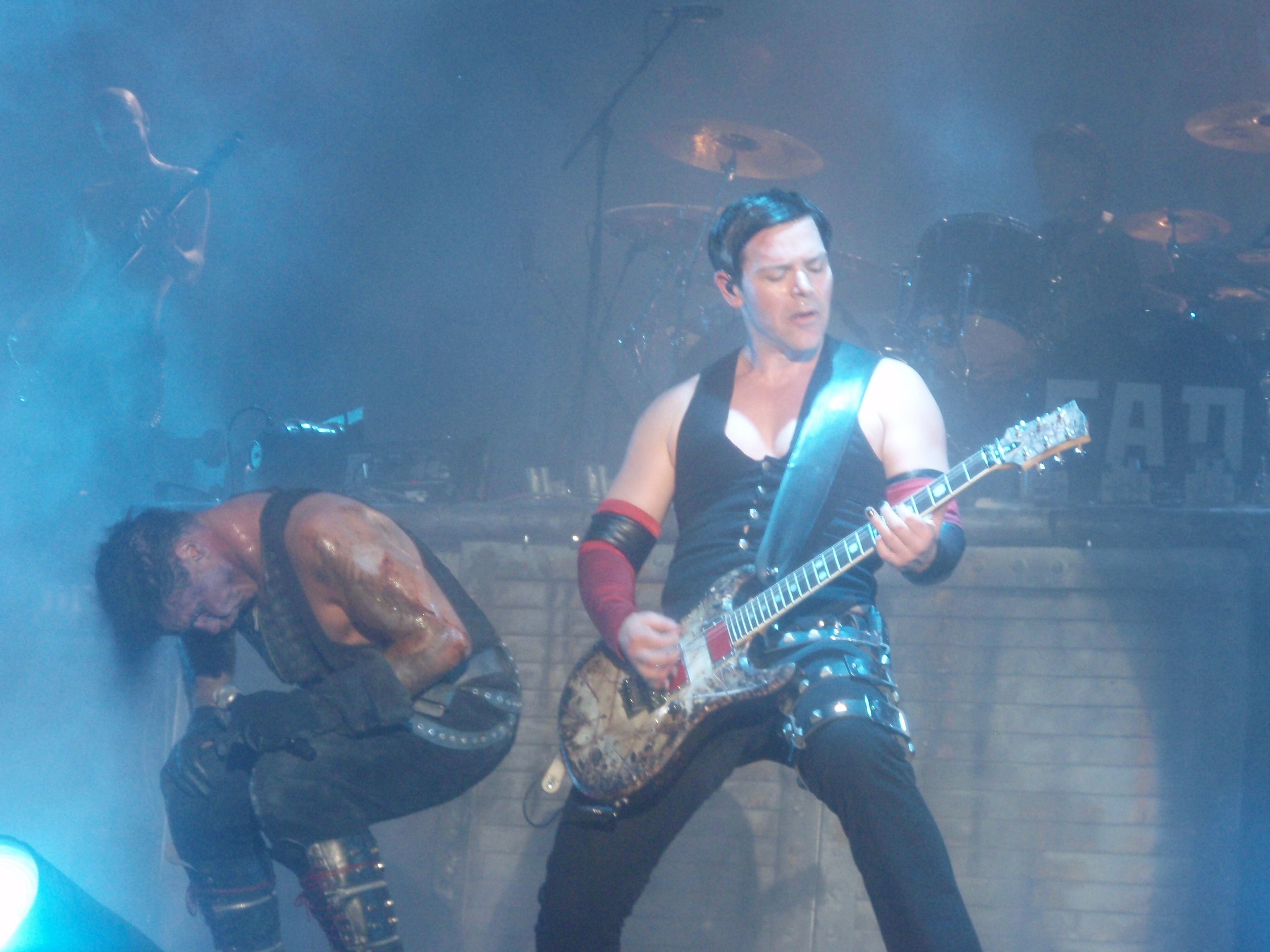
Rammstein made a song about the fascinating sickness of the Meiwes case

- Rammstein's single "Mein Teil" (2004) features the refrain "you are what you eat". Vocalist Till Lindemann said "It's so sick that it becomes fascinating and there just has to be a song about it."
- "The Wüstenfeld Man Eater" by American death/thrash metal band Macabre
- "Eaten" by Bloodbath
- "Let Me Taste Your Flesh" by Avulsed
- "Cannibal Anthem" by the German electro-industrial project Wumpscut
- "Menschenfresser (Eat Me)" by Suicide Commando
- "Human Consumption" by hip-hop artist Necro refers to the incident
- The title of the Marilyn Manson album Eat Me, Drink Me (2007) was inspired by the case

A number of significant works were based on the activities of Ed Gein, who served as inspiration for the characters:

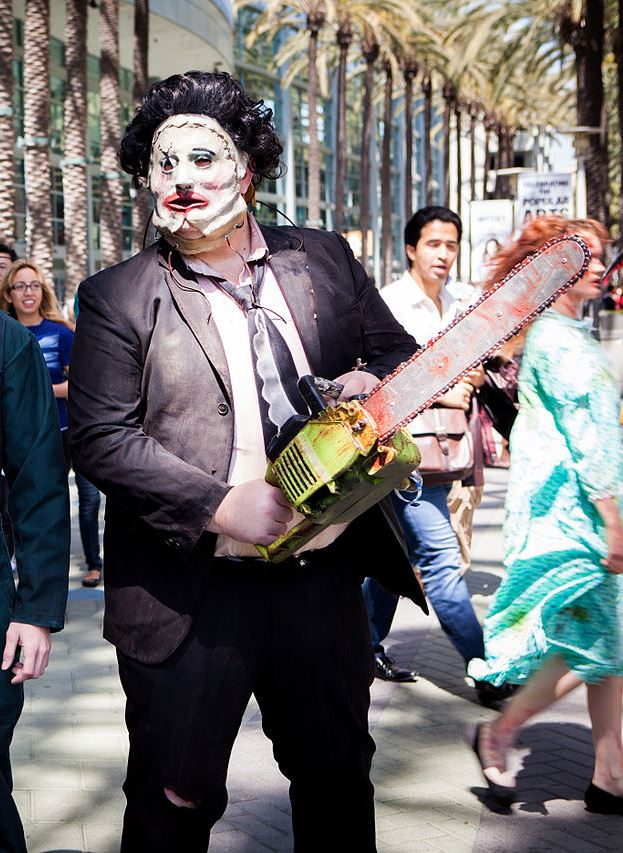
Cosplayer dressed as the cannibal Leatherface with his characteristic chainsaw (2015)

- Norman Bates in Psycho (1960)
- Ezra Cobb in Deranged (1974)
- Leatherface in The Texas Chain Saw Massacre (1974) and its sequels

A notable cannibalistic serial killer from fiction is Hannibal Lecter, a character created by author Thomas Harris. Lecter appears in the novels: Red Dragon (1981), The Silence of the Lambs (1988), Hannibal (1999) and Hannibal Rising (2006). Lecter was a background character in Red Dragon, and his cannibalism was not a plot point. Public fascination with the character led Harris to feature him in the sequel The Silence of the Lambs, where his cannibalism became a central feature of his character. The film based on the novel won several major Academy Awards, which rarely are awarded to horror films.

Two of the main protagonists of Poppy Z. Brite's horror novel Exquisite Corpse (1996) are gay serial killers. One of them, inspired by real-life Jeffrey Dahmer, has a taste for human flesh which he ultimately passes on to the other.

Lucy Rose's debut novel The Lamb (2025) is written from the perspective of a young girl growing up in an English household where people described as "strays" are routinely killed and consumed. When another woman enters her mother's life, the dynamic shifts and the girl has to confront the question whether, rather than eating others, she or her friends may become food themselves. Described as part of a trend of "femgore" literature and "feminist body horror", the novel was shortlisted for the 2025 Books Are My Bag Readers' Awards.

== In science fiction ==
Works of science fiction sometimes include elements of cannibalism that serve purposes different from those already discussed.

- Last and First Men (1930) by Olaf Stapledon mentions that the 18th Men, a particularly advanced human species, eat their dead.
- The Sharing of Flesh (1968), a short story by Poul Anderson, depicts a planet where the colonists exhibit a mutation preventing puberty in males unless they be given a boost of exogenous testosterone. A rite of passage has developed where boys of the right age eat flesh of an adult male to jumpstart their sexual development.
- The post-apocalyptic novel Lucifer's Hammer (1977) by Larry Niven and Jerry Pournelle features a band of survivors from a comet impact who turn to cannibalism not only as a means of food, but also as a way of binding members to their group.
- In Gene Wolfe's series The Book of the New Sun (1980–1983), cannibalism and drugs are used to gain the memories of the dead.
- Donald Kingsbury's Courtship Rite (serialized in 1982) explores a human culture planted on a world whose biochemistry is toxic to humans. Cannibalism is an essential part of both social and religious life, as food is a precious commodity and the only source of meat are other humans, often babies and young children who are weeded out in a highly competitive selection process. Throughout the novel, the consumption of human flesh is treated as a normal and uncontroversial act, not a matter of ethical concern.
- A parasitic infection causes its victims to become cannibals in Scott Westerfeld's novel Peeps (2005).

== As a metaphor or trope ==
"Diary of a Madman" is a 1918 short story written by Lu Xun, credited as the first Chinese modern short story. It concerns a "madman" who begins to see "cannibalism" in his community, his family, and ultimately between the lines of Confucian text. The use of cannibalism becomes the catalyst of satire and critique of Chinese society's dependence on Confucian idealism. An effect of this idealism, to Lu Xun, was the cannibalizing of the family.

The American novelist Toni Morrison uses the "jungle savage" stereotype and imagery to present "polemic points about racial, sexual, and class conflicts in American, African American, and Black Atlantic culture". Her novels The Bluest Eye (1970), Sula (1973), and Beloved (1987) use cannibalism in the particular context of black narratives in the white "standard".

The Bluest Eye tells the story of a young African-American girl, Pecola Breedlove, who is regarded as ugly according to the white beauty standard. As a result, she develops an inferiority complex, fuelling her desire for blue eyes and whiteness. At one point, she purchases a few pieces of candy called Mary Janes, which feature a picture of a beautiful little white girl with blue eyes, called Mary Jane. Pecola fixates on this fictional girl:

Each pale yellow wrapper has a picture on it. A picture of little Mary Jane, for whom the candy is named. Smiling white face. Blond hair in gentle disarray, blue eyes looking a her out of a world of clean comfort. The eyes are petulant, mischievous. To Pecola they are simply pretty. She eats the candy, and its sweetness is good. To eat the candy is somehow to eat the eyes, eat Mary Jane. Love Mary Jane. Be Mary Jane.

Morrison uses symbolic cannibalism to represent Pecola's "entrapment in a globalized capitalist system in which intensively plantation-farmed sugar and its teeth-rotting products are signs of Third World peoples' exploitation both as workers and consumers."

Beloved tells the story of a formerly enslaved family whose home is haunted by a malevolent spirit. The titular character, Beloved, "had two dreams: exploding and being swallowed." Morrison again uses the cannibal trope to characterize the exploitation and inner exploration of slavery.

== Controversy ==
In 2020 controversy over the racist themes of the cartoon depiction of the missionaries and cannibals problem led the AQA exam board to withdraw a text book containing the cartoon.

== See also ==
- Cannibal film
- Cannibalism in literature
- Child cannibalism § In popular culture
