= List of horror films of 1980 =

A number of horror films were released in 1980.

Title	Director(s)	Cast	Country	Notes	Ref.
Alien Dead	Fred Olen Ray		United States		
Alligator	Lewis Teague	Robert Forster, Robin Riker	United States		
Altered States	Ken Russell	William Hurt, Drew Barrymore, Francis X. McCarthy	United States		
Antropophagus	Joe D'Amato	George Eastman, Tisa Farrow, Saverio Vallone	Italy	Alternative title(s): Antropophagus; The Grim Reaper; Man Eater; The Savage Island	
The Attic	George Edwards	Carrie Snodgress, Ray Milland, Rosemary Murphy	United States		
The Awakening	Mike Newell	Charlton Heston, Susannah York, Jill Townsend	United States; United Kingdom		
The Babysitter	Peter Medak	Patty Duke, William Shatner	United States	Television film	
Beyond Evil	Herb Freed	John Saxon, Lynda Day George, Michael Dante	United States		
The Boogeyman	Ulli Lommel	Suzanna Love, John Carradine, Felicite Morgan	United States		
Cannibal Apocalypse	Antonio Margheriti	Giovanni Lombardo Radice, John Saxon, Wallace Wilkinson	Italy; Spain		
Cannibal Holocaust	Ruggero Deodato	Robert Kerman, Carl Gabriel Yorke, Francesca Ciardi	Italy		
Cardiac Arrest	Murray Mintz	Max Gail, Gary Goodrow, Mike Paul Chan	United States		
The Changeling	Peter Medak	George C. Scott, Trish Van Devere, Melvyn Douglas	Canada		
The Children	Max Kalmanowicz	Martin Shakar, Gil Rogers	United States		
Christmas Evil	Lewis Jackson	Brandon Maggart, Gus Salud, Jeffrey DeMunn	United States		
City of the Living Dead	Lucio Fulci	Christopher George, Catriona MacColl, Michele Soavi	Italy		
Contamination	Luigi Cozzi	Ian McCulloch, Louise Marleau, Marino Masé,	Italy; West Germany		
The Curse of King Tut's Tomb	Philip Leacock	Eva Marie Saint, Raymond Burr	United Kingdom; United States	Television film	
Death Ship	Alvin Rakoff	George Kennedy, Richard Crenna, Nick Mancuso	United Kingdom; Canada		
Demented	Arthur Jeffreys	Sallee Elyse, Harry Reems	United States		
Don't Answer the Phone!	Robert Hammer	James Westmoreland, Flo Gerrish, Ben Frank	United States		
Don't Go in the House	Joseph Ellison	Dan Grimaldi, Robert Osth, Ruth Dardick	United States		
Eaten Alive!	Umberto Lenzi	Janet Agren, Mel Ferrer, Ivan Rassimov	Italy; Spain		
Effects	Dusty Nelson	Joseph Pilato, Susan Chapek, John Harrison	United States	Alternative title(s): Death's Director; The Manipulator	
Encounters of the Spooky Kind	Sammo Hung	Sammo Hung, Chung Fat, Chan Lung	Hong Kong		
Erotic Nights of the Living Dead	Joe D'Amato	Laura Gemser	Italy		
Fade to Black	Vernon Zimmerman	Dennis Christopher, Linda Kerridge, Tim Thomerson	United States		
The Fog	John Carpenter	Adrienne Barbeau, Hal Holbrook, Janet Leigh	United States		
Friday the 13th	Sean S. Cunningham	Betsy Palmer, Adrienne King, Harry Crosby	United States	First film of Friday the 13th franchise	
Funeral Home	William Fruet	Lesleh Donaldson, Kay Hawtrey	Canada	Alternative title(s): Cries in the Night	
The Godsend	Gabrielle Beaumont	Malcolm Stoddard, Cyd Hayman, Angela Pleasence	United Kingdom		
The Haunting of M	Anna Thomas	Jo Scott Matthews, Nini Pitt, Isolde Cazelet	United States		
He Knows You're Alone	Armand Mastroianni	Don Scardino, Caitlin O'Heaney, Elizabeth Kemp, Tom Hanks	United States		
The Hearse	George Bowers	Trish Van Devere, Joseph Cotten, David Gautreaux	United States		
Hell of the Living Dead	Bruno Mattei	Margit Evelyn Newton, Franco Giraldi, Selan Karay	Italy; Spain		
The House on the Edge of the Park	Ruggero Deodato	David Hess, Annie Belle, Christian Borromeo	Italy		
Humanoids from the Deep	Barbara Peters	Doug McClure, Ann Turkel, Vic Morrow	United States		
Inferno	Dario Argento	Irene Miracle, Leigh McCloskey, Eleonora Giorgi	Italy		
Island Claws	Hernan Cardenas	Robert Lansing, Steve Hanks	United States		
Long Island Cannibal Massacre	Nathan Schiff	John Smihula, Fred Borges, Michael Siegal	United States		
Lost Souls	Mou Tun-fei	Yen Hung, Chen Ming, Chan Shen	Hong Kong		
Macabre	Lamberto Bava	Bernice Stegers, Veronica Zinny, Stanko Molnar	Italy		
Mama Dracula	Boris Szulzinger	Louise Fletcher, Maria Schneider, Marc-Henri Wajnberg	Belgium		
Maniac	William Lustig	Joe Spinell, Fred Borges	United States		
The Monster Club	Roy Ward Baker	Vincent Price, Donald Pleasence, John Carradine	United Kingdom		
Motel Hell	Kevin Connor	Rory Calhoun, Paul Linke, Nancy Parsons	United States		
Mother's Day	Charles S. Kaufman	Nancy Hendrickson, Deborah Luce, Tiana Pierce	United States		
New Years Evil	Emmett Alston	Roz Kelly, Kip Niven, Chris Wallace	United States		
Night of Death	Raphaël Delpard	Ernest Menzer, Denise Montréal, Betty Beckers	France		
Night of the Demon	James C. Watson	Joy Allen, Bob Collins	United States		
The Night of the Hunted	Jean Rollin	Brigitte Lahaie, Rachel Mhas, Vincent Gardère	France		
Nightmare City	Umberto Lenzi	Hugo Stiglitz, Laura Trotter, Maria Rosaria Omaggio	Italy; Mexico; Spain	Alternative title(s): City of the Walking Dead; Invasion by the Atomic Zombies; Invasion de los zombies atómicos	
Nightmares	John D. Lamond	Jenny Neumann, Gary Sweet	Australia	Alternative title(s): Stage Fright	
Patrick Still Lives	Mario Landi	Gianni Dei, Franco Silva, Mariangela Giordano	Italy		
Prom Night	Paul Lynch	Leslie Nielsen, Jamie Lee Curtis, Casey Stevens	Canada	First film of Prom Night film series	
Return of the Wolfman	Paul Naschy	Paul Naschy, Julia Saly, Silvia Aguilar	Spain		
Satan's Slave	Sisworo Gautama Putra	Ali Albar, Simon Cader, Adang Mansyur	Indonesia		
Schizoid	David Paulsen	Klaus Kinski, Marianna Hill	United States		
Sex and Black Magic	Joe D'Amato	Nieves Navarro, Lucia Ramirez, Richard Harrison	Dominican Republic; Italy		
The Shining	Stanley Kubrick	Jack Nicholson, Shelley Duvall, Danny Lloyd	United States; United Kingdom		
Terror Train	Roger Spottiswoode	Ben Johnson, Jamie Lee Curtis, Hart Bochner	Canada		
To All a Good Night	David Hess	Jennifer Runyon, Forrest Swanson, Linda Gentile	United States		
Toxic Zombies	Chuck McCrann	Chuck McCrann, Beverly Shapiro, Dennis Helfend	United States		
The Unseen	Danny Steinmann	Barbara Bach, Sidney Lassick, Stephen Furst	United States		
The Watcher in the Woods	John Hough, Vincent McEveety	Bette Davis, Lynn-Holly Johnson, Kyle Richards	United States		
We're Going to Eat You	Tsui Hark	Han Kuo Tsai, Kao Hsiung, Mel Wong	Hong Kong		
Windows	Gordon Willis	Talia Shire, Joseph Cortese, Elizabeth Ashley	United States		
Without Warning	Greydon Clark	Jack Palance, Martin Landau	United States		
Zombie Holocaust	Marino Girolami, Francesco Martino	Ian McCulloch, Alexandra Cole, Sherry Buchanan	Italy		

== Sources ==
- Browning, John Edgar (2010). Dracula in Visual Media: Film, Television, Comic Book and Electronic Game Appearances, 1921-2010. McFarland. ISBN 978-0-8108-6887-8.
- Chibnall, Steve; Petley, Julian, eds. (2002). British Horror Cinema. New York City, New York: Routledge. ISBN 978-0-415-23003-2.
- Deal, David (2007). Television Fright Films of the 1970s. Jefferson, North Carolina: McFarland. ISBN 978-0-786-42929-5.
- Hardy, Phil, ed. (1995). The Overlook Film Encyclopedia. Vol. 3. Overlook Press. ISBN 0-87951-624-0.
- Heller-Nicholas, Alexandra (2011). Rape-Revenge Films: A Critical Study. McFarland & Company. ISBN 978-0-7864-4961-3.
- Hutchings, Peter (2009). The A to Z of Horror Cinema. Scarecrow Press. ISBN 978-0-8108-6887-8.
- Kay, Glenn; Gordon, Stuart (2008). Zombie Movies: The Ultimate Guide. Chicago Review Press. ISBN 978-1-55652-770-8.
- Muir, John Kenneth (2010). Horror Films of the 1980s. Jefferson, North Carolina: McFarland. ISBN 978-0-786-45501-0.
- O'Brien, Daniel (2003). Spooky Encounters: A Gwailo's Guide to Hong Kong Horror. Manchester: Headpress. ISBN 978-1-900486-31-6.
- Rockoff, Adam (2016) [2002]. Going to Pieces: The Rise and Fall of the Slasher Film, 1978-1986. Jefferson, North Carolina: McFarland. ISBN 978-0-7864-9192-6.
- Stine, Scott Aaron (2015). The Gorehound's Guide to Splatter Films of the 1960s and 1970s. Jefferson, North Carolina: McFarland. ISBN 978-0-786-49140-7.
- Wallace, Amy (2008). The Book of Lists: Horror. HarperCollins. ISBN 978-0-06-153726-4.
- Young, R. G. (2000). The Encyclopedia of Fantastic Film: Ali Baba to Zombies. Hal Leonard Corporation. ISBN 1-55783-269-2.
