= Blood and Plum Blossoms =

Blood and Plum Blossoms (simplified Chinese: 鲜血梅花; traditional Chinese: 鮮血梅花; pinyin: Xiānxuè Méihuā) is a short story by Chinese writer Yu Hua, first published in 1989, that is an unconventional parody of the classic martial arts novel.

Ruan Jinwu was killed 15 years before the main story by persons unknown. His wife charges their son, Ruan Haikuo, with the task of taking revenge on his murderers. The plot of the story revolves around his quest to take revenge.

== Characters ==
- Ruan Jinwu – The greatest swordsman of his generation, Ruan Haikuo's father, and the first named owner of the Plum Blossom Sword.
- Ruan Haikuo – Ruan Jinwu's son and the protagonist. He is not a swordsman, but is presented with the Plum Blossom Sword by his mother at the age of twenty and tasked with hunting down & killing his father's murderers.
- Master Blue Cloud – One of the two people Ruan Haikuo's mother tells him will probably know who killed his father. He was once an active martial artist but has since retired and become a recluse, meditating most of the time.
- White Rain – One of the two people Ruan Haikuo's mother tells him will probably know who killed his father. He also lives as a recluse.
- Lady of the Rouge – An exceptional martial artist, she kills people with poisonous perfume and makeup at a distance. She asks Ruan Haikuo, if he ever runs into Master Blue Cloud, to ask on her behalf where Liu Tian is.
- Black Needle Knight – An amazing martial artist, he is an expert with hidden weapons. When he plucks hair from his head, it immediately hardens into needles, which he throws at his opponents. He asks Ruan Haikuo, if he ever runs into Master Blue Cloud, to find out for him where Li Dong is.
- Liu Tian – A martial artist whom the Lady of the Rouge has a grudge against; he is killed by her. He was one of the two people who murdered Ruan Haikuo's father.
- Li Dong – A martial artist whom the Black Needle Knight has a grudge against. He is killed by the Black Needle Knight. He was one of the two people who murdered Ruan Haikuo's father.

== Synopsis ==
=== Setting ===
Blood and Plum Blossoms is set in the fairytale China of ages past, the Jianghu. This is a volatile world of powerful martial artists and wandering swordsmen.

=== Plot ===
The story begins with Ruan Haikuo 5 years old and his mother discovering her husband, Ruan Jinwu, dead in the weeds outside their house. The story then flashes forward 15 years. When Ruan Haikuo turns 20, his mother gives him his father's famous blade, the Plum Blossom Sword. It is so named because once it has slain someone a single, exquisite plum blossom forms on the blade.

When his mother gives it to him she tells him that there are 99 plum blossoms on the blade (it had killed 99 people) and when Ruan Haikuo kills his father's murderer it will bloom its hundredth. After presenting Ruan Haikuo with the sword she then tells him that Master Blue Cloud and White Rain are the only people who could possibly know who killed his father. She then sends him out of the house to begin his journey, and she immolates herself in their family home giving Ruan Haikuo nowhere to return to.

Ruan Haikuo wanders for some time and eventually comes to the house of the Lady of the Rouge, but she cannot give him any information about finding Master Blue Cloud or White Rain; however, she asks that if he should find Master Blue Cloud to ask him where she can find Liu Tian. Ruan then keeps wandering and eventually encounters the Black Needle Knight, who cannot give him any information about Master Blue Cloud or White Rain. The Black Needle Knight does ask that if Ruan ever finds Master Blue Cloud that Ruan ask about the whereabouts of Li Dong.

Ruan then wanders and eventually comes to a ferry where he meets White Rain, but does not recognize him. White Rain recognizes Ruan by the Plum Blossom Sword that he carries. After taking the ferry & speaking briefly they go their separate ways.

After more wandering Ruan finally comes to a temple where Master Blue Cloud is and asks about the locations of Liu Tian and Li Dong. Master Blue Cloud responds, telling Ruan that they are both on the way to the swordsmanship tournament at Mt. Hua. Then, before Ruan can ask about his father, Master Blue Cloud states that he only ever answers two questions at a time and leaves suddenly.

Ruan wanders again and, by chance, meets the Lady of the Rouge and the Black Needle Knight once more and gives them the information that they desire about the locations Li Dong and Liu Tian, respectively. He then keeps wandering.

Finally, three years later Ruan meets White Rain and recognizes White Rain as one of the two martial artists he was sent to find. White Rain then tells him that his father's murderers were Liu Tian and Li Dong who were killed three years ago on their way to the swordsmanship tournament at Mt. Hua by the Lady of the Rouge and the Black Needle Knight, respectively. As Ruan stands there in shock internalizing that his quest is already completed, White Rain takes the Plum Blossom Sword from Ruan and draws it from its sheath, revealing that the blade is covered with spots of rust (rather than plum blossoms).

== Interpretation ==
One interpretation is the possibility of Blood and Plum Blossoms being a meta-narrative in the wuxia genre. Thus, since the story is peppered with phrases suggesting that Ruan Haikuo is wandering for an indeterminate length of time and that the people and buildings he passes look the same, this is a story that reflects the meta-conventions of the genre (only the martial artists are really important, non-martial artists blend into the background, the story-line is theoretically endlessly extend-able with wandering, the protagonist is searching for a master who will assist him in taking revenge, etc.).

Another possible interpretation is that this is a kind of perverse satire on the wuxia genre. The description of the Lady of the Rouge alludes to a woman who wears too much makeup, while the description of the Black Needle Knight conjures the image of a balding old man who, funnily enough, uses his hair as darts. These notes and the twist ending poke fun at the normally stoic genre and show the absurdity of the actions of the characters.

It is clear that Yu Hua is playing with the conventions of the wuxia genre as he has done to other genres, notably the Scholar and Beauty genre in Classical Love.
