= Esa Mujer =

Esa Mujer, meaning "That Woman" in English, may refer to:

- Esa Mujer (album), a 1985 album by Verónica Castro
- Esa mujer (film), a 1969 Spanish film
- Esa mujer (TV series), an Argentine telenovela
