= Eaten Alive! =

1980 Italian horror film directed by Umberto Lenzi

- Italian theatrical release poster
- Italian: Mangiati vivi!
- Directed by: Umberto Lenzi
- Screenplay by: Umberto Lenzi
- Produced by: Luciano Martino; Mina Loy
- Starring: Robert Kerman; Janet Agren; Ivan Rassimov; Paola Senatore; Me Me Lai; Fiamma Maglione; Mel Ferrer
- Cinematography: Federico Zanni
- Edited by: Eugenio Alabiso
- Music by: Roberto Donati; Fiamma Maglione
- Production company: Dana Film
- Release date: 20 March 1980 (Italy)
- Running time: 91 minutes
- Country: Italy

Eaten Alive! (Italian: Mangiati vivi!) is a 1980 Italian cannibal horror film written and directed by Umberto Lenzi and starring Robert Kerman, Janet Ågren, Ivan Rassimov, Paola Senatore, Me Me Lai and Mel Ferrer. Ågren plays a woman searching for her sister after her abduction by a cult in the jungles of New Guinea.

== Plot ==
Sheila Morris is searching for her sister, Diana, who has disappeared in the jungles of New Guinea. Sheila joins up with adventurer Mark Butler, and they encounter many perils during their search. Diana has joined a cult run by a man called Jonas. Jonas physically and sexually abuses his followers and local people alike. In one scene, he rapes Sheila with a dildo covered in snake blood, and decapitates a native. In another, a native widow named Mowara is ritualistically raped after her late husband's body is burned on a pyre. A group, consisting of Mowara, Mark, Sheila and Diana escapes into the jungle, where Diana and Mowara are caught by a group of cannibals, with Diana raped and then both slowly cut up and eaten before being hacked to death, while Mark and Sheila helplessly watch from the cover of the bushes. They quickly escape back to New York when helicopters sent by the authorities come looking for them. Back in the village, the rest of the cult commits ritual suicide, leaving one young female survivor for the authorities to find.

== Cast ==
- Robert Kerman as Mark Butler
- Janet Agren as Sheila Morris
- Ivan Rassimov as Jonas Melvin
- Paola Senatore as Diana Morris
- Me Me Lai as Mowara
- Mel Ferrer as Professor Carter
- Fiamma Maglione as Alma
- Franco Fantasia as Reeves
- Franco Coduti as Karan
- Gerald Grant as Detective Creal
- Jack Teague as Detective Logan
- Carlo Longhi as Dick

== Production ==
Eaten Alive! was part of the cannibal boom and filmed before the release of Cannibal Holocaust. The film uses a more traditional adventure film narrative opposed to the mondo film style of previous cannibal films. The film uses footage taken from other cannibal films, including Lenzi's own Man from the Deep River (1972), Last Cannibal World (1977) and The Mountain of the Cannibal God (1978). The plot of the film was heavily inspired by the 1978 Jonestown massacre.

Filming took place on-location in Sri Lanka, New York City, and Niagara Falls, New York.

== Release ==
The film was released in Italy on March 20, 1980. It was released under the alternative title Doomed to Die in the United States.

== Reception ==
From contemporary reviews, the Monthly Film Bulletin noted that the plotting and staging of the film as "chaotic" while finding that the film was "brightened by occasional moments of unintended hilarity, as when the drugged ambrosia is ritually consumed to the accompaniment of a robust chorus of 'The Battle Hymn of the Republic.'"

From retrospective reviews, the assistant professor Danny Shipka of Louisiana State University described the film as Lenzi capitalizing on public interest in cult leader Jim Jones and referring to it as a "ridiculous film". Online film database AllMovie gave the film a one and a half star out of five rating, noting that the film includes "Stone Age cannibals, a Jim Jones-type cult, hired assassins, and gratuitous animal slaughters thrown onscreen every five minutes just to keep the viewer awake." The review also commented on the themes of the film, stating that "both of the leading characters are given a backstory of having exploited blacks in their Alabama cotton mill, only to lose all their ill-gotten money and – in one case – pay the ultimate price, as one underclass avenges another half a world away. In more talented hands, there could have been a real statement made with this film. As it turns out, the only statement most viewers are likely to come away with is 'yuck.'"

== See also ==
- List of Italian films of 1980
- List of horror films of 1980

== Notes ==
=== References ===
- Shipka, Danny (2011). Perverse Titillation: The Exploitation Cinema of Italy, Spain and France, 1960–1980. Jefferson, NC: McFarland. ISBN 978-0-7864-4888-3.
- Kawin, Bruce F. (2012). Horror and the Horror Film. London: Anthem Press. ISBN 978-0-85728-449-5.
