= Emanuelle and the Last Cannibals =

1977 film by Joe D'Amato

- Italian theatrical release poster
- Directed by: Joe D'Amato
- Screenplay by: Romano Scandariato; Aristide Massaccesi
- Story by: Aristide Massaccesi
- Produced by: Gianfranco Couyoumdjian; Fabrizio De Angelis
- Starring: Laura Gemser; Gabriele Tinti; Susan Scott; Donald O'Brien; Monica Zanchi; Percy Hogan; Annamaria Clementi
- Cinematography: Aristide Massaccesi
- Edited by: Alberto Moriani
- Music by: Nico Fidenco
- Production companies: Fulvia Cinematografica; Gico Cinematografica; Flora Film
- Distributed by: Variety Distribution
- Release date: 1977
- Running time: 93 minutes
- Country: Italy
- Language: Italian

Emanuelle and the Last Cannibals (Italian: Emanuelle e gli Ultimi Cannibali), also known as Trap Them and Kill Them, is a 1977 Italian sexploitation cannibal film directed by Joe D'Amato. The film involves photojournalist Emanuelle (Laura Gemser), who encounters a cannibalistic woman bearing a tattoo of an Amazonian tribe in a mental hospital. Along with Professor Mark Lester (Gabriele Tinti), the two travel to the Amazon with a team to discover the source of the long-thought-extinct tribe that still practices cannibalism today.

The film is an entry in the Black Emanuelle series and features elements of cannibal films which had just gained popularity after the release of Ultimo mondo cannibale (1977). D'Amato referred it in an interview as "a reasonable commercial success, especially abroad".

== Plot ==
In a New York City psychiatric ward, photojournalist Emanuelle (Laura Gemser) learns about a girl there who was found in the Amazon rainforest. Emanuelle discovers that she appears to have been raised by the Apiacá, a tribe of cannibals thought to be lost. She contacts Professor Mark Lester (Gabriele Tinti), the curator at the American Museum of Natural History, and persuades him to come with her to the Amazon.

Upon arrival at the Amazon, they are joined by Isabelle Wilkes (Monica Zanchi), the daughter of the organizer of the expedition, and Sister Angela (Annamaria Clementi), who is going upriver to join a mission. Attacked by a snake, Emanuelle is rescued by hunter Donald McKenzie (Donald O'Brien), who joins the group together with his wife Maggie McKenzie (Nieves Navarro) and their guide Salvatore (Percy Hogan) and informs Sister Angela that her convent has been attacked by what they presume to be cannibals, and that no survivors remain.

The group continues into the jungle, now being watched by Indigenous peoples in hiding. They find a severed head on a stake, and Sister Angela disappears to be found impaled the next morning. Meanwhile, Donald and Maggie attempt to leave the group in an attempt to find a crashed plane containing diamonds. As they stumble upon the plane, they are attacked by a tribe of cannibals. Donald and Maggie are kidnapped. The rest of the group only arrive in time to see it happen. They attempt to find the cannibal village. Upon their arrival, the cannibals kill Salvatore and capture Isabelle. Mark and Emanuelle manage to escape only to watch Donald and Maggie being brutally murdered and Isabelle impregnated by the tribe in preparation for sacrifice. To save Isabelle, Emanuelle paints tribal symbols on her body to convince the natives that she is their water goddess, and carries Isabelle away into the water where Mark is waiting in a motorboat. Shot at by the natives with spears, Mark, Emanuelle and Isabelle still manage to escape unharmed.

== Cast ==
- Laura Gemser as Emanuelle
- Gabriele Tinti as Professor Mark Lester
- Nieves Navarro as Maggie McKenzie
- Donald O'Brien as Donald McKenzie
- Percy Hogan as Salvadore
- Mónica Zanchi (credited as Monica Zanchi) as Isabelle Wilkes
- Annamaria Clementi (credited as Anne Maria Clementi) as Sister Angela
- Geoffrey Copleston as Wilkes

== Production ==
After the release of the film Ultimo mondo cannibale (1977), the Italian film market was open for a new group of cannibal related films. Among them, was Emanuelle and the Last Cannibals, a film in the Black Emanuelle film series with a story co-written, directed and photographed by Joe D'Amato. D'Amato declared that he was "a real copy-cat", and that since "Deodato's film Ultimo mondo cannibale had been so successful we thought about doing something along the same lines commercially."

Fabrizio De Angelis co-produced this film, along with another D'Amato project, Emanuelle and the White Slave Trade. D'Amato said in an interview "Fabrizio and I had a company called Fulvia Cinematografica with which we had intended to produce other films. Instead, when we finished these two, we went our separate ways."

In contrast to some previous entries in the "Black Emanuelle" series, Emanuelle and the Last Cannibals does not contain hardcore pornography sequences.

In a 1990 interview, D'Amato remembered that the film had been shot for the most part around a lake in the vicinity of Rome, and that the team gathered together all of the Filipinos who lived in Rome, or were there on vacation, and paid them to work on set for a week. Make-up man Fabrizio Sforza remembers the lake as being the Lago di Fogliano. According to Sforza, the shoot lasted two and a half weeks "with effects, extras, violence, love scenes. Incredible!"

== Release ==
Emanuelle and the Last Cannibals was passed by Italian censors on 20 October 1977. The film was released in 1977.

The film was released on home video by Twisted Dreams Home Video and under the title Trap Them and Kill Them by Twilight Video. Both releases have a runtime of 93 minutes.

== Reception ==
From contemporary reviews, David Badder (The Monthly Film Bulletin) described the film as "so preposterous as to be almost enjoyable." Badder felt that D'Amato didn't understand his film was unintentionally funny, stating that this idea is "dispelled by [D'Amato's] typically frenetic direction and the solemn tone maintained throughout."

In retrospective reviews, Danny Shipka, author of Perverse Titillation: The Exploitation Cinema of Italy, Spain and France, 1960-1980 described the film as "fairly harmless compared to other cannibal films of the time, with the violence coming in the last 20 minutes." and that the Black Emanuelle series was "pretty much running out of ideas and it definitely shows in this film." Cavett Binion (AllMovie) gave the film a negative review, calling it "merely excruciating tedium punctuated by occasional kinky sex in the first half of the film and cheap, gag-inducing special effects in the second" and that the film was too "gory for softcore fans and too dull for gorehounds, this is basically a film with no target audience whatsoever."

On 5 April 2016, film critic Scout Tafoya of RogerEbert.com included Emanuelle and the Last Cannibals in his video series "The Unloved", where he highlights films which received mixed to negative reviews yet he believes to have artistic value. Describing D'Amato as "the Luchino Visconti of trash" who Roger Ebert would have appreciated, he praised the film for "its egregious excesses, its dimwitted good nature, its commitment to being as happily dumb as possible" and highlighted its positive portrayal of Emanuelle's character and sexuality, as seen when she poses as the tribe's goddess to save Isabelle. Noting its faithfulness to pulp magazine artwork and tropes, Tafoya concludes his assessment by describing the film as "a sweltering collage of beautiful ruin, like D'Amato put everying put everything burning a hole on Italian movie screens into a pan and boiled them into a delicious reduction. The Zack Snyders of the world could take a lesson from D'Amato: feeding our worst selves doesn't have to be a chore. It can be pleasurable".

== See also ==
- List of cult films
- List of Italian films of 1977

== Footnotes ==
=== References ===
- Paul, Louis (2005). Italian Horror Film Directors. McFarland. ISBN 978-0-7864-8749-3.
- Shipka, Danny (2011). Perverse Titillation: The Exploitation Cinema of Italy, Spain and France, 1960-1980. McFarland. ISBN 978-0786448883.
- Stine, Scott Aaron (2001). The Gorehound's Guide to Splatter Films of the 1960s and 1970s. McFarland. ISBN 078649140X.
- Tentori, Antonio (2014). Voglia di guardare. L'eros nel cinema di Joe D'Amato. Bloodbuster. ISBN 978-88-908986-1-7.
