= The Wanting Seed =

1962 novel by Anthony Burgess

- First edition
- Author: Anthony Burgess
- Language: English
- Genre: Dystopian novel
- Publisher: Heinemann
- Publication date: 1962
- Publication place: United Kingdom
- Media type: Print (hardback & paperback)
- Pages: 285 pp

The Wanting Seed is a dystopian novel by the English author Anthony Burgess, written in 1962.

== Theme ==
Although the novel addresses many societal issues, the primary subject is overpopulation and its relation to culture. Religion, government, and history are also addressed. A significant portion of the book is a condemnation of war.

Burgess later wrote, "I have spent the last twenty-five years thinking... that The Wanting Seed could, in my leisurely old age, be expanded to a length worthy of the subject."

== Plot ==
The novel begins by introducing the two protagonists: Tristram Foxe, a history teacher, and his wife, Beatrice-Joanna, a homemaker. They have recently suffered through their young son's death.

Throughout the first portion of the novel, overpopulation is depicted through the limitation and reuse of materials, and extremely cramped living conditions.

There is also active discrimination against heterosexuals, homosexuality being encouraged as a measure against overpopulation. Self-sterilization is also encouraged.

One of the major conflicts of the novel is between Tristram and his brother, Derek. Very much alike at first, Derek chose a different path from Tristram and pretends to be homosexual while in public, to help his career as a government official. Derek has an affair with Beatrice-Joanna, and when she forgets to take her State-provided contraceptives she becomes illegally pregnant. She has sex with her husband, Tristram, and his brother, Derek, within a 24-hour time span, thus the paternity of her twin boys is uncertain.

Life changes as the largely homosexual police ('greyboys') become more repressive, and a mysterious blight spreads across the world threatening food supplies. Tristram is arrested after getting unintentionally mixed up in a protest and spends the next section of the novel in jail.

While he is imprisoned, formerly repressed religion begins to bloom, fertility rituals are endorsed, and the structure of society, as well as government, undergoes radical transformation. Cannibalism is openly practised in much of England. Beatrice-Joanna has run away, and is staying with her sister and brother-in-law in the countryside on their farm, where the blight is affecting even their chickens. She stays there until she delivers her twin sons, when members of the Population Police arrive to take her and her children to the city.

With the help of his cellmate, Tristram escapes and tries to rejoin his wife. He travels across England to his sister-in-law's farm. He is so desperate for food that he briefly joins "a dining club", a rather chaotic affair which provides food (composed of murdered human beings) and orgiastic behavior for its village membership.

His journey eventually takes him to a sort of soup kitchen, where he enlists in the newly recreated army, which has replaced the (largely eaten) greyboys and Population Police. This is the third section of the novel. In the army, Tristram is shipped to an unknown location to fight in the war, though the reader later discovers that he is in Ireland. In his first battle he discovers that there is no real enemy; the purpose of the "war" is population control by winnowing out the socially expendable. Companies, led by junior officers trained to recite patriotic verse, are sent to a made-up Western Front style battlefield to kill each other. Every other member of his unit is shot down as they emerge from their trench, but Tristram slips through the barbed wire surrounding the miniature war zone and begins his journey back to England.

Escaping back into general society, Tristram finds a new job. In his absence, Beatrice-Joanna has been moved to live with Derek. She has also brought the twins (it is implied that Derek is their father) and named them after her two brotherly lovers, Derek and Tristram Foxe.

At the last scene Tristram meets again his wife at Brighton pier.

The book closes with a translation of the final stanza of the French poet Paul Valéry's poem 'Le Cimetière marin'. The quotation clarifies the book's themes:

The wind rises... we must try to live. The immense air opens and closes my book. The wave, pulverised, dares to gush and spatter from the rocks. Fly away, dazzled, blinded pages. Break, waves. Break with joyful waters...

== Cyclical history ==
Often repeated in the novel is the concept that history is cyclical. As Tristram explains in the first few chapters to his slumbering history class, there are three phases: Pelphase, Interphase, and Gusphase.

Pelphase is named after Pelagianism, the theology of Pelagius. The Pelphase is characterised by the belief that people are generally good. Crimes have slight punishment, and the government tries to improve the population. The government works through socialism. According to Tristram "A government functioning in its Pelagian phase commits itself to the belief that man is perfectible, that perfection can be achieved by his own efforts, and that the journey towards perfection is along a straight road." The novel begins – and ends – in Pelphase.

Interphase is the darkening of Pelphase into Gusphase – an "Intermediate" phase. As Tristram explains things, the government grows increasingly disappointed in its population's inability to be truly good, and thus police forces are strengthened and the state becomes Totalitarian. In many respects, Interphase is a finite version of George Orwell's 1984.

"'Brutality!' cried Tristram. ... 'Beatings-up. Secret police. Torture in brightly lighted cellars. Condemnation without trial. Finger-nails pulled out with pincers. The rack. The cold-water treatment. The gouging out of eyes. The firing squad in the cold dawn. And all this because of disappointment. The Interphase.'"

Gusphase is named after Augustinianism, the theology of St. Augustine of Hippo. In short, Gusphase involves the lifting of the Interphase. The leaders begin to realise how horrible they have become, and realise that they are being overly harsh. Therefore, the government relaxes its rules and creates havoc. Tristram describes the Gusphase:

"The orthodox view presents man as a sinful creature from whom no good at all may be expected... It eventually appears that human social behaviour is rather better than any Augustinian pessimist has any right to expect, and so a sort of optimism begins to emerge. And so Pelagianism is reinstated."

== Characters ==
- Tristram Foxe – a plodding but conscientious history teacher
- Beatrice-Joanna Foxe – Tristram's unfaithful wife
- Derek Foxe – Tristram's ambitious and opportunistic brother, becomes head of the Ministry of Infertility
- Mr. Livedog – the term used for God, who is both good and evil. He makes masses of useless life and it is the job of Mr. Homo, his master, to eliminate it. The phrase 'god knows' is replaced by the phrase 'dogsnose'. Note that the first part of the name, "Live(d)", spelled backwards is "(D)evil" and the second part, "dog", spelled backwards is "God".
- Roger Foxe – the deceased baby son of Tristram and Beatrice-Joanna.
- Mavis – Beatrice-Joanna's sister.
- Shonny – Mavis' husband and Beatrice-Joanna's brother-in-law: an insensitive rural radical.
- The Blessed Ambrose Bayley – an unfrocked and alcoholic priest whom Tristam first meets in a bar, then shares a prison cell with.
- The Right Hon. Robert Starling – the effete but harassed Prime Minister of the English-Speaking Union during the initial Pelphase and subsequent Gusphase eras. Retires to comfortable exile while awaiting the political and social wheel to turn again in his favor.
- Captain Loosley – a bumbling Population Police officer who attempts to derail Derek Foxe's civil service career.
- The Right Hon. George Ockham – the new Prime Minister following the entrance into Gusphase.

== Reception ==
A review in Kirkus Reviews said that the novel's "starting pace is fast and pointed, but this slows to a crawl when wit becomes predictable silliness".

== See also ==
- Brave New World
- Cannibalism in popular culture
- Malthusianism
