= Massimo Foschi =

Italian actor and voice actor

- Born: Massimo Quinto Foschi; 2 January 1938 (age 88); Forlì, Italy
- Occupations: Actor; voice actor
- Years active: 1964–present
- Children: Marco Foschi

Massimo Quinto Foschi (born 2 January 1938) is an Italian actor and voice actor.

== Biography ==
Born in Forlì, Foschi began his career as an actor at some point during the 1960s. He appeared in over 22 films since 1966 and also worked extensively as a theatre actor alongside colleagues such as Lamberto Puggelli and Ottavia Piccolo. On screen, his major role was in the 1977 film Jungle Holocaust and he often made collaborations with Gian Maria Volonté.

Foschi also works as a voice actor. He is famous locally and worldwide for voicing Darth Vader in the Italian dub of the Star Wars film franchise. One of his earliest appearances as a voice actor is in the 1965 redub of Orson Welles' Citizen Kane, in which he dubbed several background characters. Foschi dubbed Gregory Peck, Alan Rickman, Donald Sutherland, Rutger Hauer, Laurence Olivier and Lance Henriksen in a select number of their movies.

=== Personal life ===
Foschi is the father of actor Marco Foschi (born 1977).

== Filmography ==
=== Cinema ===
- Be Sick... It's Free (1968)
- Investigation of a Citizen Above Suspicion (1970)
- La signora delle camelie (1971)
- Brother Sun, Sister Moon (1972)
- Giordano Bruno (1973)
- La Cecilia (1974)
- Young Lucrezia (1974)
- L'Orlando Furioso (1975)
- Holocaust 2000 (1977)
- La tigre è ancora viva: Sandokan alla riscossa! (1977)
- Jungle Holocaust (1977)
- Nine Guests for a Crime (1977)
- Men or Not Men (1980)
- Il Principe di Homburg (1983)
- Notti e Nebbie (1984)
- Otello (1986)
- Tartarughe dal becco d'ascia (2000)
- Italian Dream (2008)
- Pandemia (2011)
- The Ideal City (2012)
- Una nobile causa (2016)

=== Television ===
- Il primogenito (1964)
- Vita di Dante (1965)
- Processo di famiglia (1968)
- Cocktail Party (1969)
- Le mani sporche (1978)
- The Merchant of Venice (1979)
- Romulus (2022)

== Dubbing roles ==
=== Animation ===
- Plenipotentiary in Space Pirate Captain Harlock

=== Live action ===
- Darth Vader in Star Wars: Episode IV – A New Hope
- Darth Vader in Star Wars: Episode V – The Empire Strikes Back
- Darth Vader in Star Wars: Episode VI – Return of the Jedi
- Darth Vader in Star Wars: Episode III – Revenge of the Sith
- Darth Vader in Rogue One: A Star Wars Story
- President Coriolanus Snow in The Hunger Games
- President Coriolanus Snow in The Hunger Games: Catching Fire
- President Coriolanus Snow in The Hunger Games: Mockingjay – Part 1
- President Coriolanus Snow in The Hunger Games: Mockingjay – Part 2
- Robert Thorn in The Omen
- Nimrod in The Bible: In the Beginning...
- Etienne of Navarre in Ladyhawke
- Winston Zeddemore in Ghostbusters
- The Monster in Young Frankenstein
- Muhammad Ahmad in Khartoum
- Hans Gruber in Die Hard
- Bishop in Aliens
- Leon Trotsky in The Assassination of Trotsky
- Cadet Moses Hightower in Police Academy
- Cadet Moses Hightower in Police Academy 2: Their First Assignment
- John "Dr. Death" Bishop in Child's Play
- Ben Richards in The Running Man
- Homer Simpson in The Day of the Locust
