= Zombie Holocaust =

- Italian theatrical release poster
- Italian: Zombi Holocaust
- Directed by: Marino Girolami
- Screenplay by: Romano Scandariato
- Story by: Fabrizio De Angelis
- Produced by: Gianfranco Couyoumdjian; Fabrizio De Angelis
- Starring: Ian McCulloch; Alexandra Delli Colli; Sherry Buchanan; Peter O'Neal; Donald O'Brien
- Cinematography: Fausto Zuccoli
- Edited by: Alberto Moriani
- Music by: Nico Fidenco
- Production companies: Flora Film; Fulvia Film; Gico Cinematografica
- Distributed by: Flora Film; Medua Distribuzione
- Release date: April 10, 1980 (Turin)
- Running time: 89 minutes
- Country: Italy
- Box office: 300 million lire

Zombie Holocaust (Italian: Zombi Holocaust, also known as Doctor Butcher M.D.) is a 1980 Italian horror film directed by Marino Girolami, and starring Ian McCulloch, Alexandra Delli Colli, Sherry Buchanan and Donald O'Brien. The film is about a team of scientists who follow a trail of corpses in New York to a remote Indonesian island where they meet a mad doctor (O'Brien) who performs experiments on both the living and dead in his laboratory.

The film combines elements of the zombie and cannibal film subgenres. It was released in Italy on March 28, 1980.

== Plot ==
In New York City, a hospital worker is found to have been devouring bodies in the morgue. Morgue assistant and anthropology expert Lori discovers he was from the Maluku Islands where she grew up. Dr. Peter Chandler investigates, and he and Lori discover that similar corpse mutilations have occurred in other city hospitals, where immigrants from this region are working.

Peter leads an expedition to the islands to investigate, where he liaises with Dr. Obrero. Included are his assistant George, George's eager journalist girlfriend Susan, Lori, local boatsman Molotto assigned by Obrero, and three guides. The crew is hunted by cannibals and zombies, the latter created by the sinister Obrero, who is experimenting with corpses.

Lori is accepted as queen of the cannibals and sends them off against the mad scientist and his zombie army.

== Cast ==
- Ian McCulloch as Dr. Peter Chandler
- Alexandra Delli Colli as Lori Ridgeway
- Sherry Buchanan as Susan Kelly
- Peter O'Neal as George Harper
- Donald O'Brien as Dr. Obrero
- Dakar as Molotto
- Walter Patriarca as Dr. Dreylock
- Joseph P. Persaud as Toran
- Romano Scandariato as Prof. Stafford
- Linda Fumis as Nurse

== Production ==
Zombie Holocaust was shot on-location in Latina, Lazio, Italy and New York City, with studio interiors shot at De Paolis Studios in Rome. The film reused several cast, crew, and locations from Lucio Fulci's Zombi 2, released the year prior and also produced by Gianfranco Couyoumdjian and Fabrizio De Angelis. Parts of Nico Fidenco's score were recycled from his music for Emanuelle and the Last Cannibals.

== Release ==
Zombi Holocaust was distributed in by Flora Film in Turin, Italy on April 10, 1980. It grossed a total of 300 million Italian lira.

=== Original U.S. release ===
It was released in the United States in 1982 in modified form, under the title Doctor Butcher M.D. The Doctor Butcher cut has a runtime of 82 minutes, while the original Zombie Holocaust cut is 89 minutes. The Doctor Butcher cut features a new prologue which consists of footage from an unreleased film shot by director Roy Frumkes, intercut with footage of the zombies from the film and footage of a swinging sign outside a building that says "Doctor Butcher M.D." This cut also features a new soundtrack replacing the original score by Nico Fidenco.

In addition to the title Zombie Holocaust, the film has since been released under various other English titles, including Island of the Last Zombies, Queen of the Cannibals and Zombie 3.

=== Home media ===
The Doctor Butcher M.D. version of the film was originally released on home video by Wizard Films on VHS. When the film was released on DVD in 2002, Shriek Show released the film under its original form as Zombie Holocaust. The US film's prologue and the Doctor Butcher M.D. trailer would be included as extras on the DVD. The film was made available both separately and in a triple feature package. The Zombie Pack Vol. 2 contains Zombie Holocaust, Burial Ground: The Nights of Terror and Flesheater.

Shriek Show released the film on Blu-ray for the first time in the U.S. on June 28, 2011, with 88 Films giving the film its UK Blu-ray debut in 2015.

In 2016, Severin Films issued a deluxe edition two-disc Blu-ray that included both Zombie Holocaust and Doctor Butcher M.D., as well as a multitude of bonus features. The first 5,000 copies of this edition also included a replica of the "barf bag" given out at some original screenings of Doctor Butcher M.D. Severin later released both cuts of the film on Ultra HD Blu-ray.

== Critical reception ==
In The Zombie Movie Encyclopedia, academic Peter Dendle stated that "Some of the gore effects are quite good, but other than that the movie is a stock accumulation of familiar motifs." Bloody Disgusting rated it 5/5 stars and recommended it to fans of Italian gore films.

Glenn Kay of Zombie Movies: The Ultimate Guide referred to it as "a bad movie; for Italian zombie gore fans only." Danny Shipka, author of Perverse Titillation: The Exploitation Cinema of Italy, Spain and France, 1960–1980, noted that Zombie Holocaust showed how quickly the zombie subgenre "degenerated into stupidity" and that the film "fuses the cannibal genre and the zombie film into an incoherent mess".

== See also ==
- List of zombie movies
