= Holocaust 2000 =

1977 film by Alberto De Martino

- Italian theatrical poster
- Directed by: Alberto De Martino
- Screenplay by: Sergio Donati; Alberto De Martino; Michael Robson
- Story by: Sergio Donati; Alberto De Martino
- Produced by: Edmondo Amati
- Starring: Kirk Douglas; Agostina Belli; Simon Ward; Anthony Quayle; Virginia McKenna; Alexander Knox; Ivo Garrani; Spiros Focas; Massimo Foschi; Adolfo Celi; Romolo Valli
- Cinematography: Erico Menczer
- Edited by: Vincenzo Tomassi
- Music by: Ennio Morricone
- Color process: Technicolor
- Production companies: Embassy Productions; Aston Film
- Distributed by: Titanus (Italy); The Rank Organisation (UK); American International Pictures (US)
- Release date: 1977
- Running time: 102 minutes
- Countries: Italy; United Kingdom
- Language: English

Holocaust 2000 (also released as The Chosen and Rain of Fire) is a 1977 horror film directed by Alberto De Martino, written by De Martino, Michael Robson, and Sergio Donati, and starring Kirk Douglas, Simon Ward, Agostina Belli, Anthony Quayle, Virginia McKenna, and Alexander Knox. The original musical score was composed by Ennio Morricone.

The British-Italian co-production was produced by Edmondo Amati for The Rank Organisation and Titanus, and is widely-considered a cash-in on the success of the similarly-themed The Omen, which was released a year earlier. It received mixed reviews, but has become a cult classic.

== Plot ==
Despite doomsday warnings from throngs of locals, wealthy industrialist Robert Caine makes the controversial decision to build a nuclear power plant near a sacred cave in the Middle East. However, before Caine can reap the benefits of his latest bid for global domination, he discovers that his son, Angel, is the Antichrist, who is planning to use his father's project to trigger the end of the world. As Caine digs deeper, a string of suspicious accidents occur that kill off prominent figures who criticized the project. He also notes similarities between the design of the plant and features of a biblically-prophesied Beast that will herald the apocalypse. During a dream, Caine envisions the plant rising from the sea, then sees its circle of towers take on the form of a multiheaded monster.

== Different endings ==
The film was released with two endings. The European general release version of the film features an open ending, with Kirk Douglas in exile with his newborn child, and his adult son now successfully developing the plant intended to cause Armageddon.

In the shortened version released in U.S. theaters, home video, and network television, a new ending was added where Douglas returns to the company and enters a board meeting, having explosives hidden on him. In the final scene, Angel's face is overlaid with an image of an explosion, showing that Robert has successfully thwarted the apocalypse. The U.S. DVD from Lionsgate retains the original darker ending and the Blu-ray from Scream Factory contains both the European and American versions of the film.

== Cast ==
- Kirk Douglas as Robert Caine
- Simon Ward as Angel Caine
- Agostina Belli as Sara Golan
- Anthony Quayle as Professor Griffith
- Virginia McKenna as Eva Caine
- Spiros Focás as Harbin
- Ivo Garrani as The Prime Minister
- Alexander Knox as Professor Ernst Meyer
- Adolfo Celi as Dr. Kerouac
- Romolo Valli as Monsignor Charrier
- Geoffrey Keen as Dr. Howard
- Massimo Foschi as Arab Assassin
- John Carlin as Robertson
- Peter Cellier as Sheckley
- Gerard Hely as Clarke
- Penelope Horner as Caine's Secretary
- Caroline Langrishe as Carla
- Denis Lawson as Stevens
- Tony Clarkin as Megaphone Man

== Reception ==
In a contemporary review, the Monthly Film Bulletin referred to Holocaust 2000 as "the wildest farrago yet to have come out of the demonology genre", finding that "the religious allegory adds little weight to the confusion of the plot".

Donald Guarisco, writing a retrospective review for AllMovie, described the film as a rip-off of The Omen which nevertheless "offers some creepy fun for fans of Euro-horror." Guarisco praised some unique plot elements, such as political and corporate intrigue, as well as references to fears of nuclear energy and civil unrest in the Middle East. He also noted that De Martino "gives the film a glossy touch during the non-horror moments but brings plenty of verve to the shocks: his best moment is a nightmare sequence in which Douglas hallucinates the nuclear plant he is working on rising from the sea and transforming into a multi-headed hydra."
