= Cannibal film =

Film genre

Cannibal films, alternatively known as the cannibal genre or the cannibal boom, are a subgenre of horror films made predominantly by Italian filmmakers during the 1970s and 1980s. This subgenre is a collection of graphically violent movies that usually depict cannibalism by primitive, Stone Age natives deep within the Asian or South American rainforests. While cannibalism is the uniting feature of these films, the general emphasis focuses on various forms of shocking, realistic and graphic violence, typically including torture, rape and genuine cruelty to animals. This subject matter was often used as the main advertising draw of cannibal films in combination with exaggerated or sensational claims regarding the films' reputations.

The genre evolved in the early 1970s from a similar subgenre known as mondo films, exploitation documentaries which claimed to present genuine taboo behaviors from around the world. Umberto Lenzi is often cited as originating the cannibal genre with his 1972 film Man from Deep River, while Antonio Climati's Natura contro from 1988 is similarly regarded to have brought the trend to a close. Ruggero Deodato's Cannibal Holocaust, released in 1980, is often considered to be the best-known film of the genre due to the significant controversy surrounding its release, and is one of the few films of the genre to garner mainstream attention. In recent years, the genre has experienced a cult following and revival, as new productions influenced by the original wave of films have been released.

Due to their graphic content, the films of this subgenre are often the center of controversy, and many have been censored or banned in countries around the world. The animal cruelty featured in many of the films is often the focal point of the controversy, and these scenes have been targeted by certain countries' film boards. Several cannibal films also appeared on the video nasty list released by the Director of Public Prosecutions in 1983 in the United Kingdom. Nonetheless, the genre has occasionally fallen under favorable or more positive critical interpretation, and certain cannibal films have been noted for containing themes of anti-imperialism and critiques or commentary on Third World oppression and exploitation.

== Characteristics ==
The plots of cannibal films usually involved Western characters entering the Amazon or South East Asian rainforests on an expedition, only to encounter hostile natives on the way to their destination. Other films that are sometimes associated with the genre, such as Cannibal Apocalypse and We're Going to Eat You, do not follow this plotline. The films are known for their lurid content, such as sex, nudity and various forms of graphic violence. Sexual assault, torture, and the on-screen depiction of cannibalism are also common, and these acts are performed by both the Westerners and the natives.

The films' advertising focused on the presentation of this content rather than any critical acclaim. This form of advertising was sometimes accompanied by claims regarding the film's notoriety. For instance, the posters for Cannibal Ferox claimed that the film was banned in 31 countries, while the British home video cover for Eaten Alive! similarly noted that the film was previously banned in the country.

== History ==
Films containing elements similar to cannibal films existed before the genre's inception. Rainforest adventure films were often found popular in cinema (such as with the Tarzan movies of the 1930s and 1940s starring Johnny Weissmuller). Some of these films even included primitive, and in some cases, alleged cannibal tribes, and could be seen as the prototype for the modern cannibal film. One movie that can almost be definitively linked as the predecessor to the cannibal genre is Cornel Wilde's 1965 film The Naked Prey, which involved a white man being chased by a tribe of natives because his safari group offended their chief.

Another influential film on this genre was the 1970 Richard Harris western A Man Called Horse which, although it involved non-cannibalistic Native Americans, was about a civilized white man being captured by, and forced to live with, a tribe of savages, during which time he comes to respect, and strives to join, his captors. The basic plot of Man from Deep River is an almost scene-for-scene swipe from that film, merely substituting rainforest cannibals for the Native Americans. This film, created to imitate the famous 1970 Richard Harris western, would wind up becoming the template for what would later become the Italian cannibal film genre.

The subgenre as it is known today is usually regarded to have started with Italian director Umberto Lenzi's 1972 film Man from Deep River. It was released in New York City as Sacrifice!, and was a 42nd Street hit. This film inspired several other similar films to be made during the late 1970s, a period identified by genre fans as the "cannibal boom". Included in these films are Ruggero Deodato's 1977 film Ultimo mondo cannibale (a.k.a. Last Cannibal World, a.k.a. Jungle Holocaust), Sergio Martino's 1978 film The Mountain of the Cannibal God and a few films by Joe D'Amato starring Laura Gemser. However, Deodato also claims to be the forefather of the subgenre, with his film Ultimo mondo cannibale. Lenzi said in an interview for Calum Waddell's documentary Eaten Alive! The Rise and Fall of the Italian Cannibal Film:

Well, Mr. Ruggero Deodato, my "dear friend", says that he invented this genre. He says that I copied him because he had done Last Cannibal World and then Cannibal Holocaust. However, it is actually down to me that he did those films. It was down to me because after I filmed Man from Deep River, which was called Mondo Cannibale in Germany and did very well, the producer then signed another contract with the German distributors. It gave them an 80% guarantee based on another cannibal film directed by Umberto Lenzi and starring Me Me Lai and Ivan Rassimov. The producer signed this contract and he was at my house for dinner expecting me to do another film like the one we had just done and telling me how he had sold it to the Germans. I said okay, fine, but as the film did so well, I want to be paid exactly double of what I was given before. He refused, saying it was too much and so on. I said okay, good luck to you. Plus I was already signed up with Dania Film to do Almost Human. So what the producer did, so as not to void the contract with the Germans, was to change directors, stating I was ill or something. But he kept Me Me Lai and Ivan Rassimov. But Rassimov had a smaller part now. Nevertheless, both of them remained as part of this contract. So it was down to me that he [Deodato] got to do Last Cannibal World. It was me that said no. So he did it instead. However, if I had accepted it, like the contract stated, maybe he would never have done a cannibal film.

In response, Deodato, being interviewed for the same film, stated:

I think the forefather of the cannibal genre was me. I had not seen Umberto Lenzi's movie Man from Deep River. So my film, Last Cannibal World, really originated, and was written to start this whole cannibal trend. I studied a lot of books on the subject and documented some of it from National Geographic magazine as well. I also looked closely at the ritualism of cannibalism and I don't believe Lenzi did that with his film. Maybe Lenzi did it after I made Last Cannibal World. You know, when he went on to do Cannibal Ferox [in 1981]. He didn't do it first, that's for sure. When I finally saw his film, it was more of a copy of A Man Called Horse.

A large number of cannibal films were made in 1980, making it the most successful year for the genre. In February 1980, Ruggero Deodato released Cannibal Holocaust, probably the best-known of all the cannibal films. Luigi Cozzi has said: "to me, the real beginning of the cannibal genre is Cannibal Holocaust. It was a legitimate success at the box office, but not in Italy as it was banned, blocked and withheld. They distributed it at a later date, but it was dead by then. However, it did astonishing business abroad." Its graphic and unrelenting violence and exploitation brought it significant attention. Despite this (or perhaps because of this), Cannibal Holocaust was an enormous success; it is sometimes claimed to have accumulated a $200,000,000 USD worldwide box-office gross, though this has not been verified and the true gross may never be known. Umberto Lenzi would also contribute to the genre in 1980 with Eaten Alive!, and again in 1981 with the notorious Cannibal Ferox, but by then, however, the genre was beginning to fade, and only a few other obscurities were made until Mondo film director Antonio Climati was considered to have put an end to the genre in 1988 with the film Natura contro, which was also released as an unofficial sequel to Cannibal Holocaust (it has an alternative title of Cannibal Holocaust II). Other similar films were made with a direct-to-video release afterward, most notably the films by horror director Bruno Mattei.

The genre is heavily indebted to mondo cinema, which similarly aimed to shock audiences with exotic customs and graphic violence. A common premise of the cannibal films is that mondo filmmakers (as in Cannibal Holocaust) or anthropologists (as in Cannibal Ferox) from a "civilized" country enter a jungle and run afoul of cannibalistic natives. Ironically, many have an anti-imperialist slant to them, as in the films, the "civilized" Westerners are the first to perpetrate extreme cruelty and violence upon the natives. The cannibals, in turn, reap revenge by inflicting the same form of barbarism on the Westerners. A few are set in modern urban centers with cannibalism practiced secretly, as in Emanuelle and the Last Cannibals and Zombie Holocaust (which was the first film to mix the cannibal genre with the then-popular "zombie film").

== Directors ==
Several directors of different nationalities have contributed to the genre, but most of them did not make more than one cannibal film each. The major directors to the genre are:

- Ruggero Deodato, with the films Ultimo mondo cannibale, Cannibal Holocaust and Cut and Run.
- Umberto Lenzi, with the films Man from Deep River, Eaten Alive!, and Cannibal Ferox.
- Jesús Franco, with the films Mondo Cannibale, Devil Hunter, and Diamonds of Kilimandjaro.
- Joe D'Amato, with the films Emanuelle and the Last Cannibals, Papaya, Love Goddess of the Cannibals and Orgasmo Nero.

== Actors ==
Like directors, few actors are cannibal genre regulars. The three actors who appeared in the most cannibal films were:

- Robert Kerman in Cannibal Holocaust, Eaten Alive!, and Cannibal Ferox.
- Ivan Rassimov in Man from Deep River, Ultimo mondo cannibale, and Eaten Alive!.
- Me Me Lai in Man from Deep River, Ultimo mondo cannibale, and Eaten Alive!.

Other popular cannibal genre actors include: Laura Gemser, an Indonesian model-turned-actress in Italy; Perry Pirkanen, who played Jack Anders in Cannibal Holocaust and an uncredited role in Cannibal Ferox; Carl Gabriel Yorke, who played Alan Yates in Cannibal Holocaust; Giovanni Lombardo Radice, a mainstream Italian actor whose stage name is John Morghen; and Luigina Rocchi, who played one of the natives who painted Ursula Andress' body in The Mountain of the Cannibal God and an undetermined role in Cannibal Holocaust.

== Films by year ==
Film	Director	Year	Also known as
Man from the Deep River	Umberto Lenzi	1972	Il paese del sesso selvaggio / The Country of Savage Sex; Deep River Savages; The Man From Deep River; Sacrifice!
Emanuelle and the Last Cannibals	Joe D'Amato	1977	Emanuelle e gli Ultimi Cannibali; Trap Them and Kill Them
Ultimo mondo cannibale	Ruggero Deodato	1977	Last Cannibal World; Jungle Holocaust
Papaya, Love Goddess of the Cannibals	Joe D'Amato	1978	Papaya dei Caraibi
Slave of the Cannibal God	Sergio Martino	1978	La montagna del dio cannibale; Slave of the Cannibal God; Prisoner of the Cannibal God
Antropophagus	Joe D'Amato	1980	Anthropophagus: The Beast; The Savage Island; The Grim Reaper
Cannibal Holocaust	Ruggero Deodato	1980	Holocausto Canibal
Devil Hunter	Jesus Franco	1980	Il cacciatore di uomini / The Man Hunter; Mandingo Manhunter
Eaten Alive!	Umberto Lenzi	1980	Mangiati vivi!
Mondo Cannibale	Jesus Franco	1980	Cannibal World; The Cannibals; Cannibals; White Cannibal Queen; Die Blonde Gottin / The Blonde Goddess; A Woman for the Cannibals; Barbarian Goddess
We're Going to Eat You	Tsui Hark	1980	Diyu wu Men
Zombie Holocaust	Marino Girolami	1980	Zombi Holocaust; Zombie 3; Zombi 3; Queen of the Cannibals; Doctor Butcher, M.D. (Medical Deviate)
Cannibal Ferox	Umberto Lenzi	1981	Make Them Die Slowly; Woman from Deep River
Cannibal Terror	Alain Deruelle	1981	Terreur Caníbal (contains stock footage from Jesus Franco's Mondo Cannibale)
Cut and Run	Ruggero Deodato	1985	Inferno in diretta / Hell...Live!; Amazonia
Massacre in Dinosaur Valley	Michele Massimo Tarantini	1985	Nudo e Selvaggio / Naked and Savage; Cannibal Ferox 2
White Slave	Mario Gariazzo	1985	Schiave Bianche: Violenza in Amazzonia / White Slave: Violence in Amazonia; Amazonia: The Catherine Miles Story; Cannibal Holocaust 2: The Catherine Miles Story
Natura contro	Antonio Climati	1988	Against Nature; The Green Inferno; Cannibal Holocaust II

== Censorship ==
Because of the content, the cannibal genre is one of the most controversial genres of film. Many of the films were once banned in the U.K. and Australia and most were forced to be edited before public display. Several are still banned in countries all around the world. Only three films of the genre (Schiave Bianche: Violenza in Amazzonia, Ultimo mondo cannibale and Zombie Holocaust) have been rated R by the MPAA for the edited version (the R rating for Zombie Holocaust has since been surrendered, and the film is now unrated in the United States).

The most controversial aspects of the genre include the real killing of animals and graphic scenes of rape and other sexual violence being present in many cannibal films.

== Cannibal Holocaust ==
The most controversial and most infamous movie of the genre was Cannibal Holocaust. Ten days after the premiere in Milan, the film was seized by Italian authorities and director Ruggero Deodato was arrested on the belief that his film was a real snuff film. Facing life in prison, Deodato was able to bring all the actors onto a television show and demonstrated in court how some of the special effects were accomplished. The charges were dropped, but because of the still extremely explicit content, the courts still banned the film because of the real cruelty towards animals. Deodato was ultimately held on charges of obscenity and animal violence. Four years later, in 1984, Deodato was able to overturn the courts' rulings and the film was unbanned. Ironically, that same year, the United Kingdom, Norway, Finland, and Australia banned Cannibal Holocaust; all four have since repealed the ban, though the U.K. version has several minutes of edits. It is sometimes claimed that Cannibal Holocaust is still banned in over 50 countries worldwide, though this can only be verified for a handful of nations. In 2006, Cannibal Holocaust made Entertainment Weekly's Top 25 Most Controversial Movies of All-Time list, landing at number 20.

== Video nasty ==
Several of the films landed on the U.K.'s infamous video nasty list. They are:

- Man from Deep River (1972)
- The Mountain of the Cannibal God (1978)
- Cannibal Holocaust (1980)
- Devil Hunter (1980)
- Cannibal Ferox (1981)
- Cannibal Terror (1981)

== See also ==
- Cannibalism in literature
- Cannibalism in popular culture
- Extreme cinema
- Found footage
- Splat Pack
