= Esa mujer (film) =

- Film poster
- Directed by: Mario Camus
- Written by: Antonio Gala, Fernando Vizcaíno Casas
- Produced by: Marciano de la Fuente
- Starring: Sara Montiel and Ivan Rassimov
- Cinematography: Christian Matras
- Edited by: José Luis Matesanz
- Music by: Gregorio García Segura
- Distributed by: Suevia Films
- Release date: 1969
- Running time: 99 minutes
- Country: Spain
- Language: Spanish

Esa mujer (That Woman) is a 1969 Spanish musical legal drama film directed by Mario Camus and starring Sara Montiel and Ivan Rassimov. It is described as a "court-room melodrama with a singing nun".

== Plot ==
The film is set in the 19th century and follows the tragedy of singer Soledad Romero, who fights for her innocence in a murder case.

== Cast ==
- Sara Montiel as Soledad Romero Fuentes
- Ivan Rassimov as Carlos Alcántara
- Cándida Losada as Madre Lucía
- Marcela Yurfa as Madre San Pablo
- Hugo Blanco as Javier
- José Marco Davó as Juan José
- Jesús Aristu as Luis
- Ricardo Díaz as Ramón
- Patricia Nigel as Eugenia Guzmán
- Marta Reves as Madre Clara
- Matilde Muñoz Sampedro as Eduarda Rodríguez
- Fernando as lawyer
- William Layton as the judge
- Vicente Vega as prosecutor
- Carlos Otero as prosecutor
- Francisco Merino as police inspector
- José Orjas as Herrera

== Production and reception ==
The film was commissioned by Cesáreo González for Suevia Films, and was a box office success in Spain with 1,374,056 spectators in cinemas.
