= Ivan Rassimov =

Italian actor (1938–2003)

- Rassimov in the film Your Vice Is a Locked Room and Only I Have the Key (1972)
- Born: Ivan Đerasimović; 7 May 1938; Trieste, Kingdom of Italy
- Died: 14 March 2003 (aged 64); Rome, Italy
- Other names: Sean Todd; Ivan Rassimovich
- Education: University of Trieste
- Occupation: Actor
- Years active: 1964–1987

Ivan Đerasimović (7 May 1938 – 14 March 2003), known professionally as Ivan Rassimov, was an Italian actor of Serbian descent. He was known for his roles in many genre films of the 1960s and 70s, often playing villains.

== Early life ==
Rassimov was born Ivan Đerasimović (Serbian Cyrillic: Иван Ђерасимовић) to Serbian parents Velimir and Vera Đerasimović (née Petrijević) in Trieste in 1938. His parents had moved to Italy from Yugoslavia the year of his birth.

He was educated at the Slovenian scientific lyceum (Gimnazija s slovenskim učnim jezikom) in Trieste, and served in Italian Army. After his discharge, he enrolled in the University of Trieste to study acting. He then moved to Rome, and found work as a model in photo comics.

== Career ==
After working as an extra, Rassimov had his first significant role in Mario Bava's Planet of the Vampires (1965), followed by a supporting role in Damiano Damiani's La strega in amore (1966). From 1967 to 1968, he was a leading man in a string of Spaghetti Westerns, credited as 'Sean Todd'. In 1970, he played Sandokan in The Tigers of Mompracem.

Despite his early stint playing heroes, Rassimov would mostly be cast in villainous roles, often in horror and giallo films. He worked with directors like Sergio Martino (The Strange Vice of Mrs. Wardh, All the Colors of the Dark, and Your Vice Is a Locked Room and Only I Have the Key), Umberto Lenzi, Ruggero Deodato, and Joe D'Amato. He starred in two of Lenzi's cannibal films, Man from the Deep River (1972) and Eaten Alive! (1980), playing the hero in the former and the antagonist in the latter. In 1977, he appeared in Mario Bava's last film Shock.

Rassimov's career slowed during the 1980s, and he would retire outright at the end of the decade.

== Personal life ==
Rassimov was the elder brother of actress Rada Rassimov (b. 1941). He was married to Greek makeup artist Efi Melessi, and had a daughter. He was previously in a relationship with Spanish actress Sara Montiel, whom he co-starred with in Esa mujer.

After retiring from acting, Rassimov worked for a publishing firm.

=== Death ===
Rassimov died of illness in Rome on 14 March 2003, at the age of 64. He was buried at Cimitero Flaminio.

== Filmography ==
Year	Title	Role	Director	Notes
1964	Super rapina a Milano		Adriano Celentano	As 'Ivan Rassimovich'
1965	Planet of the Vampires	Carter	Mario Bava	
1966	Almost a Man		Vittorio De Seta	
1966	La strega in amore	Librarian	Damiano Damiani	
1966	The Bible: In the Beginning	Dignitary of Babylon	John Huston	Uncredited
1967	Non aspettare Django, spara	Django Foster	Edoardo Mulargia	As 'Sean Todd'
1967	Soledad		Mario Camus	
1967	Il ragazzo che sapeva amare		Enzo Dell'Aquila	
1967	Cjamango	Cjamango	Edoardo Mulargia	As 'Sean Todd'
1968	Se vuoi vivere... spara	Django / Johnny Dall	Sergio Garrone	As 'Sean Todd'
1969	The Seven Red Berets	Alain Carrès	Mario Siciliano	
1969	Esa mujer	Carlos Alcántara	Mario Camus	
1969	Taste of Vengeance	Daniel	Mario Siciliano	As 'Sean Todd'
1970	Overrun!	Lt. Alan Crossland	Mario Siciliano	
1970	The Tigers of Mompracem	Sandokan	Mario Sequi	
1971	The Strange Vice of Mrs. Wardh	Jean	Sergio Martino	
1971	Vengeance Is a Dish Served Cold	Perkins	Pasquale Squitieri	
1971	Cross Current	Burt	Tonino Ricci	
1972	All the Colors of the Dark	Mark Cogan	Sergio Martino	
1972	The Man from the Deep River	John Bradley	Umberto Lenzi	
1972	Your Vice Is a Locked Room and Only I Have the Key	Walter	Sergio Martino	
1972	Spirits of Death	Massimo	Romano Scavolini	
1973	Super Bitch	Insp. Cliff	Massimo Dallamano	
1974	Spasmo	Fritz Bauman	Umberto Lenzi	
1974	The Eerie Midnight Horror Show	Satan	Mario Gariazzo	
1974	Salvo D'Acquisto	German Sergeant	Romolo Guerrieri	
1975	Il lupo dei mari	Death Larsen	Giuseppe Vari	
1976	The Tough Ones	Antonio 'Tony' Parenzo	Umberto Lenzi	
1976	Inhibition	Peter Smart	Paolo Poeti	
1976	Colt 38 Special Squad	Marsigliese (it. version) / Black Angel (eng. version)	Massimo Dallamano	
1976	Emanuelle in Bangkok	Prince Sanit	Joe D'Amato	
1977	Last Cannibal World	Rolf	Ruggero Deodato	
1977	Shock	Dr. Aldo Spidini	Mario Bava	
1977	Emanuelle Around the World	Dr. Malcolm Robertson	Joe D'Amato	
1978	Spy Kill	The Silent	Romolo Guerrieri	
1979	The Humanoid	Lord Graal	Aldo Lado	
1980	Eaten Alive!	Jonas Melvyn	Umberto Lenzi	
1981	I figli... so' pezzi 'e core	Lorenzo Berisio	Alfonso Brescia	
1981	Odd Squad	Pvt. Russ Baxter	Enzo Barboni	
1983	The Atlantis Interceptors	Bill Cook	Ruggero Deodato	
1984	Buio nella valle		Giuseppe Fina	TV Mini-Series
1984	Torna		Stelvio Massi	
1985	I cinque del Condor	Marius	Umberto Lenzi	
1986	Body Count	Deputy Sheriff Ted	Ruggero Deodato	
1989	Appuntamento a Trieste		Bruno Mattei	3 episodes (final appearance)
