= Me Me Lai =

Burmese-British actress (born 1951)

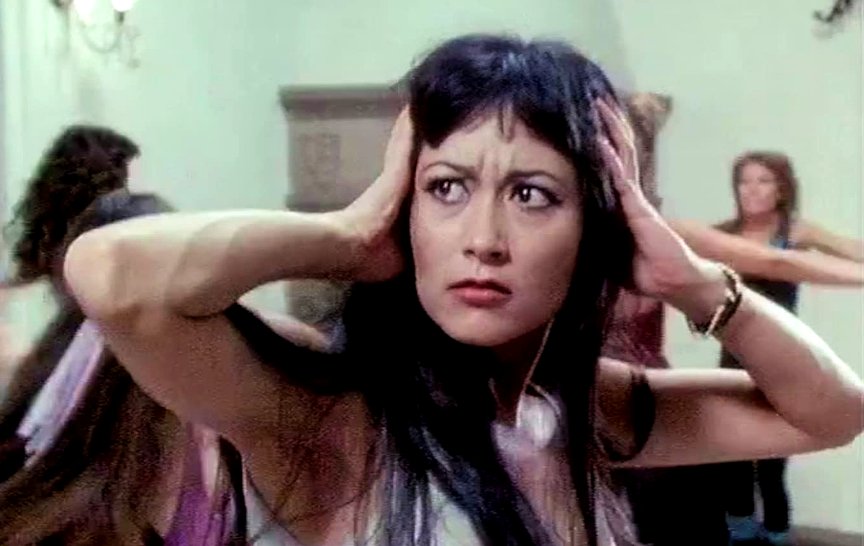
Me Me Lai in The Optimist (1983)

Me Me Lai (born 3 November 1951), sometimes billed as Me Me Lay or Meme Lay, is a Burmese-British actress and television host who worked mainly in British and Italian films, most notably in the horror genre.

== Life ==
She was born on the night of 3 November 1951 in Burma to a Burmese mother and an English father. She moved to England in her teens, where she soon started her acting career, at first in television series like Paul Temple and Jason King. Soon, she made the transition to acting in movies, starting with the 1971 Mike Raven horror movie Crucible of Terror, soon followed by the 1972 sex comedy Au Pair Girls directed by Val Guest.

Lai came into her own during the era of Italian cannibal films, playing lead roles in two genre-defining movies: Man from Deep River (1972) by Umberto Lenzi, and Last Cannibal World (1977) by Ruggero Deodato. Additionally, she also had a part in Eaten Alive! (1980), again by Lenzi, in which one of her scenes from Last Cannibal World was re-used. Outside the cannibal genre, she had a brief role as a Chinese brothel girl in Blake Edwards's 1978 comedy Revenge of the Pink Panther.

Me Me Lai also was co-hostess of British game shows The Golden Shot and Sale of the Century, and appeared on the 1970s Yorkshire Television programme Origami, with Robert Harbin.

Her last movie was Lars von Trier's The Element of Crime in 1984. She later joined the Essex police force.

== Filmography ==
- She'll Follow You Anywhere (1971) as bride
- Crucible of Terror (1971) as Chi-San
- Au Pair Girls (1972) as Nan Lee
- The Man from Deep River (1972) as Marayå
- Last Cannibal World (1977) as Pulan
- Revenge of the Pink Panther (1978) as Chinese lady of easy virtue
- Licensed to Love and Kill (1979) as female Madam Wang
- Eaten Alive! (1980) as Mowara
- The Element of Crime (1984) as Kim

=== Television appearances ===
- Paul Temple (1970) as masseuse
- Hine (1971) as Miss Mini
- Spearhead (1981) as Mimi
- The Optimist (1983) as karate girl
