= Slave of the Cannibal God =

1978 film by Sergio Martino

- Italian theatrical release poster by Enzo Sciotti
- Directed by: Sergio Martino
- Written by: Cesare Frugoni; Sergio Martino
- Produced by: Luciano Martino
- Starring: Ursula Andress; Stacy Keach; Claudio Cassinelli; Antonio Marsina
- Cinematography: Giancarlo Ferrando
- Edited by: Eugenio Alabiso
- Music by: Guido & Maurizio De Angelis
- Production companies: Dania Film; Medusa Distribuzione
- Distributed by: Medusa Distribuzione
- Release dates: 25 May 1978 (West Germany); 10 August 1978 (Italy); 13 April 1979 (United States)
- Running time: 99 minutes
- Country: Italy
- Language: English

Slave of the Cannibal God (Italian: La montagna del dio cannibale, lit. 'The Mountain of the Cannibal God', also released as released in the U.K. under the title Prisoner of the Cannibal God) is a 1978 Italian cannibal horror film directed and co-written by Sergio Martino and starring Ursula Andress, Stacy Keach, and Claudio Cassinelli. It follows a woman searching for her lost husband in the jungles of New Guinea.

== Plot ==
Susan Stevenson is trying to find her missing anthropologist husband, Henry, in the jungles of New Guinea. She and her brother Arthur enlist the services of Professor Edward Foster, who thinks her husband might have headed for the mountain Ra Ra Me, which is located just off the coast on the island of Roka.

The locals believe the mountain is cursed, and the authorities will not allow expeditions there, so the searchers enter the jungle surreptitiously to begin the search. They eventually make it to the island, and after a few run-ins with some unfriendly anacondas, alligators, and tarantulas, they meet another jungle explorer named Manolo, who has been staying at a nearby mission camp, and agrees to join them in their expedition.

Matters become complicated when it becomes evident that all of them have their own private reasons for coming to the island, none of which include finding Susan's missing husband. Susan and Arthur are secretly looking for uranium deposits. Foster reveals that he had been on the island a few years previously, was taken captive by a tribe of primitive cannibals, and has only returned to wipe them out if they still exist. Foster later dies while climbing up a waterfall.

Upon arriving at the mountain, Arthur is killed, and Manolo and Susan are captured by the cannibals and taken to their cave. There, they find the natives worshiping the mummified remains of Susan's husband. The natives can hear Henry's Geiger counter ticking and believe his heart is still beating. They worship Henry as their Cannibal God and find a photo of him and Susan together. As a result, Susan is spared, and the cannibals feast on other human and reptile flesh. She is stripped naked, bound at the wrists to a pole, and has her entire body smeared with an orange cream by two native girls. At first, it seems this is to be a session of honey torture, but Susan is turned into a Cannibal Goddess after tasting and eating Arthur's cooked remains. Manolo is tied up and tortured while the others are consumed. One of the cannibals attempts to rape Susan while no one is looking, but is caught and emasculated before being killed as punishment. Manolo and Susan eventually escape after enduring their ordeals.

== Cast ==
- Ursula Andress as Susan Stevenson
- Stacy Keach as Edward Foster
- Claudio Cassinelli as Manolo
- Antonio Marsina as Arthur Weisser
- Franco Fantasia as Father Moses
- Lanfranco Spinola as Consul Burns
- Carlo Longhi as Phil
- Akushula Selayah as Sura
- Dudley Wanaguru as Government officer
- Tom Felleghy as Henry Stevenson (uncredited)

== Production ==
The film was shot mostly on-location in Sri Lanka. The movie is also known for a few shots of unstimulated animal violence, such as a moment featuring a monkey being eaten by a snake.

== Release ==
Slave of the Cannibal God was released in Italy on August 10, 1978. The film was not seen in the U.S. until 1979 from New Line Cinema. It was released as Prisoner of the Cannibal God in the UK (where it was banned for a time as a “video nasty”), with a poster designed by Sam Peffer.

=== Home media ===
The film was released on Ultra HD Blu-ray by Severin Films on 24 June 2025.

== Critical reception ==
The Monthly Film Bulletin called it a "spiced up dish of left overs" plot-wise, but said the location filming gave it "authenticity".

Allmovie gave the film a negative review, writing, "a graphic and unpleasant film, with all the noxious trademarks intact: gratuitous violence, real-life atrocities committed against live animals and an uncomfortably imperialist attitude towards underprivileged peoples."

Andrew Smith from Popcorn Pictures awarded the film a score of 4/10, writing, "Mountain of the Cannibal God merely goes through the usual Italian cannibal exploitation film motions, only this time with the bonus of a famous cast. More professionally made but lacking the raw, nihilistic punch of some of its counterparts, it's neither the best of this sub-genre, nor the worst either."

Anya Stanley from Daily Grindhouse called the film "problematic", citing the film's depictions of animal cruelty and "imperialist attitudes towards indigenous populations". However, Stanley commended the film's occasionally beautiful cinematography, and called it "one of the more cohesive cannibal films, that utilizes the flesh feast as more of a flourish than a crutch."

The film is often compared to H. Rider Haggard's novel The People of the Mist.
