= Man from the Deep River =

1972 Italian cannibal exploitation film directed by Umberto Lenzi

Il paese del sesso selvaggio
- Theatrical release poster
- Directed by: Umberto Lenzi
- Written by: Francesco Barilli; Massimo D'Avak
- Produced by: Ovidio G. Assonitis; Stenio Fiorentini; Giorgio Carlo Rossi; Marcello Soffiantini
- Starring: Ivan Rassimov; Me Me Lai; Pratitsak Singhara; Sullalewan Suxantat; Ong Ard
- Cinematography: Riccardo Pallottini
- Edited by: Eugenio Alabiso
- Music by: Daniele Patucchi
- Distributed by: Media Blasters (United States)
- Release dates: 8 August 1972 (Italy); 23 May 1973 (United States)
- Running time: 93 minutes
- Languages: Italian; Burmese

Il paese del sesso selvaggio (English: The Country of Savage Sex), also known as Man From Deep River, Deep River Savages and Sacrifice!, is a 1972 Italian cannibal exploitation film directed by Umberto Lenzi and starring Ivan Rassimov, Me Me Lai and Pratitsak Singhara. It is perhaps best known for starting the "cannibal boom" of Italian exploitation cinema during the late 1970s and early 1980s.

It is theorized that Lenzi was trying to imitate the content of notorious Mondo cinema, which had gained considerable popularity in grindhouse theaters since Gualtiero Jacopetti and Paolo Cavara had made Mondo Cane in 1962, even though this film is fictional. Like Man from Deep River, Mondo films often focus on exotic customs and locations, graphic violence, and animal cruelty.

The film and its title were mainly inspired by A Man Called Horse, which also featured a white man who is incorporated into a tribe that originally held him captive.

== Plot ==
British photographer John Bradley is assigned to photograph wildlife in the Thai rainforest. John attends a boxing match in Bangkok with a woman who becomes frustrated and walks out on him. An unidentified man then follows John to a bar and confronts him with a knife, but John turns the weapon against the man, kills him, and flees.

The next day, John rents a canoe and hires a guide to take him down the river into the rainforest. The guide, Tuan, expresses concern about traveling so far, but John agrees to return after one more day.

John falls asleep and awakens to find Tuan dead. A native tribe captures John in a net and carries him to their village, where the chief, Luhanà, is told they have captured a large fish-man. John is then hanged in the net from a pole and witnesses the execution of two war criminals by the tribe, which is at war with another, more primitive tribe of cannibals, the Kuru. John labels his captor tribe as murderers.

Hanging in the net for hours, John attracts the attention of Marayå, the chief's daughter, who convinces her father that John is not a fish-man, just a man. Luhanà agrees to release John as Marayå's slave and locks him in a shack, where Marayå's governess, Taima, an English-speaking missionary child, tells him that he will be released as Marayå will soon be married to Karen. Luhanà interrupts and unties John because it is the day of the Feast of the Sun. When a helicopter flies overhead, and John attempts to be rescued, he is subdued by warriors who nearly kill him, but Marayå intervenes. John then plans an escape, and Taima agrees to help.

One month later, a building accident kills a young laborer. As John watches the funeral ceremonies and is shocked by the natives' rituals, Taima tells him it is now his time to escape. He does, but Karen and a group of warriors corner him, and he kills Karen. Afterward, the tribe incorporates John as one of them, putting him through rituals and torture until he is released and accepted as a warrior. He uses his knowledge of modern technology and medicine to help the tribe, but then becomes an enemy of the tribe's witch doctor. John and Marayå become fond of each other and are soon married. The two consummate, resulting in her eventual pregnancy, but a black butterfly flies over the two lovers during conception, portending doom.

Six months after his capture, John finally accepts his new life with Marayå. As John and other village warriors stave off an attack party of Kuru cannibals who are consuming a young girl, John participates in activities he had once condemned. When he returns, Marayå has fallen ill from the pregnancy and is blind, so he decides to take her back to civilization for modern medical treatment. Taima helps them escape, but she is caught and punished, while John and Marayå are forced to return.

Marayå goes into labor, and John rejects the witch doctor's help. The Kuru return to attack and set the village on fire before John and the other warriors can react. John takes Marayå to safety until the cannibals withdraw, and when he points out a black butterfly overhead, Marayå reveals that it signifies death. Marayå dies following childbirth, and John wanders through the jungle, reminiscing about her. Another helicopter flies overhead, and after contemplation, John takes cover with the rest of his tribe.

== Cast ==
- Ivan Rassimov as John Bradley
- Me Me Lai as Marayå
- Pratitsak Singhara as Taima
- Sullalewan Suxantat as Karen
- Ong Ard as Lahunà
- Prapas Chindang as Chuan
- Pipop Pupinyo as Mihuan
- Tuan Tevan as Tuan
- Chit as Cannibal
- Choi as Cannibal
- Song Suanhad as Witch Doctor
- Pairach Thaipradt as Thai
- Luciano Martino as Extra in bar (uncredited)

== Legacy ==
Though the "cannibal boom" of the 1970s and 1980s did not start until Ruggero Deodato released his film Ultimo mondo cannibale in 1977, Man from Deep River is seen as either the inspiration or the beginning of the cannibal genre, as the combination of the rain forest setting and onscreen cannibalism was not seen until its release However, director Umberto Lenzi said that cannibalism was not intended to be the film's central theme.

When released in America, it would prove successful on Times Square's 42nd Street under the title of Sacrifice!, offering the opportunity for similar films to enjoy that same success (which ultimately proved to be the case). Lenzi was even given the chance to direct Ultimo mondo cannibale, but the producers chose Ruggero Deodato when they refused to match Lenzi's price. Lenzi would, however, make a follow-up in 1980 with his film Eaten Alive!—which even featured the grindhouse theaters of 42nd Street that had made Man from Deep River famous—and his most famous film, Cannibal Ferox (1981).

=== Censorship ===
Other than being the first cannibal film, Man from Deep River is also notorious for several scenes of extreme violence and gore, which is standard for the genre. Though several scenes of torture and cruelty are present, its inclusion of several on-screen slayings of animals has tended to land the film in hot water with censors all over the world.

==== Status as a video nasty ====
A large amount of the film's notoriety comes from its inclusion in the UK's list of video nasties, films that the Department of Public Prosecutions (DPP) deemed obscene. Though it was rejected for cinema release and certification by the BBFC in 1975, it was still able to make it to a video release under the title Deep River Savages. When the DPP compiled the "video nasties" in 1983, Deep River Savages made its way onto the list. In 1984, the Video Recordings Act was instated by the British Government, and Deep River Savages was banned from the UK in its entirety (largely due to the real animal killings). In 2003, Deep River Savages was again brought before the BBFC; it was passed with a certificate of 18 after being edited by nearly four minutes to remove all animal cruelty present, and was again subject to three minutes of similar edits when resubmitted in 2016. Despite the controversy surrounding the film's UK release, Man from Deep River was passed with a simple R rating by the MPAA in the United States.

== See also ==
- Ultimo mondo cannibale
- Cannibal Holocaust
- Eaten Alive!
- Cut and Run
- Mondo Cannibale
