= Classical Love =

Classical Love (simplified Chinese: 古典爱情; traditional Chinese: 古典愛情; pinyin: Gudian aiqing) is a short story by Chinese writer Yu Hua that is an unconventional parody of the classic scholar and beautiful maiden novel style.
