= Ultimo mondo cannibale =

Last Cannibal World
- Spanish theatrical release poster
- Directed by: Ruggero Deodato
- Screenplay by: Tito Capri; Gianfranco Clerici; Renzo Genta
- Story by: Renzo Genta; Giorgio Carlo Rossi
- Produced by: Giorgio Carlo Rossi
- Starring: Massimo Foschi; Me Me Lai; Ivan Rassimov
- Cinematography: Marcello Masciocchi
- Edited by: Daniele Alabiso
- Music by: Ubaldo Continiello
- Production company: Erre Cinematografica
- Distributed by: Interfilm
- Release date: 8 February 1977
- Running time: 92 minutes
- Country: Italy
- Languages: Italian; English

Ultimo mondo cannibale (English: Last Cannibal World; also known as Cannibal, Jungle Holocaust and The Last Survivor) is a 1977 Italian cannibal exploitation film directed by Ruggero Deodato and written by Tito Carpi, Gianfranco Clerici and Renzo Genta. Starring Massimo Foschi, Me Me Lai and Ivan Rassimov, the plot follows a man trying to escape from a jungle island inhabited by a cannibal tribe.

It is the precursor to Deodato's notorious Cannibal Holocaust (1980) and was originally slated to be directed by Umberto Lenzi as a follow-up to his prototypical 1972 cannibal film Man from Deep River. While not prosecuted for obscenity, the film was seized and confiscated in the UK under Section 3 of the Obscene Publications Act 1959 during the video nasty panic.

== Plot ==
Oil prospectors Rolf and Robert travel to an outpost in a jungle on the island of Mindanao. A rough landing damages the Cessna charter plane. Robert and Rolf find the abandoned remains of the original prospecting camp. They then find a rotting corpse and determine the prospectors were massacred by natives. Later, a member of the team, Swan, goes missing. The prospectors and their pilot Charlie go into the jungle, and the pilot is killed by a trap. Robert and Rolf then see Swan's remains being eaten by cannibals. After building a raft to float down the river to return to the airfield, the men are separated when the raft is destroyed after traversing rapids. Robert, lost in the jungle, eats poisonous mushrooms, which causes him to vomit and pass out. He awakens to find himself being poked and prodded by the cannibals.

Robert is then taken to a cave inhabited by the native tribe. He is tied to a rock and stripped down to his underwear by the natives. A native woman, Pulan, tears his underwear off, exposing his genitalia. The natives grope Robert before attaching him to a pulley and dropping him from the top of the cave until he passes out.

Robert spends the next several days imprisoned in a small cave, abused by the natives and fed rotting offal. When asking Pulan for a bowl of water, she instead forcibly masturbates him. He continues to observe the natives living their daily life, which includes eviscerating, cooking, and eating a crocodile. Robert realizes he is being kept as bait for crocodile hunting, spurring him to escape and kidnap Pulan. The two wander through the jungle until Pulan runs away. When Robert catches up to Pulan, he beats and rapes her.

The two then find Rolf, who has been living in a cave and has a gangrenous wound on his leg. The three of them wander through the jungle until they reach the landing field. The cannibals chase them and kill, cook, and consume Pulan. After Rolf is hit in the chest with a spear, Robert fights and kills one of the cannibals with a spear laced with cobra venom. Robert then eats the native's liver to frighten the other cannibals. Robert and Rolf then manage to make it to their plane and fly off; it is implied Rolf dies from his chest injury soon after takeoff, collapsing on the seat of the airplane.

The postscript states Robert Harper quit his job as an oil prospector, got married, and moved to a "small farm" in Mexico.

== Cast ==
- Massimo Foschi as Robert Harper
- Me Me Lai as Pulan
- Ivan Rassimov as Rolf
- Sheik Razak Shikur as Charlie
- Judy Rosly as Swan

== Release ==
=== Controversy ===
The film was censored upon its initial theatrical release in the United Kingdom, with nearly four minutes of cuts, mainly directed to scenes of animal cruelty. In 2003, the film was allowed to release on DVD, but nearly three minutes of cuts were still required.

In Australia, the film was initially banned before being released on VHS with heavy cuts to remove "indecent violence."

== Reception ==
Mike Long from DVD Talk gave the film two out of five stars, writing, "The problem with Jungle Holocaust is that beyond its shock value, it really doesn't offer anything else to the viewer." In his review, Long criticized the film for its lack of story, character development, and unconvincing gore effects. On his website Fantastic Movie Musings and Ramblings Dave Sindelar wrote, "Of the Italian cannibal movies I’ve seen to this point, this is easily the most savage and the nastiest; it is also better made than the others I’ve seen. However, since the whole genre is rather offensive, one almost wishes it was poorly made so one could discard it; as it is, like it or not, the movie does have a certain power to it."
