= List of giallo films =

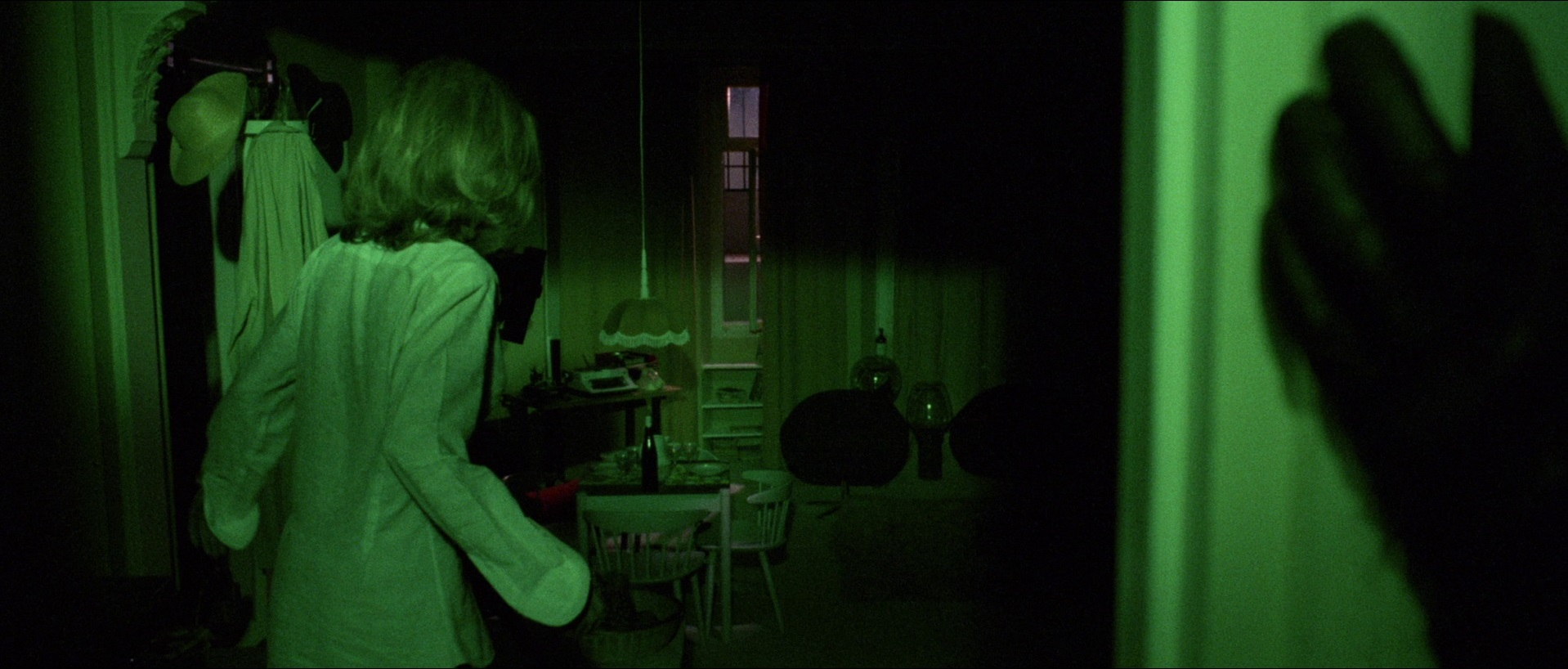
Anita Strindberg in The Case of the Scorpion's Tail (1971), showing some trademarks of the giallo genre: a black-gloved killer's POV, vivid colour and a vulnerable young woman

This is a list of giallo films, a genre of Italian-produced murder mystery film blending the atmosphere and suspense of the thriller genre with elements of horror (such as slasher violence) and eroticism.

Gialli often feature a number of distinctive plot elements, such as a mysterious killer (often dressed in a disguise and wearing black gloves) whose identity is revealed in the climax.

The genre developed in the mid-to-late 1960s, peaked in popularity during the 1970s, and subsequently declined in commercial mainstream filmmaking over the next few decades, though examples continue to be produced. It was a predecessor to, and had significant influence on, the later slasher film genre.

== Films by decade ==
=== 1960s ===
- The Girl Who Knew Too Much (Mario Bava, 1963; Italian: La ragazza che sapeva troppo) a.k.a. Evil Eye
- Blood and Black Lace (Mario Bava, 1964; Italian: Sei donne per l'assassino / Six Women for the Murderer) a.k.a. Fashion House of Death
- Death on the Fourposter (Jean Josipovici and Ambrogio Molteni, 1964; Italian: Delitto allo Specchio / Crime in the Mirror) a.k.a. Sexy Party
- 24 ore di terrore (Gastone Grandi, 1964; translation: 24 Hours of Terror)
- The Monster of London City (Edwin Zbonek, 1964) West German krimi film that predated the Italian giallo format
- A Game of Crime (Romano Ferrera, 1964; Italian: Crimine a due / Crime for Two)
- The Embalmer (Dino Tavella, 1965; Italian: Il mostro di Venezia / The Monster of Venice)
- Assassination in Rome (Silvio Amadio, 1965; Italian: Il segreto del vestito rosso / The Secret of the Red Dress)
- Libido (Ernesto Gastaldi, 1965)
- The Possessed (Luigi Bazzoni and Franco Rossellini, 1965; Italian: La donna del lago / The Lady of the Lake) a.k.a. Love, Hate and Dishonor
- Night of Violence (Roberto Mauri, 1965; Italian: Le notti della violenza / Nights of Violence) a.k.a. Call Girls 66
- The Third Eye (Mino Guerrini, 1966; Italian: Il terzo occhio)
- A... For Assassin (Angelo Dorigo, 1966; Italian: A... come Assassino)
- The Murder Clinic (Elio Scardamaglia, 1966; Italian: La lama nel corpo / The Knife in the Body) a.k.a. Nights of Terror, a.k.a. Revenge of the Living Dead
- Date for a Murder (Mino Guerrini, 1966; Italian: Omicidio per appuntamento/ Murder by Appointment)
- The Murderer with the Silk Scarf (Adrian Hoven, 1966; German: Der Mörder mit dem Seidenschal) starring Helga Line
- Killer Without a Face (Angelo Dorigo, 1967; Italian: Assassino senza volto) starring Janine Reynaud
- Deadly Sweet (Tinto Brass, 1967; Italian: Col cuore in gola/ With Heart in Mouth) a.k.a. I Am What I Am
- The Sweet Body of Deborah (Romolo Guerrieri, 1968; Italian: Il dolce corpo di Deborah)
- Death Laid an Egg (Giulio Questi, 1968; Italian: La morte ha fatto l'uovo) a.k.a. Plucked, a.k.a. A Curious Way to Love
- The Young, the Evil and the Savage (Antonio Margheriti, 1968; Italian: Nude... si muore/ Naked... You Die!) a.k.a. The Schoolgirl Killer
- Deadly Inheritance (Vittorio Sindoni, 1968; Italian: L'assassino ha le mani pulite / The Killer has Clean Hands)
- Run, Psycho, Run (Brunello Rondi, 1968; Italian: Più tardi Claire, più tardi...) starring Janine Renaud
- A Black Veil for Lisa (Massimo Dallamano, 1968; Italian: La morte non ha sesso / Death Has No Sex)
- Yellow - Le cugine (Gianfranco Baldanello, 1969)
- The Seducers (Ottavio Alessi, 1969; Italian: Top Sensation)
- Interrabang (Giuliano Biagetti, 1969)
- A Complicated Girl (Damiano Damiani, 1969; Italian: Una ragazza piuttosto complicata/ A Rather Complicated Girl) starring Florinda Bolkan
- So Sweet...So Perverse (Umberto Lenzi, 1969; Italian: Così dolce...così perversa)
- The Doll of Satan (Ferruccio Casapinta, 1969; Italian: La bambola di Satana)
- Naked Violence (Fernando di Leo, 1969; Italian: Il ragazzi del massacro) aka The Boys Who Slaughter (UK)
- Carnal Circuit (Alberto De Martino, 1969; Italian: Femmine insaziabili)
- One on Top of the Other (Lucio Fulci, 1969; Italian: Una sull'altra) a.k.a.Perversion Story
- Murder by Music (Julio Buchs, 1969; Spanish: Las trompetas del apocalipsis/ Trumpets of the Apocalypse); starring Brett Halsey, Marilu Tolo
- The House That Screamed (Narciso Ibáñez Serrador, Spanish, 1969) a.k.a. La residencia, a.k.a. The Boarding School
- Death Knocks Twice (Harald Philipp, 1969; Italian: La morte bussa due volte) a.k.a. Blonde Bait for the Murderer, a.k.a. Hard Women, a.k.a. The Blonde Connection
- Double Face (Riccardo Freda, 1969; Italian: A doppia faccia) a.k.a.Liz et Helen
- Macabre (Javier Setó, 1969; Spanish: Viaje al vacío / Journey to Emptiness) a.k.a. The Invisible Assassin, a.k.a. Shadow of Death
- Orgasmo (Umberto Lenzi, 1969) released in USA as Paranoia

=== 1970s ===
- The Bird with the Crystal Plumage (Dario Argento, 1970; Italian: L'uccello dalle piume di cristallo) a.k.a. Phantom of Terror, a.k.a. The Gallery Murders
- Hatchet for the Honeymoon (Mario Bava, 1970; Italian: Il rosso segno della follia / The Red Mark of Madness) a.k.a. Blood Brides
- Paranoia (Umberto Lenzi, 1970) released in USA as A Quiet Place to Kill
- Five Dolls for an August Moon (Mario Bava, 1970; Italian: 5 bambole per la luna d'agosto) a.k.a. Island of Terror
- Death Occurred Last Night (Duccio Tessari, 1970; Italian: La morte risale a ieri sera
- A Suitcase for a Corpse (Alfonso Brescia, 1970; Italian: Il tuo dolce corpo da uccidere / Your Sweet Body to Murder)
- Your Hands on My Body (Brunello Rondi, 1970; Italian: Le tue mani sul mio corpo) a.k.a. Schocking
- Forbidden Photos of a Lady Above Suspicion (Luciano Ercoli, 1970; Italian: Le foto proibite di una signora per bene)
- Kill the Fatted Calf and Roast It (Salvatore Samperi, 1970; Italian: Uccidete il vitello grasso e arrostitelo)
- In the Folds of the Flesh (Sergio Bergonzelli, 1970; Italian: Nelle pieghe della carne)
- The Weekend Murders (Michele Lupo, 1970; Italian: Concerto per pistola solista) a.k.a. The Story of a Crime
- The Man with Icy Eyes (Alberto De Martino, 1971; Italian: L'uomo dagli occhi di ghiaccio)
- A Lizard in a Woman's Skin (Lucio Fulci, 1971; Italian: Una lucertola con la pelle di donna) a.k.a. Schizoid
- The Fifth Cord (Luigi Bazzoni, 1971; Italian: Giornata nera per l'ariete / Black Day for the Ram) a.k.a. Evil Fingers
- Oasis of Fear (Umberto Lenzi, 1971; Italian: Un posto ideale per uccidere / An Ideal Place to Kill) a.k.a. Dirty Pictures
- The Strange Vice of Mrs. Wardh (Sergio Martino, 1971; Italian: Lo strano vizio della Signora Wardh) a.k.a. Blade of the Ripper, a.k.a. Next!, a.k.a. The Next Victim
- The Case of the Scorpion's Tail (Sergio Martino, 1971; Italian: La coda dello scorpione / Tail of the Scorpion)
- Black Belly of the Tarantula (Paolo Cavara, 1971; Italian: La tarantola dal ventre nero)
- The Cat o' Nine Tails (Dario Argento, 1971; Italian: Il gatto a nove code)
- The Bloodstained Butterfly (Duccio Tessari, 1971; Italian: Una farfalla con le ali insanguinate) a.k.a. Secret of the Black Rose
- Four Flies on Grey Velvet (Dario Argento, 1971; Italian: 4 mosche di velluto grigio)
- Marta (José Antonio Nieves Conde, 1971; Italian: ...dopo di che, uccide il maschio e lo divora / Afterwards, It Kills and Devours the Male)
- The Double (Romolo Guerrieri, 1971; Italian: La Controfigura) a.k.a. Love Inferno
- Cross Current (Tonino Ricci, 1971; Italian: Un Omicidio perfetto a termine di legge / A Perfect Murder According to Law)
- The Iguana with the Tongue of Fire (Riccardo Freda, 1971; Italian: L'iguana dalla lingua di fuoco)
- A Bay of Blood (Mario Bava, 1971; Italian: Reazione a catena / Chain Reaction) a.k.a. Twitch of the Death Nerve, a.k.a. Ecologia del delitto / Ecology of Crime, a.k.a. Last House on the Left Part 2
- They Have Changed Their Face (Corrado Farina, 1971; Italian: Hanno cambiato faccia)
- The Designated Victim (Maurizio Lucidi, 1971; Italian: La vittima designata) a.k.a. Murder by Design
- Slaughter Hotel (Fernando Di Leo, 1971; Italian: La bestia uccide a sangue freddo / The Beast Kills in Cold Blood) a.k.a. Asylum Erotica, a.k.a. The Cold-Blooded Beast
- The Fourth Victim (Eugenio Martín, 1971; Italian: In fondo alla piscina / At the Front of the Pool) a.k.a.Death at the Deep End of the Pool, a.k.a.La ultima senora Anderson / The Last Mrs. Anderson, starring Carroll Baker
- The Devil Has Seven Faces (Osvaldo Civirani, 1971; Italian: Il diavolo ha sette facce) a.k.a. The Devil with Seven Faces
- Seven Murders for Scotland Yard (José Luis Madrid, 1971; Spanish: Jack el destripador de Londres/ Jack the Ripper of London) a.k.a. Seven Corpses for Scotland Yard
- Death Walks on High Heels (Luciano Ercoli, 1971; Italian: La morte cammina con i tacchi alti) stars Susan Scott
- The Short Night of the Glass Dolls (Aldo Lado, 1971; Italian: La corta notte delle bambole di vetro) a.k.a. Paralyzed
- Cold Eyes of Fear (Enzo G. Castellari, 1971; Italian: Gli occhi freddi della paura) a.k.a. Desperate Moments
- Human Cobras (Bitto Albertini, written by Ernesto Gastaldi, 1971; Italian: L'uomo più velenoso del cobra)
- In the Eye of the Hurricane (José María Forqué, 1971; Italian: La volpe dalla coda di velluto / The Fox with a Velvet Tail)
- The Glass Ceiling (Eloy de la Iglesia, 1971; Spanish: El techo de cristal) stars Carmen Sevilla, Patty Shepard and Emma Cohen
- Two Males for Alexa / Due maschi per Alexa (Juan Logar, 1971; Spanish: Fieras sin jaula/ Cageless Beasts) stars Rosalba Neri and Emma Cohen
- The Night Evelyn Came Out of the Grave (Emilio Miraglia, 1971; Italian: La notte che Evelyn uscì dalla tomba)
- The Great Swindle (José Antonio Nieves Conde, 1971; Spanish: Historia de una traición)
- Amuck! (Silvio Amadio, 1971; Italian: Alla ricerca del piacere / In Pursuit of Pleasure) a.k.a. Maniac Mansion, a.k.a. Leather and Whips, a.k.a. Hot Bed of Sex
- The Red Headed Corpse (Renzo Russo, 1972; Italian: La rossa dalla pelle che scotta) a.k.a. The Sensuous Doll
- The Case of the Bloody Iris (Giuliano Carnimeo, 1972; Italian: Perché quelle strane gocce di sangue sul corpo di Jennifer? / What Are Those Strange Drops of Blood on Jennifer's Body?)
- Don't Torture a Duckling (Lucio Fulci, 1972; Italian: Non si sevizia un paperino) a.k.a. The Long Night of Exorcism
- Who Killed the Prosecutor and Why? (Giuseppe Vari, 1972; Italian: Terza ipotesi su un caso di perfetta strategia criminale / Third hypothesis about a perfect criminal strategy case)
- Death Walks at Midnight (Luciano Ercoli, 1972: Italian: La morte accarezza a mezzanotte/ Death Caresses at Midnight) a.k.a. Cry Out in Terror
- Alta Tension / High Tension (Julio Buchs, 1972; Spanish: Doppia coppia con Regina) starring Helga Line, Marisa Mell
- An Open Tomb...An Empty Coffin (Alfonso Balcázar, 1972; Spanish: La casa de las muertas vivientes / House of the Living Dead Women) a.k.a. The Nights of the Scorpion
- Who Saw Her Die? (Aldo Lado, 1972; Italian: Chi l'ha vista morire?)
- My Dear Killer (Tonino Valerii, 1972; Italian: Mio caro assassino)
- Spirits of Death (Romano Scavolini, 1972; Italian: Un bianco vestito per Marialé/ A White Dress for Mariale) a.k.a. Exorcisme Tragique
- Your Vice Is a Locked Room and Only I Have the Key (Sergio Martino, 1972; Italian: Il tuo vizio è una stanza chiusa e solo io ne ho la chiave) a.k.a. Gently Before She Dies, a.k.a. Eye of the Black Cat, a.k.a. Excite Me!
- The French Sex Murders (Ferdinando Merighi, 1972; Italian: Casa d'appuntamento/ The House of Rendezvous) a.k.a. The Bogey Man and the French Murders
- Death Falls Lightly (Leopoldo Savona, 1972; Italian: La morte scende leggera)
- Smile Before Death (Silvio Amadio, 1972; Italian: Il sorriso della iena/ Smile of the Hyena)
- What Have You Done to Solange? (Massimo Dallamano, 1972; Italian: Cosa avete fatto a Solange?) a.k.a. Secret of the Green Pins, a.k.a. Who's Next?, a.k.a. Terror in the Woods
- Knife of Ice (Umberto Lenzi, 1972; Italian: Il coltello di ghiaccio)
- Eye in the Labyrinth (Mario Caiano, 1972; Italian: L'occhio nel labirinto) a.k.a. Blood, starring Alida Valli
- Murder Mansion (Francisco Lara Polop, 1972; Italian: Quando Marta urlò dalla tomba / When Marta Screamed from the Grave) a.k.a. The House in the Fog
- All the Colors of the Dark (Sergio Martino, 1972; Italian: Tutti i colori del buio) a.k.a. Day of the Maniac, a.k.a. They're Coming to Get You!
- The Killer is on the Phone (Alberto De Martino, 1972; Italian: L'assassino e' al telefono) a.k.a. Scenes From a Murder, starring Telly Savalas
- Tropic of Cancer (Edoardo Mulargia, 1972; Italian: Al Tropico del Cancro) a.k.a. Death in Haiti
- Love and Death in the Garden of the Gods (Sauro Scavolini, 1972; Italian: Amore e morte nel giardino degli dei)
- The Dead Are Alive (Armando Crispino, 1972; Italian: L'etrusco uccide ancora / The Etruscan Kills Again)
- So Sweet, So Dead (Roberto Montero, 1972; Italian: Rivelazione di un maniaco sessuale/ Revelations of a Sex Maniac) a.k.a. The Slasher is the Sex Maniac, a.k.a. Penetration
- Delirium (Renato Polselli, 1972; Italian: Delirio caldo)
- Seven Blood-Stained Orchids (Umberto Lenzi, 1972; Italian: Sette orchidee macchiate di rosso)
- The Crimes of the Black Cat (Sergio Pastore, 1972; Italian: Sette scialli di seta gialla / Seven Shawls of Yellow Silk)
- Naked Girl Killed in the Park (Alfonso Brescia, 1972; Italian: Ragazza tutta nuda assassinata nel parco) a.k.a. Naked Girl Found in the Park
- The Two Faces of Fear (Tulio Demicheli, 1972; Italian: I due volti della paura) a.k.a. Two Faces of Terror, starring Anita Strindberg, George Hilton
- The Weapon, the Hour, the Motive (Francesco Mazzei, 1972; Italian: L'arma, l'ora, il movente)
- The Red Queen Kills Seven Times (Emilio Miraglia, 1972; Italian: La dama rossa uccide sette volte) a.k.a. Blood Feast, a.k.a. Feast of Flesh
- The Cat in Heat (Nello Rossati, 1972; Italian: La gatta en calore)
- A.A.A. Masseuse, Good-Looking, Offers Her Services (Demofilo Fidani, 1972; Italian: A.A.A. Massaggiatrice bella presenza offresi...)
- Death Carries a Cane (Maurizio Pradeaux, 1973) Italian: Passi di danza su una lama di rasoio / Dance Steps on a Razor's Edge; a.k.a. Maniac at Large, a.k.a. Tormentor
- Torso (Sergio Martino, 1973; Italian: I corpi presentano tracce di violenza carnale / The Bodies Show Traces of Carnal Violence)
- The Deadly Triangle (Joaquín Luis Romero Marchent, 1973; Spanish El juego del adulterio / The Game of Adultery)
- The Flower with the Petals of Steel (Gianfranco Piccioli, 1973; Italian: Il fiore dai petali d'acciaio / The Flower with the Deadly Sting) starring Carroll Baker
- Seven Deaths in the Cat's Eye (Antonio Margheriti, 1973; Italian: La morte negli occhi del gatto / Death in the Eyes of the Cat)
- The Bloodstained Lawn (Riccardo Ghione, 1973; Italian: Il prato macchiato di rosso)
- The Sex of the Witch (Angelo Pannaccio, 1973; Italian: Il sesso della strega) starring Camille Keaton
- Love and Death on the Edge of a Razor (Giusseppe Pellegrini, 1973; Italian: Giorni d'amore sul filo di una lama) a.k.a.Muerte au Rasoir
- The Crimes of Petiot (José Luis Madrid, 1973; Spanish: Los crímenes de Petiot)
- Death Smiles on a Murderer (Joe D'Amato, 1973; Italian: La morte ha sorriso all'assassino)
- No One Heard the Scream (Eloy de la Iglesia, 1973; Spanish: Nadie oyó gritar stars Carmen Sevilla)
- Don't Look Now (Nicolas Roeg, 1973; Italian: A Venezia... un Dicembre rosso shocking / In Venice... a Shocking Red December)
- The Perfume of the Lady in Black (Francesco Barilli, 1974; Italian: Il profumo della signora in nero)
- Delitto d'autore (Mario Sabatini, 1974; translation: Copyright Crime) starring Sylva Koscina, Luigi Pistilli
- Blue Eyes of the Broken Doll (Carlos Aured, 1974; Spanish: Los ojos azules de la muñeca rota) a.k.a. House of Psychotic Women
- Five Women for the Killer (Stelvio Massi, 1974; Italian: Cinque donne per l'assassino)
- Spasmo (Umberto Lenzi, 1974)
- Puzzle (Duccio Tessari, 1974; Italian: L'uomo senza memoria / The Man Without a Memory)
- The Girl in Room 2A (William Rose, 1974, Italian: La casa della paura / The House of Fear) a.k.a. The Perversions of Mrs. Grant
- The Killer Reserved Nine Seats (Giuseppe Bennati, 1974; Italian: L'assassino ha riservato nove poltrone)
- What Have They Done to Your Daughters? (Massimo Dallamano, 1974; Italian: La polizia chiede aiuto / The Police Need Help) a.k.a. The Co-ed Murders
- Ciak...si muore (Mario Moroni, 1974; rough translation: Clack...You Die (as in the sound a clapboard makes))
- The Killer Is One of the Thirteen (Javier Aguirre, 1974; Spanish: El asesino está entre los trece)
- The Killer Wore Gloves (Juan Bosch, 1974; Spanish: La Muerte llama a las diez / Death Calls at Ten) a.k.a. Le calde labbra del carnefice / The Hot Lips of the Killer
- The Killer With a Thousand Eyes (Juan Bosch, 1974; Spanish: Los mil ojos del asesino) a.k.a. On The Edge
- The Fish With the Gold Eyes (Pedro Luis Ramírez, 1974, Spanish: El pez del los ojos de oro) starring Monserrat Prous
- Death Will Have Your Eyes (Giovanni D'Eramo, 1974; Italian: La moglie giovane/ The Young Wife) a.k.a. Triangle, a.k.a. Infamia
- Eyeball (Umberto Lenzi, 1975; Italian: Gatti rossi in un labirinto di vetro / Red Cats in a Glass Maze) a.k.a. Wide-Eyed in the Dark
- Autopsy (Armando Crispino, 1975; Italian: Macchie solari / Sunspots)
- The Killer Must Kill Again (Luigi Cozzi, 1975; Italian: L'assassino è costretto ad uccidere ancora) a.k.a. Il Ragno (The Spider), a.k.a. The Dark is Death's Friend
- Giochi erotici di una famiglia per bene/ Erotic Games of a Good Family (Francesco Degli Espinosa, 1975) starring Erica Blanc
- All the Screams of Silence (Ramón Barco, 1975, Spanish: Todo los gritos del silencio)
- A Dragonfly for Each Corpse (León Klimovsky, 1975; Spanish: Una libélula para cada muerto)
- La pelle sotto gli artigli/ The Skin Under the Claws (Alessandro Santini, 1975) starring Gordon Mitchell
- Footprints on the Moon (Luigi Bazzoni, 1975; Italian: Le orme/ Footsteps)
- Deep Red (Dario Argento, 1975; Italian: Profondo rosso) a.k.a.The Hatchet Murders
- Strip Nude for Your Killer (Andrea Bianchi, 1975) a.k.a. Nude per l'assassino
- The Killer is Not Alone (Jesus Garcia de Duenas, 1975; Spanish: El asesino no está solo) starring Maria Rohm
- Reflections in Black (Tano Cimarosa, 1975; Italian: Il vizio ha le calze nere / Vice Wears Black Hose)
- The Suspicious Death of a Minor (Sergio Martino, 1975; Italian: Morte sospetta di una minorenne) a.k.a. Too Young to Die
- The Bloodsucker Leads the Dance (Alfredo Rizzo, 1975; Italian: La sanguisuga conduce la danza) a.k.a. The Passion of Evelyn
- ...a tutte le auto della polizia (Mario Caiano, 1975; English: Calling All Police Cars) a.k.a. The Maniac Responsible
- Snapshot of a Crime (Mario Imperoli, 1975; Italian: Istantanea per un delitto)
- The Police Are Blundering in the Dark (Helia Colombo, 1975; Italian: La polizia brancola nel buio)
- Death has blue eyes (Nico Mastrokaris, 1976)
- The House with Laughing Windows (Pupi Avati, 1976; Italian: La casa dalle finestre che ridono)
- Plot of Fear (Paolo Cavara, 1976; Italian: E tanta paura/ Too Much Fear) a.k.a. Bloody Peanuts
- Death Haunts Monica (Ramón Fernández, 1976; Spanish: La Muerte Ronda a Monica) starring Jean Sorel
- Death Steps in the Dark (Maurizio Pradeaux, 1977; Italian: Passi di morte perduti nel buio)
- Crazy Desires of a Murderer (Filippo Walter Ratti, 1977; Italian: I vizi morbosi di una governante/ The Morbid Vices of a Housekeeper)
- The Psychic (Lucio Fulci, 1977) a.k.a. Sette note in nero, or Murder to the Tune of Seven Black Notes
- The Pyjama Girl Case (Flavio Mogherini, 1977; Italian: La ragazza dal pigiama giallo / The Girl in the Yellow Pyjamas)
- Watch Me When I Kill (Antonio Bido, 1977; Italian: Il gatto dagli occhi di giada / The Cat with the Jade Eyes) a.k.a. The Cat's Victims
- Nine Guests for a Crime (Ferdinando Baldi, 1977; Italian: 9 ospiti per un delitto) a.k.a. A Scream in the Night
- Hotel Fear (Francesco Barilli, 1978; Italian: Pensione Paura)
- The Sister of Ursula (Enzo Milioni, 1978; Italian: La sorella di Ursula) a.k.a. La muerte tiene ojos / Death Has Eyes, a.k.a. Ursula's Sister
- Red Rings of Fear (Alberto Negrin, 1978; Italian: Enigma rosso/ Red Enigma) a.k.a. Virgin Terror, a.k.a. Trauma, a.k.a. Rings of Fear
- The Bloodstained Shadow (Antonio Bido, 1978; Italian: Solamente nero / Only Blackness)
- L'immoralità (Massimo Pirri, 1978) a.k.a. Cock Crows at Eleven
- The Perfect Crime (Giuseppe Rosati, 1978; Italian: Indagine su un delitto perfetto/ Investigation of a Perfect Crime) starring Joseph Cotten, Paul Muller
- Trauma (Leon Klimovsky, 1978; Spanish: Violacion Fatal) starring Antonio Mayans
- Atrocious Tales of Love and Death (Sergio Corbucci, 1979; Italian: Giallo napoletano) a.k.a. Melodie meurtriere, a.k.a. Atrocious Tales of Love and Revenge
- Killer Nun (Giulio Berutti, 1979; Italian: Suir omicidi) a.k.a. Deadly Habit
- The Sky is Falling (Silvio Narizzano, 1979; Spanish: Las Flores del Vicio) a.k.a. Bloodbath, starring Carroll Baker
- Giallo a Venezia (Mario Landi, 1979) a.k.a. Giallo in Venice, a.k.a. Giallo, Venetian Style
- Play Motel (Mario Gariazzo, 1979)

=== 1980s ===
- Dressed to Kill (Brian de Palma, 1980)
- Trhauma (Gianni Martucci, 1980; Italian: Il mistero della casa maledetta / Mystery of the Cursed House) a.k.a. Thrauma
- Murder Obsession (Riccardo Freda, 1981; Italian: Follia omicida / Murder Madness) a.k.a. Fear, a.k.a. The Wailing, a.k.a. The Murder Syndrome
- The Secret of Seagull Island (Nestore Ungaro, 1981; Italian: L'isola del gabbiano) this was the feature version edited from a 1981 TV miniseries called Seagull Island; a British/Italian co-production
- Inferno (Dario Argento, 1980)
- Madhouse (Ovidio Assonitis, 1981) a.k.a. There Was a Little Girl, a.k.a. And When She Was Bad
- Nightmare (Romano Scavolini, 1981) a.k.a. Nightmares in a Damaged Brain
- Pieces (Juan Piquer Simón, 1982)
- Tenebrae (Dario Argento, 1982) a.k.a. Unsane
- The Scorpion with Two Tails (Sergio Martino, 1982; Italian: Assassinio al cimitero etrusco / Murder in the Etruscan Cemetery)
- The New York Ripper (Lucio Fulci, 1982; Italian: Lo squartatore di New York)
- Delitto carnale (Cesare Canaveri, 1982; English: Carnal Crime) a.k.a. Killing of the Flesh, a.k.a. Sensual Murder; also released as a hardcore adult version
- A Blade in the Dark (Lamberto Bava, 1983; Italian: La casa con la scala nel buio / The House with the Dark Staircase)
- Blood Link (Alberto De Martino, 1983) a.k.a. Extrasensorial
- The House of the Yellow Carpet (Carlo Lizzani, 1983; Italian: La casa del tappeto giallo)
- Murder Rock (Lucio Fulci, 1984; Italian: Murderock – uccide a passo di danza) a.k.a. The Demon Is Loose!, a.k.a. Murder Rock – Dancing Death
- Nothing Underneath (Carlo Vanzina, 1985; Italian: Sotto il vestito niente / Nothing Underneath the Dress) a.k.a. The Last Shot
- Formula for a Murder (Alberto De Martino, 1985) a.k.a. 7 Hyden Park – La casa maledetta / 7 Hyde Park - The Cursed House
- Phenomena (Dario Argento, 1985) a.k.a. Creepers
- Black Octopus (Marta Reguera, 1985; Spanish: Pulpo Negro) made for Argentinian TV
- The House of the Blue Shadows (Beppe Cino, 1986; Italian: La casa del buon ritorno) a.k.a. The House with the Blue Shutters
- The Killer is Still Among Us (Camillo Teti, 1986; Italian: L'assassino è ancora tra noi)
- You'll Die at Midnight (Lamberto Bava, 1986; Italian: Morirai a mezzanotte) a.k.a. The Midnight Killer, a.k.a. Midnight Horror
- The Monster of Florence (Cesare Ferrario, 1986; Italian: Il mostro di firenze) a.k.a. Night Ripper
- Body Count (Ruggero Deodato, 1986; Italian: Camping Del Terrore)
- Delitti (Giovanna Lenzi, 1987; English: Crimes)
- Sweets from a Stranger (Franco Ferrini, 1987; Italian: Caramelle da uno sconosciuto)
- Stage Fright (Michele Soavi, 1987; Italian: Deliria) a.k.a. Aquarius, a.k.a. Bloody Bird
- Delirium (Lamberto Bava, 1987; Italian: Le foto di Gioia / Photos of Gioia)
- Opera (Dario Argento, 1987) a.k.a. Terror at the Opera
- Phantom of Death (Ruggero Deodato, 1988; Italian: Un delitto poco comune / An Uncommon Crime) a.k.a. Off Balance
- Too Beautiful to Die (Dario Piana, 1988; Italian: Sotto il vestito niente 2 / Nothing Underneath 2)
- Dial: Help (Ruggero Deodato, 1988; Italian: Minaccia d'amore / Love Threat)
- Delitti e profumi (Vittorio De Sisti, 1988; English: Crimes and Perfume)
- Obsession: A Taste for Fear (Piccio Raffanini, 1988; Italian: Pathos: Un sapore di paura)
- The Murder Secret (Mario Bianchi, Lucio Fulci, 1988; Italian: Non aver paura della zia Marta / Don't Be Afraid of Aunt Martha) a.k.a.Aunt Martha Does Dreadful Things
- Massacre (Andrea Bianchi, 1989)
- Nightmare Beach (Umberto Lenzi, 1989) a.k.a. Welcome To Spring Break (slasher film)
- Dangerous Women (Luigi Russo, 1989; Italian: Le Diaboliche) a.k.a. Una donna senza nome / Woman Without a Name
- Dark Bar (Stelio Fiorenza, 1989) starring Barbara Cupisti
- Arabella, the Black Angel (Stelvio Massi, 1989) a.k.a. Black Angel
- American Rickshaw (Sergio Martino, 1989) starring Donald Pleasence
- Fashion Crimes (Bruno Gaburro, 1989; Italian: La morte è di moda)

=== 1990s ===
- Homicide in Blue Light (Alfonso Brescia, 1991; Italian: Omicidio a luci blu) starring David Hess
- Misteria (Lamberto Bava, 1992) a.k.a. Body Puzzle; starring Joanna Pacula and Erika Blanc
- Circle of Fear (Aldo Lado, 1992) a.k.a.The Perfect Alibi; starring Burt Young
- Trauma (Dario Argento, 1993) a.k.a.Dario Argento's Trauma
- The Washing Machine (Ruggero Deodato, 1993; Italian: Vortice Mortale) filmed in Hungary
- Dangerous Attraction (Bruno Mattei, 1993) starring David Warbeck
- Gli occhi dentro (Bruno Mattei, 1993) a.k.a. Madness, a.k.a. Occhi Senza Volto / Eyes Without a Face
- Omicidio al Telefono (Bruno Mattei, 1994; Italian: Murder by Telephone) a.k.a. L'assassino e al telefono / The Killer is on the Phone
- The Strange Story of Olga O (Antonio Bonifacio, 1995) written by Ernesto Gastaldi, starring Florinda Bolkan
- The Killer's the One with the Yellow Shoes / L'assassino e' guello con le scarpe gialle (Filippo Otoni, 1995)
- The Stendhal Syndrome (Dario Argento, 1996; Italian: La sindrome di Stendhal)
- The House Where Corinne Lived (Maurizio Lucidi, 1996; Italian: La casa dove abitava Corinne) made for TV movie
- Fatal Frames (Al Festa, 1996) starring David Warbeck, Donald Pleasence and Linnea Quigley
- Wax Mask (Sergio Stivaletti, 1997; Italian: M.D.C. – Maschera di cera)
- Milonga (Emidio Greco, 1999)
- Mozart is a Murderer (Sergio Martino, 1999; Italian : Mozart è un assassino)

=== 2000s ===
- Sleepless (Dario Argento, 2001; Italian: Non ho sonno)
- Red Riding Hood (Giacomo Cimini, 2003)
- Bad Inclination (Pierfrancesco Campanella, 2003: Italian: Cattive inclinazioni)
- The Card Player (Dario Argento, 2004; Italian: Il cartaio)
- Eyes of Crystal (Eros Puglielli, 2004; Italian: Occhi di cristallo)
- The Vanity Serum (Alex Infascelli, 2004; Italian: Il siero della vanità)
- Do You Like Hitchcock? (Dario Argento, 2005; Italian: Ti piace Hitchcock?)
- Giallo (Dario Argento, 2009)

=== 2010s ===
- Symphony in Blood Red (Luigi Pastore, 2010)
- The Last Fashion Show (Carlo Vanzina, 2011; Italian: Sotto il vestito niente – L'ultima sfilata / Nothing Underneath: The Last Fashion Show)
- Tulpa (film) (Federico Zampaglione, 2012; Italian: Tulpa – Perdizioni mortali ) written by Dardano Sacchetti
- Sonno Profondo (Luciano Onetti, 2013)
- Francesca (Luciano Onetti, 2015)
- Abrakadabra (Luciano Onetti, 2018)

=== 2020s ===
- Dark Glasses (Dario Argento, 2022; Italian: Occhiali Neri)
