= List of thriller films of the 1970s =

A list of thriller films released in the 1970s.

| Title | Director | Cast | Country | Subgenre/notes |
|---|---|---|---|---|
1970
| And Soon the Darkness | Robert Fuest | Pamela Franklin, Michele Dotrice, Sandor Eles | United Kingdom | |
| The Bird with the Crystal Plumage | Dario Argento | Tony Musante, Suzy Kendall, Eva Renzi | Italy; West Germany | |
| The Breach | Claude Chabrol | Stéphane Audran, Jean-Pierre Cassel, Michel Bouquet | France; Italy; Belgium | |
| The Butcher | Claude Chabrol | Stéphane Audran, Jean Yanne | France; Italy | |
| Le Cercle rouge | Jean-Pierre Melville | Alain Delon, Bourvil, Gian Maria Volonté, Yves Montand | France; Italy | |
| Cold Sweat | Terence Young | Charles Bronson, Liv Ullmann, Jill Ireland | France; Italy | |
| Colossus: The Forbin Project | Joseph Sargent | Eric Braeden, Susan Clark, Gordon Pinsent | United States | |
| Dernier domicile connu | José Giovanni | Lino Ventura, Marlène Jobert, Michel Constantin | France; Italy | |
| Five Dolls for an August Moon | Mario Bava | William Berger, Edwige Fenech, Renato Rossini | Italy | |
| Fragment of Fear | Richard Sarafian | David Hemmings, Gayle Hunnicutt, Flora Robson | United Kingdom | |
| Hatchet for the Honeymoon | Mario Bava | Femi Benussi, Laura Betti, Alan Collin | Italy; Spain | |
| La Horse | Pierre Granier-Deferre | Jean Gabin, Elenore Hirt, André Weber | France; Italy; West Germany | Crime thriller |
| The Kremlin Letter | John Huston | Bibi Andersson, Richard Boone, Nigel Green | United States | |
| Nelle pieghe della carne | Sergio Bergonzelli | Eleonora Rossi-Drago | Italy | |
| Nightmares Come at Night | Jesús Franco | Diana Lorys | Liechtenstein | |
| Qui? | Leonard Keigel | Romy Schneider, Maurice Ronet, Gabriele Tinti | France; Italy | |
| Rider on the Rain | René Clément | Marlène Jobert, Charles Bronson, Annie Cordy | France; Italy | |
1971
| The Abominable Dr. Phibes | Robert Fuest | Vincent Price, Joseph Cotten | United Kingdom | horror |
| Kuheli | Tarun Majumdar | Biswajit Chatterjee, Sandhya Roy | India | horror |
| L'aiguana della lingua di fuoco | Riccardo Freda | Dominique Boschero, Werner Pochath | Italy; France; West Germany | |
| The Anderson Tapes | Sidney Lumet | Sean Connery, Dyan Cannon, Martin Balsam | United States | |
| The Andromeda Strain | Robert Wise | Arthur Hill, David Wayne, James Olson | United States | |
| Black Belly of the Tarantula | Paolo Cavara | Giancarlo Giannini, Claudine Auger, Barbara Bouchet | Italy | Horror thriller |
| The Case of the Scorpion's Tail | Sergio Martino | George Hilton, Luigi Pistilli, Janine Reynaud | Italy; Spain | |
| Le casse | Henri Verneuil | Jean-Paul Belmondo, Omar Sharif, Dyan Cannon | France | Crime thriller |
| The Cat o' Nine Tails | Dario Argento | Emilio Marchesini, Vittorio Congia | West Germany; Italy; France | |
| Cold Eyes of Fear | Enzo G. Castellari | Gianni Garko, Franco Marletta, Julián Mateos | Italy; Spain | |
| The Deadly Trap | René Clément | Faye Dunaway, Frank Langella, Barbara Parkins | France; Italy | |
| Death Walks on High Heels | Luciano Ercoli | Nieves Navarro, Frank Wolff, Simon Andreu | Italy | |
| The Devil with Seven Faces | Osvaldo Civirani | Carroll Baker, Stephen Boyd, George Hilton | Italy | |
| Dirty Harry | Don Siegel | Clint Eastwood, Harry Guardino, Reni Santoni, Andrew Robinson | United States | |
| $ | Richard Brooks | Warren Beatty, Goldie Hawn, Gert Fröbe | United States | Comedy thriller |
| Duel | Steven Spielberg | Dennis Weaver, Jacqueline Scott, Eddie Firestone | United States | |
| The Fifth Cord | Luigi Bazzoni | Wolfgang Preiss, Franco Nero | Italy | |
| Four Flies on Grey Velvet | Dario Argento | Michael Brandon | Italy; France | |
| The French Connection | William Friedkin | Gene Hackman, Roy Scheider, Fernando Rey | United States | Action thriller |
| Fright | Peter Collinson | Tara Collinson | United Kingdom | |
| Get Carter | Mike Hodges | Michael Caine, Ian Hendry, Britt Ekland | United Kingdom | Crime thriller |
| Gumshoe | Stephen Frears | Albert Finney, Billie Whitelaw, Frank Finlay | United Kingdom | |
| Klute | Alan J. Pakula | Jane Fonda, Donald Sutherland | United States | |
| A Lizard in a Woman's Skin | Lucio Fulci | Florinda Bolkan, Stanley Baker | Italy; France; Spain | |
| Play Misty for Me | Clint Eastwood | Clint Eastwood, Jessica Walter, Donna Mills | United States | |
| Pretty Maids All in a Row | Roger Vadim | Rock Hudson, Angie Dickinson, Angie Dickinson | United States | Comedy thriller |
| The Resurrection of Zachary Wheeler | Robert Wynn | Richard Schuyler, Jim Healey | United States | |
| See No Evil | Richard Fleischer | Mia Farrow, Dorothy Alison, Robin Bailey | United Kingdom | |
| Shaft | Gordon Parks | Richard Roundtree, Moses Gunn, Charles Cioffi | United States | Crime thriller |
| Lo strano vizio della signora Wardh | Sergio Martino | George Hilton, Ivan Rassimov | Italy; Spain | |
| Straw Dogs | Sam Peckinpah | Dustin Hoffman, Susan George, Peter Vaughan | United Kingdom | |
| Vanishing Point | Richard C. Sarafian | Barry Newman, Cleavon Little, Dean Jagger | United States | Action thriller |
| What's the Matter with Helen? | Curtis Harrington | Debbie Reynolds, Shelley Winters, Dennis Weaver | United States | |
1972
| And Hope to Die | René Clément | Jean-Louis Trintignant, Robert Ryan, Lea Massari | France; Italy | |
| L'Attentat | Yves Boisset | Michel Piccoli, Jean-Louis Trintignant, Jean Seberg | France; Italy | |
| The Case of the Bloody Iris | Giuliano Carmineo, Anthony Ascott | Edwige Fenech, George Hilton, Annabella Incontrera | Italy | |
| Dead Pigeon on Beethoven Street | Samuel Fuller | Glenn Corbett, Christa Lang, Anton Diffring | West Germany | |
| Don't Torture a Duckling | Lucio Fulci | Florinda Bolkan, Barbara Bouchet, Tomas Milian | Italy | |
| Fear Is the Key | Michael Tuchner | Barry Newman, Suzy Kendall, John Vernon | United Kingdom | |
| Fist of Fury | Lo Wei | Bruce Lee | Hong Kong | Action thriller |
| Un flic | Jean-Pierre Melville | Alain Delon, Catherine Deneuve, Richard Crenna | France | Crime thriller |
| Frenzy | Alfred Hitchcock | Jon Finch, Barry Foster | United States; United Kingdom | |
| The Getaway | Sam Peckinpah | Steve McQueen, Ali MacGraw, Ben Johnson | United States | Action thriller, crime thriller |
| Images | Robert Altman | Susannah York, René Auberjonois | United States; United Kingdom | |
| The Mechanic | Michael Winner | Charles Bronson, Keenan Wynn, Jan-Michael Vincent | United States | Crime thriller |
| La Morte Accarezza a Mezzanotte | Luciano Ercoli | Nieves Navarro, Simon Andreu, Pietro Martellanz | Italy; Spain | |
| The Other | Robert Mulligan | Uta Hagen, Diana Muldaur, Chris Udvarnoky | United States | |
| Prime Cut | Michael Ritchie | Lee Marvin, Gene Hackman, Angel Tompkins, Sissy Spacek | United States | |
| Pulp | Mike Hodges | Michael Caine, Mickey Rooney, Lionel Stander | United Kingdom | Comedy thriller |
| Seven Blood-Stained Orchids | Umberto Lenzi | Pier Paolo Capponi, Franco Fantasia, Uschi Glas | West Germany; Italy | |
| Sleuth | Joseph L. Mankiewicz | Laurence Olivier, Michael Caine | United Kingdom | Psychological thriller |
| State of Siege | Costa-Gavras | Yves Montand, Renato Salvatori, O.E. Hasse | France; Italy; West Germany | |
| Straight on Till Morning | Peter Collinson | Tom Bell, Harold Berens, James Bolam | United Kingdom | |
| What Have You Done to Solange? | Massimo Dallamano | Joachim Fuchsberger, Camille Keaton, Fabio Testi | West Germany; Italy | |
| Who Saw Her Die? | Aldo Lado | Dominique Boschero, Adolfo Celi, Peter Chatel | Italy; West Germany | |
| Whoever Slew Auntie Roo? | Curtis Harrington | Shelley Winters, Mark Lester, Ralph Richardson | United Kingdom; United States | Psychological thriller |
| You'll Like My Mother | Lamont Johnson | Patty Duke, Rosemary Murphy, Richard Thomas | United States | |
1973
| Charley Varrick | Don Siegel | Walter Matthau, Joe Don Baker, Felicia Farr | United States | Action thriller, crime thriller |
| The Crazies | George A. Romero | Edith Bell, Lane Carroll, Will Disney | United States | Action thriller |
| The Day of the Dolphin | Mike Nichols | George C. Scott, Trish VanDevere, Paul Sorvino | United States | |
| Don't Look Now | Nicolas Roeg | Julie Christie, Donald Sutherland | United Kingdom; Italy | |
| The Day of the Jackal | Fred Zinnemann | Edward Fox, Michel Lonsdale | United Kingdom; France | |
| Enter the Dragon | Robert Clouse | Bruce Lee, John Saxon, Jim Kelly | United States; Hong Kong | Action thriller |
| Executive Action | David Miller | Burt Lancaster, Robert Ryan, Will Geer | United States | |
| The Laughing Policeman | Stuart Rosenberg | Walter Matthau, Bruce Dern, Louis Gossett Jr. | United States | |
| Live and Let Die | Guy Hamilton | Roger Moore, Jane Seymour, Yaphet Kotto | United Kingdom | |
| The Long Goodbye | Robert Altman | Elliott Gould, Nina Van Pallandt | United States | |
| The MacKintosh Man | John Huston | Paul Newman, Dominique Sanda, James Mason | United Kingdom | |
| Magnum Force | Ted Post | Clint Eastwood, Hal Holbrook, Mitchell Ryan | United States | Action thriller |
| Night Flight from Moscow | Henri Verneuil | Yul Brynner, Henry Fonda, Dirk Bogarde | West Germany; France; Italy | Psychological thriller |
| The Outfit | John Flynn | Robert Duvall, Karen Black, Joe Don Baker | United States | Crime thriller |
| The Outside Man | Jacques Deray | Jean-Louis Trintignant, Ann-Margret, Roy Scheider | France; Italy | Action thriller, crime thriller |
| The Pyx | Harvey Hart | Louise Rinfret | Canada | |
| Quelques messieurs trop tranquilles | Georges Lautner | André Pousse, Jean Lefebvre, Dani | France | |
| Scorpio | Michael Winner | Burt Lancaster, Alain Delon, Paul Scofield | United States | |
| Shamus | Buzz Kulik | Burt Reynolds, Dyan Cannon, John Ryan | United States | Comedy thriller |
| Le Silencieux | Claude Pinoteau | Lino Ventura, Lea Massari, Suzanne Flon | France; Italy | Spy thriller |
| Sisters | Brian De Palma | Margot Kidder, Jennifer Salt | United States | |
| Thriller – A Cruel Picture | Bo Arne Vibenius | Christina Lindberg | Sweden | Action thriller |
| Torso | Sergio Martino | Angela Covello, Carla Brait, Patricia Adiutori | Italy | |
| Shock Treatment | Alain Jessua | Alain Delon, Annie Girardot, Robert Hirsch | France; Italy | |
| La Valise | Georges Lautner | Mireille Darc, Michel Constantin, Jean-Pierre Marielle | France | Comedy thriller |
| Westworld | Michael Crichton | Yul Brynner, Richard Benjamin, James Brolin | United States | Science fiction thriller |
| Wicked, Wicked | Richard L. Bare | Indira Danks, Kirk Bates | United States | |
1974
| Act of Vengeance | Bob Kelljan | Jo Ann Harris, Peter Brown, Jennifer Lee | United States | Crime thriller |
| Bad Ronald | Buzz Kulik | Scott Jacoby, Pippa Scott, John Larch | United States | |
| Black Christmas | Bob Clark | Olivia Hussey, Keir Dullea, Margot Kidder, John Saxon | Canada | Psychological thriller, paranoid thriller |
| The Black Windmill | Don Siegel | Michael Caine, Donald Pleasence, Delphine Seyrig | United Kingdom | |
| Borsalino & Co. | Jacques Deray | Alain Delon, Riccardo Cucciolla, Catherine Rouvel | West Germany; Italy; France | |
| Bring Me the Head of Alfredo Garcia | Sam Peckinpah | Warren Oates, Isela Vega, Gig Young | United States | Action thriller |
| The Centerfold Girls | John Peyser | Aldo Ray, Kitty Carl, Jeremy Slate | United States | |
| The Conversation | Francis Ford Coppola | Gene Hackman, John Cazale, Allen Garfield | United States | |
| Death Wish | Michael Winner | Charles Bronson, Hope Lange, Vincent Gardenia | United States | |
| Juggernaut | Richard Lester | Richard Harris, Omar Sharif, David Hemmings | United Kingdom | Action thriller |
| Macon County Line | Richard Compton | Cheryl Waters, Joan Blackman, Geoffrey Lewis | United States | |
| Nada | Claude Chabrol | Fabio Testi, Maurice Garrel, Mariangela Melato | France; Italy | |
| Nuits Rouges | Georges Franju | Gayle Hunnicutt, Jacques Champreux, Josephine Chaplin | France; Italy | |
| The Odessa File | Ronald Neame | Jon Voight, Maximilian Schell, Maria Schell | West Germany; United Kingdom | Political thriller |
| The Parallax View | Alan J. Pakula | Warren Beatty, Hume Cronyn, William Daniels, Paula Prentiss | United States | |
| Il Profumo della Signora in Nero | Francesco Barilli | | Italy | |
| Rabid Dogs | Mario Bava, Lamberto Bava | Riccardo Cucciolla, Lea Lander, Maurice Poli | Italy | |
| The Secret | Robert Enrico | Jean-Louis Trintignant, Philippe Noiret, Marlène Jobert | France | |
| Les Seins de glace | Georges Lautner | Claude Brasseur, Alain Delon, Nicoletta Machiavelli | France; Italy | |
| Spasmo | Umberto Lenzi | Guido Alberti, Robert Hoffmann, Suzy Kendall | Italy | |
| Street Law | Enzo G. Castellari | Renzo Palmer, Franco Nero, Gian Carlo Prete | Italy | |
| The Sugarland Express | Steven Spielberg | Goldie Hawn, Ben Johnson, William Atherton | United States | Crime thriller, Drama |
| The Taking of Pelham One Two Three | Joseph Sargent | Walter Matthau, Robert Shaw, Martin Balsam, Hector Elizondo | United States | |
1975
| Adieu poulet | Pierre Granier-Deferre | Lino Ventura, Patrick Dewaere, Victor Lanoux | France | |
| L'Agression | Gérard Pirès | Jean-Louis Trintignant, Catherine Deneuve, Claude Brasseur | France; Italy | Action thriller, crime thriller |
| Brannigan | Douglas Hickox | John Wayne, Richard Attenborough, Judy Geeson | United Kingdom | |
| The Bullet Train | Junya Sato | Ken Takakura, Kei Yamamoto, Ken Utsui | Japan | Action thriller |
| Deep Red | Dario Argento | David Hemmings, Daria Nicolodi, Gabriele Lavia | Italy | |
| The Drowning Pool | Stuart Rosenberg | Paul Newman, Joanne Woodward, Anthony Franciosa | United States | |
| Farewell, My Lovely | Dick Richards | Robert Mitchum, Charlotte Rampling, John Ireland, Sylvia Miles | United States | |
| Flic Story | Jacques Deray | Alain Delon, Jean-Louis Trintignant, Renato Salvatori | France; Italy | |
| French Connection II | John Frankenheimer | Gene Hackman, Fernando Rey, Bernard Fresson | United States | Action thriller |
| Hustle | Robert Aldrich | Burt Reynolds, Catherine Deneuve, Ben Johnson | United States | |
| Il Faut Vivre Dangereusement | Claude Makovski | Claude Brasseur, Annie Girardot, Sydne Rome | France | Comedy thriller |
| Les innocents aux mains sales | Claude Chabrol | Rod Steiger, Romy Schneider, Paolo Giusti | France; West Germany; Italy | |
| Jaws | Steven Spielberg | Roy Scheider, Robert Shaw, Richard Dreyfuss | United States | horror |
| Wanted: Babysitter | René Clément | Maria Schneider, Sydne Rome, Robert Vaughn | West Germany; France; Italy | Crime thriller, psychological thriller |
| The Killer Elite | Sam Peckinpah | James Caan, Robert Duvall, Arthur Hill | United States | |
| The Killer Must Kill Again | Luigi Cozzi | George Hilton | Italy | |
| Nude per l'assassino | Andrea Bianchi | Femi Benussi, Edwige Fenech, Erna Schurer | Italy | |
| Peur sur la ville | Henri Verneuil | Jean-Paul Belmondo, Charles Denner, Adalberto Maria Merli | France; Italy | |
| Psychic Killer | Ray Danton | Jim Hutton, Paul Burke, Julie Adams | United States | |
| The Stepford Wives | Bryan Forbes | Katharine Ross, Paula Prentiss, Peter Masterson | United States | |
| Three Days of the Condor | Sydney Pollack | Robert Redford, Faye Dunaway, Cliff Robertson, Max von Sydow, John Houseman | United States | |
| The Wilby Conspiracy | Ralph Nelson | Sidney Poitier, Michael Caine, Nicol Williamson | United Kingdom | |
1976
| Alice, Sweet Alice | Alfred Sole | Linda G. Miller, Mildred Clinton, Paula Sheppard | United States | |
| The Hunter Will Get You | Philippe Labro | Jean-Paul Belmondo, Bruno Cremer, Patrick Fierry | France | |
| Assault on Precinct 13 | John Carpenter | Austin Stoker, Gilbert De la Pena, Darwin Joston | United States | Action thriller |
| Brotherhood of Death | Richard F. Barker, Bill Berry | Roy Jefferson, Le Tari, Haskell Anderson | United States | Action thriller |
| Cadaveri Eccellenti | Francesco Rosi | Lino Ventura, Alain Cuny, Paolo Bonacelli | Italy; France | |
| Carrie | Brian De Palma | Sissy Spacek, Piper Laurie, Amy Irving, Nancy Allen, John Travolta, William Katt, Betty Buckley | United States | Supernatural thriller |
| The Cassandra Crossing | George Pan Cosmatos | Richard Harris, Ava Gardner, Sophia Loren, Martin Sheen, O. J. Simpson | United Kingdom; West Germany; Italy | |
| Comme un boomerang | José Giovanni | Alain Delon, Charles Vanel, Carla Gravina | France; Italy | Crime thriller |
| Le Corps de mon ennemi | Henri Verneuil | Jean-Paul Belmondo, Bernard Blier, Marie-France Pisier | France | |
| The Enforcer | James Fargo | Clint Eastwood, Harry Guardino, Bradford Dillman | United States | |
| Family Plot | Alfred Hitchcock | Karen Black, Bruce Dern, Barbara Harris, William Devane | United States | |
| The House with Laughing Windows | Pupi Avati | Lino Capolicchio, Francesca Marciano | Italy | |
| Invisible Strangler | John Florea | Robert Foxworth, Stefanie Powers, Elke Sommer | United States | |
| The Little Girl Who Lives Down the Lane | Nicolas Gessner | Jodie Foster, Martin Sheen, Alexis Smith | Canada; France | |
| The Man on the Roof | Bo Widerberg | Gus Dahlstrom, Harald Hamrell, Thomas Hellberg | Sweden | |
| Marathon Man | John Schlesinger | Dustin Hoffman, Laurence Olivier, Roy Scheider, William Devane, Marthe Keller | United States | |
| New Fist of Fury | Lo Wei | Jackie Chan | Hong Kong | Action thriller |
| Obsession | Brian De Palma | Cliff Robertson, Geneviève Bujold, John Lithgow | United States | |
| The Omen | Richard Donner | Gregory Peck, Lee Remick | United States; United Kingdom | Supernatural thriller, horror |
| Police Python 357 | Alain Corneau | Yves Montand, Simone Signoret, François Périer | France | |
| Silver Streak | Arthur Hiller | Gene Wilder, Jill Clayburgh, Richard Pryor | United States | |
| The Tenant | Roman Polanski | Roman Polanski, Isabelle Adjani, Melvyn Douglas, Shelley Winters | France; United States | |
| The Town That Dreaded Sundown | Charles B. Pierce | Ben Johnson, Andrew Prine, Dawn Wells | United States | Crime thriller |
| Two-Minute Warning | Larry Peerce | Charlton Heston, John Cassavetes, Martin Balsam, Beau Bridges | United States | |
1977
| Anima persa | Dino Risi | Vittorio Gassman, Catherine Deneuve, Danilo Mattei | France; Italy | |
| Armaguedon | Alain Jessua | Alain Delon, Jean Yanne, Renato Salvatori | France; Italy | |
| Black Sunday | John Frankenheimer | Robert Shaw, Bruce Dern, Marthe Keller | United States | Action thriller |
| The Car | Elliot Silverstein | James Brolin, Kathleen Lloyd, John Marley | United States | Supernatural thriller |
| Death of a Corrupt Man | Georges Lautner | Alain Delon, Ornella Muti, Stéphane Audran | France | |
| Demon Seed | Donald Cammell | Julie Christie, Fritz Weaver | United States | science fiction thriller |
| The Domino Principle | Stanley Kramer | Gene Hackman, Candice Bergen, Richard Widmark, Mickey Rooney | United States | |
| Le Gang | Jacques Deray | Alain Delon, Roland Bertin, Nicole Calfa | France; Italy | Crime thriller |
| The Gauntlet | Clint Eastwood | Clint Eastwood, Sondra Locke, Pat Hingle | United States | Action thriller |
| Hitch-Hike | Pasquale Festa Campanile | Corinne Cléry, David Hess, John Loffredo | Italy | |
| Le Juge Fayard dit Le Shériff | Yves Boisset | Patrick Dewaere, Aurore Clément, Philippe Léotard | France; Italy | |
| La Menace | Alain Corneau | Yves Montand, Marie Dubois, Carole Laure | France; Canada | |
| Rollercoaster | James Goldstone | George Segal, Timothy Bottoms, Henry Fonda, Richard Widmark | United States | Action thriller |
| Rolling Thunder | John Flynn | William Devane, Tommy Lee Jones, Linda Haynes | United States | Action thriller |
| Sette note in nero | Lucio Fulci | Jennifer O'Neill, Gabriele Ferzetti, Marc Porel | Italy | |
| Sleeping Dogs | Roger Donaldson | Sam Neill, Bernard Kearns, Nevan Rowe | New Zealand | |
| Telefon | Don Siegel | Charles Bronson, Lee Remick, Donald Pleasence | United States | Action thriller |
| Twilight's Last Gleaming | Robert Aldrich | Burt Lancaster, Richard Widmark, Charles Durning | West Germany; United States | |
1978
| The Big Sleep | Michael Winner | Robert Mitchum, Sarah Miles, Richard Boone, Candy Clark | United Kingdom | |
| The Boys From Brazil | Franklin J. Schaffner | Gregory Peck, Laurence Olivier, James Mason | United States | |
| Capricorn One | Peter Hyams | Elliott Gould, James Brolin, Sam Waterston, O.J. Simpson, Karen Black, Brenda Vaccaro | United States | |
| Coma | Michael Crichton | Geneviève Bujold, Michael Douglas, Elizabeth Ashley | United States | |
| Dossier 51 | Michel Deville | François Marthouret, Daniel Mesguich, Roger Planchon | France | |
| The Driver | Walter Hill | Ryan O'Neal, Bruce Dern, Isabelle Adjani | United States | Crime thriller |
| Enigma Rosso | Alberto Negrin | Ivan Desny, Christine Kaufmann, Fabio Testi | Italy; Spain; West Germany | |
| Eyes of Laura Mars | Irvin Kershner | Faye Dunaway, Tommy Lee Jones, Brad Dourif, Rene Auberjonois, Raul Julia | United States | |
| The Fury | Brian De Palma | Kirk Douglas, John Cassavetes, Carrie Snodgress, Amy Irving | United States | |
| Good Guys Wear Black | Ted Post | Chuck Norris, Anne Archer, Lloyd Haynes | United States | Action thriller |
| Halloween | John Carpenter | Donald Pleasence, Jamie Lee Curtis | United States | Horror |
| Invasion of the Body Snatchers | Philip Kaufman | Donald Sutherland, Brooke Adams, Leonard Nimoy | United States | |
| Jaws 2 | Jeannot Szwarc | Roy Scheider, Lorraine Gary, Murray Hamilton | United States | Horror |
| Long Weekend | Colin Eggleston | John Hargreaves, Briony Behet, Michael Aitkens | United States | |
| Magic | Richard Attenborough | Anthony Hopkins, Ann-Margret, Burgess Meredith | United States | |
| The Medusa Touch | Jack Gold | Richard Burton, Lino Ventura, Lee Remick | France; United Kingdom | |
| Patrick | Richard Franklin | Susan Penhaligon, Robert Helpmann, Rod Mullinar | Australia | |
| The Silent Partner | Daryl Duke | Susannah York, Christopher Plummer, Elliott Gould | Canada | |
| Solamente nero | Antonio Bido | Massimo Serato, Craig Hill, Stefania Casini | United States | |
| Tendre poulet | Philippe de Broca | Annie Girardot, Philippe Noiret, Catherine Alric | France | Comedy thriller |
| Un papillon sur l'épaule | Jacques Deray | Lino Ventura, Nicole Garcia, Claudine Auger | France | |
1979
| The Amityville Horror | Stuart Rosenberg | James Brolin, Margot Kidder, Rod Steiger, Don Stroud, Murray Hamilton | United States | Supernatural thriller, horror |
| Bloodline | Terence Young | Audrey Hepburn, Ben Gazzara, James Mason | United States | |
| The Butterfly Murders | Tsui Hark | Lau Siu-Ming, Eddy Ko | Hong Kong | |
| Les Chiens | Alain Jessua | Victor Lanoux, Nicole Calfan, Gérard Depardieu | France | |
| The China Syndrome | James Bridges | Jane Fonda, Jack Lemmon, Michael Douglas | United States | |
| Cuba | Richard Lester | Sean Connery, Brooke Adams, Héctor Elizondo | United States | Political thriller |
| Firepower | Michael Winner | Sophia Loren, James Coburn, O. J. Simpson | United Kingdom | |
| The First Great Train Robbery | Michael Crichton | Sean Connery, Donald Sutherland, Lesley-Anne Down | United Kingdom | |
| Flic ou voyou | Georges Lautner | Jean-Paul Belmondo, Marie Laforêt, Georges Géret | France | |
| I as in Icarus | Henri Verneuil | Yves Montand, Michel Etcheverry, Roger Planchon | France | |
| Last Embrace | Jonathan Demme | Roy Scheider, Janet Margolin, Christopher Walken | United States | |
| When a Stranger Calls | Fred Walton | Carol Kane, Charles Durning, Colleen Dewhurst | United States | |
| Winter Kills | William Richert | Jeff Bridges | United States | |
