= The Last Fashion Show =

- Italian: Sotto il vestito niente – L'ultima sfilata
- Directed by: Carlo Vanzina
- Written by: Carlo Vanzina; Enrico Vanzina; Franco Ferrini
- Starring: Francesco Montanari; Vanessa Hessler; Richard E. Grant
- Edited by: Raimondo Crociani
- Music by: Pino Donaggio
- Release date: 25 March 2011
- Running time: 93 minutes
- Country: Italy
- Language: Italian

The Last Fashion Show (Italian: Sotto il vestito niente – L'ultima sfilata, lit. 'Nothing underneath: the last fashion show') is a 2011 Italian giallo-thriller film directed by Carlo Vanzina. This film was the third in a gialli trilogy, which included Nothing Underneath (1985) and Too Beautiful to Die (1988).

== Cast ==
- Francesco Montanari as Inspector Vincenzo Malerba
- Vanessa Hessler as Brigitta "Britt" Olsen
- Richard E. Grant as Federico Marinoni
- Alexandra Burman as Alexandra Larsson
- Giselda Volodi as Daria Marinoni
- Virginie Marsan as Cris
- Paolo Seganti as Beppe Luini
- Claudine Wilde as Heidi
- Ernesto Mahieux as Giorgio Viganotti
- Mario Cordova as Max Liverani
- Alexander Doetsch as Bruce
- Elena Cotta as Pina
- Vincenzo Zampa as Mancuso
- Francesco Barilli as the Police Commissioner
- Stefano Molinari as Tanino Andò
