= Il Cuore nel Pozzo =

- Written by: Massimo De Rita; George Eastman; Salvatore Marcarelli; Alberto Negrin
- Directed by: Alberto Negrin
- Starring: Beppe Fiorello, Leo Gullotta, Antonia Liskova, Dragan Bjelogrlić, Jovana Milovanovic
- Theme music composer: Ennio Morricone
- Country of origin: Italy
- Original language: Italian

Production
- Producer: RAI
- Cinematography: Enrico Lucidi
- Editor: Antonio Siciliano

Original release
- Network: RAI
- Release: 6 February 2005

Il Cuore nel Pozzo (Italian for The heart in the pit; often reported in Croatian media with the translation Srce u jami and in Slovene Srce v breznu) is a TV movie, produced by state broadcaster RAI, that focuses on the escape of a group of children from Tito's partisans in the aftermath of World War II, as they start an ethnic cleansing of all Italians from Istria and the Julian March. The word "pit" in the movie's title refers to a foiba, indicating foibe massacres.

The movie was watched by 17 million people on its first broadcast in Italy. It was the first time that a major TV event was broadcast in Italy about the dramas of Foibe and Istrian Exodus.

== Plot ==
=== People Returning ===
April 1945. The German army is losing the war and Tito's Yugoslav partisans are rapidly gaining ground.

Giulia is a woman who earns a living by singing in a tavern in an unnamed village in what appears to be an ethnically Italian area of Istria. She had a child named Carlo six years earlier by a Slav named Novak, who has now become a partisan leader. It appears that Novak had raped Giulia, but Novak will later claim Giulia reported him to the police to get rid of him. The Italian police would rather believe an Italian woman than a Slavic man. The movie does not give a clear answer as to whose version of the story is true. Novak comes back to Giulia to claim his child, but she refuses to give him up. She attracts the attention of German soldiers and Novak must flee.

Francesco is an 8-year-old child, only son of physician Giorgio Bottini and music schoolteacher Marta. He lives with his parents in the same village as Giulia and Carlo. He meets Ettore, an Alpino who is tired of war and drops his rifle in disgust when Francesco mentions that he likes heroes of war. Ettore has come back to see his girlfriend Anja again, who is Slavic and works at Don Bruno's orphanage.

=== New Masters ===
Fearing for Carlo's safety, Giulia burns all his pictures so that Novak will not be able to recognize him, and gives Carlo to Don Bruno, the local priest, who takes him into his orphanage. Meanwhile, the Germans leave the village, which is taken shortly afterwards by the partisans. Novak enters a school, interrupting a music lesson of Francesco's mother, and orders all Italian books to be burnt. From this point, Novak will usually whistle the song the children were singing at various parts in the movie, making it his leitmotiv. At the same time, Francesco's father is threatened by Bostjan, Novak's henchman, and is forced to leave his clinic because he is Italian.

Don Bruno has to give Carlo to Francesco's family, because he thinks his orphanage is too dangerous for him. Francesco and Carlo become officially brothers, even if Francesco at first rejects him.

=== Escape ===
The partisans start rounding up civilians, taking away everybody including children. Eventually, Francesco's family is also captured along with Carlo. On the trucks they are loaded on, children are separated from their parents, a scene that hints at Nazi concentration camps of the same war. It turns out that Novak wants all the children of the village to check, one by one, which one will react to the sight of Marta, whom he has kidnapped and keeps in his camp. Just before Carlo's turn, Anja manages to infiltrate the camp and take away Carlo and Francesco, with Ettore's help.

Carlo and Francesco lose contact with their friends and return to an emptied home village. While waiting for help, German artillery starts pounding the village, and a shell makes Carlo deaf. Believing he cannot take care for him anymore, Francesco tries to bring Carlo back to Don Bruno's orphanage. On their way there, they see a convoy of partisans transporting Italian civilians, among them Francesco's parents. The civilians are gunned down by the partisans and thrown in a foiba, into which Francesco climbs down shortly after to find his parents dead, chained in iron wire. There is also a dying dog, which the partisans apparently threw down in order to keep the dead spirits from haunting them.

=== The search continues ===
With the help of Ettore, Francesco and Carlo finally manage to reach Don Bruno's orphanage. Shortly after, Novak and his partisans reach the orphanage. Don Bruno, Anja and Ettore hide all the children, hoping that Novak will believe they have left to Italy. Novak, however, understands the priest's bluff, and orders his men to pour gasoline around the orphanage. Don Bruno, then, is forced to admit there still are children, and calls them out loud—but only the Slavic ones, thinking they do not have anything to fear from Novak. Novak, again not falling for Don Bruno's bluff, orders to set fire to the gasoline; the children have to exit, and Anja is recognized by Bostjan and captured for being a quisling. Carlo, Francesco and other two children, however, manage to escape through a conduit.

Novak brings the children to his camp, again to show them to Giulia to understand whether one of them is his son. Don Bruno, when questioned, refuses to point out the child to Novak, because he considers him an assassin; Don Bruno is then kept prisoner by Novak.

=== Breaking out ===
The four children, having nowhere to go, reach Novak's camp and, whistling a code, find out that Don Bruno is in there. Francesco confronts Walter, a friend of his parents, who is still collaborating with the partisans; however, it turns out that he has been kept in the dark about Novak's ethnic cleansing. Walter offers himself to help contact Don Bruno, since he still has access to the partisans' base. He discovers that Anja and Giulia are also imprisoned in the same facility.

Exiting the complex, Walter meets Francesco and Ettore, who has in the meantime escaped pursue by partisans. Ettore, disguised with a partisan's uniform, starts pouring gasoline through the base, taking advantage of the fact that most soldiers are drunk. At the same time, in the base, Bostjan rapes a helpless Anja. While Novak is interrogating Don Bruno, Ettore ignites the gasoline, causing a series of chain explosions in the base's weapon caches.

While the partisans are busy trying to contain the damage, Walter liberates Don Bruno and tells him to go with the children to Gorizia by the mountains, to avoid partisan patrols. Don Bruno finds and liberates Anja, still shocked by Bostjan's rape, while Walter finds Giulia. Ettore, in the meantime, finds most of the Italian prisoners in the base and liberates them, but most of them are rapidly recaptured by the partisans.

Giulia is finally reunited with her son Carlo, and together with Don Bruno, Ettore, Anja, Francesco and other children they take refuge in an abandoned coastal battery. They escape from the partisans' pursue by using a rope to reach the sea, but, to buy time and seal the door behind them, Giulia leaves them and surrenders to Novak. Walter reaches the coastal battery and confronts Novak, accusing him of genocide. Novak responds that that land is theirs, not the Italians', and that the Italians still have to pay a large debt (implied, in lives).

The following morning, the children's group reaches a small boat. Anja, still struggling with the memories of her rape, does not want to leave, but Don Bruno convinces her to continue. Ettore has by now understood that something terrible has happened, even if it is not clear how much he knows.

=== Choice ===
Novak brings the remaining Italian prisoners to another foiba, and guns them down in front of Walter and Giulia, who are kept aside. He then brings Giulia to the brink of the foiba, and asks her to come back to him, telling her he still loves her. Giulia eventually smiles to him, and jumps into the foiba. Novak, shocked, orders his troops to chase the children's group, but one of his lieutenants, Drasko, protests that the Communist party's orders are to march on Trieste, not to hunt down children and priests; he eventually leaves Novak, along with a group of partisans.

The children's group is meanwhile proceeding through the mountains, avoiding partisan patrols. Trying to catch a hare with a slingshot, Francesco sets off a landmine, attracting Novak's attention. The children have to waste precious time as Ettore bears them out of the minefield, and are eventually cornered by Novak's forces. Novak, knowing they can hear him, threatens to kill Walter, still his prisoner, if his son is not brought to him. As Walter yells to them not to surrender because Novak is killing all the Italians, Novak shoots him.

=== Memories ===
As the children's group continue their escape, Ettore and Don Bruno visit the graves of Ettore's former comrades-in-arms. A group of veterans from campaigns in Greece and Albania, they were betrayed by a band of partisans who had asked them to join the resistance, and killed them with a machine gun as soon as they had handed over their arms. Ettore, after remembering them, takes back his guns from a cache he had left in a building close to his comrades' graves, and symbolically returns to be a soldier. He uses some dynamite to cut down a large tree in front of Novak's jeep, being dissuaded by Don Bruno from shooting at Novak with his rifle when he had the chance.

Meanwhile, the children and Anja are found by Bostjan and one of his partisans, but as Bostjan threatens to execute Anja, Ettore arrives, immobilizes Bostjan and kills the other partisan. As Bostjan tries to grab a weapon, Ettore kills him too. Anja, shocked by the memories of her rape by Bostjan that have come back, tries to commit suicide by jumping off a cliff, but Ettore succeeds in dissuading her.

=== Betrayal ===
The group reaches another village, which proves to be devoid of any people. There, they meet the Pavans, an upper-class family fleeing from Maresco. Their car (a luxury for the times) has stalled and they are stranded with their luggage. The Pavans try to protect their wealth and provisions, and do not allow their well-dressed children to talk to the others. Yet, they join the group as they do not have alternatives, trying to bring with them part of their cumbersome luggage for some time.

As they march on, Carlo is soon unable to walk due to a wound in his ankle, but he has finally regained his hearing. The group has to slow down, and Mr. Pavan grows nervous. Mr. Pavan learns that Carlo is the reason Novak is stalking them, and when his turn comes to carry him, he lags behind until he has a chance to bring the child to Novak, hoping he would let them go. Novak finally meets his son, but is ambushed by Ettore. Novak proposes to let the child decide where to go, but Carlo says he wants to go back to his mother. Ettore orders Novak and his men to drop their weapons, that are picked up by three Italian soldiers that Francesco had just stumbled upon. They leave Novak and his men unarmed and alive, and they proceed.

=== Last stand ===
However, Novak surrendered easily because he knew the road to Gorizia was blocked, and that he had time to regroup. As the children's group, together with the soldiers, is forced to move towards the coastline, they find an abandoned fortress. Ettore and the Italian soldiers decide to remain there to delay the advance of Novak's soldiers, who are chasing them, accepting the implication that they will likely not survive the fight.

At the abandoned fortress, Don Bruno quickly marries Ettore and Anja, since this could be their last time together. Mr. Pavan is forced to remain and fight, even if he tries to bribe his way out. When Novak and a dozen of his soldiers arrive, Mr. Pavan tries to surrender, only to be shot in the back by a partisan. Ettore and the other Italians continue to resist from their vantage position, and in the end only Novak and Ettore are left. Francesco, who has found a gun, runs back to the fortress to avenge his parents and kill Novak; Don Bruno runs after him, but arrives only in time to take the bullet from Novak's gun and save Francesco's life with his own; Ettore manages to grab a rifle and kills Novak.

Ettore and Francesco find Anja and the other children in a long line of refugees bound for a merchant ship that will bring them back to Italy.

== Controversy ==
Whether a neutral point of view being captured is dubious, as the concept of Italian fascism and its association with German Nazism and their crimes in the region are only vaguely mentioned in this war drama. Many (especially Slovenian politicians and some in the left wing of Italian politics) accused the movie of being tantamount to propaganda, presenting Italians as innocent victims and not as the former allies of Nazi Germany. Free from any obligations to real history, the Italian soldiers are pictured as those of the regular army, whereas at the time and in the region the only Italian formations could be that of the Fascist Italian Social Republic. The Italian soldiers were presented as merciful and altruistic, whereas Tito's partisans were reportedly presented as ruthless assassins and rapists, the main character among them being obsessed with taking back the son he had had from an Italian woman raped by him years before.

The director claims to have been completely free of political influences during the film's production. His defenders claim that, in the movie, previous fascist crimes are vaguely recalled but not dwelled upon in order to avoid appearing to promote the idea that one crime justifies another. They point out that both good and bad Italian characters are portrayed in the film, as well as both good and bad Yugoslavs.

The movie was sharply criticized in Italy, even by the Istrian and Dalmatian associations of exiles. It has been told that this delicate subject should not have been presented in a low quality movie, and should have been an historically correct production. It has been told that this movie was a terrible idea, because it was able to reopen sharp wounds between Italy and Slovenia, and in effect the movie was not welcomed in this Country. One year later, as a reaction, Slovenia introduced a new national holiday, for the "Unification of the Slovenian Littoral with Slovenia". This time the Italian political elite criticized the "bad taste" of Slovenian officials.

The movie was also used by Slovene and Croatian nationalistic movements, which claimed that the production was the "typical" Italian point of view about the problem. On the contrary, the movie collected only critics in Italy where it was defended just by its "political sponsor", the "Alleanza Nazionale" party, the real ideator of this politic propaganda action.

The movie received widespread criticism from the Italian left wing of politics and Slovenian public and politicians, as it portrays historical events in the way they have been described for many decades by Italian Fascists. It has been accused of being a work of propaganda, presenting helpless and innocent Italians as victims of the mindless rage of Slavic peoples, without more than just vaguely hinting to the vastly larger atrocities committed by Fascists in Yugoslavia during World War II (see also Italian war crimes) and the oppression of the Slavic population by the Italian Fascist rule of the region (1922–1943).

The movie, set in Istria (today in Croatia) had to be shot in Montenegro, because of opposition from Croatian authorities to a movie that portrayed them negatively. The portrayed scenery differs a lot from the real one.

Most of the controversy is based on the good vs. evil depiction made of the conflict between Italians and Slavs, with many Italians being pictured as positive and many Slavs as evil, with the exceptions of Fabrizio, an Italian, Anja (an Italian's Slavic girlfriend) and all of the children.

=== Supposed fascist rhetoric ===
In some parts of the movie, there are quotes that could echo themes dear to the extreme right of Italy.

- The movie is very clear about claiming that ethnic cleansing was a planned policy of Tito's partisans.
- Another supposed quote is when Francesco berates Ettore for having stopped fighting the war:

You coward! If you had not thrown away your rifle, if those like you had defended us, my parents would not be dead!

This resembles the rhetoric of the Italian Social Republic, where a major point of propaganda was the "honor" of not surrendering to the Allies, but continuing to fight.

- When Francesco questions Ettore's authority to lead the group, Don Bruno replies that:

[...] it's always better that decisions are taken by a soldier.

This could be interpreted as support for military dictatorships

- It is also claimed that Italian soldiers are pictured as pure, generous and altruistic, even though the only armed forces they could come from were the Italian Social Republics, such as the Decima Flottiglia MAS, historically infamous for their record of war crimes.

=== Behaviour of Slavs ===
The Yugoslav partisans are attributed a large number of negative traits: in order of appearance, they:

- shoot German soldiers who surrendered;
- one of them rapes a woman;
- one tries to take his son from his mother;
- burn the Italian flag;
- burn school books in Italian;
- threaten Italians in order to force them to give up their jobs;
- force Italians out of their village and separate parents from their children;
- betray their Italian allies (Italian partisans);
- murder the population of entire villages and throw the people into foibe after binding them in iron wire;
- throw dogs after them for a superstition;
- set an orphanage ablaze;
- are drunkards;
- murder civilians as a means of intimidating other Italians into submission;
- murder Italian partisans who should be their allies;
- betray Italian soldiers who were promised to enter the resistance, and massacre them;
- they do not think twice about firing on a child with a gun.

The slavs presented in a better light were Anja, girlfriend of an Italian soldier, and a few other minor characters.

=== Supposed antisemitism ===
One character, Fabrizio Pavan, is one of the antagonists. He could be interpreted as a stereotypical jew from antisemitic literature:

- he hides his food from the people (of which many are hungry children) who are saving him and his family;
- he is unable to perform practical tasks, such as repairing his car;
- he and his wife are very attached to their money and valuables;
- he tries to give a child to a Slav officer in order to buy himself freedom: sacrificing children was a common blood libel against Jews through the Middle Ages;
- he is unwilling to fight even if it is to save his family because of his cowardice;
- as soon as the fight begins he tries to surrender, only to be shot dead in the back;
- he also has a large nose, a beard, and a darker-than-average complexion.

His name, Pavan, is derived from the city of Padua. Many Jews in Italy have names derived from a city or village, which used to identify their ghetto in the Middle Ages. Yet, Pavan is very common in north-eastern Italy, among gentiles. However, the director of the movie, Alberto Negrin, is a jew.

== Inaccuracies ==
In addition to the political controversy, many factual mistakes can be found in the film.

=== Ettore's return ===
It is the spring of 1945. Ettore, shaved, wearing a clean uniform of the Alpini corps, still carrying his rifle, arrives at home. The armistice was in September 1943. Where has he been all this time?

=== Flag ===
When the Yugoslavian partisans enter Francesco's village, they burn the Italian monarchic flag and raise the Yugoslavian one. However, in 1945 Istria was not under the control of the Kingdom of Italy, but was directly ruled by Nazi Germany as part of the Operational Zone Adriatic Coast. The flag that would have flown over the village would then have been either the Nazi flag, or the flag of the Italian Social Republic, the Nazi puppet state headed by Benito Mussolini. In fact, the Italian monarchic flag was the flag of an enemy state. The choice of the more politically neutral monarchic flag seems a way to hide the fact that Italians were subordinate allies of Nazi Germany.

This flag was burnt in the movie.

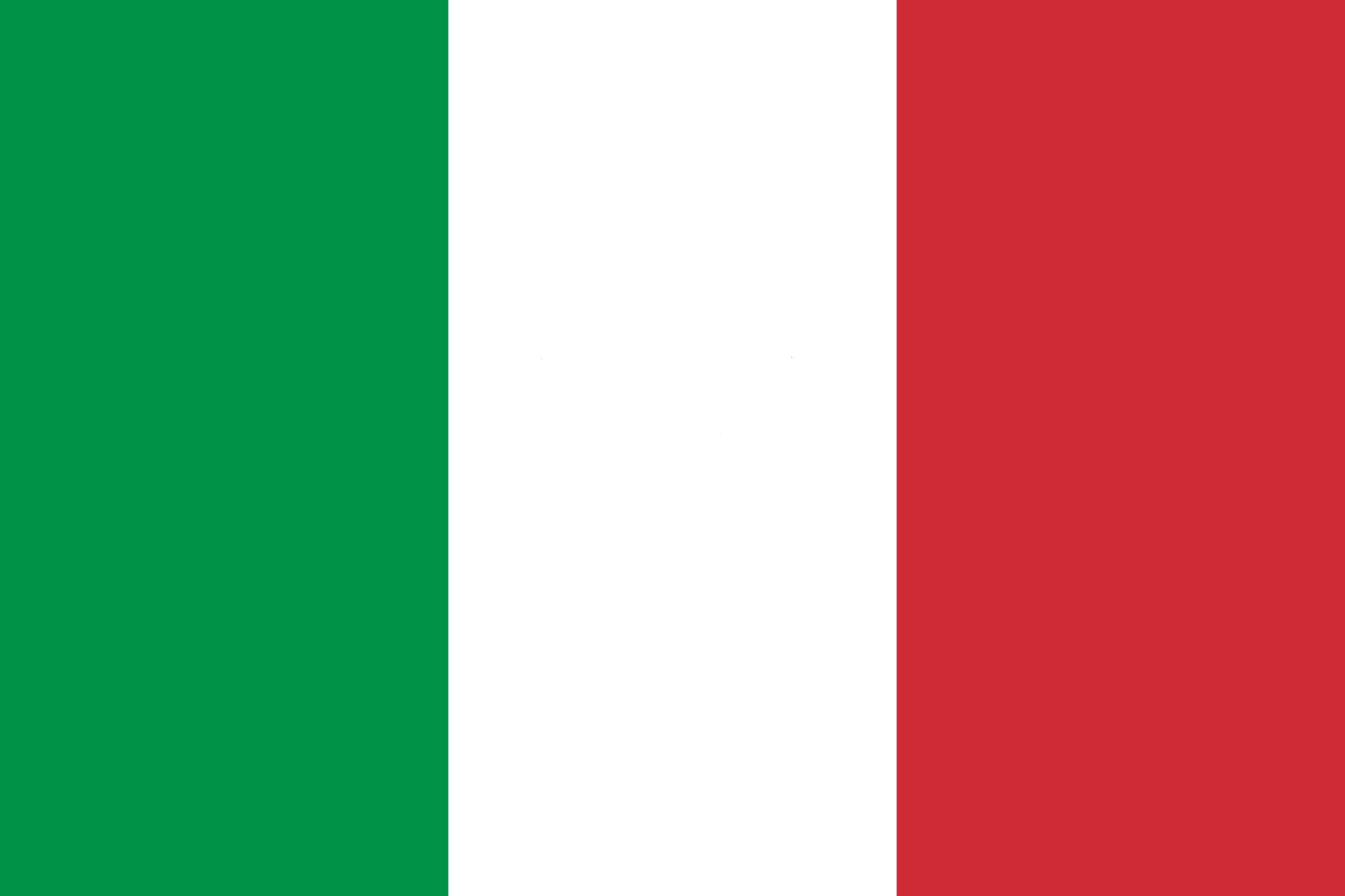
The flag of the Italian Social Republic.

The Nazi flag, which would have been flown in the village.

The flag the partisans raise

=== Shape of Foibe ===
When Francesco's parents are thrown in a foiba, Francesco descends to find them dead. However, given the shape foibe have, it is unlikely that an 8-year-old child (or even a man without a rope) could climb down in a foiba and back up unassisted.

=== Deportation ===
Some Italians from Istria have pointed out that Yugoslav partisans did not embark in mass deportations during the day, but targeted specific persons and kidnapped them during the night. There are no records of deportations of children or separation of parents and children either.

=== Language ===
All Slavs speak Italian when talking to each other; this could be a way to avoid ample use of subtitles, but Italian is used by Slavs also in those scenes where Italians are present too, and are therefore able to understand what they are saying (though Istrian Slavic population could understand Italian, most Italians had no particular knowledge of the Slavic languages). Some Slavic words can be heard in the background, but are not used in the main dialogues. Further, the Slavs refer to each other as "Slavs", rather than Croatian or Slovene. In fact, the movie completely ignores the fact that Croats and Slovenes were ethnically and linguistically distinct, and operates with a fictitious "Slavic" ethnicity throughout.
