= Ronald K. Goldman =

American film producer and tennis player (1943–2013)

Ron Goldman
- Full name: Ronald Kogod Goldman
- Country (sports): United States
- Born: November 2, 1943
- Died: November 13, 2013 (aged 70)

Grand Slam singles results
- US Open: 2R (1967)
Medal record
Maccabiah Games
Gold medal – first place	1969 Israel	Men's doubles

Ronald Kogod Goldman (November 2, 1943 — November 13, 2013) was an American film producer and tennis player.

Raised in the Washington D.C. area, Goldman was an alumnus of Sidwell Friends School in Bethesda, Maryland. He played collegiate tennis for Georgetown University and was twice Eastern Intercollegiate singles champion. A top ranked player in the Middle Atlantic, he made regular appearances at the U.S. national championships during the 1960s.

Goldman, a law graduate, had executive producer credits on several 1970s blaxploitation films. This includes the film Brotherhood of Death for which he was very much the brainchild and in a bid to save money was able to recruit members of the Washington Redskins football team to act in the film. He ran KB Theatres (co-founded by his grandfather Fred Kogod) in Washington DC for many years, before the business was sold to investors in the 1990s.

== Filmography ==
Year	Film	Credit
1972	Corky	Associate producer
1973	Sweet Jesus, Preacherman	Executive producer
1975	The Black Gestapo	Executive producer, writer
1976	Brotherhood of Death	Executive producer, writer
1978	The Hitter	Executive producer
