= The Secret of the Sahara =

Italian television miniseries

The Secret of the Sahara is a 1988 Italian television miniseries directed by Alberto Negrin. It originally aired with just four episodes of approximately 90 minutes each and, a version comprising seven approximately 50-minute episodes also exists. Produced by RAI, ZDF, Televisión Española and TF1, a condensed version was later shown in cinemas. It takes its main inspiration from the books of Emilio Salgari with some elements from Pierre Benoit's Atlantida.

== Plot ==
In 1925, an American archaeologist, Desmond Jordan moves to Africa, seeking the "Speaking Mountain". This brings him into the middle of the Sahara desert, where he meets some deserters from the French Foreign Legion. Jordan escapes with Orso (Bear) from a siege by Ryker, a lieutenant of the battalion, and moves towards the mountain.

Ryker and El Hallem, the head of the local tribes, pursue Jordan, who has gone blind while approaching the mountain. The lieutenant gives vent to his violence, murdering some locals and sparing only their queen, Anthea. Later she cures Jordan's blindness and, together with a redeemed El Hallem, helps the archeologist to defeat Ryker. Eventually, Jordan helps Anthea and Orso discover the secret of the mountain.

== Cast ==
- Michael York – Desmond Jordan
- James Farentino – Caliph of Timbuktu
- Ben Kingsley – Sholomon
- Andie MacDowell – Anthea
- David Soul – Lieutenant Riker
- Miguel Bosé – El Hallem
- Daniel Olbrychski – Hared
- Diego Abatantuono – Orso
- Delia Boccardo – Yasmine
- Ana Obregón – Tamameth
- Radost Bokel – Parizade
- William McNamara – Philip Jordan
- Itaco Nardulli – Kerim
- Mathilda May – Myriam
- Jean-Pierre Cassel – Major De Brosse

== Development ==
The story, which Massimo de Rita and Lucio Mandara collaborated on, was loosely based on the works of Emilio Salgari.

== Production ==
The filming was done mainly in Morocco.

The original soundtrack is by Ennio Morricone; the main theme is Saharan Dream performed by Amii Stewart.

== See also ==
- Sahara
