= Ione Skye =

British-American actress (born 1970)

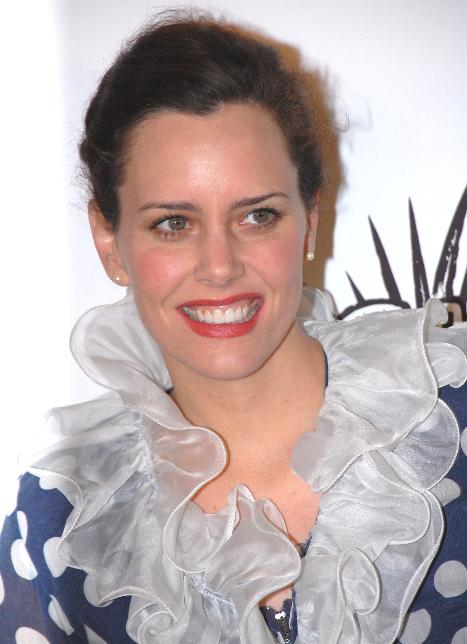
- Skye in 2007
- Born: Ione Skye Leitch; September 4, 1970 (age 56); Hampstead, London, England
- Occupation: Actress
- Years active: 1986–present
- Spouses: Adam Horovitz (m. 1992; div. 1999) Ben Lee (m. 2008)
- Partner(s): David Netto (1999–2003)
- Children: 2
- Father: Donovan
- Relatives: Donovan Leitch (brother)

Ione Skye Lee (née Leitch; born September 4, 1970) is a British-American actress. She made her film debut in River's Edge (1986) before finding mainstream exposure by starring in Cameron Crowe's Say Anything... (1989). She continued to appear in films throughout the 1990s, with notable parts in Gas Food Lodging (1992), Wayne's World (1992) and One Night Stand (1997). Her other credits include The Rachel Papers (1989), Guncrazy (1992), Four Rooms (1995), Fever Pitch (2005) and Zodiac (2007).

Skye's television work includes regular, recurring and guest roles on series such as Covington Cross (1992), The Twilight Zone (2002), Private Practice (2008), Arrested Development (2005–2019), Good Girls (2020), La Brea (2021) and Barons (2022). In addition to acting, Skye paints and has written several children's books. In 2006, VH1 ranked her 84th on its list of the "100 Greatest Teen Stars".

== Early life and education ==
Born in Hampstead, London, Skye is the daughter of folk singer-songwriter Donovan and model Enid Karl (née Stulberger). Her father is Scottish-born with some Irish ancestry and grew up in England. Her mother is an American who was raised in the Bronx, New York City, and is Jewish. Her second name comes from the Isle of Skye. She is the younger sister of Camp Freddy singer Donovan Leitch. Skye's parents were separated at the time of her birth, and she was raised by her mother, having little to no contact with her father.

Skye grew up primarily in Los Angeles and San Francisco, and also spent time in Connecticut. She attended Immaculate Heart High School and Hollywood High School in Los Angeles.

== Career ==
Skye made her film debut with a supporting role in River's Edge in 1986, followed by a role as the title character in The Rachel Papers (1989). She played Diane Court, a withdrawn high school valedictorian, in the 1989 film Say Anything..., the feature film debut of director Cameron Crowe; the film attained a cult following and lent Skye international recognition.

In 1992, she played Eleanor Grey on the short-lived television series Covington Cross, starred in Allison Anders's debut feature film Gas Food Lodging (which also featured Skye's brother Donovan Leitch), and had a supporting role in the Stephen La Rocque film Samantha. She subsequently had supporting roles as Elise in the comedy Wayne's World (1992) and the Mike Figgis-directed drama One Night Stand (1997).

She later appeared in the music video for the Harvey Danger song "Sad Sweetheart of the Rodeo." In 2007, Skye had a small, well-received part in the David Fincher film Zodiac.

In a 2010 interview with mondo-video.com, Skye said she had not paid perfect attention to her career arc over the years, saying she "never struck when the iron was hot" when it came to going after big Hollywood roles in her twenties.

In 2013, she appeared in a supporting part in the independent horror film Haunt, with Jacki Weaver. In 2016, Skye directed the music video for the Against Me! single "333." The same year, she appeared in the short film Kitty, directed by Chloë Sevigny.

== Other ventures ==
Skye is a painter, and sells her own works. She also wrote the children's book My Yiddish Vacation, published by Henry Holt and Company in May 2014. Skye has cited comic book artist Daniel Clowes as an inspiration for her painting and writing.

== Personal life ==
Beginning when she was 16, Skye had a relationship with Red Hot Chili Peppers singer Anthony Kiedis who was 24 at the time. Skye was supposed to appear as the cover model on the band's fourth album, Mother's Milk, which was released in August 1989, but the label felt she looked "a little young" (she was 18) so they used a different model. In January 2025, Skye posted the unused photo to her Instagram page saying that "it made me feel a little insecure to shoot it then not have it being used." In Skye's 2025 memoir Say Everything, Skye said that when she was 17 years old, Kiedis got her pregnant and paid for her abortion. "I was taking care of myself now, making a choice that felt good and important for my future. I would not have a baby at 17, with someone who didn't want to be a dad, wouldn't commit to me and had anger issues. Not to mention the heroin." Skye said she was inspired to tell her life story due to social media critics that questioned her romance with Kiedis. "These girls on TikTok were saying things like, 'How could my mom let me be with Anthony?' And I sort of clapped back. Not in an aggressive way, but I was like, 'Well, my mom was really upset that I was with a rockstar like Anthony Kiedis.' And I don't know, I kind of started feeling like I was able to tell my side of the story, and I had a lot to tell."

In 1992, Skye married rapper Adam "Ad-Rock" Horovitz of the Beastie Boys. They separated in 1995, got back together in 1996, and separated again later that year, divorcing in 2000.

Skye then had a relationship with furniture designer David Netto. They had a daughter, born in December 2001. Skye's Hollywood home and Netto's New York City apartment were featured in the February 2003 issue of Vogue. The two were engaged, but eventually separated.

In 2008, Skye became engaged to Australian musician Ben Lee. On December 29, 2008, Skye and Lee married in a Hindu wedding ceremony in India. They have a daughter, born on September 24, 2009.

In a 2015 interview, Skye discussed her struggle with addiction, including bouts with alcoholism and other drug use.

In her 2025 memoir Say Everything, Skye wrote that she discovered her bisexuality during her marriage to Horovitz. This led to her embarking on affairs with women, including model Jenny Shimizu and singer-songwriter Alice Temple. She has acknowledged relationships with former co-stars John Cusack and Matthew Perry, after working together on Say Anything and A Night in the Life of Jimmy Reardon, respectively.

Skye co-hosts a podcast called "Weirder Together". As of 2026, she lives in Australia.

== Filmography ==
=== Film ===
Year	Title	Role	Notes
1986	River's Edge	Clarissa	
1987	Stranded	Deirdre Clark	
1988	A Night in the Life of Jimmy Reardon	Denise Hunter	
1989	Say Anything...	Diane Court	
1989	The Rachel Papers	Rachel Noyce	
1990	Mindwalk	Kit Hoffman	
1990	The Color of Evening	Halys Smith	
1991	Samantha	Elaine	
1992	Gas Food Lodging	Trudi	
1992	Wayne's World	Elyse	
1992	Guncrazy	Joy Kincaid	
1994	Girls in Prison	Carol Madison	
1995	Four Rooms	Eva	Segment: "The Missing Ingredient"
1996	Cityscrapes: Los Angeles	Young Woman	
1996	Dream for an Insomniac	Frankie	
1996	The Size of Watermelons	Maggie	
1997	One Night Stand	Jenny	
1998	Went to Coney Island on a Mission from God... Be Back by Five	Gabby	
1999	Mascara	Rebecca	
1999	Jump	Stephanie	
1999	But I'm a Cheerleader	Kelly	Uncredited
2000	The Good Doctor	Nadia Wickham	Short film
2000	Men Make Women Crazy Theory	Unknown	Short film
2000	Moonglow	Unknown	
2000	Tower of the Firstborn	Diane Shannon	
2001	Southlander: Diary of a Desperate Musician	Miss Highrise	
2001	Free	Catherine	
2001	Angryman	Unknown	
2001	Chicken Night	Mama	Short film
2003	Spin, Shoot & Run	Jolynn	
2005	Fever Pitch	Molly	
2005	Bad Girls Behind Bars	Unknown	
2006	The Lather Effect	Zoey	
2007	Zodiac	Kathleen Johns	Uncredited
2009	My Father's Will	Diana Mancini	Also known as: The Homeless Billionaire, A Secret Promise
2013	Return to Babylon	Virginia Rappe	
2013	Haunt	Emily Asher	
2015	Monsters	Marie	Short film
2015	Ingrid	Helena	Short film
2016	Dear Eleanor	Charlotte	
2016	Kitty	Mother	Short film
2016	XOXO	Susan	
2020	Holy New York	Dalia	
2021	Habit	Sunny	
2024	Messy	Mona Fairchild	
2025	Anaconda	Malie McCallister	
2027	Skeletons	—N/a	Post-production

=== Television ===
Year	Title	Role	Notes
1987	Napoleon and Josephine: A Love Story	Pauline Bonaparte	Miniseries
1989	Nightmare Classics	Marie	Episode: "Carmilla"
1991	The General Motors Playwrights Theater	Joanna Dibble	Episode: "It's Called the Sugar Plum"
1992	Covington Cross	Eleanor Grey	13 episodes
1994	Girls in Prison	Carol Madison	TV movie
1997	The Perfect Mother	Kathryn M. Podaras	Television film
1998	Tower of the Firstborn	Diane Shannon	Television film
2000	The Fearing Mind	Irene	Episode: "Gentleman Caller"
2002	The Twilight Zone	Melina Kroner	Episode: "Night Route"
2003	The Dead Zone	Madeleine Wey	Episode: "Visions"
2004	The Clinic	Emma Matthews	Television film
2004	Back When We Were Grownups	Minerva 'Min' Foo	Television film
2005	Life As We Know It	Food Stand Woman	Episode: "Papa Wheelie"
2005–2019	Arrested Development	Mrs. Veal	3 episodes
2006	12 Hours to Live	Megan Saunders	Television film
2008	Private Practice	Monica Daniels	Episode: "Know When to Fold"
2010	The Santa Incident	Joanna	Television film
2014	Awkward.	Samantha Perry	Episode: "Welcome to Hell"
2018	UDrive Me	Tammi	
2018	Camping	Carleen	7 episodes
2020	Good Girls	Gayle Meyer	5 episodes
2021	Made for Love	Lottie	Episode: "User One"
2021	La Brea	Jessica Harris	Recurring role
2022	Barons	Marilyn Hunter	5 episodes
2023	Beef	Mysterious Woman	Episode: "The Drama of Original Choice"
