= L'isola (TV series) =

- Country of origin: Italy
- Original language: Italian

Original release
- Network: Rai 1
- Release: December 2, 2012 – January 21, 2013

L'isola is an Italian television series, directed by Alberto Negrin.

== See also ==
- List of Italian television series
