= Tom Schanley =

American actor (born 1961)

Thomas Lee Schanley (born May 5, 1961) is an American actor who has appeared in a number of television series and feature films.

His television credits include roles in S.W.A.T, NCIS: New Orleans, NCIS: LA, Graceland, Hawaii Five-O, Castle, Dexter, The Forgotten, Criminal Minds, CSI: Miami, CSI: NY, Dynasty, Baywatch, Melrose Place, ER, The Yellow Rose, Fame, T. J. Hooker, JAG, Murder, She Wrote, and Star Trek: Enterprise.

His feature film credits include (most recent first) Get the Gringo, A Better Life, Conspiracy Theory, Courage Under Fire, Fever Pitch and Nothing Underneath.

He portrayed Daniel W. Cloud of the Tennessee Mounted Volunteers in The Alamo: 13 Days to Glory (1987), a made-for-TV movie co-starring Alec Baldwin.
