= Voyage of Terror: The Achille Lauro Affair =

1990 television film directed by Alberto Negrin

- Genre: Drama
- Written by: Alberto Negrin; Sergio Donati
- Directed by: Alberto Negrin
- Starring: Burt Lancaster; Eva Marie Saint; Robert Culp; Joseph Nasser
- Theme music composer: Ennio Morricone
- Countries of origin: United States; Germany; Italy; France
- Original language: English

Production
- Producers: Mario Gallo; Enzo Giulioli
- Cinematography: Giuseppe Ruzzolini
- Editor: Richard E. Rabjohn
- Running time: 180 minutes
- Production companies: Tribune Entertainment Company; BETA; Taurus Group; Raidue; FilmAlpha Productions; TF1

Original release
- Release: April 29, 1990

Voyage of Terror: The Achille Lauro Affair is a 1990 TV miniseries based on the 1985 Achille Lauro hijacking and starring Burt Lancaster. The two part series aired on TV in 1990 and was filmed on the actual Achille Lauro cruise ship. It is the second adaption of the hijacking, after 1989's The Hijacking of the Achille Lauro.

== Plot ==
In October 1985, a group of Palestinian terrorists of the PLO embark on the Italian cruise ship Achille Lauro in Alexandria with the purpose of reaching Haifa and perform a suicide mission against Israel. However, when they're found out during the trip, they decide to hijack the ship and take all passengers hostage. Among them are Mr. Leon Klinghoffer (Burt Lancaster), a disabled Jewish-American, and his wife Marilyn Klinghoffer, who is hiding from her husband the fact she has skin cancer. Also taken hostage is Antonio, a ship staff member who bonds with Leon after looking after him at the request of Mrs. Klinghoffer. Prior to the hijacking Klinghoffer decided to stay on the ship and not go on tour to see the pyramids. Given the situation, the terrorists change their purposes, asking for the liberation of almost 50 other Palestinian terrorists detained in Israel, but both Egypt and Israel refuse to negotiate.

When even Syria refuses the entrance of the Achille Lauro in Tartus, the terrorists' leader Molqi (Joseph Nasser) kills Leon in retaliation and forces two sailors to throw his body overboard and the Syrians force the ship to leave.

To solve the situation, the PLO leader Yasser Arafat orders one of his men, Abu Abbas (who is the planner of the failed mission) to act as a negotiator for the Egyptian Government, and thanks to him the terrorists allow the ship and the hostages free in exchange for a safe return to Tunis.

However, immediately after Abbas and the terrorists have left for Tunis aboard an Egyptian passenger airliner, Klinghoffer's execution is discovered by the authorities. Molqi forced the Achille Lauro's captain to lie about the murder in front of the negotiators, since the condition for negotiation was his word that all of the passengers were alive. At that point President Reagan orders the U.S. Navy to intercept the airliner and force it to land at the Sicilian NATO base at Sigonella where the terrorists can be arrested by a Delta Force detachment commanded by General Davies.

When the plane successfully lands in Sigonella, the Italian Army, by order of the Prime Minister Bettino Craxi, refuses to hand over the terrorists to the United States military, since the base is located on Italian soil and the murder itself happened aboard an Italian ship.

For an entire night the tension rises, with the Italian Air Force security VAM and Carabinieri almost at the point of exchanging gunfire with the Delta operators, but in the end President Reagan has no choice but to respect Italian jurisdiction over the terrorists. Molqi and his three companions are then taken in custody by the Italians, while Abu Abbas is left free to leave the country, despite the American request to arrest him, since there is not enough proof of his involvement in the hijacking.

A year later a Television news bulletin announces the sentences that the hijackers received but that Abu Abbas is not in prison. Antonio starts to cry as he remembers Leon.

== Cast ==
Actor	Role
Burt Lancaster	Leon Klinghoffer
Eva Marie Saint	Marilyn Klinghoffer
Robert Culp	Gen. Davies
Renzo Montagnani	De Rosa
Rebecca Schaeffer	Cheryl
Brian Bloom	Antonio
Dominique Sanda	Margot
Bernard Fresson	Pierre
Joseph Nasser	Molqi
Yossi Ashdot	Assadi
Maurizio Benazzo	Michele
Jochen Horst	Helmut
Saïd Amadis	Abul

== Production ==
The film was dedicated in memory of Rebecca Schaeffer, who was murdered a short time after the end of filming.

== Release ==
The film was originally shown as a two-part mini-series and later released as a three-hour film.

== Home media ==
The film was made available for purchase on iTunes and YouTube after being released originally on VHS.
