= Spaghetti Nightmares =

Book by Luca M. Palmerini and Gaetano Mistretta

Spaghetti Nightmares is a reference book on Italian horror films by Luca M. Palmerini and Gaetano Mistretta. The book consists mainly of interviews (translated into English) with major genre icons. The book was published in 1996.

== List of persons interviewed ==
- Fabrizio De Angelis
- Claudio Argento
- Dario Argento
- Lamberto Bava
- Mario Caiano
- Stefania Casini
- Luigi Cozzi
- Armando Crispino
- Ruggero Deodato
- Mimsy Farmer
- Franco Ferrini
- Claudio Fragasso
- Lucio Fulci
- Umberto Lenzi
- Antonio Margheriti
- Aristide Massaccessi
- Luigi Montefiori (aka George Eastman)
- Daria Nicolodi
- Giannetto de Rossi
- Dardano Sacchetti
- Tom Savini
- Romano Scavolini
- Michele Soavi
- Terence Stamp
- David Warbeck
- Bernardino Zapponi

== Publication information ==
- Spaghetti Nightmares by Luca M. Palmerini and Gaetano Mistretta, Fantasma Books, Key West, Florida, 1996.
