= Tower of the Firstborn =

Tower of the Firstborn (A.K.A. "The Sands of Time")
- Directed by: Alberto Negrin
- Written by: Alberto Negrin
- Story by: Luigi Montefiori
- Based on: La torre della solitudine by Valerio Massimo Manfredi
- Produced by: Eleonora Andreatta; Jonas Bauer; Brendan Fitzgerald; Marco Gallo; Mario Gallo; Enzo Giulioli; Francesco Nardello; Steven North
- Starring: Ben Cross; Peter Weller; Ione Skye
- Cinematography: Daniele Nannuzzi
- Edited by: Bryan Oates
- Music by: Ennio Morricone
- Production companies: Taurus Film; Hallmark Entertainment
- Distributed by: Rai 1; France 2
- Release date: 1 May 2000 (Italy)
- Running time: 180 minutes
- Countries: Italy; France
- Language: English

Tower of the Firstborn (Italian: I Guardiani del Cielo) is a 2000 Italian-French adventure television film directed by Alberto Negrin and starring Ben Cross, Peter Weller, Bernard-Pierre Donnadieu, Marco Bonini, Ione Skye and Heino Ferch. It was based on the novel La torre della solitudine by Valerio Massimo Manfredi.

== Plot ==
Young and attractive archaeologist Diane Shannon intends to unravel the mystery linked to her father, who disappeared in Africa during the search for the "Tower of the First Born", a mysterious place that according to ancient legends would keep the secret of space and time, and would bestow knowledge and wisdom. Diane embarks on the journey ignoring the warnings of her friends and overcoming various dangers, clashing with a sheikh and his horde of savage desert marauders, and meeting the brave officer Léon in command of the foreign legion. Finally, together with Rashid, a mysterious prince of the desert and a friend of her missing father, Diane finds the mysterious place and her father.

== Cast ==
- Ben Cross as Michael Shannon / Zadick
- Peter Weller as John Shannon
- Marco Bonini as Rashid
- Guy Lankester as Neil Hogan
- Bernard-Pierre Donnadieu as Abdurasam
- Romina Mondello as Adriel
- Heino Ferch as Léon
- Ione Skye as Diane Shannon
- Gabriele Ferzetti as Father Jacob
- Antonella Lualdi as Mother Superior
- Rodolfo Corsato as Sassard
- Martin Semmelrogge as Geroq
- Gianni Garko as Commander
- Sal Borgese as Husuf
