= Nothing Underneath =

1985 film by Carlo Vanzina

- Italian theatrical poster
- Italian: Sotto il vestito niente
- Literally: Nothing under the dress
- Directed by: Carlo Vanzina
- Screenplay by: Carlo Vanzina; Enrico Vanzina; Franco Ferrini
- Story by: Enrico Vanzina
- Produced by: Achille Manzotti
- Starring: Tom Schanley; Renée Simonsen; Nicola Perring; Marie McDonald; Catherine Noyes; Paolo Tomei; Donald Pleasence
- Cinematography: Beppe Maccari
- Edited by: Raimondo Crociani
- Music by: Pino Donaggio
- Production company: Faso Film
- Distributed by: Titanus
- Release date: 7 November 1985
- Running time: 90 minutes
- Country: Italy

Nothing Underneath (Italian: Sotto il vestito niente, lit. 'Nothing Under the Dress') is a 1985 Italian giallo film directed by Carlo Vanzina and starring Renée Simonsen, Tom Schanley, and Donald Pleasence. The film follows a Yellowstone National Park ranger in Wyoming who travels to Milan to visit his sister, a fashion model, after having a vision of her being murdered; upon arriving in Italy, however, he finds her missing.

Nothing Underneath was originally going to be developed by director Michelangelo Antonioni. After Antonioni dropped out, Carlo Vanzina and his brother Enrico Vanzina were hired to work on the film, abandoning the novel the film was based on. Franco Ferrini was also hired and made further changes on Vanzina's story. The film was a great box office hit in Italy in 1985 leading to a sequel in the 1980s titled Too Beautiful to Die and a third film The Last Fashion Show (2011).

== Plot ==
Bob is a forest ranger working at Yellowstone National Park, while his twin sister Jessica has become a jet-setting fashion model based in Milan; he claims they have had a psychic bond since childhood. After receiving a copy of a magazine she did a shoot for with her contact information, he suddenly has a vision of her being murdered. Bob quickly heads to Milan and checks into the same hotel as his sister, but finds she has disappeared. Upon meeting local police commissioner Danesi, who is on the verge of retirement, he convinces a skeptical Danesi to look into the case.

Bob begins questioning other people who worked with Jessica, including Barbara, another high-profile model with the same agency Jessica worked with, who hints at a romantic attraction to him. However, several other models who knew Jessica are found murdered with a pair of scissors—the same weapon Bob envisioned his sister being killed with. One of the victims is found to have a cache of diamonds in her possession, which immediately directs suspicion to Giorgio Zanoni, a wealthy fashion designer known to host private parties with models. When the police question Giorgio, he reveals Jessica and the other murdered women were present with him the night of a private party where a game of Russian roulette accidentally killed another fashion model; he disposed of the body and bribed the others with diamonds in exchange for their silence.

Giorgio is arrested and jailed, and the police establish Jessica as the prime suspect in the killings of the other models, but Bob remains suspicious, particularly when he receives a telegram allegedly from Jessica asking him to return home. Bob traces the telegram back to the post office in Lugano where it was sent from, and upon heading there and asking for the original handwritten copy of the message, he spots inconsistencies in Jessica's signature. All the while, an Interpol agent in contact with Danesi has been tailing Bob out of suspicion. Bob returns to Milan, checks out of his hotel, then heads to a large studio apartment he expects to find a lead at. He finds the door locked with no one answering, but manages to climb through the apartment window, injuring his arm in the process. In the apartment he discovers that someone has forged Jessica's handwriting, and also finds Jessica's dead body pinned to a chair.

Bob telephones Danesi to warn him, but is forced to hide when he hears someone entering the apartment; it is revealed to be Barbara, who had attempted a lesbian relationship with Jessica, but murdered her after she rejected her advances. She also killed the other models, framed Giorgio, and sent the telegram to Bob in an attempt to throw him and the police off her trail. When Barbara discovers Bob hiding in the apartment, she attacks him with an electric drill, but Danesi and the Interpol agent arrive and unplug the drill before she can kill Bob. Seeing she has no way out, Barbara pushes the chair Jessica is pinned to out of the window and jumps after it to her death.

== Cast ==
- Renée Simonsen as Barbara
- Tom Schanley as Bob Crane
- Donald Pleasence as Inspector Danesi
- Cyrus Elias as Giorgio Zanoni
- Nicola Perring as Jessica Crane
- Maria McDonald as Margot Wilson
- Catherine Noyes as Carrie
- Anna Galiena as Diana
- Sonia Raule as Cristina

== Production ==
Nothing Underneath was initially set to be based on the novel by the same name by fashion journalist Paolo Pietroni under the alias of Marco Parma. The film was initially set up by producer Achille Manzotti to have Michelangelo Antonioni direct the film with the aim of repeating the success of Blowup (1966). Antonioni developed a seven-page scenario with Nicola Badalucco before abandoning the project. Carlo Vanzina and Enrico Vanzina came aboard production in February 1985 and disregarded the novel. The two felt the title and the premise of a thriller set in the fashion world had promise and decided to make the film in what they described as a "Brian de Palma-styled movie." Italian film critic and historian Roberto Curti noted the connection to De Palma, stating the film wore its influences on its sleeve with reprising the power tool murder scene from Body Double (1984) and the telekinetic link between siblings being a nod to Sisters (1972) and The Fury (1978).

Manzotti hired screenwriter Franco Ferrini specifically due to his work with director Dario Argento. Ferrini radically changed the script stating that he told the directors it was not scary enough. Among his changes was making the murderer more deranged and changing his weapon to being scissors instead of a gun.

== Release ==
Nothing Underneath was released in November 1985 and was distributed by Titanus. The film was a huge box office success in Italy grossing 1.692 billion Italian lire, beating other American productions at the box office such as The Goonies and Mad Max Beyond Thunderdome. Its popularity led to an in-name only sequel titled Too Beautiful to Die, and a few other Italian productions set in the fashion world in the 1980s. These include Obsession: A Taste of Fear and Fashion Crimes. The Vanzina brothers later made a third film in the series in 2011 titled The Last Fashion Show.

Nothing Underneath and its sequel Too Beautiful to Die were released on blu-ray by Vinegar Syndrome in October 2021.

== See also ==
- List of Italian films of 1985
