= The Bloodstained Shadow =

1978 film

- Directed by: Antonio Bido
- Screenplay by: Antonio Bido; Marisa Andalo; Domenico Malan
- Story by: Antonio Bido; Domenico Malan
- Cinematography: Mario Vulpiani
- Edited by: Amedeo Giomini
- Music by: Stelvio Cipriani
- Production company: P.A.C. Produzioni Atlas Consortziate S.r.l.
- Release date: 29 July 1978
- Running time: 104 minutes
- Country: Italy

The Bloodstained Shadow (Italian: Solamente nero, lit. 'Only Blackness') is a 1978 Italian giallo film co-written and directed by Antonio Bido, starring Lino Capolicchio and Stefania Casini. The film follows a professor who returns to his home in a coastline Italian village where a woman is strangled. The strangulation closely resembles the decades-old unsolved murder of a young girl in the village and is followed by the murders of various "sinners" throughout the town.

== Plot ==
An unseen figure strangles a young girl in a field and the murder goes unsolved. Years later, college professor Stefano returns home from Venice to visit his brother Don Paolo, a priest who has been ranting against the immoral people in his village, including a gambler, a pedophilic count, a fake medium, and an illegal abortionist. One night, the medium is strangled to death outside the church, and while Paolo witnesses the murder, he does not see the killer's face. It resembles the strangulation murder from years before, and at the scene, Stefano has incomplete flashbacks to his childhood that give him dizzy spells.

The medium's office is burglarized, with a disc and some notebooks stolen from her cupboard. Paolo receives threatening typewritten messages, which show pictures and documents pertaining to the unsolved murder of the girl. Stefano meets writer Sandra in town and starts a relationship with her. They go back to Venice to meet her mother-in-law, who uses a wheelchair, and in her apartment is a painting that closely resembles the unsolved murder of the young girl.

The members of the medium's circle begin to die: the count is impaled with one of his own rapiers; Sandra's mother-in-law is wheeled to her fireplace and burned alive as her painting is stolen; and the local doctor is thrown into a canal and rammed to death by the assailant's boat. Don Paolo continues to receive threatening messages, as well as a skinned goat's head in his pulpit, and one evening he is nearly crushed to death when his church's crucifix falls. Stefano believes the same killer strangled the young girl years ago. The abortionist, Elizabeth Nardi, hides an invalid, challenged son in her home, whom she primarily supports.

Sandra's home is broken into, a copy of the painting from her scrapbooks is stolen, and she narrowly avoids death when the killer escapes. Don Paolo is then stabbed and nearly murdered in the cemetery, but he and the killer run in separate directions. Stefano follows a hunch and breaks into Signora Nardi's house, where he finds her son's bedroom, the stolen notebook and disc, and a typewriter. The distinctive style of the keys suggests that she's been writing the threatening messages, and while Stefano then suspects she could be the killer, he finds her in the closet with her throat slashed.

In the church, Nardi's son tries to strangle Don Paolo, but he is subdued and taken away. Stefano goes through the notebook, realizing the missing pages were the same ones the murdered girl grasped in her hand as she died. Stefano rushes back to the church and confronts his brother. He deduces that Nardi strangled the medium to prevent her from reporting her illegal abortions, but when Paolo was blackmailed by her, he killed the coven members and targeted other witnesses to stop the blackmail. Paolo was the girl's murderer all those years ago when he was at seminary school, and Stefano's flashbacks reveal him to be the only witness when he was a boy. Paolo voices his remorse for all he has done, and after he hallucinates that all of his victims are in the church with him, he rushes to the bell tower, despite Stefano's pleas, and commits suicide by jumping out.

== Cast ==
- Lino Capolicchio as Stefano D'Arcangelo
- Stefania Casini as Sandra Sellani
- Craig Hill as Don Paolo
- Massimo Serato as Count Mariani
- Juliette Mayniel as Miss Elizabeth Nardi
- Laura Nucci as Sandra's stepmother

== Production ==
The film was developed under the title Dietro l'angolo il terrore (lit. 'Terror Behind the Corner'). Stelvio Cipriani's score is performed by Goblin.

== Release ==
The Bloodstained Shadow was released in 1978. The film grossesd 271 million Italian lire, which Italian film critic and historian Roberto Curti described as "underwhelming." The film was released as The Bloodstained Shadow on home video in Australia and the United Kingdom.

== Reception ==
From retrospective reviews, Adrian Luther-Smith reviewed the film in his book Blood & Black Lace calling it an improvement over Watch Me When I Kill (1977). Curti found the film less original than Watch Me When I Kill but that it had better than average acting and a good score from Stelvio Cipriani. The film was referred to as "a fine example of a competent giallo, as it contains all of the requisite elements".
