= Brotherhood of Death =

- Directed by: Richard F. Barker and Bill Berry
- Produced by: Ronald K. Goldman
- Starring: Roy Jefferson; Le Tari; Haskell Anderson
- Release date: 1976
- Running time: 78 minutes
- Country: United States
- Language: English
- Budget: $200,000-$250,000 USD

Brotherhood of Death is a low-budget 1976 action film in the blaxploitation genre, directed by Richard F. Barker and Bill Berry, and starring Roy Jefferson, Le Tari, and Haskell Anderson. The film featured appearances by several members, including Jefferson, of the Washington Redskins professional football team of the National Football League.

== Plot ==
In the mid-to-late 1960s, three young men leave their small Southern hometown to join the United States Army and fight in the Vietnam War. Upon their return home, they take up the cause of battling the racial injustices prevalent in the town. When the town's Ku Klux Klan members offer a murderously violent reaction to their efforts, the trio uses the lessons they learned in the Special Forces, fighting the Vietcong, to conduct an all-out war against the Klan.

== Cast ==
- Roy Jefferson as Raymond Moffat
- Le Tari as Ned Tiese
- Haskell Anderson as Junior Moffat
- Mike Thomas as Newton "Newt" Biggars
- Mick Hodge as "Ace"
- Ron David as Leroy Winniford
- Rick Ellis as Harold Turner
- Brian Donohue as Deputy Myrick
- Ed Heath as Preacher
- Mike Bass as Captain Quinn
- Bryan Clark as Sheriff
- Kandy Hooker as Louise Freeman
- Mark Robinson as Dope Dealer Soldier
- Vacountess E. Payne as Rose
- Jon Feather as Army Instructor
- Holly Hjretberg as Leroy's Girlfriend
- Barbara Cherry as Raymond's Girlfriend

== Production ==
The film was the brainchild of its executive producer, Ronald K. Goldman, a Washington, D.C. native and a veteran of blaxploitation film production. Guided by his previous experiences, Goldman devised a plan to make a film with a very low budget, to be produced entirely outside of the Hollywood establishment, and which he felt highly confident would still prove to be profitable.

Specifically, Goldman had deemed the quality of the acting in blaxploitation films to be unimpressive, even in those films which had been financially successful. Reasoning that even untrained actors could provide performances of similar quality, Goldman leveraged the fact that he knew some members of the Washington Redskins football team and convinced them to appear in his film. He thus gained some marquee value from their sports celebrity status without having to pay the higher salaries that would have been required to employ experienced actors who would have generated a similar level of public interest.

Knights of the Ku Klux Klan (KKKK) billboard shown in Brotherhood of Death

Goldman saved additional money by hiring a first-time director and having nearly the entire film shot in Montgomery County, near Washington. One exception was an actual Ku Klux Klan recruitment highway billboard which was featured in the film, suggesting the level of the Klan's support and influence in the town depicted in the movie. Such billboards were a relatively common sight in the South during the mid-1960s time period that served as the film's setting. However, by the time of filming in 1976, the majority of them had been removed. The billboard that was ultimately used in the movie (shown right) was filmed at its location on U.S. Route 70 at the city limits of Smithfield, North Carolina. The sign was maintained there until the late 1970s, making Smithfield one of the last towns that the filmmakers could have found which continued to have such a sign displayed.

The bar sequences were filmed at the Disabled American Veterans, Chapter #7 club house, located on Maryland Route 197 in Bowie, Maryland under the leadership of John "Jack" Federici, who appeared in the film with several other disabled war veterans.

== Reception ==
According to Goldman, his financial strategy of pursuing a very low budget succeeded in ensuring the profitability of Brotherhood of Death. Goldman reported that the film brought in approximately $1 million USD, after having been made at a cost of between $200,000 and $250,000. Nonetheless, the film was widely panned by critics, did not find a lasting place in the public consciousness, and became one of the essentially forgotten entries of the blaxploitation film era.

Among those who liked the film, however, was director Quentin Tarantino, and he would eventually give the film a renewed exposure. Tarantino has twice screened Brotherhood of Death at the Quentin Tarantino Film Festival, and the news of his advocacy of the film was among the factors that led to the decision to release it on DVD in 2005. Since then, it has aired numerous times on the Independent Film Channel (IFC) cable television network, with IFC's Matt Singer having expressed admiration for the movie.

== Misidentification of the cast ==
The liner notes in the DVD release of Brotherhood of Death incorrectly ascribe Tari's and Anderson's leading roles to Redskins players Mike Bass and Mike Thomas. Although Bass and Thomas were among the football players who appeared in the film, Jefferson was the only one of the three leading actors who was a Redskins player. Some reviewers, such as online film critic Harry Knowles, have similarly misidentified Redskins receiver Larry Jones as one of the three leading actors. In keeping with Goldman's plan to utilize the players' marquee value as famed sports stars, the film's one-sheet and other promotional materials featured the football players — even those with smaller roles — over unknown leading actors Tari and Anderson, perhaps contributing to the later misconceptions. In more recent years, Brotherhood of Death was made available as a dual release DVD with Fred Williamson's One Down, Two to Go. Due to misleading crediting of the films on this release, the lead role in Brotherhood of Death was attributed to Fred Williamson, who in fact had no involvement in the feature.
