= Red Rings of Fear =

- Italian theatrical release poster
- Directed by: Alberto Negrin
- Screenplay by: Marcello Coscia; Massimo Dallamano; Franco Ferrini; Stefano Ubezio; Peter Berling; Alberto Negrín
- Story by: Miguel De Echarri
- Produced by: Antonio Tagliaferri
- Starring: Fabio Testi; Ivan Desny; Christine Kaufmann; Brigitte Wagner
- Cinematography: Carlo Carlini
- Edited by: Paolo Boccio
- Music by: Riz Ortolani
- Production companies: Daimo Cinematografica; CIPI Cinematografica; CCC Filmkunst GmbH
- Distributed by: Variety Distribution
- Release date: 19 August 1978 (Italy)
- Countries: Italy; Spain; West Germany

Red Rings of Fear (Italian: Enigma rosso, German: Orgie des Todes, Spanish: Tráfico de menores) is a 1978 giallo film directed by Alberto Negrin.

== Plot ==
A detective investigates the killing of a teenage girl and turns his suspicions on three girlfriends of the victim, who dub themselves "The Inseparables."

== Production ==
Red Rings of Fear is the third entry in a loosely linked series of film called the Schoolgirls in Peril trilogy, a series of films based on the sexual exploits of young girls and their reaction to the adults. By 1974, audiences began to grow tired of the giallo genre and began having interest in other European genres such as the poliziotteschi, urban cop thrillers that were influenced by American films such as Dirty Harry and The French Connection. Dallamano's second film in the Schoolgirls in Peril trilogy was What Have They Done to Your Daughters?, a film with similar themes to the first film What Have You Done to Solange?. Red Rings of Fear has Dallamano credited as a screenwriter on the film, and was intended to direct the film, but he died before the film began production.

== Cast ==
- Fabio Testi as Inspector Di Salvo
- Christine Kaufmann as Christina
- Ivan Desny as Inspector Roccaglio
- Jack Taylor as Parravicino
- Fausta Avelli as Emilia
- Helga Liné as Miss Russo

== Release ==
Red Rings of Fear was released in Italy on 19 August 1978.

== Reception ==
In a contemporary review, Paul Taylor (Monthly Film Bulletin) gave the film a negative review, calling it "a wholly inane and incoherent thriller, which scarcely seems to have benefited form the attentions of no less than six credited screenwriters." and that it featured a "bored-looking Fabio Testi, when not shooting gratuitous fill-ins (schoolgirls in the showers; an abortion sequence) from silly angles, Negrin peppers the proceedings with would-be enigmatic close-ups of car radiator grilles, a madonna statue and a watching eye, plus titillating flashbacks to the fatal party"

== Works cited ==
- Mackenzie, Michael (2015). Innocence Lost (Blu ray). Arrow Films. FCD1198.
