= Sonno Profondo =

- Film poster
- Directed by: Luciano Onetti
- Written by: Luciano Onetti
- Produced by: Nicolás Onetti
- Starring: Luciano Onetti; Daiana García; Silvia Duhalde
- Cinematography: Luciano Onetti
- Edited by: Luciano Onetti
- Music by: Luciano Onetti
- Release date: October 11, 2013 (Sitges)
- Running time: 67 minutes
- Country: Argentina
- Language: Italian

Sonno Profondo (English: Deep Sleep) is a 2013 Italian giallo film, running 67 minutes in length. It was directed and written by Luciano Onetti and produced by Nicolás Onetti.

== Synopsis ==
After murdering a woman, a killer that is traumatized from his childhood memories gets a mysterious envelope slipped under his door. The hunter becomes the prey when he finds out that the envelope contains photos that show him killing the young woman.

== Production ==
In spite of being shot in Argentina, the film's screenplay is written in Italian. The movie is set in the 1970s. The film had excellent reviews after its World Premiere at Sitges 2013.

The soundtrack was composed by Luciano Onetti in the style of Ennio Morricone. Sonno Profondo won the Tabloid Witch Awards for "Best Music Soundtrack".

== Reception ==
Craig Alexander of Fangoria gave the film a positive review, calling the film "nothing short of audacious, if occasionally a bit too frenetic. Recommended for horror fans who like their stuff weird and challenging."

=== Accolades ===
- Best Film, Hemoglozine 2013, Spain.
- Best Music Soundtrack, Tabloid Witch Awards 2013, United States.
- Special Mention, Buenos Aires Rojo Sangre 2013, Argentina.
- SITGES 2013 International Film Festival, Spain.
- Festival Internacional de Cine de Mar del Plata 2013, Argentina.
- Móbido Fest 2013, México.
- Puerto Rico Horror Film Festival 2013, Puerto Rico.
- Horror-On-Sea 2014, United Kingdom.
- HorrorQuest 2013, United States.
