= Haskell V. Anderson III =

American actor (born 1943)

Haskell Vaughn Anderson III (born November 26, 1943) is an American film, television and theater actor. He is most known for his role in the 1989 martial arts film Kickboxer. He starred in the 1976 film Brotherhood of Death and appeared in the 2007 independent feature Boy and Dog.

== Theater ==
His stage performances include Tracers in New England and Australia. In Lions, a play by Vince Melocchi about the Detroit Lions, Anderson played the role of Bisquit. He is a recipient of the NAACP Image Theatre Award for Best Supporting Actor for his performance in the original play Rounds by Sean Michael Rice. In 2010, he appeared as Frank Malgado in the world premier of Vince Melocchi's Julia. He is a company member of the Pacific Resident Theatre in Los Angeles.

== Film ==
In the early 1980s, he was involved with the L.A. Rebellion black film movement at UCLA, appearing in shorts by S. Torriano Berry (Rich, 1982) and Monona Wali (Grey Area, 1982).

Along with screenwriter Mugs Cahill, Anderson developed the story for 40 Days Road and is attached to star in the film project which is currently seeking financing.

== Other work ==
As of 2014, Anderson was a guest artist at Professional Arts Lab, at the University of California, Santa Barbara.

In 2010, Anderson was selected for a two-year term to serve as president of Catholics in Media, based in Los Angeles.

== Personal life ==
Anderson is a major proponent of blood platelet donation, which he has participated in personally for years.
