= The Case of the Bloody Iris =

- Italian film poster
- Directed by: Anthony Ascott
- Screenplay by: Ernesto Gastaldi
- Produced by: Luciano Martino
- Starring: Edwige Fenech; George Hilton; Paola Quattrini; Giampiero Albertini; George Rigaud; Franco Agostini; Ben Carra; Carla Brait; Annabella Incontrera
- Cinematography: Stelvio Massi
- Edited by: Eugenio Alabiso
- Music by: Bruno Nicolai
- Production companies: Galassia Film; Lea Film
- Distributed by: Interfilm
- Release date: 1972
- Running time: 94 minutes
- Country: Italy
- Language: Italian

The Case of the Bloody Iris (Italian: Perché quelle strane gocce di sangue sul corpo di Jennifer?, lit. 'Why those strange drops of blood on Jennifer's body?', originally released in the UK as Erotic Blue) is a 1972 Italian giallo film directed by Giuliano Carnimeo, identified in the credits as Anthony Ascott. The film, scripted by screenwriter Ernesto Gastaldi, stars Edwige Fenech and George Hilton.

== Plot ==
A prostitute, Luna, is buzzed into the high-rise apartment building of a regular client. She is stabbed to death in the elevator by a masked killer who vanishes before it reaches the top floor, where the tenants (violinist Professor Issacs, widow Mrs. Moss, and casino stripper Mizar Harrington) discover the body. The police are called as Mizar leaves for her shift at the casino.

Meanwhile, the building's architect Andrea Antinori (George Hilton) hires a photographer to find models for advertisements. He becomes enthralled with Jennifer Langsbury (Edwige Fenech), who is posing with her friend Marilyn Ricci. On her way out of the studio, Jennifer is accosted by Adam, the leader of a sex cult named “Iris” she was a part of before escaping into modeling. He sternly warns her if she doesn't come back to him, there will be consequences.

Mizar returns to her apartment, where she is drowned in the bathtub by the killer. In the morning, police commissioners Enci and Renzi investigate the murder. Mrs. Moss is interviewed as a witness. At the crime scene, a love letter is found.

To entice them to star in his advertisements, Andrea sublets Mizar's now-vacant apartment to Jennifer and Marilyn. He joins them for dinner and is disturbed by the sight of Jennifer cutting her finger, revealing his fear of blood. On his way out of the building afterwards, Andrea is confronted by Adam, who tells him Jennifer can't belong to anyone else.

Close to dawn, the killer enters the apartment by the balcony and wraps their hands around Jennifer's throat, but flees when she awakens and screams. Marilyn thinks she dreamed the encounter. The next morning at the drugstore, they meet their neighbor Sheila Issacs, who lives with the Professor, her father.

Andrea is interviewed by the police as a potential suspect. Enci orders Renzi to keep watch on him. Jennifer finds an iris near her door and enters the apartment, where Adam attacks her. She escapes and calls Andrea. The two go out to eat and take a walk in a park, being followed by Renzi.

Jennifer returns to the apartment that night to find the killer waiting. She hits them with a lamp and runs to Sheila's apartment for help. When they go back together, the killer is gone. Marilyn arrives and finds the blood-soaked iris on the floor before opening a closet and discovering Adam, stabbed to death. Jennifer tells Enci and Renzi about the cult and they assure her she will not be charged in Adam's death. Later, she thinks she hears Mrs. Moss talking to a man in the apartment next door. A handwriting sample test comes back on Mizar's love letter, revealing it to have been sent by Sheila. Enci interviews her, and she comes out as a lesbian (she was also the one who hired Luna at the beginning of the film).

Andrea invites Jennifer to his house, where he proclaims his love for her. The next day, Marilyn is stabbed in a crowd outside the high-rise by the killer. She manages to grab Andrea, who was waiting for a taxi nearby, before collapsing and dying. Frightened by the blood, he flees the scene and is chased by Renzi, but evades capture. Despite Enci's suspicions, Jennifer is sure he is innocent of the murders.

She returns to the building and hears Mrs. Moss talking with the male voice again. She breaks into the neighboring apartment and is attacked by Mrs. Moss' son David, who is deformed and lives in a hidden room. Mrs. Moss arrives and kicks her out. Jennifer calls the police, but Mrs. Moss has hidden David when they arrive and claims she lives alone.

Jennifer receives a call from Andrea, asking to meet him in a junkyard outside of town. She goes there, but Andrea is scared off by Renzi, who followed her. Jennifer goes back to the apartment, runs into Sheila, and the two board the elevator together. However, it goes down to the basement by itself. They exit and explore the room before Sheila is burned to death by a jet of hot steam from a boiler sabotaged by the killer.

Jennifer hides as someone stalks her through the basement. Andrea reveals himself and claims his innocence, but she doesn't believe his words. The police arrive and chase him, but he escapes. Meanwhile, Mrs. Moss finds David missing from his room. Professor Issacs is distraught over his daughter's death and plays the violin in mourning.

Jennifer decides to leave the building once and for all. While packing her bags, she is attacked by the killer again. She goes to Professor Issacs' apartment for help, only to find David's corpse in a chair. The killer unlocks the door and takes off his mask, revealing himself as the Professor. Unable to cope with Sheila's lesbianism, he blamed her sexuality on the other women in the building and murdered them for revenge, killing Adam for interfering with his plan. He modeled his disguise after David's, who wore a similar one while acting as a peeping tom on the other tenants, and plans to frame him for the crimes. He accidentally killed his daughter with the steam, mistaking her in the dark basement for Jennifer.

The Professor chloroforms her and throws David's body down the open stairwell before preparing to do the same to her. Andrea exits the elevator and attacks, managing to overpower the Professor and throw him over the railing to his death. Andrea and Jennifer share a passionate hug, relieved the ordeal is over.

== Cast ==
- Edwige Fenech as Jennifer Langsbury
- George Hilton as Andrea Antinori
- Paola Quattrini as Marilyn Ricci
- Annabella Incontrera as Sheila Issacs
- George Rigaud as Professor Isaacs
- Giampiero Albertini as Commissioner Enci
- Franco Agostini as Assistant Commissioner Renzi
- Oreste Lionello as Arthur, the photographer
- Ben Carrá as Adam
- Carla Brait as Mizar Harrington
- Luciano Pigozzi as Fanelli, the casino owner (uncredited)
- Maria Tedeschi as Mrs. Moss (uncredited)
- Evi Farinelli as Luna (uncredited)

== Production ==
The script, by veteran giallo screenwriter Ernesto Gastaldi, was originally titled 'Uno strano fiore con cinque gocce di sangue' (in English, 'A Strange Flower with Five Drops of Blood'), and echoes elements of an earlier Gastaldi giallo, The Strange Vice of Mrs. Wardh (1971), where Edwige Fenech's character, also a fashion model, is persecuted by her domineering ex-husband who has an interest in sexual perversion.

The Case of the Bloody Iris was filmed in Rome and Genoa, with Luciano Martino as producer, and was the first and only giallo film directed by Giuliano Carnimeo, who was better known for directing Spaghetti Westerns and commedie sexy all'italiana films. The film reunited actors Edwige Fenech and George Hilton in their third film collaboration, with the pair previously starring in the gialli films The Strange Vice of Mrs. Wardh and All The Colors of the Dark (1972), both directed by Sergio Martino.

== Themes ==
The Case of the Bloody Iris is considered to be a classic of the giallo genre, alongside films including Mario Bava's The Girl Who Knew Too Much (1962) and Blood and Black Lace (1964), Dario Argento's The Bird with the Crystal Plumage (1970), The Cat O' Nine Tails (1971) and Deep Red (1975), Massimo Dallamano's What Have You Done to Solange? (1972), Luciano Ercoli's Death Walks at Midnight (1972) and several others.

Gastaldi’s screenplay features a number of motifs common to the genre, with the plot following amateur detectives Andrea and Jennifer as they attempt to make sense of a slew of murders – presented as highly stylish set pieces throughout the film – committed by a mystery killer disguised in a wide-brimmed hat, gloves, overcoat and mask who brandishes a shiny blade that he uses to kill his victims. The film incorporates other giallo tropes, including the use of a tape recorder as a prop for misdirection, the presence of quasi-comic, flamboyant characters, represented by Oreste Lionello's turn as fashion photographer Arthur, and flashbacks to childhood trauma, seen in Andrea's reaction to the sight of blood.

Thematically, critics have noted the film also explores fears of modernity and the subsequent "breakdown of community" and "alienation of modern urban existence" common to many giallo films of the era. The urban city setting is depicted as crowded and densely populated, with film historian Roberto Curti noting that director Carnimeo "convincingly employed the overpopulated Genoa downtown, setting the story in a beehive-like condominium". The main characters largely all reside in a Brutalist high-rise apartment building, which is also where the majority of the murders and attempted murders take place. Film author Mikel J. Koven writes:

"Part of the isolation of living in large apartment blocks is that one is isolated – cut off, as it were – from one's neighbours. The Case of the Bloody Iris exemplifies this isolation. Three residents on the same floor discover the first murdered victim in one of the apartment building's elevators... throughout the film, much is made of the fact that in this apartment building, no one knows who their neighbours are."

The film also explores challenges to traditional values posed by changing societal norms associated with modernity, reflected by characters' reactions to homosexuality and lesbianism – represented by photographer Arthur, and the killer's obsession with avenging his daughter's lesbianism – as well as consideration of multiculturalism and sexual liberation – seen in the "strong, liberated sexuality" of Carla Brait's character, the Amazon-like nightclub performer Mizar, who challenges men to battle on stage in a strip club, and the return of Jennifer's cult leader ex-husband, Adam.

== Home media ==
The Case of the Bloody Iris was re-released in 4K UHD and Blu-ray, transferred from the original negatives by Celluloid Dreams in June 2024, with extra features including a commentary track by film critic Guido Henkel and interviews with director Giuliano Carnimeo, writer Ernesto Gastaldi and actors George Hilton and Paola Quattrini.

== Reception ==
Writing in Slant Magazine, Budd Wilkins described the film as "a quintessential, stylishly assembled giallo", rating it four out of five stars. DVD Talk called the film "never boring" and "a competent thriller which offers enough violence and sex to satisfy the most ardent giallo fan".

In 2015, a novelization of the film by Michael R. Hudson was published in the United States by Raven Head Press as part of a series of adaptations of several of Gastaldi's scripts, including The Horrible Dr. Hichcock and My Name is Nobody.

== See also ==
- List of Italian films of 1972
- List of giallo films
