= Le Tari =

American actor

- Tari in Diff'rent Strokes
- Born: April 21, 1946; Cleveland, Ohio, U.S.
- Died: April 4, 1987 (aged 40); Los Angeles County, California, U.S.
- Occupation: Actor
- Years active: 1976–1987

Le Tari (born Samuel Leslie Watkins; April 21, 1946 – April 4, 1987) was an American actor who appeared in movies and television.

== Background ==
Distinctive for his imposing physical stature, broad mustache and lantern jaw, Tari landed a starring role in the 1976 blaxploitation film Brotherhood of Death. In the late 1970s, he would make guest appearances on such television programs as The Jeffersons, Starsky & Hutch and Happy Days, as well as appear in such feature films as Fast Break and The Onion Field.

Tari's widest exposure would come in the early 1980s, with a recurring role on the television sitcom Diff'rent Strokes. On that show, Tari played Ted Ramsey, the adoptive father of Arnold Jackson's best friend, Dudley (Shavar Ross). After Diff'rent Strokes, Tari went on to further television guest appearances, and near the end of his life, he returned to film work, appearing in the 1987 films Hollywood Shuffle and Amazon Women on the Moon. He also appeared in What's Happening Now!! as Dr. Blood, a reformed gang banger trying to help the youth center, in the episode "That Old Gang Of Mine".

Tari died of a heart attack on April 4, 1987.
