= Watch Me When I Kill =

- Theatrical film poster
- Directed by: Antonio Bido
- Written by: Antonio Bido; Roberto Natale; Vittorio Schiraldi; Aldo Serio
- Produced by: Gabriella Nardi; Herman Cohen Productions
- Starring: Corrado Pani; Paola Tedesco
- Cinematography: Mario Vulpiani
- Edited by: Maurizio Tedesco
- Music by: Trans Europa Express
- Release date: 6 August 1977
- Running time: 110 minutes

Watch Me When I Kill (Italian: Il gatto dagli occhi di giada/ The Cat with the Jade Eyes), also known as The Cat's Victims in the UK, is a 1977 Italian giallo film co-written and directed by Antonio Bido. The American prints have an additional short credit sequence that was filmed in the USA, slightly different from the other versions. It has also been released as Terror in the Lagoon (France) and The Vote of Death (Germany). Herman Cohen (of Konga fame) co-produced the film.

== Plot ==
A young dancer named Mara calls at a pharmacy moments after the murder of the pharmacist inside, but the killer prevents her access by holding the door shut. Fearing she knows too much, the perpetrator soon makes an attempt on her life, causing her to move in with her boyfriend, Lukas, for protection. Several other people begin turning up murdered, one having her head forced into an oven and another strangled in a bathtub. An escaped murderer named Pasquale Ferrante seems the most likely suspect to Lukas, since most of the victims were jurors at Ferrante's murder trial. Lukas later learns the trail of clues leads back to World War II and events involving a group of Nazi collaborators.

== Cast ==
- Corrado Pani as Lukas
- Paola Tedesco as Mara
- Franco Citti as Pasquale Ferrante
- Fernando Cerulli as Giovanni Bozzi
- Giuseppe Addobbati as The Judge
- Paolo Malco as Carlo
- Gianfranco Bullo
- Jill Pratt
- Bianca Toccafondi
- Giovanni Vanini

== See also ==
- List of Italian films of 1977
