= Franco Ferrini =

Italian screenwriter

- Born: 5 January 1944 (age 81); La Spezia, Liguria, Italy
- Occupation: Screenwriter
- Known for: Collaborations with Dario Argento

Franco Ferrini (born 5 January 1944) is an Italian screenwriter.

Ferrini was initially a film critic. Ferrini had worked on projects such as Elio Petri's unmade spy film Chi illumine la grande notte and Sergio Leone's Once Upon a Time in America (1984). While Ferrini is credited as one of the five screenwriters on the Leone's film, intensive revisions of the drafts for the film were done during the later half of the 1970s. Leone said that Stuart Kaminsky and Leonardo Benvenuti were the principal contributors who "miraculously concluded" the screenplay.

Ferrini has made several films collaborating with Dario Argento, with the first being Phenomena (1985). He was one of the interviewees represented in the book Spaghetti Nightmares.

== Select filmography ==
| Title | Year | Credited as | | | Notes | Ref(s) |
| Title | Year | Screenwriter | Screen story writer | Other | Notes | Ref(s) |
|---|---|---|---|---|---|---|
| Crimebusters | 1976 | Yes | | | | |
| Red Rings of Fear | 1978 | Yes | | | | |
| Once Upon a Time in America | 1984 | Yes | | | | |
| Phenomena | 1985 | Yes | Yes | | | |
| Demons | 1985 | Yes | | | | |
| Nothing Underneath | 1985 | Yes | | | | |
| Demons 2 | 1986 | Yes | Yes | | | |
| Sweets from a Stranger | 1987 | Yes | Yes | Yes | Director | |
| Opera | 1987 | Yes | | | | |
| The Church | 1989 | Yes | Yes | | | |
| Etoile | 1989 | Yes | | | | |
| Two Evil Eyes | 1990 | Yes | | | | |
| The Stendhal Syndrome | 1996 | | Yes | | | |
| Dark Glasses | 2022 | Yes | | | | |
