= Too Beautiful to Die =

- Film poster
- Directed by: Dario Piana
- Screenplay by: Dario Piana; Claudio Mancini; Achille Manzotti
- Story by: Achille Manzotti; Dario Piana
- Starring: Francois-Eric Gendron; Randi Ingermann; Florence Guérin; Giovanni Tamberi; Hélèn Jesus
- Cinematography: Alan Jones
- Edited by: Alessio Mazzoni
- Music by: Roberto Cacciapaglia
- Production companies: Gruppo Bema; Reteitalia
- Distributed by: Artisti Associati International
- Release date: 25 November 1988
- Country: Italy
- Language: English

Too Beautiful to Die (Italian: Sotto il vestito niente II) is a 1988 Italian giallo film directed by Dario Piana. The film is an in-name only sequel to Nothing Underneath (1985). It is about a group of models and dancers who find that one member of their crew has been raped and then later murdered. The group finds that the killer is taking revenge on anyone involved in the original assault, just as a new person joins their group for a music video-styled project. The film has received negative reviews from Scott Aaron Stine, Roberto Curti and L'Unita who found the film to be all style with no substance.

== Production ==
Too Beautiful to Die was shot in English and directed by Dario Piana, who mostly worked in making commercials. The film is an in-name-only sequel to Nothing Underneath (1985).

== Release ==
Too Beautiful to Die was released in November 1988 in Italy. It grossed a little under 2 billion Italian lire. Too Beautiful to Die and Nothing Underneath were released on blu-ray by Vinegar Syndrome in October 2021.

== Reception ==
From contemporary reviews, a reviewer in Italy's L'Unita noted a lack of a good script while finding that Piana had a technical expertise comparable to directors like Adrian Lyne and Ridley Scott.

Retrospective reviews from Italian critic Roberto Curti stated the film "looked like a lengthy music video with a barely coherent plot attached to it". Scott Aaron Stine wrote in his book The Gorehound's Guide to Splatter Films of the 1980s that film was "even shallower than [Nothing Underneath]" finding that it was "undeniably more stylish (the Italian crew remembered their heritage this time out) but a heck of a lot less engaging than the first film (which is saying something)" and that "the characters are all sleazy and undeserving of anyone's sympathy, and the murders quite rote, to boot."
