= Antonio Bido =

Italian film director

- Born: January 8, 1949 (age 77); Villa del Conte, Veneto, Italy
- Other name: Tony B. Dodd
- Occupations: Film director, screenwriter

Antonio Bido (sometimes credited as Tony B. Dodd; born January 8, 1949) is an Italian film director.

Bido is known for such films as Watch Me When I Kill, Blue Tornado with Patsy Kensit, David Warner and Dirk Benedict, and The Bloodstained Shadow.
