= Alberto Negrin =

Italian film director and screenwriter

- Born: 2 January 1940 (age 85); Casablanca, Morocco
- Occupation(s): Director, screenwriter
- Years active: 1965–present

Alberto Negrin (born 2 January 1940) is an Italian film director and screenwriter, known for his historical, nostalgic and political films.

Negrin started his career as a fine art photographer. In 1962 he debuted as an assistant stage director, collaborating with Orazio Costa and Giorgio Strehler.

In a career spanning over four decades, Negrin has directed over 30 films and series, including the giallo film Enigma rosso (1978), Mussolini and I (1985), starring Bob Hoskins, Anthony Hopkins and Susan Sarandon, the TV miniseries The Secret of the Sahara (1987) (with Ben Kingsley), Voyage of Terror: The Achille Lauro Affair (1989) (with Burt Lancaster), Tower of the Firstborn, Perlasca – Un eroe Italiano (2002), Il Cuore nel Pozzo (2005) and Mi Ricordo Anna Frank. Negrin is also known for his long-standing association with composer Ennio Morricone, who composed music for thirteen Negrin's feature films since 1987.

The historical drama film Perlasca – Un eroe Italiano earned him a Telegatto Award for Best TV movie. Il Cuore nel Pozzo, a film about the Foibe massacres and Istrian–Dalmatian exodus, was watched by 17 million people on its first broadcast in Italy.

== Theater ==
- Atomo, storia di una scelta (1965)
- Il bandito (1966)
- Sentite, buona gente, Peppino Marotto, poeta orgolese (film-documento) (1967)
- Colui che dice di sì e colui che dice di no (1969)
- Operai (film per il "Piccolo") (1969)
- Interrogatorio alla Avana (1972)

== Filmography ==
- Platero y yo (1968)
- Inchieste televisive in America Latina (1968)
- Il gatto con gli stivali (1969)
- Kennedy contro Hoffa (1970)
- La rosa bianca (1971)
- Astronave Terra (1971)
- La risposta di Peppino Manca (1971)
- Racket (1972)
- Lungo il fiume e sull'acqua (1972, TV miniseries)
- Il Picciotto 1973)
- L'Olandese scomparso (1974)
- Processo per l'uccisione di Raffaele Sonzogno giornalista romano (1975)
- Mayakowskji (1976)
- La spia del regime (1976)
- Il delitto Notarbartolo (1977)
- Volontari per destinazione ignota (1977)
- Red Rings of Fear (1978)
- La promessa (1979)
- Bambole: scene di un delitto perfetto (1980)
- Le multinazionali (1980)
- La quinta donna (1982)
- Mussolini and I (1985)
- The Secret of the Sahara (1987)
- Voyage of Terror: The Achille Lauro Affair (1989)
- Missus (1994)
- Tower of the Firstborn (1999)
- Nanà (2001)
- Perlasca – Un eroe Italiano (2001)
- Ics - L'amore ti dà un nome (2003)
- Il Cuore nel Pozzo (2005)
- Bartali: The Iron Man (2006)
- L'ultimo dei Corleonesi (2007)
- Pane e libertà (2009)
- Mi Ricordo Anna Frank (2009)
- L'isola (2012)
- Un mondo nuovo (2014), TV series
- Qualunque cosa succeda (2014), TV miniseries
- Tango per la libertà (2016), TV miniseries
