= Mister Scarface =

- Italian poster
- Italian: I padroni della città
- Directed by: Fernando di Leo
- Screenplay by: Fernando di Leo; Peter Berling
- Story by: Fernando di Leo
- Produced by: Armando Novelli
- Starring: Jack Palance; Al Cliver; Harry Baer; Gisela Hahn; Enzo Pulcrano; Carmelo Reale; Edmund Purdom; Vittorio Caprioli
- Cinematography: Erico Menczer
- Edited by: Amedeo Giomini
- Music by: Luis Enriquez Bacalov
- Production companies: Cineproduzioni Daunia '70; Seven Star Film Gmbh
- Distributed by: Overseas Film Company (Italy)
- Release dates: 3 December 1976 (Italy); 9 December 1977 (West Germany)
- Running time: 98 minutes
- Countries: Italy; West Germany
- Language: Italian
- Box office: ₤333,059 million

Mister Scarface (Italian: I padroni della città, lit. 'The rulers of the city') is a 1976 noir action thriller film directed by Fernando di Leo from a screenplay he co-wrote with Peter Berling. It stars Jack Palance, Harry Baer, Al Cliver, Gisela Hahn, Edmund Purdom and Vittorio Caprioli.

== Plot ==
Tony is a mob protection money collector who is unsatisfied with his position in life, and constantly dreams of living it rich in Brazil with his brother. To make some quick cash, Tony joins the forces of organized crime, making his way up the ladder. Together with Napoli, another mob enforcer, Tony hatches a plan to con mob boss “Scarface” Manzari out of a fortune, but Manzari isn't about to let that happen.

== Cast ==
- Jack Palance as "Scarface" Manzari
- Harry Baer as Tony
- Al Cliver as Ric
- Vittorio Caprioli as Vincenzo Napoli
- Gisela Hahn as Clara
- Edmund Purdom as Luigi Cerchio
- Enzo Pulcrano as Peppi
- Carmelo Reale as Luca
- Rosario Borelli as Laverde
- Peter Berling as Valentino
- Fulvio Mingozzi as Ric's Father (uncredited)

== Production ==
Mister Scarface was the last film produced by Daunia 80 Cinematografica, the independent film company that had financed all of director Fernando di Leo's previous films starting with Naked Violence, with the exception of Shoot First, Die Later and Kidnap Syndicate. The film was shot at De Paolis in Rome and on location in Rome.

== Release ==
Mister Scarface was distributed theatrically in Italy by Over Seas Film Company on 3 December 1976. It grossed a total of 333,059,400 Italian lire domestically. It was later released in West Germany as Zwei Supertypen raumen auf in Germany on 9 December 1977 with an 88-minute running time.

== Home media ==
Mister Scarface, as I Padroni Della Cittá, was released on DVD on April 4, 2005, by Raro Video. The same company released it on Blu-ray as I Padroni Della Cittá in 2012, (Note: The website gives no release date, but the back panel of the Blu-ray's cover shows the copyright date as 2012.) and in a Limited Edition for the United Kingdom on March 24, 2025, as Rulers of the City. This edition has been restored to 4K and includes dubbing options, a video essay by B movie documentarian Mike Malloy, and archival interviews.

== In popular culture ==
The dialogue is extensively sampled in the track Strong Face by Cestrian.
