= The Cat o' Nine Tails =

1971 film by Dario Argento

- Italian theatrical release poster
- Italian: Il gatto a nove code
- Directed by: Dario Argento
- Screenplay by: Dario Argento
- Story by: Dario Argento; Luigi Cozzi; Dardano Sacchetti
- Produced by: Salvatore Argento
- Starring: James Franciscus; Karl Malden; Catherine Spaak; Pier Paolo Capponi; Horst Frank; Rada Rassimov; Aldo Reggiani; Carlo Alighiero; Vittorio Congia; Ugo Fangareggi; Tom Felleghy; Emilio Marchisini; Corrado Olmi; Jacques Stany; Cinzia De Carolis; Werner Pochath; Tino Carraro
- Cinematography: Enrico Menczer
- Edited by: Franco Fraticelli
- Music by: Ennio Morricone
- Production companies: Mondial Te.Fi.; Seda Spettacoli S.p.A.; Terra-Filmkunst GmbH; Labrador Films
- Distributed by: Titanus (Italy); Constantin Film Verleih GmbH (Germany)
- Release dates: 11 February 1971 (Italy); 15 July 1971 (West Germany); 11 August 1971 (France)
- Running time: 112 minutes
- Countries: Italy; France; West Germany
- Language: English
- Box office: 2.4 billion Italian lire

The Cat o' Nine Tails (Italian: Il gatto a nove code) is a 1971 giallo film directed by Dario Argento, adapted from a story by Argento, Luigi Cozzi, Dardano Sacchetti, and an uncredited Bryan Edgar Wallace. It stars James Franciscus, Karl Malden, and Catherine Spaak.

Although it is the middle entry in Argento's so-called "Animal Trilogy" (along with The Bird with the Crystal Plumage and Four Flies on Grey Velvet), the "cat o' nine tails" does not directly refer to a literal cat, nor to a literal multi-tailed whip; rather, it refers to the number of leads that the protagonists follow in the attempt to solve a murder.

The film was a commercial success in Italy but not in the rest of Europe. However, it was acclaimed in the United States. Argento admitted in the book Broken Mirrors, Broken Minds: The Dark Dreams of Dario Argento that he was less than pleased with the film, and has repeatedly cited it as his least favorite of all of his films.

== Plot ==
An unknown individual breaks into the Terzi Medical Institute but seemingly takes nothing. One of the Institute doctors, Calabresi, confides to his fiancée, Bianca Merusi, that he knows who broke into the Institute and why. He attempts to blackmail the individual, but the assailant pushes him in front of an arriving train, killing him. A paparazzo captures Calabresi's fall, but not the killer.

Reporter Carlo Giordani has been covering the break-in investigation and writes an article about Calabresi's death, including the photo. Franco "Cookie" Arnò, a middle-aged blind man who was once an ace reporter, and his niece Lori visit Carlo after reading the article. Franco has a hunch that someone cropped the newspaper photo, and a call to the photographer confirms this. However, after they ask the photographer to print the entire picture, someone strangles him to death. The killer takes the photo and all the negatives before Carlo, Franco, and Lori arrive.

Carlo, impressed with Franco, lets him assist his investigation. Discussing the case, they observe nine leads: the five remaining Institute scientists (Mombelli, Esson, Casoni, Braun, and director Terzi), Terzi's daughter Anna, Bianca, the original break-in, and the missing photographs. They joke that the case resembles a cat o' nine tails and resolve to follow each lead.

Carlo interviews Anna, who reveals that the Institute has been researching "XYY syndrome". Their study suggests that people with the XYY chromosome have a "criminal tendency". Meanwhile, Franco and Lori meet with Bianca, who provides no additional information, but Lori tells Franco that Bianca was nervously fiddling with a locket as she spoke.

That night, Bianca searches Calabresi's car and finds a note detailing the killer's identity. She hides the note in her locket. Bianca returns to her apartment, where the killer strangles her. The killer searches her but cannot find the note, which is hidden in the locket.

Despite receiving a threatening note from the killer, Carlo and Franco continue investigating. Carlo speaks with other Institute doctors. Dr. Mombelli reveals that everyone at the Institute submitted blood samples to be tested for the XYY research. At the same time, Dr. Casoni theorizes that testing for XYY may become a method for crime prevention. That night, Carlo and Franco both avoid separate attempts to kill them. Carlo tries to look for Dr. Braun, whose escape made him a suspect, but at his boyfriend's house, he is found stabbed to death.

Franco tells Carlo that Bianca must have died because the killer suspected she had evidence, and, remembering Lori mentioning Bianca's locket, he deduces that the proof may be in the locket. They discover that Bianca has been buried with the locket, so they go to her family crypt and search her coffin. Inside the locket, they find the folded note, but before they can read it, the killer shuts the crypt door, locking Carlo inside and attacking Franco outside. The killer takes the note, but Franco stabs him with his sword cane, causing the killer to flee. The killer calls Franco and Carlo, revealing that he has kidnapped Lori and will kill her unless they stop investigating. Knowing that the killer will kill Lori anyway, they call the police.

Franco, Carlo, and the police rush to the Terzi Institute to search for Lori, but they cannot find her. Carlo follows a trail of blood to the roof and finds Casoni, the killer, still bleeding from Franco's attack. Casoni prepares to stab a bound and gagged Lori, but Carlo leaps in front of her and gets stabbed in the shoulder. The police arrive on the roof and chase Casoni. Franco stops him with his cane blade; Casoni confesses that he initially broke in to replace the records that showed he tested positive for the XYY chromosome. When Franco asks about Lori, Casoni lies to Franco that he killed her. Enraged, Franco knocks him through a skylight and down an elevator shaft to his death as a now-free Lori calls out for Franco.

== Cast ==
- James Franciscus as Carlo Giordani
- Karl Malden as Franco "Cookie" Arnò
- Catherine Spaak as Anna Terzi
- Pier Paolo Capponi as Police Superintendent Spimi
- Horst Frank as Dr. Braun
- Rada Rassimov as Bianca Merusi
- Aldo Reggiani as Dr. Casoni
- Carlo Alighiero as Dr. Calabresi
- Vittorio Congia as Righetto
- Ugo Fangareggi as Gigi, the Loser
- Tom Felleghy as Dr. Esson
- Emilio Marchisini as Dr. Mombelli
- Fulvio Mingozzi as Spimi's man
- Corrado Olmi as Morsella
- Pino Patti as the barber
- Umberto Raho as Manuel's ex-lover
- Jacques Stany as Professor Manera
- Cinzia De Carolis as Lori
- Werner Pochath as Manuel
- Tino Carraro as Professor Fulvio Terzi

== Production ==
=== Screenplay ===
Dario Argento and Dardano Sacchetti together mapped out the plot for The Cat o' Nine Tails, and split the writing of the screenplay between them. However, because the production was set up on the basis of the first 40 pages of the script, and those pages were all written by Argento, Argento demanded that he receive sole screenplay credit. Being credited for story alone meant a substantial pay cut for Sacchetti, so this set off a bitter and publicized dispute between Sacchetti and Dario and Salvatore Argento (the film's producer, and Dario's father).

=== Filming ===
The Cat o' Nine Tails was shot between September and October 1970. The film was shot on location in Berlin, Turin, and at Cinecitta Studios in Rome.

== Release ==
The Cat o' Nine Tails was released in Italy on 11 February 1971. International releases included the United States in May 1971, West Germany on 15 July 1971, where it was distributed by Constantin and in France on 11 August 1971, where it was distributed by Wild Side.

=== Box office ===
On its release in Italy in 1971, the film grossed a total of 2.4 billion Italian lire.

=== Critical reception ===
On the review aggregator website Rotten Tomatoes, The Cat o' Nine Tails holds an approval rating of 81% based on 21 critic reviews, with an average rating of 6.4/10. The site's critical consensus reads, "The Cat O'Nine Tails is a solidly entertaining Argento outing elevated by a well-chosen cast and the director's distinctive visual style." On Metacritic, the film has a weighted average score of 63 out of 100 based on 5 critic reviews, indicating "generally favorable reviews".
