= Four Flies on Grey Velvet =

1971 film by Dario Argento

- Italian theatrical release poster
- Italian: 4 mosche di velluto grigio
- Directed by: Dario Argento
- Screenplay by: Dario Argento
- Story by: Dario Argento; Luigi Cozzi; Mario Foglietti
- Produced by: Salvatore Argento
- Starring: Michael Brandon; Mimsy Farmer; Jean-Pierre Marielle; Francine Racette; Bud Spencer
- Cinematography: Franco Di Giacomo
- Edited by: Françoise Bonnot
- Music by: Ennio Morricone
- Production companies: Seda Spettacoli; Universal Productions France
- Distributed by: Cinema International Corporation
- Release dates: 17 December 1971 (Italy); 21 June 1973 (France)
- Running time: 105 minutes
- Countries: Italy; France

Four Flies on Grey Velvet (Italian: 4 mosche di velluto grigio) is a 1971 giallo film co-written and directed by Dario Argento, and starring Michael Brandon, Mimsy Farmer, Jean-Pierre Marielle, Francine Racette and Bud Spencer. The film concerns musician Roberto Tobias (Brandon), who accidentally kills a man and is then tormented by someone who witnessed the event.

The film was an Italian and French production between Seda Spettacoli and Universal Productions France. It was released in Italy by Cinema International Corporation on December 17, 1971. It is the third and final entry in Argento's so-called "Animal Trilogy" (preceded by The Bird with the Crystal Plumage and The Cat o' Nine Tails).

== Plot ==
Rock drummer Roberto Tobias has been stalked for days by a suspicious man wearing sunglasses. One night, he chases and confronts the stalker in an empty opera house, whereupon the stalker pulls a knife. In the ensuing struggle, Roberto accidentally stabs and seemingly kills the man with his own knife. A masked figure on a balcony snaps several photographs of the incident. In the following days, Roberto receives threatening letters, photographs of the incident and the dead man's identity card, which reveals his name to be Carlo Marosi. He is also plagued by a recurring nightmare in which he is publicly beheaded in a square in Saudi Arabia, believing it is a premonition.

At home one night, Roberto is ambushed by the masked figure, who talks of not being finished with him yet before knocking him out. When Roberto's wife Nina wakes up, he confesses everything to her, but refuses to go to the police for fear of being arrested for Marosi's murder; the couple's live-in maid, Amelia, overhears their conversation. Knowing the masked figure's identity, Amelia tries to blackmail the culprit and arranges a meeting in a park, where she is killed by the unseen assailant. Despite Roberto's reluctance, Nina's cousin Dalia arrives to stay with Nina and Roberto.

It is revealed that Marosi is still alive and conspired with Roberto's tormentor to fake his own death using a prop knife. Unnerved by Amelia's murder, Marosi tries to back out of their agreement, but the unseen tormentor kills him. The murderer then breaks into Roberto and Nina's home at night, abducts their pet cat, and leaves taunting notes about how easy it was.

Roberto hires Gianni Arrosio, a flamboyant gay private investigator recommended by his beatnik artist friend Godfrey, to identify his tormentor. When Roberto returns home, he finds Nina leaving; she tells him she refuses to stay in the house while the stalker is at large. Roberto resolves to remain. That evening, Dalia offers to take care of Roberto, and the two begin an affair.

Arrosio visits Villa Rapidi, a psychiatric facility, and speaks with a doctor about an unnamed patient diagnosed as a homicidal maniac. When this patient's father suddenly died, the psychotic symptoms inexplicably disappeared, and the patient was discharged. Later, while trailing the unidentified patient in a subway station, Arrosio is ambushed and murdered with a poison-filled syringe in a bathroom stall.

Just as Dalia begins to suspect the killer's identity, the killer appears and stabs her to death while she is alone in Roberto's house. The police use optography to generate the last image Dalia saw before death but only obtain a blurry picture of four dark smudges against a grey background. The technician notes that the resulting image resembles four flies.

Godfrey advises Roberto to wait in his house with a gun that night, deducing that the killer will come for him next. As Roberto waits in the dark, Godfrey calls to check on him, but the call is cut off. Shortly afterwards, Nina arrives home. Roberto urges her to leave for her safety, but he notices the pendant necklace she wears contains a fly enclosed in glass, and as it swings, it gives the appearance of several flies.

As Roberto realizes Nina is the killer, she grabs his gun and shoots him in the shoulder. Holding Roberto at gunpoint, Nina tells him that because her abusive stepfather wanted a son at all costs, he forced her to wear boys' clothing and ultimately committed her to the Villa Rapidi asylum. His death cured her but robbed her of the chance to enact revenge, leaving her frustrated. After Nina met Roberto, who bore a striking resemblance to her stepfather, she plotted to torment and murder Roberto as a proxy for her stepfather.

Nina repeatedly shoots Roberto until Godfrey arrives, distracting Nina before Roberto knocks the gun out of her hands. As Nina flees, Roberto tells Godfrey that he has realized that the protagonist of his nightmares was actually Nina. Nina speeds away in Roberto's car but crashes into the back of a truck. The truck's rear bumper decapitates her, and the car explodes into flames.

== Cast ==
- Michael Brandon as Roberto Tobias
- Mimsy Farmer as Nina Tobias
- Jean-Pierre Marielle as Gianni Arrosio
- Aldo Bufi Landi as the pathologist
- Calisto Calisti as Carlo Marosi
- Marisa Fabbri as Amelia, the maid
- Oreste Lionello as the professor
- Fabrizio Moroni as Mirko
- Corrado Olmi as Porter
- Stefano Satta Flores as Andrea
- Laura Troschel (credited as Costanza Spada) as Maria
- Francine Racette as Dalia
- Bud Spencer as Godfrey (Diomede in the Italian version)
- Guerrino Crivello as Rambaldi
- Gildo Di Marco as the postman
- Tom Felleghy as Inspector Pini
- Fulvio Mingozzi as recording studio manager
- Jacques Stany as the psychiatrist

== Production ==
=== Casting ===
Some of the earlier cast considerations for the main role Roberto were Terence Stamp, Michael York and even some members of the Beatles. York was even signed to a contract, but dropped out at the last minute after shooting on Zeppelin went over-schedule. Argento cast Michael Brandon after seeing his performance in Lovers and Other Strangers (1970).

Bud Spencer appeared in the film for free, as a favor to his friend Argento, in exchange for his likeness not being used in the film's marketing. The character of Diomede/Godfrey was based on a character in the novel The Screaming Mimi, which had previously been the basis for Argento's The Bird with the Crystal Plumage (1970).

=== Filming ===
The film was shot on location in Rome (the EUR district, Ponte Marconi and Piazza dei Quiriti), Turin (Piazza Castello, the Auditorium RAI, the Galleria Umberto I, the Turin Conservatory, the Galleria Subalpina and the Caffè Mulassano), Milan (the Milan Metro), Tivoli (the Villa d'Este) and Spoleto (Teatro Nuovo). The mosque featured in Roberto's nightmares is the Great Mosque of Kairouan in Tunisia.

Argento did not want to use the "image caught in the retina" plot device since it was too fantastic, but changed his mind after special effects artist Carlo Rambaldi showed him how the effect would appear on film.

The film features an early use of a "bullet time" slow-motion effect, used in the climax when Roberto is shot by his wife. Argento later used similar effects in Opera and The Stendhal Syndrome.

=== Music ===
According to Luigi Cozzi, Argento originally approached British rock group Deep Purple to score the film, who produced several demo tracks. However, the collaboration fell through due to an Italian law that regulated public subsidies for arts projects involving foreign personnel. Argento and Ennio Morricone had a falling out during post-production, and would not work together again until 1996's The Stendhal Syndrome.

== Release ==
Four Flies on Grey Velvet was released in Italy on 17 December 1971 and in France on 21 June 1973.

=== Home media ===
It was not until early 2009 that the film was made available to home video audiences in a legitimate version, both domestically or internationally, with the exception of the long out-of-print obscure French VHS. The rights to this film (at least in America) are owned by Paramount Pictures, which had chosen not to release it.

MYA Communication released a region 1 DVD of Four Flies on Grey Velvet on 24 February 2009. The disc contains an uncut, completely remastered print of this "lost" film, featuring theatrical trailers, the English language opening and ending credits and an extensive photo gallery. However, this release omits 30–40 seconds of footage due to print damage.

To celebrate the film's 40th anniversary and to mark 20 years since it was thought to be lost, Shameless Screen Entertainment released it on Blu-ray and DVD in the United Kingdom on 30 January 2012.

In 2022, Severin Films released the film on 4k UHD in the United States. Plaion Pictures (Germany) followed in 2023, with Shameless Screen Entertainment issuing their 4k UHD release in the United Kingdom in 2025.

== Reception ==
=== Box office ===
From 23 December 1971 to 30 January 1972, the film grossed $1.2 million from 46 theatres in Italy.

=== Critical reception ===
From contemporary reviews, Howard Thompson, in his review for The New York Times, praised the film for its "striking, imaginative color photography and deep-freeze pacing and atmosphere" and highlighted the sequence where Amelia is trapped in the park as "spine-tingling", "superb" and "Argento at his chilling best". However, he criticized the plot as "not only old but farfetched" and the dialogue as "banal", and went on to say that "[a]ll that circuitous teasing and those red herrings don't produce a shred of real evidence to nibble on. You're on your own, in pure hit-or-miss speculation." Roger Ebert gave the film a mixed review of two-and-a-half stars out of four, deeming it a "badly dubbed and incoherent murder thriller" with "a conclusion that's so arbitrary we feel tricked." He did, however, give praise to Mimsy Farmer and said of her that she "deserves to get some of those Mia Farrow roles."

Gene Siskel of the Chicago Tribune gave the film one star out of four and wrote, "Argento's script contains more red herrings than the Cape Cod Room. Each time evidence overwhelmingly points to a possible threat to our bushy-haired hero that person is bumped off and the guessing game begins anew. I didn't find that rhythm the least bit entertaining." Variety faulted "a script bogged down with farce comedy, unneeded sex, coarse language and trite dialogue." Kevin Thomas of the Los Angeles Times wrote that the film generally "works when nobody's talking and the camera's moving." He thought that several "badly dubbed, broadly burlesqued characters are totally ludicrous and destroy utterly the film's credibility." David Pirie of the Monthly Film Bulletin noted it being "full of slick visual conceits and glossy set-pieces, this is clearly Argento's most expensive and ambitious thriller yet" while stating its still as "flat and predictable as that of the most meager Italian 'B' feature."

Leonard Maltin's Movie Guide gave the film two stars out of four and opined it was an "[u]nabsorbing psychological murder-mystery with performers who walk through their roles in a very disinterested fashion."

In 1978, writer Fran Lebowitz, who had a column in Interview magazine where she reviewed bad films, told Glenn O'Brien in an issue of High Times: "The worst movie I ever saw was called Four Flies on Gray Velvet, with Mimsy Farmer, one of your great loves. But to this day I have never seen a worse movie."

AllMovie gave the film a positive review, calling it "an unfortunately overlooked and hard-to-find choice nugget in his [Argento's] oeuvre".

== See also ==
- List of Italian films of 1971
- List of French films of 1971
