= Gildo Di Marco =

Italian actor (born 1946)

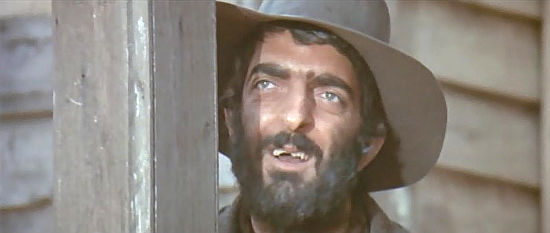
- Gildo Di Marco in Arizona Colt Returns (1971)
- Born: 20 January 1946 (age 79); Sulmona, Abruzzo
- Occupation: Actor

Gildo Di Marco (born 20 January 1946) is an Italian actor.

He played Garullo along Fulvio Mingozzi, Werner Peters, Reggie Nalder and Suzy Kendall in L'uccello dalle piume di cristallo (1970), by Dario Argento, postman in Four Flies on Grey Velvet (1971), and Desiderio in Mala tempora, by Stefano Amadio. He appeared in Spaghetti Western films such as Arizona Colt Returns (1970) by Sergio Martino, and Bullet for a Stranger (1971) by Anthony Ascott.

He also appeared in the TV series Door into Darkness.

== Filmography ==
- Ace High (1968) as Henchman Choked by Hutch Bessy (uncredited)
- The 5-Man Army (1969) as Mexican in Back of Carriage (uncredited)
- The Bird with the Crystal Plumage (1970) as Garullo
- Arizona Lets Fly and Kill Everybody (1970) as Filthy Bottle
- Brancaleone at the Crusades (1970)
- Armiamoci e partite! (1971) as Pilota tedesco
- They Call Him Cemetery (1971) as Undertaker
- Trinity Is Still My Name (1971) as Peasant injured by monks
- Four Flies on Grey Velvet (1971) as Postman
- His Name Was Holy Ghost (1972) as Spirito Santo's Men
- The Terror with Cross-Eyes (1972) as Gangster
- Sentían una extraña y excitante peste de dólares (1973)
- La puerta en la oscuridad (1973, TV Series) as Il fornaio
- Un verano para recordar (1974) as Giuseppe

== Bibliography ==
- Pitts, Michael R. (13 December 2012). Western Movies: A Guide to 5,105 Feature Films (2nd ed.). McFarland Publishing. p. 484. ISBN 9781476600901.
