= Screaming Mimi =

Screaming Mimi may refer to:

== Military ==
- A nickname for the Nebelwerfer, a piece of German World War II rocket artillery
- A nickname for the United States Air Force Cessna T-37 Tweet

== Other uses ==
- The Screaming Mimi (novel), a 1949 mystery novel by Fredric Brown
- Screaming Mimi (film), a 1958 film adaptation of Brown's novel
- Pink Sikorsky S-58DT, a helicopter in the 1980s TV series Riptide
- Songbird (character), a Marvel Comics character, formerly known as Screaming Mimi

== See also ==
- Screaming Meemees, a New Zealand band that formed in the 1980s
