= Torso (1973 film) =

1973 film by Sergio Martino

- Theatrical release poster
- Italian: I corpi presentano tracce di violenza carnale
- Directed by: Sergio Martino
- Screenplay by: Ernesto Gastaldi; Sergio Martino
- Story by: Sergio Martino
- Produced by: Carlo Ponti
- Starring: Suzy Kendall; Tina Aumont; Luc Merenda; John Richardson; Roberto Bisacco; Ernesto Colli; Angela Covello; Carla Brait; Cristina Airoldi; Luciano Bartoli; Carlo Alighiero
- Cinematography: Giancarlo Ferrando
- Edited by: Eugenio Alabiso
- Music by: Guido & Maurizio De Angelis
- Production company: Compagnia Cinematografica Champion
- Distributed by: Interfilm
- Release date: 4 January 1973
- Running time: 93 minutes
- Country: Italy
- Language: Italian

Torso (Italian: I corpi presentano tracce di violenza carnale, lit. 'The Bodies Bear Traces of Carnal Violence'), also released as Carnal Violence, is a 1973 Italian giallo film directed by Sergio Martino, produced by Carlo Ponti, and starring Suzy Kendall, Tina Aumont, Luc Merenda, and John Richardson. Martino’s fifth giallo, the film centers on a string of brutal murders of young female students at an international college in Perugia. It has been described as the earliest example of a slasher film.

== Plot ==
After Università per Stranieri di Perugia art professor Franz's lecture on Perugino's painting of Saint Sebastian, Jane approaches him for further discussion, accompanied by her friend Dani. Another student, Stefano, who has unrequited feelings for Dani, joins in. Franz leaves, and Dani rejects Stefano's offer to drive her home and rejoins Jane and their friends Carol, Katia, and Ursula. That night, a masked peeping tom strangles Carol's friend Flo with a black-and-red patterned scarf after killing Flo's lover.

The next day, Carol sees young doctor Roberto buying a black-and-red scarf from a street vendor. Carol meets with Dani and is distraught to learn of the murders. Jane and Franz agree to attend a concert together. Jane witnesses Dani's wealthy uncle trying to end a secret romantic affair with Carol. That night, Stefano pays for a prostitute, whom he assaults for implying that he is homosexual or impotent. Carol attends a party with two men, Peter and George, who are infuriated when she rejects their sexual advances and leaves. Carol wanders through a nearby swamp, where she is murdered by Flo's killer.

Police inform the students of the killer's scarves and implore them to report any information. The killer telephones Dani and threatens to kill her if she reports who she saw with a black-on-red scarf. After escaping another encounter with Stefano, who grabs and kisses Dani against her will, she remembers that Stefano wore a black-and-red scarf the day after Flo's murder. Dani's uncle suggests that she spend time away at the family villa in Tagliacozzo. Dani invites Jane, Katia, and Ursula to accompany her. The killer runs over the street vendor for blackmailing him.

Dani encounters Roberto on the train to Tagliacozzo. After learning that Stefano left his apartment without explanation, Jane drives to Tagliacozzo and leaves her car to be washed overnight at a service station before joining the group at the villa. Dani realizes that the pattern on Stefano's scarf did not match the one shown by the police, but she insists that she saw someone wearing a matching scarf. The killer spies on Katia and Ursula having sex at the villa. Upon discovering that a local peeping tom is also spying on them, the killer murders him. The next day, Stefano watches the women at the villa from afar. When Jane sprains her ankle, Roberto is summoned and gives her a sedative to help her sleep. After Roberto leaves, Dani responds to a knock on the door, and Stefano's corpse falls to the floor in front of her, revealing the killer, who then murders Dani, Katia, and Ursula.

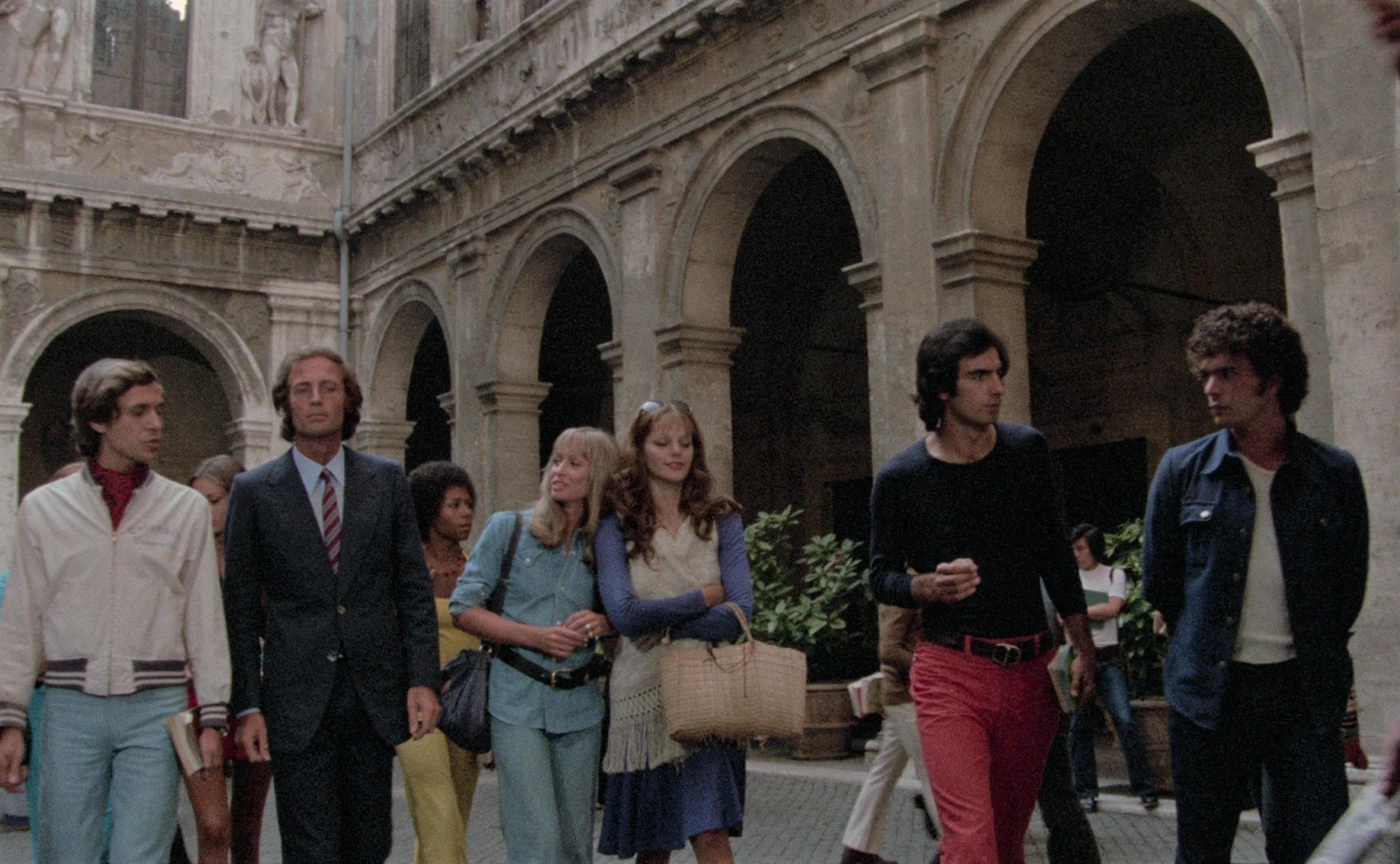
John Richardson, Carla Brait, Suzy Kendall, Tina Aumont and Luciano Bartoli in a scene from the film

Jane wakes to the aftermath of the massacre and hides while the killer dismembers and removes her friends' bodies. She tries to attract attention from townsfolk by signalling with a mirror from the window. The killer locks up the villa and departs, trapping Jane in her room. That night, the killer returns and reveals himself to be Franz, who became a psychopathic misogynist after the childhood trauma of witnessing his brother fall to his death while fetching a girl's doll. He killed Flo and Carol for blackmailing him after seducing him into a threesome, then killed any possible witnesses, including Dani, who briefly saw him wearing a black-and-red scarf on the day he followed Carol. Franz tries to strangle Jane but is suddenly attacked by Roberto, who deduced that Jane was in trouble after seeing the flashes from the villa window and discovering that Jane had not collected her car from the service station. Roberto pursues Franz to a barn and then to the cliffside, where the two fight until Franz falls to his death.

== Cast ==
- Suzy Kendall as Jane
- Tina Aumont as Dani (Daniela)
- Luc Merenda as Roberto
- John Richardson as Franz
- Roberto Bisacco as Stefano Vanzi
- Ernesto Colli as Gianni Tomasso, the street vendor
- Angela Covello as Katia
- Carla Brait as Ursula
- Conchita Airoldi (credited as Cristina Airoldi) as Carol Peterson
- Patrizia Adiutori as Flo (Florence) Heineken
- Luciano Bartoli as Peter
- Gianni Greco as George
- Luciano De Ambrosis as Inspector Martino
- Carlo Alighiero as Uncle Nino

== Release ==
The film was released under its original title in Italy on 4 January 1973. Joseph Brenner Associates later distributed a recut and rescored dubbed version as Torso in the United States and the film became a success there on the drive-in and grindhouse circuits, often as a double feature with The Texas Chain Saw Massacre (1974).

The film was released on DVD in the United States by Anchor Bay Entertainment in 2000 and in the United Kingdom by Shameless in 2007. It has since had Blu-ray releases by Blue Underground in 2011, Shameless in 2017 and Arrow Video in 2018.

=== Critical response ===
George Anderson of the Pittsburgh Post-Gazette deemed the film "another display of softcore sex and seamy violence that might better have been kept abroad." Joe Baltake of the Philadelphia Daily News wrote: "Blood flows freely and limbs detach easily, in Sergio Martino's Torso, a disagreeable Italian import with—not surprisingly—little to recommend it." The Los Angeles Times's Linda Gross wrote that the film was a "lazy suspense movie" with a "disjointed and loose" screenplay.

The extended cat-and-mouse villa scenes between the killer and the final girl in the film's last 30 minutes have led to Torso being retrospectively recognised as a "proto-slasher film". Quentin Tarantino showed his print of the film at the 1999 QT-Fest and fellow filmmaker Eli Roth has cited the film among his favourite gialli and an influence on Grindhouse and Hostel: Part II (both 2007).

PopMatters gave it a 7 out of 10 rating, while Slant Magazine said it "pales next to director Sergio Martino's more inventive sleaze-thrillers (The Strange Vice of Mrs. Wardh, All the Colors of the Dark)".

In 2017, Complex named Torso the sixth best slasher film of all time.

== See also ==
- List of films featuring home invasions
- List of Italian films of 1973
