= Shoot First, Die Later =

- Directed by: Fernando Di Leo
- Screenplay by: Fernando Di Leo
- Story by: Sergio Donati
- Produced by: Galliano Juso; Ettore Rosboch
- Starring: Luc Merenda; Salvo Randone; Delia Boccardo
- Cinematography: Franco Villa
- Edited by: Amedeo Giomini
- Music by: Luis Enriquez Bacalov
- Production companies: Cinemaster; Mount Street Film; Mara Film
- Distributed by: Titanus
- Release date: 22 March 1974 (Italy)
- Running time: 95 minutes
- Country: Italy
- Box office: ₤676 million

Shoot First, Die Later (Italian: Il poliziotto è marcio) is a 1974 Italian poliziottesco noir drama film directed by Fernando Di Leo. Di Leo reprises some elements of the novel Rogue Cop by William P. McGivern. Luc Merenda later starred in two other Di Leo's films, Kidnap Syndicate and Nick the Sting.

== Plot ==
A policeman who has dealings with local crime begins to get in over his head. At first content with taking payments for helping contraband tobacco and alcohol escape notice of the authorities, he draws the line when the criminals get into the drug smuggling business. A local busybody has inadvertently witnessed the disposal of one of their victims and reported their license plates to the policeman's father, who is a sergeant. Gradually more people around him turn up dead and he becomes increasingly desperate.

== Cast ==
- Luc Merenda: Domenico Malacarne
- Delia Boccardo: Sandra
- Richard Conte: Mazzoni
- Raymond Pellegrin: Pascal
- Vittorio Caprioli: Esposito
- Salvo Randone: Marshal Malacarne, father of Domenico
- Gianni Santuccio: Quaestor
- Elio Zamuto: Rio
- Marisa Traversi: Countess Nevio
- Aldo Valletti: Policeman

== Release ==
Shoot First, Die Later was distributed theatrically in Italy by Titanus on 22 March 1974. The film grossed a total of 675,994,000 Italian lire on its domestic release.

It has been released as blu-ray by Raro as part of a set collecting the films of Di Leo, "The Italian Crime Collection Vol. 2."

== See also ==
- List of Italian films of 1974

== Notes ==
=== References ===
- Curti, Roberto (2013). Italian Crime Filmography, 1968-1980. McFarland. ISBN 978-0786469765.
