= Luciano Bartoli =

Italian actor (1946–2019)

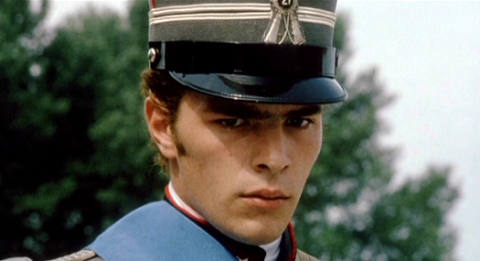
- Bartoli in Oedipus Rex
- Born: 17 October 1946; Rome, Italy
- Died: 1 February 2019 (aged 72); Rome Italy
- Occupation: Actor
- Years active: 1967–2007

Luciano Bartoli (17 October 1946 – 1 February 2019) was an Italian actor.

== Biography ==
Bartoli began his film career in 1967, at the age of 21, starring in Pier Paolo Pasolini's Oedipus Rex, while during the 1970s and the 1980s he alternated performances in some B movies and several roles in films directed by authors such as Marco Bellocchio, Citto Maselli and Giuseppe Tornatore. Bartoli died on 1 February 2019, at the age of 72.

== Partial filmography ==
- Oedipus Rex (1967)
- The Fifth Cord (1971)
- The Violent Professionals (1973)
- Torso (1973)
- The Suspect (1975)
- Antonio Gramsci: The Days of Prison (1977)
- Lion of the Desert (1981)
- Henry IV (1984)
- The Inquiry (1986)
- The Professor (1986)
- The Moro Affair (1987)
- Traces of an Amorous Life (1990)
- The Amusements of Private Life (1990)
- Chimera (2001)
- Heaven (2002)
- In Your Hands (2007)
