= The Bird with the Crystal Plumage =

1970 film by Dario Argento

- Italian theatrical release poster
- Italian: L'uccello dalle piume di cristallo
- Directed by: Dario Argento
- Written by: Dario Argento
- Produced by: Salvatore Argento
- Starring: Tony Musante; Suzy Kendall; Enrico Maria Salerno; Eva Renzi; Umberto Raho; Raf Valenti; Giuseppe Castellano; Mario Adorf
- Cinematography: Vittorio Storaro
- Edited by: Franco Fraticelli
- Music by: Ennio Morricone
- Production companies: Seda Spettacoli S.p.A.; CCC Film GmbH
- Distributed by: Titanus (Italy); Constantin Film (West Germany)
- Release dates: 27 February 1970 (Italy); 24 June 1970 (West Germany)
- Running time: 96 minutes
- Countries: Italy; West Germany
- Languages: Italian; English

The Bird with the Crystal Plumage (Italian: L'uccello dalle piume di cristallo) is a 1970 giallo film written and directed by Dario Argento, in his directorial debut. It stars Tony Musante as an American writer in Rome who witnesses a serial killer targeting young women and tries to uncover the murderer's identity before he becomes their next victim. The cast also features Suzy Kendall, Enrico Maria Salerno, Eva Renzi, Umberto Raho and Mario Adorf.

A co-production of Italy and West Germany, The Bird with the Crystal Plumage is the first in what has been called Argento's thematic "Animal Trilogy", along with his next two gialli, The Cat o' Nine Tails (1971) and Four Flies on Grey Velvet (1972). Argento's screenplay borrows liberally from Fredric Brown's 1949 novel The Screaming Mimi, which had previously been adapted into a 1958 American film.

An international commercial and critical success on release, The Bird with the Crystal Plumage has been credited with popularizing giallo, an Italian genre of horror-thriller developed in the 1960s, and launched Argento's career as a filmmaker.

== Plot ==
Sam Dalmas is an American writer vacationing in Rome with his English model girlfriend, Julia, while trying to overcome his writer's block. They are preparing to return to the United States in two days.

While walking home one evening, Sam witnesses a woman being attacked in an art gallery by a male figure wearing a black raincoat and black leather gloves. Attempting to intervene, Sam becomes trapped between the gallery's mechanically operated sliding glass doors while the assailant escapes. The woman, Monica Ranieri—the wife of the gallery's owner, Alberto Ranieri—survives the attack and the local police confiscate Sam's passport to prevent him from leaving the country. The assailant is believed to be a serial killer who has so far murdered three young women across the city, and Sam is an important witness.

Sam is haunted by what he saw that night, convinced that some vital clue is evading him, and he resolves to help Inspector Morosini in his investigation. He visits an antique shop where the first victim worked, discovering that the last item she sold on the day of her death was an eerie painting of a man in a raincoat stabbing a young woman amidst a snowy landscape. When the killer phones Sam at his apartment, threatening to kill Julia unless he drops his investigation, he records the call.

Sam visits the artist of the painting in a nearby town, under the pretense that he wants to buy a painting. The artist tells Sam that the painting in question is inspired by an actual attack on a young woman that occurred ten years earlier. Meanwhile, the killer attempts to attack Julia while she is alone in Sam's apartment, but Sam returns just in time to save her, and the killer flees.

The police manage to isolate an odd cricketing noise in the background of the telephone call recording, which is later revealed by Sam's ornithologist friend Carlo to be the call of a rare bird from the South Caucasus known as "the bird with the crystal plumage" due to the translucent glint of its feathers; the only specimen in Italy is kept in a zoo in Rome. Sam, Julia, Carlo and the police immediately go to the zoo, where Sam observes that the Ranieri apartment overlooks the bird's cage. When screams are heard from the apartment, Sam and the others rush over to find Monica and Alberto struggling over a knife. When the police intervene, Alberto falls out the window onto the sidewalk below. As he dies, he confesses to all the murders.

Realizing that Julia has disappeared, Sam eventually tracks her down to a dark apartment, where he finds Carlo dead and Julia bound and gagged. He then turns around to see Monica in a black raincoat, laughing hysterically. Sam soon realizes that what he witnessed that night in the gallery was not Monica being attacked, but Monica attempting to kill Alberto. She flees, and he pursues her to the art gallery. There, Monica drops a heavy, spiked sculpture onto Sam, pinning him to the floor. She begins taunting him with a knife, and as she prepares to kill him, the police—who were notified by an escaping Julia—burst in and apprehend her. Sam is freed, and Monica is taken to a psychiatric hospital.

It is revealed through a television interview with a psychiatrist that Monica was the victim of a traumatic attack ten years before. Seeing the painting of the attack drove her insane, causing her to identify with the assailant and not the victim. Alberto likewise suffered from an induced psychosis, helping her cover up the murders. Sam and Julia are reunited and fly back to the United States.

== Cast ==
- Tony Musante as Sam Dalmas
- Suzy Kendall as Julia
- Enrico Maria Salerno as Inspector Morosini
- Eva Renzi as Monica Ranieri
- Umberto Raho as Alberto Ranieri
- Raf Valenti as Professor Carlo Dover
- Giuseppe Castellano as Monti
- Mario Adorf as Berto Consalvi
- Pino Patti as Faiena
- Gildo Di Marco as Garullo
- Rosa Toros as the fourth victim
- Omar Bonaro as a police detective
- Fulvio Mingozzi as a police detective
- Werner Peters as the antique dealer
- Karen Valenti as Tina, the fifth victim
- Carla Mancini as the girl watching TV
- Reggie Nalder as Needles (uncredited)

== Influences ==
Though Dario Argento is credited as the film's sole writer, the story closely follows the 1949 pulp novel The Screaming Mimi by American writer Fredric Brown. Argento was initially exposed to the book by director Bernardo Bertolucci, who was considering purchasing the film rights. Among the changes Argento made to Brown's story were a change of location from Chicago to Rome, making the killer the wife of an art dealer rather than an exotic dancer, and having the artwork that triggers her be a painting rather than a statuette. Brown's novel had previously been made into a Hollywood film, Screaming Mimi (1958), directed by Gerd Oswald.

The story is thought to have been influenced by the early Mario Bava giallo The Girl Who Knew Too Much (1963), which also involves a witness to a murder later realizing that the person they took to be the victim was actually the perpetrator. The killer's outfit of a black raincoat, hat and gloves, which would go on to become a standard giallo trope, was introduced in Bava's Blood and Black Lace (1964).

== Production ==
=== Development ===
Argento was introduced to Brown's novel by his friend Bernardo Bertolucci, who had acquired the rights to Brown's novel and intended to direct a film adaptation himself. Argento wrote the screenplay over several weeks vacationing in Tunisia. Titanus mogul Goffredo Lombardo optioned the script after being impressed by Argento's screenwriting work on the film Metti, una sera a cena (1969).

Argento initially had no intention of directing the film, but after several directors including Duccio Tessari and Terence Young turned it down, Argento decided to make it himself, and got his father Salvatore to produce. He and his assistant Aldo Lado heavily rewrote the script during filming, so that it became less and less directly tied to Brown's novel.

=== Casting ===
Argento cast American actor Tony Musante in the lead role, after he had previously starred in Metti, una sera a cena. According to Argento, their relationship was a tense one, as Musante's method acting sensibilities clashed with Argento's technical directing style.

Through a co-production deal with West German studio CCC Film, the film used West German actors Eva Renzi, Mario Adorf and Werner Peters. Austrian-born character actor Reggie Nalder, who had a played a hitman in Alfred Hitchcock's The Man Who Knew Too Much (1956), was cast after Argento saw him filming an American TV show in Rome.

=== Filming and post-production ===
Filming took place primarily on location in Rome, mostly in the Flaminio quartiere. Studio scenes were shot at the INCIR De Paolis soundstages. The racecourse sequence was filmed at the Agnano Racecourse in Naples.

Argento's inexperience as director led him to nearly be fired and replaced by Lombardo mid-production, but thanks to his robust contract he was able to complete the film.

To accommodate the international cast and better facilitate English-language distribution, the film was shot primarily in English and MOS, with all dialogue and foley dubbed in. The English-language version was supervised by Robert Rietti; Tony Musante and Suzy Kendall did their own English dubbing. The Italian version was overseen by Mimmo Palmara.

=== Music ===
The score for The Bird with the Crystal Plummage was composed by Ennio Morricone, his first for a giallo film and his first of five collaborations with Argento.

== Release ==
The Bird with the Crystal Plumage was released at the Gloria-Palast in Berlin, Germany, on 24 June 1970 with a 94-minute running time. In Germany, it was marketed as an adaptation of a Bryan Edgar Wallace story. It was released in the United Kingdom under the title The Gallery Murders.

=== Critical reception ===
The Bird with the Crystal Plumage was relatively well received by critics. Roger Greenspun of The New York Times wrote that the film "has the energy to support its elaborateness and the decency to display its devices with style. Something from each of its better models has stuck, and it is pleasant to rediscover old horrors in such handsome new décor." A number of American critics compared the film (favourably or unfavourably) to the thrillers of Alfred Hitchcock, such as Roger Ebert, who gave the film three out of four stars, writing, "it's a pretty good [thriller]", but that "its scares are on a much more basic level than in, say, a thriller by Hitchcock."

The film was nominated for an Edgar Allan Poe Award for Best Motion Picture in 1971.

The film was placed 272nd on Empire magazine's "500 Greatest Movies of All Time" list.

On the review aggregator website Rotten Tomatoes, the film has an approval rating of 85% based on 39 reviews, with an average rating of 7.8/10. The website's critics consensus reads, "Combining a deadly thriller plot with the stylized violence that would become his trademark, The Bird with the Crystal Plumage marked an impressive horror debut for Dario Argento."

=== Home media ===
The film was originally cut by 20 seconds for its US release and received a 'GP' rating, though it was later re-classified as 'PG'. The film was later released on DVD by VCI with the restored violence, but had problems with a sequence of shots referred to as "the panty removal scene". Later pressings fixed it. Blue Underground later obtained the rights and re-released the film completely uncut, adding an extra shot of violence previously unseen. The picture was completely restored and the sound was remixed into both 5.1 audio for both Italian and English tracks, but contained another soundtrack remixed into DTS-ES 6.1 Discrete in English.

Blue Underground released the film on Blu-ray Disc on 24 February 2009. Tech specs saw a BD-50 dual-layer presentation with newly remastered 1080p video and English audio tracks in DTS-HD Lossless Master Audio 7.1 Surround and Dolby TrueHD 7.1 Surround plus the original Italian audio track. It is now out-of-print. VCI announced on their Facebook page that they plan to release the film on Blu-ray Disc sometime soon and was released on 12 September 2013.

Arrow released the film on Blu-ray in the United Kingdom on 13 June 2011, but drew some criticism due to the film being cropped to 2.00:1 (which is director of photography Vittorio Storaro's current Univisium aspect ratio). In June 2017, Arrow re-released the film on a limited edition Blu-ray/DVD combo pack in the US and the UK containing a remastered 4K transfer from the original camera negative made exclusively for the release.

=== Impact ===
The Bird with the Crystal Plumage has been credited as a significant milestone in the popularization of the giallo genre. The genre is considered to date back at least as far as Mario Bava's 1963 film, The Girl Who Knew Too Much, but The Bird with the Crystal Plumage was the first giallo to achieve significant commercial and critical success. The film spawned a brief fad for gialli with similar verbose titles involving animals such as Black Belly of the Tarantula (1971), The Iguana with the Tongue of Fire (1971) and Don't Torture a Duckling (1972).

== See also ==
- Vittorio Storaro filmography
