= The Nun and the Devil =

- Theatrical release poster
- Directed by: Domenico Paolella (as Paolo Dominici)
- Written by: Tonino Cervi; Domenico Paolella
- Produced by: Tonino Cervi
- Starring: Anne Heywood; Luc Merenda; Ornella Muti; Martine Brochard
- Cinematography: Giuseppe Ruzzolini
- Edited by: Nino Baragli
- Music by: Piero Piccioni
- Release date: January 25, 1973
- Running time: 91 minutes
- Country: Italy
- Language: Italian

The Nun and the Devil (Italian: Le Monache di Sant'Arcangelo) is a 1973 Italian erotic nunsploitation film directed by Domenico Paolella. It is also known as: Sisters of Satan (UK) and The Nuns of Saint Archangel (US). The action is set in the 16th century at the convent of Sant Arcangelo, near Naples, then under Spanish rule. The success of the film resulted in another period drama/nunsploitation film by Paolella released the same year, Story of a Cloistered Nun, an Italian/French/West German co-production starring Eleonora Giorgi.

The opening credits state that the movie is "Based on authentic 16th Century records and a story by Stendhal"—possibly Stendhal's L'Abbesse de Castro (1832) is meant.

== Plot ==
The story involves the power struggles and sexual intrigues of a group of good-looking nuns at the Sant Arcangelo Convent and in particular the machinations of Sister Julia as she attempts, by any means possible, to succeed to the position of the dying Mother Superior. The nuns struggle with their vows of celibacy, some inclining to lesbianism whilst others invite male lovers secretly into their cells. Meanwhile, a corrupt church hopes to benefit from an aristocratic donation to the Convent, before launching an inquisition into the lubricious and corrupt activities of the inmates of the Convent. There then follow graphic scenes of torture as miscreant nuns are stripped naked and tortured with a variety of devices in order to elicit a confession of their misdemeanours. The film ends with a resonant condemnation of the power hungry and corrupt church by Sister Julia after she has been found guilty and compelled to take poison to end her life.

== Cast ==
- Anne Heywood as Sister Julia
- Luc Merenda as Vicar Carafa
- Ornella Muti as Sister Isabella
- Pier Paolo Capponi as Don Carlos Ribera
- Martine Brochard as Sister Chiara
- Claudia Gravy as Sister Carmela (credited as Claudia Gravi)
- Maria Cumani Quasimodo as Sister Lavinia
- Claudio Gora as Cardinal d'Arezzo
- Duilio Del Prete as Pietro

== Production ==
The production obtained permission to shoot the scenes in a real convent (Fossanova Abbey in Priverno, Latina, Italy) by withholding details of the plot. Heywood had previously played a nun in The Lady of Monza.

== In popular culture ==
The electro-industrial band My Life with the Thrill Kill Kult has sampled the English-language dub of the film extensively in songs such as "And This Is What the Devil Does" and "Kooler Than Jesus".
