= Tino Carraro =

Italian stage, television and film actor (1910–1995)

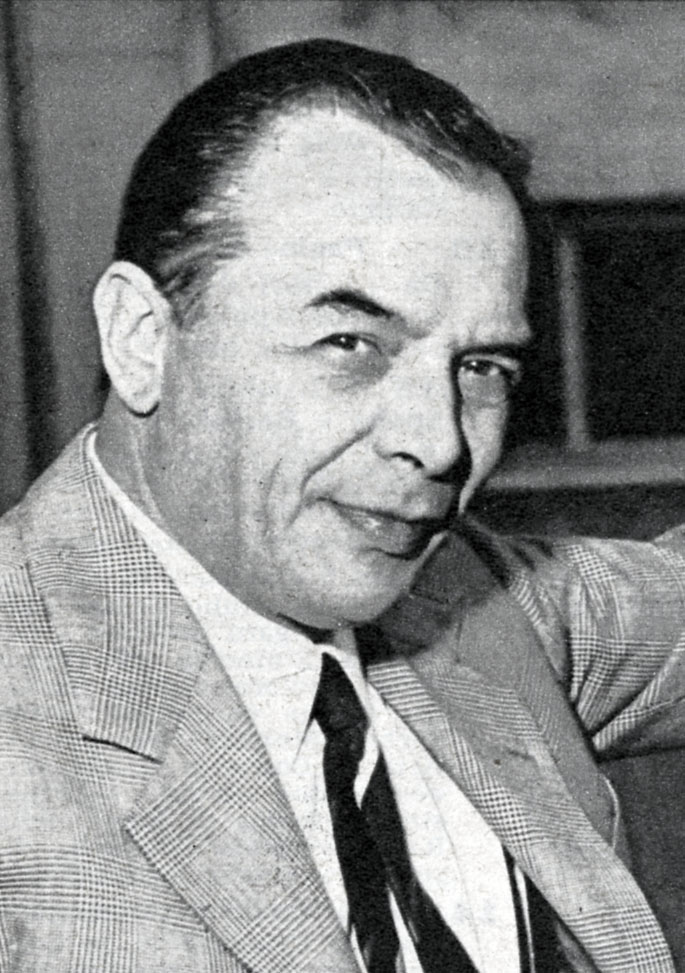
- Tino Carraro in 1963
- Born: Agostino Carraro; 1 December 1910; Milan, Italy
- Died: 12 January 1995 (aged 84); Milan, Italy

Agostino Carraro (1 December 1910 – 12 January 1995) was an Italian stage, television and film actor.

== Life and career ==
Born in Milan, Carraro started acting at young age in several amateur stage companies. Carraro then graduated at the Accademia dei filodrammatici, and in 1941 he got his first personal critical success with his performance in an adaptation of Anna Karenina. In 1952 he made his film debut, in the Duilio Coletti's war film I sette dell'Orsa Maggiore. The same year, Carraro became first actor at the Piccolo Teatro in Milan, starting a long and critically appreciated collaboration with the director Giorgio Strehler. Carraro is also well known for his television work, which include some very successful RAI miniseries, particularly Sandro Bolchi's Il Mulino del Po, I Miserabili and I promessi sposi and Vittorio Cottafavi's A come Andromeda.

== Partial filmography ==
- Falsehood (1952) - Fabrizio
- Hell Raiders of the Deep (1953) - Commander
- I quattro del getto tonante (1955) - Colonnello
- A Qualcuna Piace Calvo (1960) - John Bryll
- Constantine and the Cross (1961) - Emperor Maximianus
- Day by Day, Desperately (1961) - Pietro
- Imperial Venus (1962) - Canova
- The Terrorist (1963) - Smith De Ceva
- Our Men in Bagdad (1966)
- The Vatican Affair (1968) - Il maggiordomo
- Orgasmo (1969) - Brion Sanders
- The Lady of Monza (1969) - Monsignor Barrea
- La Faute de l'abbé Mouret (1970) - Dr. Pascal
- The Cat o' Nine Tails (1971) - Prof. Fulvio Terzi
- The Beasts (1971) - The Minister (segment "La voce del sangue")
- Story of a Cloistered Nun (1973) - Father of Carmela
- Lovers and Other Relatives (1974) - Giustino Bellotto
- Zig-Zag (1975) - Le ministre
- Vergine e di nome Maria (1975) - Il vescovo
- Illustrious Corpses (1976) - Chief of Police
- Werewolf Woman (1976) - Count Neseri
- Per amore (1976) - Alberto's Father
- Italian Night (1987) - Ettore Melandri (final film role)
