= Claudio Gora =

Italian film actor and director (1913–1998)

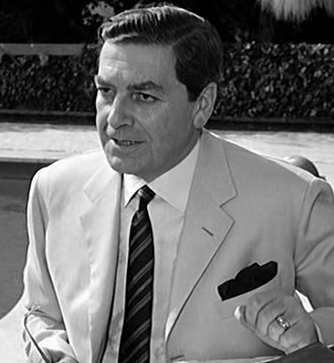
- Gora in A Difficult Life (1961)
- Born: 27 July 1913; Genoa, Italy
- Died: 13 March 1998 (aged 84); Rome, Italy
- Years active: 1939–1997

Emilio Giordana (27 July 1913 – 13 March 1998), known professionally as Claudio Gora, was an Italian actor and film director.

He made some 155 appearances in film and television over nearly 60 years, from 1939 to 1997. He directed the film Three Strangers in Rome in 1958 which was the first leading role by Claudia Cardinale. His notable roles include Adua e le compagne, directed by Antonio Pietrangeli, Tutti a casa by Luigi Comencini, and Dino Risi's A Difficult Life and Il Sorpasso.

== Selected filmography ==
- Torna, caro ideal! (1939) - Francesco Paolo Tosti
- Wealth Without a Future (1940) - Giovanni Di Cora
- Love Trap (1940) - Il fidanzato della segretaria
- Il Bazar delle idee (1940)
- Love Me, Alfredo! (1940) - Il compositore Giacomo Varni
- Eternal Melodies (1940) - L'imperatore Giuseppe
- Amore imperiale (1941) - Alessio Romowski
- A Woman Has Fallen (1941) - Mario
- Document Z-3 (1942) - Paolo Sullich
- Fourth Page (1942) - Claudio, l'avvocato
- Signorinette (1942) - Marco Lancia, lo scrittore
- Dove andiamo, signora? (1942) - Rudi Lindt, conte di Lerchmann
- Mater dolorosa (1943) - Giorgio della Valle
- L'amico delle donne (1943) - Il conte De Simerose
- La storia di una capinera (1943) - Nino Valentini
- National Velvet (1944) - Andrea
- Squadriglia Bianca (1944) - Alessandro, il pilota istruttore
- Resurrection (1944) - Dimitri Neklindoff
- Il fiore sotto gli occhi (1944) - Silvio Aroca
- No Turning Back (1945) - Andrea
- The Ten Commandments (1945) - (segment "Non dire falsa testimonianza")
- Il fabbro del convento (1945) - Des Measures
- I Met You in Naples (1946)
- The Models of Margutta (1946) - Andrea Saveri
- Trepidazione (1946)
- Fatal Symphony (1947)
- Preludio d'amore (1947) - Giovanni
- The Charterhouse of Parma (1948) - Le marquis Crescenzi
- Veglia nella notte (1948)
- L'isola di Montecristo (1948) - Dott. Paolo Fabbri
- I contrabbandieri del mare (1948) - Petropoulos
- The Enchanting Enemy (1953)
- Finishing School (1953) - Professor Charpentier
- Marie Antoinette Queen of France (1956) - Kreutz
- Il canto dell'emigrante (1956) - Il giudice
- The Goddess of Love (1957) - Armodio
- Tempest (1958) - Ministro di Caterine II
- The Facts of Murder (1959) - Il Marito
- Silver Spoon Set (1960) - Ridolfi
- Adua and Her Friends (1960) - Ercoli
- Via Margutta (1960) - Pippo Contigliani
- Sweet Deceptions (1960) - (scenes deleted)
- Everybody Go Home (1960) - Colonnello
- Love in Rome (1960) - Engineer Curtatoni
- Sword Without a Country (1961) - Duca di Belvarco
- A porte chiuse (1961) - Il presidente del tribunale
- Ghosts of Rome (1961) - Ingegner Tellandi
- Le Pavé de Paris (1961) - Agostino
- Gioventù di notte (1961) - Padre di Marco
- Les hommes veulent vivre (1961) - Rossi
- A Difficult Life (1961) - Commendator Bracci
- Ultimatum alla vita (1962) - Cap. Schneider
- Quattro notti con Alba (1962) - Colonel Spallafredda
- La Poupée (1962) - Guillermo Moren
- The Son of Spartacus (1962) - Crassus - governor of Egypt
- Swordsman of Siena (1962) - Leoni
- Il Sorpasso (1962) - Danilo Borelli 'Bibi'
- Mathias Sandorf (1963) - Procureur
- The Verona Trial (1963) - Cersosimo - Examining Magistrate
- Gidget Goes to Rome (1963) - Alberto
- The Swindlers (1963) - Spianelli (segment "Medico e fidanzata")
- Gibraltar (1964) - General Maxwell
- Il treno del sabato (1964) - Michele Pallante
- Full Hearts and Empty Pockets (1964) - Matarassi
- The Secret of Dr. Mabuse (1964) - Direktor Botani / Dr. Mabuse
- Monsieur (1964) - Danon
- Via Veneto (1964)
- White Voices (1964) - Marchionne
- My Wife (1964) - The Honourable (segment "Eritrea")
- Cover Girls (1964) - Luciano Fraschetti
- Le conseguenze (1964)
- Destination Miami: Objective Murder (1964)
- Uncle Tom's Cabin (1965) - (uncredited)
- I complessi (1965) - The Antique Dealer (segment "Il Complesso della Schiava nubiana")
- Made in Italy (1965) - Bored Diner's Husband (segment "1 'Usi e costumi', episode 1")
- The Tramplers (1965) - Fred Wickett
- An Angel for Satan (1966) - Conte Montebruno
- Our Husbands (1966) - The Doctor at the Hospital (segment "Il Marito di Roberta")
- The Saint Lies in Wait (1966) - Cesare Pavone
- Gli amori di Angelica (1966)
- The Hellbenders (1967) - Reverend Pierce
- The Million Dollar Countdown (1967) - Proprietario del Yacht
- John the Bastard (1967) - Don Diego Tenorio
- Danger: Diabolik (1968) - Police Chief
- Be Sick... It's Free (1968) - The Primary
- L'età del malessere (1968)
- Catch As Catch Can (1968) - Cabinet Minister
- Temptation (1969) - Cesare Veraldi
- Zingara (1969) - Camillo Ricci
- The Five Man Army (1969) - Esteban
- Il Prof. Dott. Guido Tersilli, primario della clinica Villa Celeste, convenzionata con le mutue (1969) - Prof. De Amatis
- Dead End (1969) - Montenegro
- Cran d'arrêt (1970) - Le docteur Carrua
- Strogoff (1970) - General Dubelt
- Io non spezzo... rompo (1971) - Frank Mannata
- Confessions of a Police Captain (1971) - District Attorney Malta
- Equinozio (1971) - Il padre di Stefano
- We Are All in Temporary Liberty (1971) - Foreign Office manager
- The Beasts (1971) - Giulio Bianchi (segment "Il caso Apposito")
- Do Not Commit Adultery (1971) - Giacomo
- Seven Blood-Stained Orchids (1972) - Raffaele Ferri
- Shadows Unseen (1972) - District Attorney
- Valerie Inside Outside (1972) - 'Barone'
- Rosina Fumo viene in città... per farsi il corredo (1972) - Father of Francesco
- The Nun and the Devil (1973) - Cardinal d'Arezzo
- Hospitals: The White Mafia (1973) - Prof. Calogeri
- The Great Kidnapping (1973) - Samperi
- Mean Frank and Crazy Tony (1973) - Director of 'Casa del Giovane'
- Provaci anche tu Lionel (1973)
- Buona parte di Paolina (1973)
- Ante Up (1974) - Doctor Ferri
- How to Kill a Judge (1975) - Film Actor Playing State Prosecutor
- Silent Action (1975) - Martinetti
- Section spéciale (1975) - Francis Villette, le premier président de la cour d'appel
- Manhunt in the City (1975) - Attorney Ludovico Mieli
- La guerre du pétrole n'aura pas lieu (1975) - Stockell
- The Flower in His Mouth (1975) - Deputate Cataudella
- The Sunday Woman (1975) - Garrone
- The Net (1975) - Carlo Vanetti
- The Diamond Peddlers (1976) - Mr. Robinson
- Don Milani (1976) - Don Bensi
- A Man Called Magnum (1977) - Don Domenico Laurenzi
- La belva col mitra (1977) - Judge
- The Perfect Crime (1978)
- Lion of the Desert (1980) - President of Court
- I Know That You Know That I Know (1982) - Ronconi
- Count Tacchia (1982) - Duca Savello
- Amok (1983) - M. Horn
- Sono un fenomeno paranormale (1985)
- Piccole stelle (1988)
- Ombre d'amore (1990) - Daniele, l'attore
- Rossini! Rossini! (1991) - Dott. Bardos
- Vacanze di Natale '91 (1991) - Onorevele Mariotti
