= Death Walks in Laredo =

1967 film

- Directed by: Enzo Peri
- Written by: Enzo Peri; Piero Regnoli
- Produced by: Carmine Bologna
- Cinematography: Otello Martelli
- Edited by: Adriana Novelli
- Music by: Marcello Giombini
- Release date: 1967
- Country: Italy

Death Walks in Laredo (Italian: Tre pistole contro Cesare, also known as Three Golden Boys and The Pistol, the Karate and the Eye), is a 1967 Italian Spaghetti Western film directed by Enzo Peri and shot in Algeria. It is also influenced by the Sword-and-sandal film genre.

== Plot ==
Three men are each provided with a part of a map and a photograph from the time when they were children: the American Whitey, the Frenchman Étienne and the Japanese Lester. Their maps lead all of them to the same gold mine. When they meet they figure out they are all sons of the late mine owner Langdon. The land around the mine has been bequeathed to them and the saloon girl Mady whom they recognise as their sister. Nonetheless, their heritage is under the sway of megalomaniac gangster boss Fuller, who dresses in toga and lives in a Roman-style palace with local women performing erotic dances. As a team they must fight him and his gang of thugs (who do wear Western outfit).

== Cast ==
- Thomas Hunter: Whitey Selby
- James Shigeta: Lester Koto
- Nadir Moretti: Étienne Devereaux
- Enrico Maria Salerno: Giulio Cesare Fuller
- Delia Boccardo: Mady
- Gianna Serra: Debbie
- Femi Benussi: Tula
- Umberto D'Orsi: Bronson
- Ferruccio De Ceresa: Professor
