= A Man Called Magnum =

- Film poster
- Directed by: Michele Massimo Tarantini
- Written by: Dardano Sacchetti
- Produced by: Luciano Martino
- Starring: Luc Merenda
- Cinematography: Sergio Rubini
- Edited by: Alberto Moriani
- Music by: Franco Campanino
- Distributed by: Titanus
- Release date: 1977
- Running time: 101 mins
- Country: Italy
- Language: Italian

A Man Called Magnum (Italian: Napoli si ribella, lit. 'Naples rises up') is a 1977 poliziotteschi film directed by Michele Massimo Tarantini and starring Luc Merenda.

== Cast ==
- Luc Merenda as Police Commissioner Dario Mauri
- Enzo Cannavale as Maresciallo Nicola Capece
- Adolfo Lastretti as Pasquale Donnaregina
- Ferdinando Murolo as Antonio Bonino
- Marianne Comtell as Carola
- Claudio Gora as Don Domenico Laurenzi
- Sonia Viviani as Rosa
- Giancarlo Badessi as Lawyer Cerullo
- Mattia Machiavelli as the Sheikh
- Francesca Guadagno as Luisa
- Nello Pazzafini as Camorra man

== Production ==
The film was produced by Dania Film; it was shot between Naples and the De Paolis studios in Rome.

== Releases ==
The film was released theatrically by Titanus on 8 July 1977. It was released on Region 1 DVD by NoShame films in 2006.

== Reception ==
Italian film historian Roberto Curti described the film as "perhaps the missing link between the harsh, violent climate of poliziotteschi [...] and the warmer sceneggiata" and "a compelling late entry in the genre". It was a box office success, grossing about one billion lire.
