= Vittorio Storaro filmography =

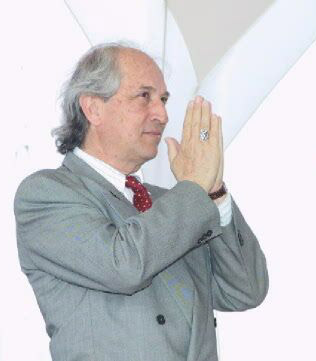
Vittorio Storaro at Cannes in 2001

Vittorio Storaro is an Italian cinematographer, and member of the American Society of Cinematographers (ASC) and Italian Society of Cinematographers (AIC). Storaro's early films were made in his homeland of Italy, where he began early collaborations with Italian director Bernardo Bertolucci, with whom he has continued to collaborate with throughout his career. Storaro and Bertolucci's first major project was the 1970 film The Conformist, based on the Italian novel of the same name.

Storaro's first American film was Apocalypse Now, directed by Francis Ford Coppola. Storaro won an Academy Award for his work on the film, followed by two more Oscars for his work on Reds and The Last Emperor, and a nomination for Dick Tracy. Storaro also acted as cinematographer on films such as Last Tango in Paris, Ishtar, Bulworth, and Exorcist: The Beginning. In addition to Bertolucci and Coppola, Storaro has worked with directors such as Richard Donner, Warren Beatty, and Carlos Saura. Throughout his career, Storaro has been nominated for and won many awards for his work as a cinematographer, including a Lifetime Achievement Award from the American Society of Cinematographers.

== Short film ==
Year	Title	Director	Notes
1961	Etruscologia	Giancarlo Romitelli	
1963	Un Delitto	Luigi Bazzoni	
1966	L'urlo	Camillo Bazzoni	Also writer
1966	Rapporto segreto	Camillo Bazzoni	
1966	Il Labirinto	Silvio Maestranzi	Documentary short
1966	Sortilegio	Luigi Bazzoni	
1966	Sirtaki	Luigi Bazzoni	
1982	Arlecchino	Giuliano Montaldo	
1989	Life without Zoe	Francis Ford Coppola	Segment of New York Stories
2005	Ciro	Stefano Veneruso	Segment of All the Invisible Children

== Feature film ==
Year	Title	Director	Notes
1962	Attack of the Normans	Giuseppe Vari	With Marco Scarpelli
1969	Youth March	Franco Rossi	
1969	Delitto al circolo del tennis	Franco Rossetti	
1970	The Bird with the Crystal Plumage	Dario Argento	
1970	The Conformist	Bernardo Bertolucci	
1970	The Spider's Stratagem	Bernardo Bertolucci	With Franco Di Giacomo
1971	The Fifth Cord	Luigi Bazzoni	
1971	'Tis Pity She's a Whore	Giuseppe Patroni Griffi	
1972	Last Tango in Paris	Bernardo Bertolucci	
1973	Malicious	Salvatore Samperi	
1973	Brothers Blue	Luigi Bazzoni	
1973	Corpo d'amore	Fabio Carpi	
1973	Giordano Bruno	Giuliano Montaldo	
1974	The Driver's Seat	Giuseppe Patroni Griffi	
1975	Footprints on the Moon	Luigi Bazzoni; Mario Fanelli	
1976	1900	Bernardo Bertolucci	
1976	Submission	Salvatore Samperi	
1979	Agatha	Michael Apted	
1979	Apocalypse Now	Francis Ford Coppola	
1979	Luna	Bernardo Bertolucci	
1981	Reds	Warren Beatty	
1982	One from the Heart	Francis Ford Coppola	With Ronald Víctor García
1985	Ladyhawke	Richard Donner	
1987	Ishtar	Elaine May	
1987	The Last Emperor	Bernardo Bertolucci	
1988	Tucker: The Man and His Dream	Francis Ford Coppola	
1990	Dick Tracy	Warren Beatty	
1990	The Sheltering Sky	Bernardo Bertolucci	
1992	Tosca	Brian Large	
1993	Little Buddha	Bernardo Bertolucci	
1996	Taxi	Carlos Saura	
1998	Bulworth	Warren Beatty	
1998	Tango	Carlos Saura	
1999	Goya in Bordeaux	Carlos Saura	
2000	Mirka	Rachid Benhadj	
2000	Picking Up the Pieces	Alfonso Arau	
2004	Zapata: el sueño del héroe	Alfonso Arau	
2004	Exorcist: The Beginning	Renny Harlin	
2005	Dominion: Prequel to the Exorcist	Paul Schrader	
2008	The Trick in the Sheet	Alfonso Arau	
2009	I, Don Giovanni	Carlos Saura	
2010	The Trick in the Sheet	Alfonso Arau	
2012	Parfums d'Alger	Rachid Benhadj	
2015	Muhammad: The Messenger of God	Majid Majidi	
2016	Café Society	Woody Allen	
2017	Wonder Wheel	Woody Allen	
2018	A Rose in Winter	Joshua Sinclair	
2019	A Rainy Day in New York	Woody Allen	
2020	Rifkin's Festival	Woody Allen	
2021	The King of All the World	Carlos Saura	
2023	Coup de chance	Woody Allen	

Documentary film

Year	Title	Director
1994	Roma imago urbis	Luigi Bazzoni
1995	Flamenco	Carlos Saura
2010	Flamenco, Flamenco	Carlos Saura

== Television ==
Year	Title	Director
1971	Eneide	Franco Rossi

Miniseries

Year	Title	Director	Notes
1974	Orlando Furioso	Luca Ronconi	With Arturo Zavattini
1983	Wagner	Tony Palmer	
1986	Peter the Great	Marvin J. Chomsky; Lawrence Schiller	
2000	Frank Herbert's Dune	John Harrison	
2007	Caravaggio	Angelo Longoni	

TV movies

Year	Title	Director	Notes
1992	Tosca: In the Settings and at the Times of Tosca	Brian Large	
1992	Writing with Light: Vittorio Storaro	David M. Thompson	Documentary film
2000	La traviata	Pierre Cavassilas	
2010	Rigoletto a Mantova	Pierre Cavassilas	
