= Elodie Harper =

English author and journalist

- Born: Elodie Lauren Geraldine Harper
- Education: Corpus Christi College, Oxford
- Occupations: Author and journalist
- Spouse: Jason Farrington (m. 2010)
- Children: 1
- Mother: Suzy Kendall
- Website: www.elodieharper.com

Elodie Lauren Geraldine Harper is an English author and journalist. She began her career working for the BBC and Channel 4 News before joining ITV News Anglia as a reporter. Her Pompeii-set novel The Wolf Den (2021), the first in a trilogy, became a No. 1 Sunday Times bestseller.

== Early life ==
Harper is from West London, the daughter of retired actress Suzy Kendall. Harper attended Francis Holland School. She graduated from Corpus Christi College, Oxford, with a degree in English literature.

== Career ==
Harper presented a number of documentaries for the BBC, including a July 2006 documentary on Volunteer Ministers in Scientology for BBC Radio 5 Live. She then worked as a producer and reporter for Channel 4 News before joining ITV News Anglia in 2010 as a staff reporter.

Harper successfully submitted her short story "Wild Swimming" to Stephen King's Bazaar of Bad Dreams short story competition. The winning story then featured in King's 2016 anthology Six Scary Stories. That March, Harper signed a two-book deal with Mulholland Books for the publication of her debut novel, The Binding Song, a thriller setmagazine at the fictional HMP Halvergate in Norfolk, in 2017. This was followed by her second crime novel, The Death Knock, in 2018. However, she felt her first two novels, set in the "Norfolk Noir" genre, were too close to her day job, motivating her to go into historical fiction.

Historian Dan Jones introduced Harper to Head of Zeus (a Bloomsbury Books imprint), through which Harper published her first historical fiction, The Wolf Den, in May 2021. Set in ancient Pompeii, the novel follows Amara, a young woman enslaved in the city's Lupanar. She cited Robert Knapp's Invisible Romans, Mary Beard's Pompeii, and Alison Cooley's Pompeii and Herculaneum as some of her sources when conducting research for the novel. The Wolf's Den debuted at No. 1 on The Sunday Times paperback fiction list, won the Goldsboro Books Glass Bell Award, and was shortlisted for Page Turner of the Year at the 2022 British Book Awards. It was also longlisted for the Historical Writers' Association's (HWA) Gold Crown Award. This was followed in 2022 by a sequel entitled The House with the Golden Door, which entered the top 10 on the bestseller list. The third and final instalment, The Temple of Fortuna, was published in 2023. Antonia Senior of The Times called it "one of the best historical fiction trilogies" since Hilary Mantel's Wolf Hall.

In 2022, it was confirmed that Harper would reunite with Head of Zeus for her next two novels: Boudicca's Daughter and an untitled novel about Fulvia, Mark Antony's wife. Boudicca's Daughter was named one of the best historical fiction books of 2025 by The Sunday Times. In 2024, Harper signed her first children's book deal with DK Children for a middle-grade trilogy.

== Personal life ==
Harper married Jason Farrington in 2010. They divorced in 2020.

== Bibliography ==
=== Wolf Den trilogy ===
- The Wolf Den (2021)
- The House with the Golden Door (2022)
- The Temple of Fortuna (2023)

=== Standalones ===
- The Binding Song (2017)
- The Death Knock (2018)
- Boudicca's Daughter (2025)
- Untitled Fulvia novel (2026)

=== Short stories ===
- "Wild Swimming" in Six Scary Stories (2016), edited by Stephen King

== Accolades ==
Year	Award	Category	Title	Result	Ref.
2022	British Book Awards	Page Turner of the Year	The Wolf Den	Shortlisted	
2022	Goldsboro Books Glass Bell Award		The Wolf Den	Won	
2022	Historical Writers' Association	Gold Crown	The Wolf Den	Longlisted	
2026	Wilbur Smith Adventure Writing Prize		Boudicca's Daughter	Pending	
