= Arizona Colt Returns =

1970 film

- Italian theatrical release poster
- Directed by: Sergio Martino
- Screenplay by: Joaquin Romero Fernandez
- Story by: Ernesto Gastaldi
- Starring: Anthony Steffen; Marcella Michelangeli; Aldo Sanbrell
- Cinematography: Miguel F. Mila
- Edited by: Michele Massimo Tarantini
- Music by: Bruno Nicolai
- Production companies: Devon Film; Astro
- Distributed by: Interfilm (Italy)
- Release date: 1970
- Countries: Italy; Spain

Arizona Colt Returns (Italian: Arizona si scatenò... e li fece fuori tutti), also known as Arizona is a 1970 Spaghetti Western film directed by Sergio Martino and starring Anthony Steffen. The feature film debut of Martino after a series of documentary films, it is the sequel of Arizona Colt, with Steffen replacing Giuliano Gemma in the title role and with only Roberto Camardiel reprising his role from the previous film.

== Synopsis ==
Famed gunman Arizona Colt is living in near-isolation with his friend Double Whiskey. After learning that he has a bounty on his head he decides to go back to town and square things up. Shortly after faking his own death, Arizona is subsequently asked by the wealthy landlord Moreno to rescue his daughter from the grips of Arizona's old enemy, Keene, who was also responsible for framing Arizona and setting him up for the bounty in the first place. Arizona refuses at first, thinking to settle down with the beautiful bartender Sheena. But after his friend Double Whiskey is captured by Keene, Arizona decides to face the challenge. Nevertheless, certain complications make his mission far more dangerous than expected.

== Cast ==
- Anthony Steffen as Arizona Colt
- Roberto Camardiel as Double Whiskey
- José Manuel Martin as José Gonzalez Moreno
- Aldo Sambrell as Keene/Keane
- Rosalba Neri as Paloma Moreno
- Marcella Michelangeli as Sheila/Sheena/Jane
- Raffaele Baldassarre as Bigley
- Carlos Romero Marchent as Jack
- Silvio Bagolini as The Doctor
- Emilio Delle Piane as Marshal
- Gildo Di Marco as Filthy Bottle
- Florentino Alonso as Boy
- Silvio Bagolini as Doctor
- Luis Barboo as Scarface

== Release ==
Arizona Colt Returns was released in 1970.

== See also ==
- List of Italian films of 1970
