= Six Scary Stories =

Horror anthology

- First edition cover
- Author: Various
- Cover artist: Vincent Chong
- Language: English
- Genre: Horror fiction
- Publisher: Cemetery Dance Publications
- Publication date: October 31, 2016
- Publication place: United States
- Media type: Print (hardcover)
- Pages: 125
- ISBN: 978-1587675713

Six Scary Stories is a horror anthology edited by Stephen King published by Cemetery Dance Publications on August 25, 2016. A hardcover edition followed on October 31.

== Conception ==
The stories were selected by King from those submitted in a contest he judged, sponsored by The Guardian and Hodder & Stoughton.

== Stories ==
- "Wild Swimming" by Elodie Harper
- "Eau-de-Eric" by Manuela Saragosa
- "The Spots" by Paul Bassett Davies
- "The Unpicking" by Michael Button
- "La Mort de l'amant" by Stuart Johnstone
- "The Bear Trap" by Neil Hudson
