= Luc Merenda =

French film actor (b. 1943)

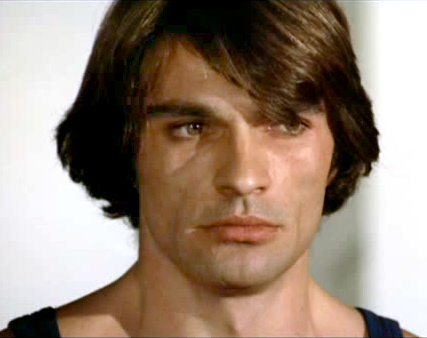
- Merenda in Shoot First, Die Later (1974)
- Born: Luc Charles Olivier Merenda; 3 September 1943 (age 83); Nogent-le-Roi, Eure-et-Loir, France
- Education: Columbia University
- Occupations: Actor, model, antiquarian
- Years active: 1970–present

Luc Charles Olivier Merenda (born 3 September 1943) is a French actor and former model, known as was one of the most prominent leading men of Italian poliziotteschi films during the 1970s.

== Early life ==
Merenda was born in Nogent-le-Roi, a small town in the department of Eure-et-Loir, near Paris. His paternal grandfather was Italian. He was raised in Paris and Agadir, French Morocco, due to his parents' work. Throughout his teenage years, he was an avid savateur, motorcyclist, and skydiver.

At age 24, Merenda moved to New York City to attend Columbia University. While supporting himself as a waiter, he took up modeling, which eventually earned him enough publicity to begin his acting career in his native France.

== Career ==
Merenda’s film debut was a supporting role in Brazilian filmmaker Walter Hugo Khouri’s drama The Palace of Angels. He was subsequently cast as secret agent Hubert Bonisseur de La Bath in the popular OSS 117 series. He starred in OSS 117 Takes a Vacation, becoming the fifth actor overall to play the character. Though he was signed to a five-picture deal, the mediocre box office returns led producers to release him from his contract. He subsequently played supporting roles in Law Breakers, Red Sun, and the Hollywood film Le Mans (all in 1971).

In 1971, Merenda was spotted by a casting director while vacationing in Rome. The director convinced Merenda to appear in a series of photo comics, which caught the attention of Italian producers and led him to be cast in his first starring role in a feature film - the Spaghetti Western Man Called Amen. He has a significant breakthrough working with producer Carlo Ponti and director Sergio Martino in 1973, first as a co-lead in the giallo Torso, and then as the lead in The Violent Professionals. The latter was a major hit of the poliziottesco genre and made Merenda a superstar overnight.

He subsequently played similar, morally-gray cop characters in films like Shoot First, Die Later, Silent Action, Kidnap Syndicate, and Nick the Sting, directed by the likes of Martino and Fernando Di Leo. Other films he appeared in during this time included a nunsploitation film, The Nun and the Devil, and another giallo, Puzzle.

In 1980, Metenda played a leading role in Tinto Brass’ avant-garde comedy Action. However, with the downturn of poliziotteschi and the Italian film industry as a whole in the 1980’s, Merenda’s work became gradually more and more sporadic. In 1985, he returned to France to play one of the lead roles in the TV series Châteauvallon. The series was a great success, but it was not renewed after lead actress Chantal Nobel was the victim of a car accident. In 1986, Merenda appeared in the Italian comedy Superfantozzi, where he played several different characters . One of his last major roles was as General José Borjes in the period film 'O Re (1989). After this, he retired from acting, though he made a cameo appearance in the 2007 American horror film Hostel: Part II, playing an Italian detective in homage to his B-movie roles.

In 2022, nearly 15 years after his last role, Merenda made a surprise return to acting when he dubbed the voice of Vincent Martin for the Italian-language dub of Mrs. Harris Goes to Paris. He subsequently announced a return to film acting. He starred in the 2023 film Il paese del melodramma.

== Personal life ==
In 1979, Merenda married Italian journalist Germana Monteverdi, from whom he divorced ten years later. He later remarried, to Annie Minet.

Since retiring from acting, Merenda has worked as an antiquarian. Specializing in Asian art, he runs a store at Marché Biron in Saint-Ouen-sur-Seine and a gallery in Thoiry, Yvelines.

Merenda is fluent in both French and Italian, and speaks conversational English.

== Partial filmography ==
- The Palace of Angels (1970) - Ricardo
- OSS 117 Takes a Vacation (1970) - Hubert Bonisseur de La Bath, alias OSS 117
- Les Assassins de l'ordre (1971) - Marco
- Le Mans (1971) - Claude Aurac
- Red Sun (1971) - Chato
- Man Called Amen (1972) - Così Sia / Amen
- D'amore si muore (1972) - Enzo
- Torso (1973) - Roberto
- The Nun and the Devil (1973) - Carafo
- The Violent Professionals (1973) - Giorgio Martini
- Mamma mia è arrivato così sia (1973) - Così Sia / Amen
- Oremus, Alleluia e Così Sia (1973) - Cosi' Sia / Amen
- The Off-Road Girl (1973) - Giorgio Martini
- Shoot First, Die Later (1974) - Domenico Malacarne
- Puzzle (1974) - Edward
- Gambling City (1975) - Luca Altieri
- Silent Action (1975) - Inspector Giorgio Solmi
- Kidnap Syndicate (1975) - Mario Colella
- Nick the Sting (1976) - Nick Hezard
- Evil Thoughts (1976) - Jean-Luc Retrosi
- The Last Round (1976) - Rico Manzetti
- Destruction Force (1977) - Commissario Ghini
- A Man Called Magnum (1977) - Commissario Dario Mauri
- Could It Happen Here? (1977) - Ferruccio
- Hotel Fear (1977) - Rodolfo
- Tough to Kill (1978) - Keaton
- Deadly Chase (1978) - Commissario Verrazzano
- Target (1979) - Martin
- Action (1980) - Bruno Martel
- Love in First Class (1980) - Il poliziotto
- Il ficcanaso (1980) - Paolo
- Honey (1981) - El hombre de la habitación
- Teste di quoio (1981) - Maniaco (uncredited)
- Pover'ammore (1982)
- Occhio nero, occhio biondo e occhio felino (1983)
- Superfantozzi (1986) - Various Characters
- Missione eroica - I pompieri 2 (1987) - McFarland
- 'O Re (1988) - José Borjes
- Hostel: Part II (2007) - Italian Detective
- Il paese del melodramma (2023) - Death
- Buio come il cuore (2024) - Andrea Conti

== Television ==
- The Black Adder (1983) as The Witchsmeller (French dub)
- Nonni and Manni (1988–1989)
