= Delia Boccardo =

Italian actress (born 1948)

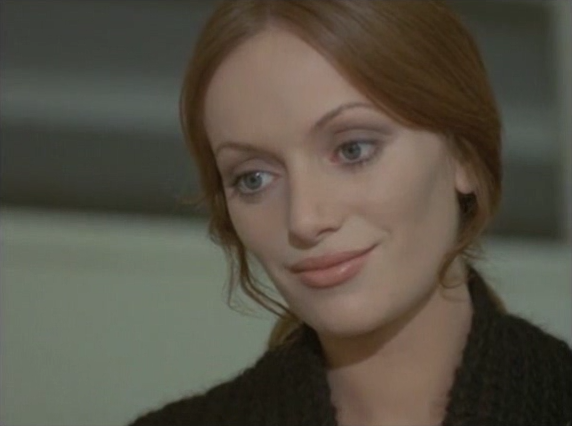
- Boccardo in Between Miracles (1971)
- Born: 29 January 1948 (age 78); Genoa, Italy
- Occupation: Actress

Delia Boccardo (born 29 January 1948) is an Italian film, television and stage actress.

== Life and career ==
Born in Genoa, Boccardo spent her childhood and adolescence in Nervi, then studied at a Swiss college, at the Poggio Imperiale girls' school and, for about three years, at a college in Sussex, England. In 1965 she moved to Rome where she attended the Centro Sperimentale di Cinematografia.

Boccardo made her film debut in 1966, in the Spaghetti Western Death Walks in Laredo; she made her stage debut in 1967, alongside Raf Vallone in Uno sguardo dal ponte. From the mid-1980s she focused her appearances on stage, where she worked intensively with Luca Ronconi, and on television.

== Partial filmography ==
- Death Walks in Laredo (1966) - Mady
- The Wild Eye (1967) - Barbara Bates
- Inspector Clouseau (1968) - Lisa Morrel
- Rose Spot (1969) - Livia
- Detective Belli (1969) - Sandy Bronson
- The Year of the Cannibals (1969) - Ismene
- The Adventurers (1970) - Caroline de Coyne
- Strogoff (1970) - Sangarre
- Between Miracles (1971) - Giovanna Visciani
- Equinozio (1971) - Anna / Una ragazza in riva al mare
- Stress (1971)
- Snow Job (1972) - Lorraine Borman
- Panhandle 38 (1972) - Connie Briscott
- High Crime (1973) - Mirella
- Massacre in Rome (1973) - Elena
- Shoot First, Die Later (1974) - Sandra
- A Black Ribbon for Deborah (1974) - Mira Wener
- La mazurka del barone, della santa e del fico fiorone (1975) - Redheaded prostitute / The 'saint'
- The Last Day of School Before Christmas (1975) - Germana
- Silent Action (1975) - Maria
- Il caso Raoul (1975) - Delia
- Giovannino (1976)
- A Woman at Her Window (1976) - Dora Cooper
- Tentacles (1977) - Vicky Gleason
- Improvviso (1979) - La Tedesca
- Martin Eden (1979) - Ruth Morse
- The Day Christ Died (1980, TV Movie) - Mary Magdelene
- Roma dalla finestra (1982) - Olga
- Aphrodite (1982) - Barbara
- Nostalghia (1983) - Domenico's Wife
- Hercules (1983) - Athena
- The Assisi Underground (1985) - Countess Cristina
- Blood Ties (1986, TV Movie) - Sara Salina
- The Secret of the Sahara (1987, TV Mini-Series) - Yasmine
- Sposi (1988) - Assunta
- Cavalli si nasce (1989) - Baroness
- L'isola alla deriva (1989) - Madamoiselle
- The Week of the Sphinx (1990) - Sara
- Il nodo alla cravatta (1991)
- The Return of Casanova (1992) - Amelie
- Declarations of Love (1994) - Adult Sandra
- Fade out (Dissolvenza al nero) (1994)
- Questo è il giardino (1999) - Carlo's mother
- Empty Eyes (2001) - Marco's Mother
- Virginia, la monaca di Monza (2004, TV Movie) - Virginia's mother
