= Puzzle (1974 film) =

- Italian film poster
- Directed by: Duccio Tessari
- Screenplay by: Bruno Di Geronimo; Duccio Tessari; Ernesto Gastaldi
- Story by: Roberto Infascelli
- Produced by: Luciano Martino
- Starring: Senta Berger; Luc Merenda; Umberto Orsini; Bruno Corazzari; Anita Strindberg; Rosario Borelli; Duilio Cruciani
- Cinematography: Giulio Albonico
- Edited by: Mario Morra
- Music by: Gianni Ferrio
- Production company: Dania Film
- Distributed by: Titanus
- Release date: 1974
- Running time: 92 minutes
- Country: Italy
- Language: Italian

L’uomo senza memoria (translation: The Man Without a Memory), internationally released as Puzzle, is a 1974 Italian giallo film directed by Duccio Tessari. It was written by Ernesto Gastaldi. La Stampa defined the film as "full of ideas and with a strong storyline".

== Plot ==
A man named "Smith", who has lost his memory, receives a telegram from his fiancée inviting him to Portofino after a year’s absence. When he arrives, he discovers that his real name is "Ted"—and that his fiancée knew nothing about the telegram. Clearly, someone else has arranged the meeting.

Soon after, a man named "George" reveals to them that Ted is in possession of seven kilos of heroin worth a million dollars. Unless the drugs or the money are handed over within a week, both Ted and George will be killed. After repeated threats, Ted and his fiancée Sarah decide to flee to Paris. But during a farewell party with Ted’s friend, Dr. Reinhart, Sarah breaks her leg in an car accident. Reinhart sets her leg in a cast, forcing her to remain at home.

While Sarah is recuperating, George sends her a message demanding that Ted meet him with the drugs in an abandoned villa. At the meeting, George realizes Ted still remembers nothing. Convinced they are both doomed, he tries to kill Ted in revenge—but is himself killed. Moments later, a third man strikes Ted unconscious and imprisons him.

Meanwhile, a series of coincidences makes Sarah suspicious of her cast. When she cuts it open, she discovers the heroin hidden inside and realizes the “accident” was staged as a cover to transport the drugs—without her or Ted ever knowing. At that moment, Reinhart returns home, sees that Sarah has uncovered the truth, and tries to kill her. In the struggle, Ted—having escaped captivity—arrives, and Reinhart is killed in the confrontation. In the end, Ted turns himself in to the police, despite Sarah’s desperate attempt to clear his name.

== Cast ==
- Luc Merenda as Ted Walden
- Senta Berger as Sara Grimaldi
- Umberto Orsini as Daniele Landi
- Anita Strindberg as Mary Caine
- Bruno Corazzari as George
- Rosario Borelli as Poliziotto
- Manfred Freyberger as Philip
- Tom Felleghy as Dr. Archibald T. Wildgate
