= Luis Bacalov =

Argentine-born composer (1933-2017)

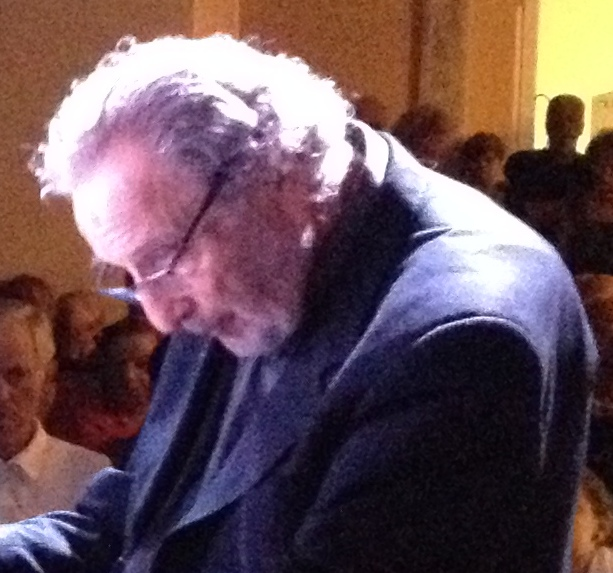
- Bacalov in 2014
- Born: Luis Enríquez Bacalov; 30 August 1933; Buenos Aires, Argentina
- Died: 15 November 2017 (aged 84); Rome, Italy
- Occupation: Film score composer

Luis Enríquez Bacalov (30 August 1933 – 15 November 2017) was an Argentine (naturalized Italian) film composer and musical director. He learned music from Enrique Barenboim, father of Daniel Barenboim - conductor of the Berlin and Chicago orchestras, and from Berta Sujovolsky. He ventured into music for the cinema, and composed now-classic scores for many Spaghetti Western films. In the early 1970s he also collaborated with Italian progressive rock band New Trolls. Bacalov was nominated twice for the Academy Award for Best Original Score, winning it in 1996 for Il Postino.

Bacalov also composed significant works for chorus and orchestra. Before his death, he was the artistic director of the Orchestra della Magna Grecia in Taranto, Italy.

== Biography ==
Luis Bacalov was born in Buenos Aires to a family of Bulgarian Jewish origin. He identified as a Jew but did not practice Judaism. His paternal grandparents were Banat Bulgarians who emigrated to Argentina. His film credits include westerns such as Django, A Bullet for the General, and The Grand Duel, and Italian crime films such as Caliber 9, Il Boss and Mister Scarface. He also scored Fellini's City of Women in 1980.

Bacalov was nominated twice for Academy Award for Original Score—music adaptation or treatment— in 1967 for Pasolini's The Gospel According to St. Matthew, and won the award for Il Postino in 1996.

In the early 1970s, he collaborated with Italian progressive rock bands such as New Trolls, on their 1971 album, Concerto grosso per i New Trolls, Osanna, on the band's second album, Preludio Tema Variazioni e Canzona released in 1972, and Il Rovescio della Medaglia for the 1973 release of their third album, Contaminazione.

Bacalov composed significant works for chorus and orchestra, including Misa Tango (1997), a work that set a Spanish-language adaptation of the classic liturgical Mass to the tango rhythms of his native Argentina. The standard Mass text was significantly truncated in accordance with Bacalov's desire that the work appeal to all Abrahamic faiths: Christians, Muslims and Jews. All references to Christ — except for the Lamb of God (Latin: Agnus Dei) — have been deleted. Credo, the third and longest text part of a sung Mass, has been reduced to most of its first strophe and part of the second one: "Credo in unum Deum, ... omnipotentem, factorem cœli et terrae." (" I believe in one God, ... Almighty, Maker of heaven and earth") plus "Amen" at the end. Misa Tango debuted in Rome with Plácido Domingo as solo tenor in 2000 and was later recorded by Deutsche Grammophon with Plácido Domingo (tenor), Ana María Martínez (mezzo-soprano) and Héctor Ulises Passarella (bandoneón). Its first US performance was on 19 May 2002 at Harvard University's Sanders Theatre (William E. Thomas, Music Director).

Bacalov composed Cantones de Nuestro Tiempos (Psalms for our Times: The Cambridge Psalms) (2006), a commissioned work with text from the Psalms of David for baritone and soprano soloists, orchestra and chorus. It had its world premiere in spring 2006, also at Sanders Theatre, performed by the Cambridge Community Chorus (William E. Thomas, Music Director).

Two of his songs, "The Grand Duel (Parte Prima)" and "The Summertime Killer", were used in Quentin Tarantino's film Kill Bill (2003). Tarantino also used three Bacalov songs from the Spaghetti western era in his 2012 movie Django Unchained: "Django" and "La Corsa (2nd Version)" originally from Django (1966), and "Lo Chiamavano King" from His Name Was King.

Bacalov was the first to write a triple-concerto for bandoneón, piano, soprano and symphony orchestra: Tango Music with Symphonic Proportions.

From 2005 to his death, he was the principal director of Orchestra della Magna Grecia in Taranto, southern Italy. He was considered a brilliant pianist throughout his life. He died in Rome from an ischemic stroke on 15 November 2017 at the age of 84.

== Selected filmography ==
- Those Two in the Legion (1962)
- The Empty Canvas (1963)
- A Love and a Farewell (1964)
- The Gospel According to St. Matthew (1964)
- Questa volta parliamo di uomini (1965)
- OSS 77 – Operazione fior di loto (1965)
- Kiss the Other Sheik (1965)
- Django (1966)
- La strega in amore (1966)
- Sugar Colt (1966)
- A Bullet for the General (1966)
- A Rose for Everyone (1967)
- Catch as Catch Can (1967)
- We Still Kill the Old Way (1967)
- Ghosts – Italian Style (1967)
- The Protagonists (1968)
- The Vatican Affair (1968)
- The Black Sheep (1968)
- Appointment in Beirut (1968)
- In the Name of the Father (1969)
- The Price of Power (1969)
- L'amica (1969)
- Lonely Hearts (1970)
- La supertestimone (1971)
- The Big Black Sow (1971)
- The Designated Victim (1971)
- His Name Was King (1971)
- Roma Bene (1971)
- Caliber 9 (1972)
- It Can Be Done Amigo (1972)
- The Grand Duel (1972)
- The Summertime Killer (1972)
- Il Boss (1973)
- The Man Called Noon (1973)
- The Police Serve the Citizens? (1973)
- Stateline Motel (1973)
- Seduction (1973)
- Shoot First, Die Later (1974)
- Loaded Guns (1975)
- Kidnap Syndicate (1975)
- One Man Against the Organization (1975)
- Il lungo viaggio (1975)
- Colpita da improvviso benessere (1976)
- The Sicilian Cross (1976)
- Nick the Sting (1976)
- Mister Scarface (1976)
- The Last Round (1976)
- Blood and Diamonds (1978)
- The Green Jacket (1979)
- City of Women (1980)
- The Girl from Millelire Street (1980)
- Entre Nous (1983)
- The Mask (1988)
- Il Postino: The Postman (1996)
- Stella's Favor (1996)
- The Truce (1997)
- Polish Wedding (1998)
- Milonga (1999)
- Secret of the Andes (1999)
- Children of the Century (1999)
- Almost America (2001)
- Assassination Tango (2002)
- The Dust Factory (2004)
- Hidden Moon (2012)

== Discography ==
=== Studio albums ===
- 1968 We Still Kill the Old Way (Original Motion Picture Soundtrack) (LP; United Artists)
- 1971 Pitturamusica (LP; Generalmusic)
- 1972 Paesaggi (LP; Generalmusic)
- 1973 La Seduzione (LP; Cetra)
- 1975 Desbandes by Gato Barbieri and Luis Bacalov (LP; Vista)
- 1979 Sincretic 1 by Luis Bacalov and Giovanni Tommaso
- 1980 La cité des femmes (LP; Général Music France)
- 1984 Le Juge (CD; Ltd; Music Box Records)
- 1985 Le Transfuge (CD; Ltd; Music Box Records)
- 1985 Django (Original Motion Picture Soundtrack) (Intermezzo, Generalmusic)
- 1986 Quién Sabe? (Original Motion Picture Soundtrack) (Intermezzo, Generalmusic)
- 1992 Il Prezzo del potere (Original Soundtrack) (CD; CAM)
- 1993 Luis Bacalov Plays Nino Rota (CD; CAM)
- 1994 The Postman (Il Postino) (CD; Miramax Records)
- 1994 Anni Ribelli (Original Soundtrack) (CD; CAM)
- 1995 A ciascuno il suo / Una questione d'onore (Original Soundtracks) (CD, RE; Point Records
- 1995 La più grande rapina del west / L'oro dei bravados (Original Soundtracks) (CD, RE, Ltd.; GDM Music)
- 1995 Il grande duello / Si può fare... amigo (Original Soundtracks) (CD; Point Records)
- 1995 Ricatto alla Mala / La polizia è al servizio del cittadino? (Original Soundtracks) (CD; Point Records)
- 1996 Il Vangelo secondo Matteo (Original Soundtrack) (CD, RE, RCA)
- 1997 Concerto Premio Rota 1996' (CD, RM; CAM)
- 1997 La tregua ("The Truce") (Original Motion Picture Soundtrack) (CD; CAM)
- 1999 Milonga (Original Soundtrack) (CD; RCA)
- 2000 Lo chiamavano King... / Monta in sella!! Figlio di... / Partirono preti, tornarono... curati (Original Soundtracks) (CD, RM, Ltd.; Screen Trax)
- 2003 Sugar Colt (Original Motion Picture Soundtrack) (CD; GDM Music)
- 2007 Per amore by Ennio Morricone and Luis Bacalov (Colonna Sonora Originale) (CD, RE, RM; GDM Music)
- 2007 I quattro del pater noster (Original Soundtrack) (CD, R; Verita Note
- 2008 A qualsiasi prezzo (CD; Verita Note)
- 2010 Coup de foudre (CD, Ltd.; Quartet Records)
- 2010 Lo Scatenato / La Pecora / Nera (CD; Verita Note)
- 2010 Summertime Killer (The Complete Original Soundtrack in Full Stereo) (CD, RE, RM, Ltd.; Quartet)

=== Extended plays ===
- 1965 Una questione d'onore (Dischi Ricordi SRL 10-412)
- 1973 The Summertime Killer (Seven Seas Music FM-1044S)
- 2002 In Lounge (Giaguaro Records GRC 005)

=== Singles ===
- "Django" (Franco Migliacci, Robert Mellin, Luis Bacalov) (1966 Django Dischi Parade PRC 5001 – Seven Seas Music HIT-1376; 1967 7", as "Django" / "Django-Thema", Vogue Schallplatten DV 14626)
- "Sugar Colt" (1966 Dischi Parade PRC 5007; 1967 7" Zafiro)
- "A ciascuno il suo" (1967 7" Dischi Parade PRC 5029)
- "Lo scatenato" / "Se chiudi gli occhi" (from Lo scatenato) (1967 7" Dischi Parade PRC 5047)
- "Run and Run Like a Play" / "Country Lovers" (from The Summertime Killers) (1972 7" Delta Italiana ZD 50221)
- "Fandango" (from L'uomo che sfidò l'organizzazione) (1975 7" CBS 3668)
- "Il lungo viaggio" / "Memorie" (from Il lungo viaggio) (1975 7" RCA TBBO 1179)
- "Che ce voj fà / Carrefour (from Colpita da improvviso benessere) (1976 7" RCA TBBO 1187)
- "Che fare?" (1979 7" Generalmusic GMN 5005)
- "A Suitcase Full of Memories" / "Mélodie pour un réve" (from Le jeune marié) (1983 7" Général Music France 801.045)
- "In Lounge" (2002 7" Giaguaro Records)
