= Superfantozzi =

- Directed by: Neri Parenti
- Written by: Alessandro Becivenni, Leonardo Benvenuti, Piero De Bernardi, Neri Parenti, Domenico Saverni, Paolo Villaggio
- Starring: Paolo Villaggio; Liù Bosisio; Gigi Reder
- Music by: Fred Bongusto
- Release date: 1986
- Running time: 92 min.
- Language: Italian

Superfantozzi is an Italian film from 1986. It is the fifth film in the saga of the unlucky clerk Ugo Fantozzi, played by its creator, Paolo Villaggio. This film portrays the "evolution" of Fantozzi in History, from the Creation of the World to a far, science fiction-esque, future.

== Plot ==
Genesis. After creating Heaven, Earth, the seas and the animals, God proceeds to create man, resulting in Ugo Fantozzi. Disappointed with his first attempt, God rests for one day then tries again, thus creating Adam and Eve, and also provides Fantozzi with a woman, his horrible future wife Pina. After Eve seduces Fantozzi into committing the original sin in her place, Fantozzi and Pina are banished from the garden of Eden and condemned to spend eternity as underlings of Adam's and Eve's descendants.

Stone Age. As he struggles with dinosaurs and other prehistoric perils to feed his family (now including daughter Mariangela), Fantozzi meets another human being, his future colleague Filini. He also creates a rudimentary barbell, which will occasionally appear as a sight gag in the episodes to follow.

Ancient Greece. In a recreation of the heroic deeds of Philippides, Fantozzi runs to Athens to report the Greek victory in the Battle of Marathon. However, by the time he has reached Athens after a 42 kilometer race, he can no longer remember the outcome of the battle and must run back to Marathon to refresh his memory.

New Testament. Fantozzi earns a living out of a small market garden by Lake Tiberias. Upon learning that his wealthy uncle Lazarus has died, Fantozzi rejoices and burns down his own house, anticipating a rich inheritance. However his plan is foiled as Jesus resurrects Lazarus. Fantozzi is later mistaken for a convict and crucified on the Golgotha with Jesus and two thieves.

Middle Ages. Fantozzi, now a crusader returning from the Holy Land, falls in love with a beautiful princess, who is promised as bride to the winner of an upcoming tournament. Fantozzi retrieves Excalibur from an enchanted lake, intending to wield it at the tournament, but his jealous wife Pina secretly replaces the sword with a duplicate. As Fantozzi is nearly killed during the final bout of the tournament, Pina gives him back the real Excalibur to save him. Fantozzi is victorious, but refuses the princess' hand as a token of gratitude to his wife.

Fantozzi is later seen as a beggar, who receives a large sum of gold from Robin Hood, who steals from the rich to give to the poor, only to be robbed minutes later, after joyously stating that he is rich, by Robin himself.

French Revolution. King Louis XVI is taken to the gallows to be executed, but the guillotine jams. Sans-culotte Fantozzi thrusts himself against the guillotine in anger, shaking it until it releases and castrates him.

Unification of Italy. On September 20, 1870, Fantozzi moves to Porta Pia in Rome, where a cannonade breaches a wall of his house and a platoon of bersaglieri marches through.

Fantozzi and Filini, now employed at their characteristic mega-company, take part in a regatta on the river Tiber organised by their director the Earl Duke Modestino Balabam. The race turns out to be a disaster of which Fantozzi and Filini are the only survivors: they end up paddling in the sewers leading to the open sea until, in 1912, they are rescued by the Titanic on its doomed maiden voyage.

After the invention of the cinematograph, Fantozzi and family are watching the films of the Lumière brothers. While watching the Arrival of a train, everyone flees the cinema in fear, but Fantozzi stays and laughs at their credulity, only to be run over by a real train tearing through the screen.

World War I. Fantozzi serves as an air observer for the Red Baron. Tasked with carving notches into the fuselage in order to keep the score of his superior officer's aerial victories, he damages the plane to the point that its tail detaches, taking Fantozzi himself down with it.

American Prohibition. The Fantozzi family relocate to the United States, unaware that their unscrupulous landlord is using their apartment as a decoy for his rum-running operations. As the police break into his house during a dragnet, Fantozzi is arrested for smuggling a single bottle of wine and framed for the landlord's entire business.

World War II. Fantozzi is a Japanese pilot who is selected for a kamikaze mission, but ejects before crashing his plane. He flees to the nearest city, which is however revealed to be Hiroshima, seconds before it is hit by an atomic bomb.

1980's. Fantozzi and Filini take unauthorized leave to attend a football match between Italy and Scotland. Their bus comes face-to-face with another one carrying Scottish fandom, resulting in a confrontation in the style of swashbuckler films and the Cavalleria rusticana. Later at the stadium, Fantozzi and Filini end up by mistake among Scottish supporters, whom they try to elude by disguising as traditional Scotsmen. However, Fantozzi's faulty bagpipes spontaneously play Fratelli d'Italia, causing the duo to be discovered and beaten. Real-life journalist Enrico Mentana later reports the incident in the news, thus exposing Fantozzi's scheme to his family and employers.

The future. Fantozzi and family prepare to dine in their technologically advanced apartment, until they are ordered outside by Fantozzi's boss who wants to use the house for a secret encounter with a lover. Fantozzi decides to celebrate in open space anyway, but is hit by an asteroid.

== Cast ==
- Paolo Villaggio as Ugo Fantozzi
- Liù Bosisio as Pina Fantozzi
- Plinio Fernando as Mariangela Fantozzi
- Gigi Reder as Filini
- Luc Merenda as various characters (including Adam, Robin Hood, Louis XVI, the Red Baron and Fantozzi's boss Modestino Balabam), all associated with being the cause of Fantozzi's troubles
- Eva-Lena Lundgren as various characters, all female counterpart to the characters played by Merenda

== Reception ==
A reviewer known as "Yung." of Variety commented that "Thought pics is jumpy and uneven, there are still some funny bits and Villaggio's humiliated little man is a treat of comic gestuality."
