= Strogoff =

- Directed by: Eriprando Visconti
- Written by: Gian Piero Bona; Ladislas Fodor; Albert Kantof; Georges Lautner; Stefano Strucchi
- Based on: Michael Strogoff (novel by Jules Verne)
- Produced by: Artur Brauner; Nicola Domilia; Alfonso Sansone
- Starring: John Phillip Law; Mimsy Farmer; Hiram Keller; Delia Boccardo
- Cinematography: Luigi Kuveiller
- Edited by: Franco Arcalli
- Music by: Teo Usuelli
- Release date: 1970
- Running time: 120 minutes
- Countries: Italy; France; West Germany
- Language: English

Strogoff (French: Michel Strogoff, le courier du tsar; Italian: Michele Strogoff, corriere dello zar; German: Der Kurier des Zaren) is a European adventure film directed in 1970 by Eriprando Visconti. It was an international co-production between Italy, West Germany and France. It is based on Jules Verne's 1876 novel Michael Strogoff reinterpreted through the lens of psychological realism.

== Plot ==
Michael Strogoff, captain of the army of the Tsar Alexander II, is ordered to travel from Moscow to Irkutsk, in eastern Siberia, to inform the Grand Duke Dmitry that the Tartar army is moving to conquer the city. He leaves for Siberia in civilian clothes, in the guise of a horse trader and under the false name of Nikolai Korpanov. At the same time Ivan Ogareff, a Russian ex-colonel, is freed from a prison camp by his lover Sangarre. He joins the insurgent Tartars led by Feofar-Khan and undertakes Strogoff's same journey to learn the purpose of the Tsar's courier's mission.

During the journey Strogoff makes the acquaintance of Nadja Fëdorova, a young Latvian woman who intends to visit her husband Vasilij Fëdor, a military doctor kept in prison in Irkutsk due to his socialist ideals. Believing that he would arouse less suspicion, Strogoff decides to share the journey with her. During a stop in an izba used as a place to rest and change horses, he meets Ogareff, in the uniform of a Russian officer, who aggressively and insolently demands the troika for the sleigh which would rightfully belong to Strogoff. In order not to blow his camouflage, he passively accepts the insults, arousing some suspicion in Nadja.

Arrived at Strogoff's family estate, Michael and Nadja spend a night of love and are awakened in the morning by Svetlana, wife of the sharecropper, who asks Michael about his life as an officer in St. Petersburg. He is forced to confess his true identity but Nadja, feeling deceived, rejects his apologies and sets off alone with the sled. However, she is soon captured by Ogareff and taken to the Tartar camp.

Ogareff learns from one of his companions that the merchant's real name is Strogoff and therefore he is the courier he is looking for; Michael is captured and tortured. Sangarre manages to find his mother, the Countess Marfa; after the Tartars promise not to kill her son, she reveals that their prisoner is indeed Captain Michael Strogoff. Sangarre discovers also the message in his belt containing the information of reinforcements being sent to the Grand Duke. Ogareff keeps his word and does not kill the officer but blinds him by holding a red-hot saber to his eyes; Marfa, unable to bear her own pain, falls dead.

Feofar Khan is undecided whether to move towards Moscow or continue towards Irkutsk but Ogareff believes that the capital is too far away and suggests occupying Irkutsk and capturing the Grand Duke. Meanwhile, Michael wanders blind among the beggars but is found by Nadja, and both join a group of refugees led by a priest who try to escape the war by crossing the Angara; during the journey, Michael regains his sight.

Ogareff, informed by Sangarre that the following day the Grand Duke's troops will leave the city in search of them, arrives in Irkutsk under the false guise of Captain Strogoff and carries out the plan agreed with Feofar Khan. However, Michael meets a squad of Russian soldiers and reveals his identity; he is taken to the army camp and then leads them to block the Tartar army. Feofar Khan attacks the Russian troops anyways, but his cavalry is decimated. What remains of the cavalry, led by Ogareff, is attacked from behind by Strogoff's reinforcements and during the battle Sangarre dies. The intervention of the artillery resolves the battle in favor of the Russians and Strogoff manages to capture Ogareff; the last desperate charge ends in a massacre and he is killed by the Russian soldiers.

== Cast ==
- John Phillip Law: captain Michael Strogoff, the Tsar's courier
- Mimsy Farmer: Nadja Fëdorova
- Hiram Keller: Ivan Ogareff, a former Russian officer
- Delia Boccardo: Sangarre, Ivan's lover
- Kurt Meisel: Feofar Khan, leader of the Tartars
- Elisabeth Bergner: countess Marfa Strogoff, Michael's mother
- Claudio Gora: General Dubelt
- Christian Marin: Harry Blount, an English journalist
- Donato Castellaneta: Alcide Jolivet, a French photographer
- Jacques Maury: captain Alexandre Chélépine
- Jean-Pierre Dorat: Vasilij Fëdor, Nadja's husband
- Herbert Fux: priest
- Enzo Fiermonte: colonel
