= Nick the Sting =

- Directed by: Fernando Di Leo
- Screenplay by: Alberto Silvestri
- Story by: Alberto Silvestri
- Produced by: Ermanno Curti; Rodolfo Putignani
- Starring: Luc Merenda; Lee J. Cobb
- Cinematography: Roberto Gerardi
- Edited by: Amedio Gimomini
- Music by: Luis Enriquez Bacalov
- Production company: Centro Produzioni Cinematografiche Citta di Milano
- Distributed by: Interfilm
- Release date: 29 April 1976 (Italy)
- Running time: 100 minutes
- Country: Italy
- Box office: ₤427.272 million

Nick the Sting (Italian: Gli amici di Nick Hezard) is a 1976 Italian film directed by Fernando Di Leo. It stars Luc Merenda, Lee J. Cobb and Gabriele Ferzetti.

== Cast ==
- Luc Merenda as Nick Hezard
- Lee J. Cobb as Robert Clark
- Gabriele Ferzetti as Maurice
- Luciana Paluzzi as Anna
- Dagmar Lassander as Chantal
- Isabella Biagini as Edy
- Mario Pisu as Phil
- Riccardo Salvino as Mark
- William Berger as Roizman
- Valentina Cortese as Nick's mother
- Giò Stajano as Jeweller Steffen (credited as Gio Staiano)

== Production ==
Nick the Sting was described by Italian film historian and critic Roberto Curti as a "work for hire" for director Fernando Di Leo. The film went into production after finishing Kidnap Syndicate with a screenplay already written by Alberto Silvestri based around the film The Sting. Di Leo commented that film had "quite a good script [...] but it had a couple huge problems: it would cost too much to film as it was written, and badly needed a charismatic lead."

Nick the Sting was shot at Elios Studio in Rome and on location in Geneve. Leo recalled that the film did not have a good production, finding Merenda not up to the task as a lead and the script did not come up as well as it had on paper.

== Release ==
Nick the Sting was distributed theatrically in Italy by Interfilm on 29 April 1976. The film grossed a total of 427,272,200 Italian lire domestically. It was released on DVD in Italy by Raro Video.

== See also ==
- List of Italian films of 1976
