= Silent Action =

- Film poster
- Directed by: Sergio Martino
- Screenplay by: Massimo Felisatti; Fabio Pittorru; Sergio Martino; Gianfranco Couyoumdjian
- Story by: Massimo Felisatti; Fabio Pittorru
- Produced by: Luciano Martino
- Starring: Luc Merenda; Mel Ferrer; Delia Boccardo; Tomas Milian
- Cinematography: Giancarlo Ferrando
- Edited by: Eugenio Alabiso
- Music by: Luciano Michelini
- Production companies: Dania Film; Flora Film; Medusa Distribuzione
- Distributed by: Medusa
- Release date: 5 April 1975 (Italy)
- Running time: 100 minutes
- Country: Italy

Silent Action (Italian: La polizia accusa: il Servizio Segreto uccide, lit. 'The Police Accuse... The Secret Service Kills') is a 1975 Italian poliziottesco film directed by Sergio Martino.

The film's plot alludes to the Golpe Borghese, a failed Italian 1970 coup d'état.

== Plot ==
Three army officials are murdered but made to look as if they committed suicide. After wealthy master electrician Salvatore Chiarotti is found dead, three policemen—Inspector Giorgio Solmi, Lt. Luigi Caprara and Officer De Luca—investigate.

Solmi and Caprara visit retired madam "Baronessa" Isidora Grimani, who has connections to Chiarotti, and when they discover she's running a brothel out of her estate, they offer her immunity for information. They go to interrogate Chiarotti's last visitor, Giuliana Raimondi—AKA "la Tunisina"—only to find she's attempted suicide. At the hospital, they tell her she's the prime suspect and she admits guilt. Solmi grows suspicious of her admission and suspects a blackmail plot, and she eventually admits she saw the true killer.

Caprara and De Luca keep watch over Chiarotti's villa overnight and witness a man break in and attempt to steal tape recordings. The man, Remo Ortolani, is taken into custody and Solmi listens to the recordings, which contain a conversation between the murdered General Stocchi and a lawyer named Rienzi, in which Rienzi invites Stocchi to join him in a plot, to which Stocchi refuses.

Solmi meets with Captain Sperli, who denies that Ortolani is an agent. Ortolani claims Chiarotti was blackmailing someone and he was aware of it, and that he wanted the tapes to acquire blackmail information. However, District Attorney Mannino discovers the tape has now been erased.

Solmi confronts Mrs. Martinetti, the wife of an oil baron, who had connections to Chiarotti. She says she contacted him when she learned her husband was planning to leave her after she had a tryst. Afterward, Mr. Martinetti tells Solmi that Chiarotti sold blackmail tapes on his wife to him, which he then purchased in order to sever ties with her.

Two assailants abduct Raimondi from the hospital and Mannino places the blame on Solmi and his haphazard approach to surveillance. Solmi asks to interrogate Ortolani, but Mannino tells him that he has been released, due to lack of evidence. Solmi, Caprara and De Luca apprehend Ortolani at the airport, and as the trio transport him for interrogation, an assassin on a motorcycle murders Ortolani. After a lengthy pursuit, the man escapes in a car with two other men.

Raimondi's captors say she must confess to killing Chiarotti or die, further bribing her with money and the promise of a short prison term. After trying to seduce one of them, she wrestles his gun from him and shoots him, then contacts Solmi and tells him one of the captors, Massù, killed Chiarotti. Before Solmi can rescue her, she is killed by Massù. Solmi and Caprara deduce that Massù's real identity is Giovanni Andreassi.

Solmi and his men confront Massù at a boxing club, and though he tries to flee, he is assaulted and arrested. Massù confesses that he made it appear that Raimondi killed Chiarotti and then murdered her so she couldn't talk, adding that Chiarotti was killed because he had blackmail material on Martinetti and his wife. Martinetti strongly denies any connection to Massù.

After Massù tells Mannino that his confession was extorted, Mannino says Solmi's team must confront Martinetti and Massù to discover who really killed Raimondi and Chiarotti. When they arrive at Massù's prison, they find he has been killed in a prison riot. Solmi and Mannino discover that a mysterious non-inmate killed Massù, and they go to Martinetti's estate to confront him but are told he has flown to Kuwait. De Luca investigates a bowling alley robbery and is murdered in a hit job intended to kill Solmi.

Solmi's reporter girlfriend, Maria, receives pictures of Stocchi's and Massù's killers together in Germany and Captain Sperli reveals that the killer is a German mercenary named Franz Schmidt. Solmi and Sperli pursue Schmidt, who is about to escape, as he knows the police are arriving. Solmi apprehends Schmidt, but Sperli shoots Schmidt and kills him, claiming he was protecting Solmi. Solmi finds papers in Schmidt's hotel room, including a list of names, Rienzi's among them, and also finds the geographical coordinates of a mountain camp.

Solmi and his men travel to the camp, where paramilitary forces are training, and someone sets fire to secret documents before escaping in a patrol car. Solmi and Caprara pursue him and the fugitive is forced to surrender. The fugitive turns out to be Captain Sperli, and they deduce that Sperli and Rienzi are the same person.

Sperli refuses to reveal the names of the other conspirators and is suspended by the police department and charged with murder, illegal dealing of military weapons and conspiracy to commit crimes. When Caprara transports Sperli for interrogation, Caprara admits he's the traitorous policeman and says he has devised an escape plan for Sperli. However, when Sperli tries to escape, Caprara and other officers murder him on the street. Solmi heads to his car to go speak to Mannino but is killed by a drive-by assassin, as Maria looks on in horror.

== Cast ==
- Luc Merenda as Inspector Giorgio Solmi
- Mel Ferrer as District Attorney Michele Mannino
- Delia Boccardo as Maria
- Tomas Milian as Captain Mario Sperli
- Michele Gammino as Lt. Luigi Caprara
- Paola Tedesco as Giuliana Raimondi (AKA la Tunisina)
- Gianfranco Barra as Officer De Luca
- Carlo Alighiero as Remo Ortolani
- Antonio Casale as Giovanni Andreassi (AKA Massù)
- Gianni Di Benedetto as General Eugenio Stocchi
- Claudio Gora as Martinetti
- Clara Colosimo as "Baronessa" Isidora Grimani
- Arturo Dominici as Chief of Police

== Release ==
Silent Action was distributed theatrically in Italy by Medusa on April 5, 1975.

== See also ==
- List of Italian films of 1975

== Sources ==
- Curti, Roberto (2013). Italian Crime Filmography, 1968-1980. McFarland. ISBN 9780786469765.
