= The Violent Professionals =

1973 film directed by Sergio Martino

- US film poster
- Italian: Milano trema: la polizia vuole giustizia
- Directed by: Sergio Martino
- Written by: Ernesto Gastaldi
- Produced by: Luciano Martino; Carlo Ponti
- Starring: Luc Merenda; Richard Conte; Silvano Tranquilli; Carlo Alighiero; Martine Brochard; Chris Avram
- Cinematography: Giancarlo Ferrando
- Edited by: Eugenio Alabiso
- Music by: Guido De Angelis; Maurizio De Angelis
- Production companies: Dania Film; Compagnia Cinematografica Champion
- Distributed by: Interfilm
- Release date: 22 August 1973 (Italy)
- Running time: 104 minutes
- Country: Italy
- Language: Italian
- Box office: ₤1.162 billion

The Violent Professionals (Italian: Milano trema: la polizia vuole giustizia, lit. 'Milan trembles: the police demand justice') is a 1973 poliziottesco film directed by Sergio Martino and starring Luc Merenda, Richard Conte, Silvano Tranquilli, Chris Avram and Martine Brochard. Merenda plays a Milan cop who goes undercover as a getaway driver for the mob so he can wage a one-man war on crime, to avenge the death of his mentor.

== Cast ==
- Luc Merenda as Inspector Giorgio Caneparo
- Richard Conte as Padulo / Salassolio
- Silvano Tranquilli as Inspector Gianni Viviani
- Carlo Alighiero as Chief Nicastro
- Martine Brochard as Maria
- Chris Avram as Inspector Del Buono
- Steffen Zacharias as Monsùmerda
- Bruno Corazzari as Gori
- Cyrille Spiga as Steiner
- Rosario Borelli as Pepi Cartiglia
- Antonio Casale as Casardi
- Luciano Rossi as Cruciani
- Lia Tanzi as the prostitute

== Production ==
Filming took place on-location in Milan and Novara. It was the first poliziottesco for genre mainstays Sergio Martino and Luc Merenda, who would collaborate on several films throughout the decade.

== Release ==
The Violent Professionals was released in Italy on 22 August 1973 where it was distributed by Interfilm. It was a box office hit in Italy where it grossed a total of 1,162,424,000 Italian lire.

=== Home media ===
The film has been released in an English-language friendly DVD by Wild East and as a double feature from Alpha Video with Deadly Drifter.

The boutique label restored and released the film on Blu-Ray in 2018. British label 88 Films a Blu-Ray in 2021.

== Reception ==
A retrospective review for the website Mondo Digital reads, "One of the most purely enjoyable Italian crime films of the 1970s, The Violent Professionals has everything you could want in a poliziottesco title: a rebellious cop, fuzzy political cynicism, shocking violence, and rough and tumble car chases."

In 2009, Empire named it #9 in a poll of the "20 Greatest Gangster Movies You've Never Seen* (*Probably)".

== See also ==
- List of Italian films of 1973

== Footnotes ==
=== References ===
- Curti, Roberto (2013). Italian Crime Filmography, 1968-1980. McFarland. ISBN 978-0786469765.
