= Suzy Kendall =

British actress (born 1937)

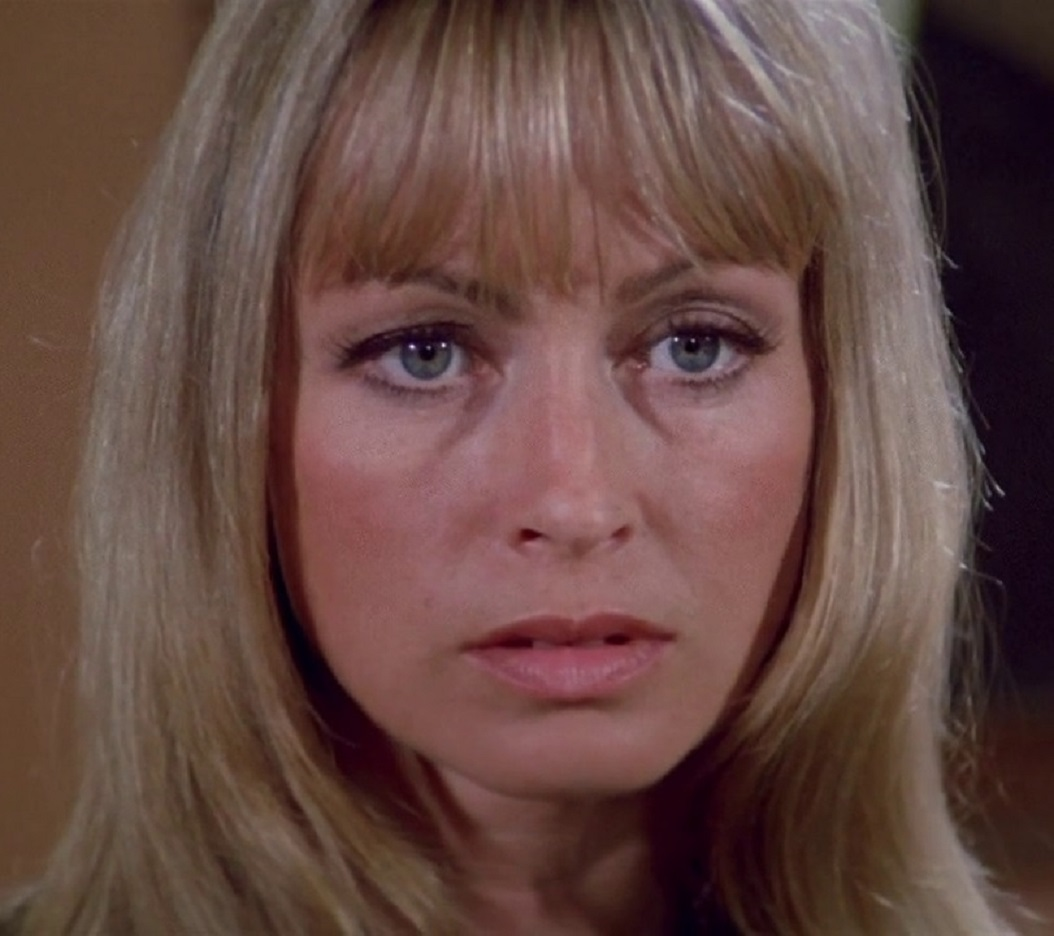
- Kendall in Torso (1973)
- Born: Freda Harriet Harrison; 1937 (age 88–89); Belper, Derbyshire, England, UK
- Occupation: Actress
- Years active: 1965–2012
- Spouses: Dudley Moore (m. 1968; div. 1972) Sandy Harper (after 1978)
- Children: Elodie Harper

Suzy Kendall (born Freda Harriet Harrison; 1937) is a British retired actress most notable for her film roles in the late 1960s and early 1970s.

== Early life ==
Kendall was born in Belper, Derbyshire, and attended the Herbert Strutt Grammar School. Later, she attended Derby & District College of Art where she studied painting and design.

== Career ==
Kendall was a fabric designer at British Celanese and then became a photographic model before becoming an actress. She initially appeared in supporting roles before progressing to female leads in a number of British films in the late 1960s. In the early 1970s, she appeared in several Italian giallo thrillers before returning to Britain and played supporting roles in a few more films until her retirement from screen acting in 1977.

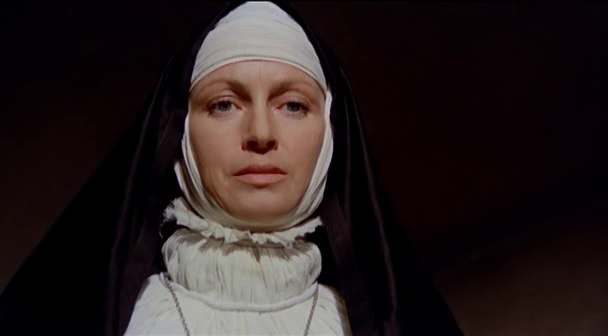
Kendall in Story of a Cloistered Nun (1973)

In 2012, Kendall made her first film appearance in 35 years in Berberian Sound Studio, billed in some sources as the mother of the lead character Gilderoy, played by Toby Jones, though the end credits on the film list her as "special guest screamer". The film is about a sound engineer working on an Italian horror film, which alludes to several appearances Kendall made in Italian genre films during the 1970s.

== Personal life ==
In 1968, Kendall married pianist, comedian and actor Dudley Moore. They divorced in 1972 and remained friends until Moore's death in 2002.

She married musician Sandy Harper (Alexander James Christopher Harper) shortly after her divorce. He was subsequently befriended by Moore who became godfather to their daughter Elodie Harper. In 2002 she hosted a memorial service for Moore attended by her second husband and daughter.

As of 2018, Kendall and Harper live in London.

== Filmography ==
- The Liquidator (1965) - Judith
- Thunderball (1965) - Prue (uncredited)
- Up Jumped a Swagman (1965) - Melissa Smythe-Fury
- Circus of Fear (1966) - Natasha
- The Sandwich Man (1966) - Sue
- To Sir, with Love (1967) - Gillian Blanchard
- The Penthouse (1967) - Barbara Willason
- Up the Junction (1968) - Polly
- 30 Is a Dangerous Age, Cynthia (1968) - Louise Hammond
- Fräulein Doktor (1969) - Fräulein Doktor
- The Gamblers (1970) - Candace
- The Bird with the Crystal Plumage (1970) - Julia
- Darker Than Amber (1970) - Vangie / Merrimay
- Assault (aka In the Devil's Garden) (1971) - Julie West
- Fear Is the Key (1972) - Sarah Ruthven
- Torso (1973) - Jane
- Tales That Witness Madness (1973) - Ann / Beatrice (segment 2 "Penny Farthing")
- Story of a Cloistered Nun (1973) - Mother Superior
- Spasmo (1974) - Barbara
- Craze (1974) - Sally
- To the Bitter End (1975) - Joan Jordan
- Adventures of a Private Eye (1977) - Laura
- Berberian Sound Studio (2012) - Special Guest Screamer

== TV appearances ==
- The Spies (1 episode, 1966) - Polly Katt
- Further Adventures of Lucky Jim (1 episode, 1967)
- The Persuaders! (1 episode, 1971: The Man In The Middle) - Kay Hunter
- Van der Valk (1 episode, 1977) - Marijka
