= The Screaming Mimi (novel) =

1949 novel by Fredric Brown

- First edition
- Author: Fredric Brown
- Language: English
- Genre: Mystery, detective novel
- Published: 1949 E. P. Dutton
- Publication place: United States
- Media type: Print (Hardback & Paperback)

The Screaming Mimi is a mystery novel by pulp writer Fredric Brown. It was first published in 1949 as a Dutton Guilt Edged Mystery. A shorter version of the book appeared in the October, 1949 issue of Mystery Book Magazine.

The plot follows an alcoholic journalist who struggles to maintain sobriety as he investigates a serial murderer who killed three women and injured a fourth.

== Adaptations ==
The Screaming Mimi was officially adapted into a movie, Gerd Oswald's Screaming Mimi, in 1958. The Bird with the Crystal Plumage was an unofficial adaptation by Dario Argento.
