= Carlo Alighiero =

Italian actor and stage director (1927–2021)

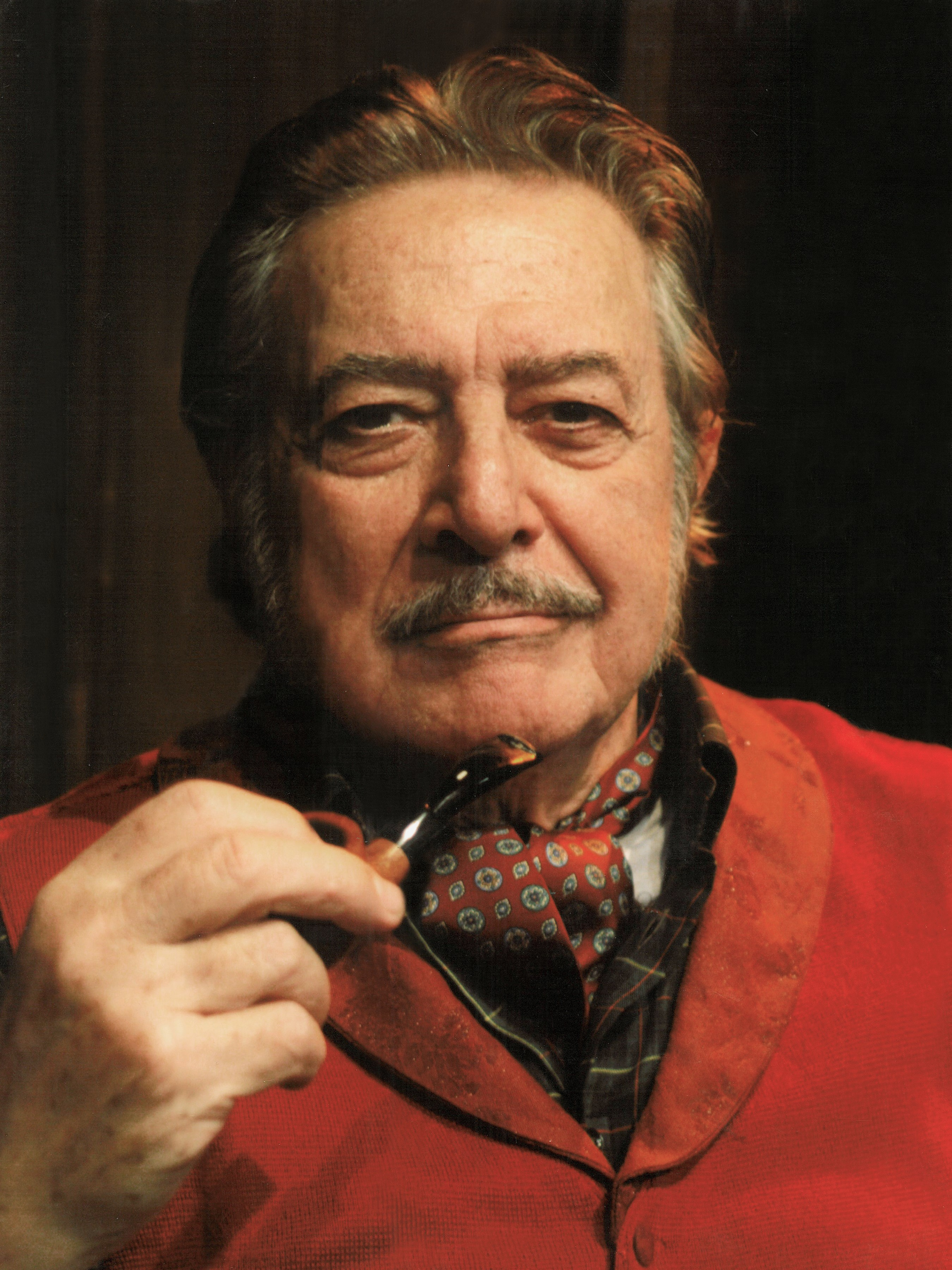
- Carlo Alighiero in 2008
- Born: Carlo Animali; 2 February 1927; Ostra, Italy
- Died: 11 September 2021 (aged 94); Rome, Italy
- Occupations: Actor; voice actor; director; playwright
- Spouse: Elena Cotta (m. 1952)
- Children: 2

Carlo Alighiero, stage name of Carlo Animali (2 February 1927 – 11 September 2021) was an Italian actor, director, and playwright.

== Biography ==
Animali was born on 2 February 1927 in Ostra. After attending the Brera Academy and the Accademia Nazionale di Arte Drammatica Silvio D'Amico, he made his theatre debut in 1952 in Padua. He began working with the Compagnia dei Giovani in Trieste. In the 1970s, he launched a course in independent theatrical training alongside Elena Cotta, who he met in 1949.

On television, he played the narrator in The Odyssey, directed by Franco Rossi, in 1968. He appeared in Le inchieste del commissario Maigret and in various films by Sergio Martino, Dario Argento, Damiano Damiani, and Lucio Fulci. His popularity in the general public is mainly associated with the role of Sgt. Howard in the television series Giallo club and in its follow-up Ritorna il sergente Sheridan.

Carlo Alighiero died in Rome on 11 September 2021 at the age of 94.

== Selected filmography ==
=== Cinema ===
- Mon oncle Benjamin (1969)
- The Five Man Army (1969)
- The Dove Must Not Fly (1970)
- The Strange Vice of Mrs. Wardh (1971)
- The Violent Professionals (1973)
- The Suspicious Death of a Minor (1975)
- Silent Action (1975)
- Gambling City (1975)
- The Tough Ones (1976)

=== Television ===
- The Odyssey (1968)
- Le inchieste del commissario Maigret (1964–1972)
