= Story of a Cloistered Nun =

1973 Italian film

- Directed by: Domenico Paolella
- Written by: Tonino Cervi; Domenico Paolella
- Produced by: Tonino Cervi; Luggi Waldleitner
- Starring: Eleonora Giorgi; Catherine Spaak; Suzy Kendall; Martine Brochard; Tino Carraro; Umberto Orsini
- Cinematography: Armando Nannuzzi
- Edited by: Amedeo Giomini
- Music by: Piero Piccioni
- Production companies: Roxy Film; Produzioni Atlas Consorziate
- Distributed by: Produzioni Atlas Consorziate (Italy)
- Release dates: November 9, 1973 (Italy); March 29, 1974 (West Germany)
- Running time: 97 minutes
- Countries: Italy; West Germany
- Language: Italian

Story of a Cloistered Nun (Italian: Storia di una monaca di clausura, released as Unholy Convent and Diary of a Cloistered Nun) is a 1973 Italian-language nunsploitation film directed by Domenico Paolella and starring Eleonora Giorgi, Catherine Spaak, Suzy Kendall, Martine Brochard, Tino Carraro, and Umberto Orsini. An international co-production of Italy and West Germany, the film claims to be inspired by real events that occurred in the 16th-century at the Certosa di San Giacomo.

== Plot ==
Refusing an arranged marriage, young aristocrat Carmela Simoni is sent to a convent. Her arrival intensifies the power struggle between the debauched nun Elisabeth and the stern Mother Superior, as both are smitten by Carmela's beauty.

== Cast ==
- Eleonora Giorgi as Carmela Simoni / Sister Agnes
- Catherine Spaak as Sister Elisabeth
- Suzy Kendall as Mother Superior
- Umberto Orsini as Don Diego
- Martine Brochard as Sister Lucia
- Tino Carraro as Marchese Antonio Simoni
- Caterina Boratto as Marchesa Simoni
- Ann Odessa as Sister Chiara
- Antonio Falsi as Giuliano
- Konrad Georg as Father Confessor
- Barbara Herrera as Sister Filomena
- Giuliana Calandra as Sister Rita
- Clara Colosimo as Sister Anziana
- Rina Franchetti as Sister Tomasina
- Isabelle Marchall as Sister Ladra
- Paola Senatore as Michaela
- Eleonora Morana as the peasant

Joan Collins was originally cast as the Mother Superior, but was replaced by Suzy Kendall before filming started.

== Reception ==
The film received limited critical attention, partly due to its limited availability before the rise of digital streaming platforms. Writing for Blueprint Review UK, George White described it as "a bleak and miserable film" that never lets viewers forget its roots as a sleazy exploitation picture.
