= Dutton Guilt Edged Mysteries =

Dutton Guilt Edged Mysteries was an imprint which published detective fiction. Between 1947 and 1956, the imprint published eighty-two novels. Its best known author was Mickey Spillane; Dutton published his first seven Mike Hammer novels.

In 2012, Penguin Group, USA, relaunched the Dutton Guilt Edged Mysteries as a digital imprint. Dutton publishes eBooks of original crime and detective short stories and novellas.

== Books ==
The first eBook published by Dutton Guilt Edged Mysteries in Summer 2012 was Murder in Mumbai. Published on July 17, 2012, Murder in Mumbai was written by K.D. Calamur. Calamur is an editor at NPR in Washington, D.C. He was brought up in Mumbai, where he began his journalistic career. Murder in Mumbai is his first novel.

Skin: A Mike Hammer Story written by Mickey Spillane and Max Allan Collins was published by DGE on July 17, 2012. The novel is an expansion of a short story written by Mickey Spillane and was completed by Collins as an addition to the Mike Hammer series.

Death in the Haight was published on August 21, 2012. This novel was written by Ronald Tierney. It is a new installment in a series of mysteries about Private Investigator Noah Lang. She investigates the murder of a prostitute and the disappearance of a fifteen-year-old.

Noir(ish) became available on September 18, 2012. Evan Guilford-Blake's novel, set in Los Angeles in the 1940s, tells the story of the murder of a mobster. Private Investigator Robert Grahame investigates and comes upon a connection with his own past.

The Devil Doesn't Want Me, by Eric Beetner, 2012.

“Bullets are my Business”, by Josh K. Stevens was published in 2012. It was his first novel.
