= Screaming Mimi (film) =

1958 film by Gerd Oswald

- Theatrical release poster
- Directed by: Gerd Oswald
- Screenplay by: Robert Blees
- Based on: The Screaming Mimi; 1949 novel by Fredric Brown
- Produced by: Harry Joe Brown; Robert Fellows
- Starring: Anita Ekberg; Philip Carey; Gypsy Rose Lee
- Cinematography: Burnett Guffey
- Edited by: Gene Havlick; Jerome Thoms
- Music by: Mischa Bakaleinikoff (uncredited)
- Production company: Sage Productions
- Distributed by: Columbia Pictures
- Release date: June 25, 1958
- Running time: 78 minutes
- Country: United States
- Language: English

Screaming Mimi is a 1958 American film noir directed by Gerd Oswald and starring Anita Ekberg, Philip Carey and Gypsy Rose Lee. The story originated as a 1949 novel of the same name by Fredric Brown.

== Plot ==
In Northern California, while Virginia Wilson is taking an outside beach shower, an escaped madman from a sanitarium arrives. He stabs her dog, attacks her and is shot to death by her stepbrother, Charlie, with a rifle.

After the attack, Virginia is committed to a sanitarium. The psychiatrist falls in love with her. He fakes her death, and they go on the lam. Virginia ends up dancing at El Madhouse night club run by Joann 'Gypsy' Mapes (real life burlesque dancer Gypsy Rose Lee). Lee performs "Put the Blame on Mame," the classic noir theme from the 1946 film Gilda.

All the while, Virginia is being stalked by a serial killer.

== Cast ==
- Anita Ekberg as Virginia Wilson / Yolanda Lange
- Philip Carey as Bill Sweeney
- Gypsy Rose Lee as Joann "Gypsy" Mapes
- Harry Townes as Dr. Greenwood / Bill Green
- Linda Cherney as Ketti
- Romney Brent as Charlie Weston
- Red Norvo as "Red" Yost (credited as The Red Norvo Trio)
- Frank J. Scannell as Paul, the Bartender
- Vaughn Taylor as Raoul, the Art Dealer (uncredited)

== Reception ==
Richard W. Nason, film critic for The New York Times, wrote, "It is an effective film of its kind, thanks to some reflective dialogue by Robert Blees and a sense of suspense on the part of Gerd Oswald, the director. Anita Ekberg, who does more acting here than before, is the star. Gypsy Rose Lee and Phil Carey are also on the ball."

Film critic Dennis Schwartz gave the film a C, describing the direction as lackluster and the story as so nonsensical that it entirely cripples the film. He summarized it as "a delusional film that seems fit for fetishists, voyeurs, those seeking a lurid oddball film with innovative noirish B/W photography by the great Burnett Guffey and, is especially suited, for lovers of bad-movies."

== See also ==
- List of American films of 1958
