= Kidnap Syndicate =

- DVD cover
- Directed by: Fernando Di Leo
- Screenplay by: Cesare Manzani; Fernando Di Leo; Ernesto Gastaldi
- Story by: Galliano Juso
- Produced by: Galliano Juso
- Starring: James Mason; Luc Merenda; Valentina Cortese; Irina Maleeva
- Cinematography: Erico Menczer
- Edited by: Sergio Montanari
- Music by: Luis Enriquez Bacalov
- Production company: Cinemaster
- Distributed by: Medusa
- Release date: 27 August 1975 (Italy)
- Running time: 110 minutes
- Country: Italy
- Box office: ₤908,268 million

Kidnap Syndicate (Italian: La città sconvolta: caccia spietata ai rapitori, lit. 'The City is Shaken: Ruthless Pursuit of the Kidnappers') is a 1975 Italian poliziottesco film directed by Fernando Di Leo. Even being a minor work in the Di Leo's filmography, the film gained some critical attention for being an original re-interpretation of the "vigilante" subgenre.

== Cast ==
- Luc Merenda as Mario Colella
- James Mason as Engineer Filippini
- Valentina Cortese as Countess Grazia Filippini
- Vittorio Caprioli as Commissioner Magrini
- Irina Maleeva as Lina
- Marino Masé as Pardi
- Marco Liofredi as Fabrizio Colella
- Francesco Impeciati as Antonio Filippini
- Renato Baldini as Antonio Policriti
- Alessio Juso as Antonio Filippini's Son

== Production ==
The film's story is credited to Galliano Juso, the producer of the film. The film's director Fernando Di Leo stated that the producer came up with the idea for the film based on kidnappings which he described as "a hot topic back then". Di Leo stated that the producer would call up the distributors in Italy to tell them the story for the film and if more of them were not interested in the story than were, it would not get made. Ernesto Gastaldi stated that despite being credited with Cesare Manzani that he himself wrote the script for the film, stating that Juso did come up with the idea for the film but that Di Leo did not write it, stating that the two just discussed the script after it was already completed with Gastaldi making adjustments where Di Leo felt the script was wrong. Gastaldi described the film as a "nasty film about nasty times".

The film was shot at Rizzoli Film in Rome and on location in Rome and Milan.

== Release ==
Kidnap Syndicate was distributed theatrically in Italy by Medusa on 27 August 1975. The film grossed a total of 908,268,910 Italian lire domestically. Italian film historian Roberto Curti described its profit as a "moderate box office success".

== Reception ==
Curti stated that the film was lambasted by Italian film critics. Claudio G. Fava stated in Corriere Mercantile that "all the worst defects of the worst of Italian cinema can be found in this minutely banal film" Sandro Casazza of La Stampa declared it as an "immoral and asocial film (the thread dedicated to the "silent majority" numbers a large number of titles ever since Straw Dogs)."
