= Fulvio Mingozzi =

Italian actor (1925-2000)

Fulvio Mingozzi (6 October 1925 – 19 September 2000) was an Italian actor. Active from 1966 as a character actor, he acted, albeit in brief and marginal roles and cameos, in all the films of Dario Argento, ranging from The Bird with the Crystal Plumage (1970) to Phenomena (1985).
