= Los Angeles Film Critics Association Award for Best Actor =

Annual US film award

- Awarded for: Best Performance by an Actor in a Leading Role
- Country: United States
- Presented by: Los Angeles Film Critics Association
- First award: Al Pacino; Dog Day Afternoon (1975)
- Final award: Simon Rex; Red Rocket (2021)
- Website: lafca.net

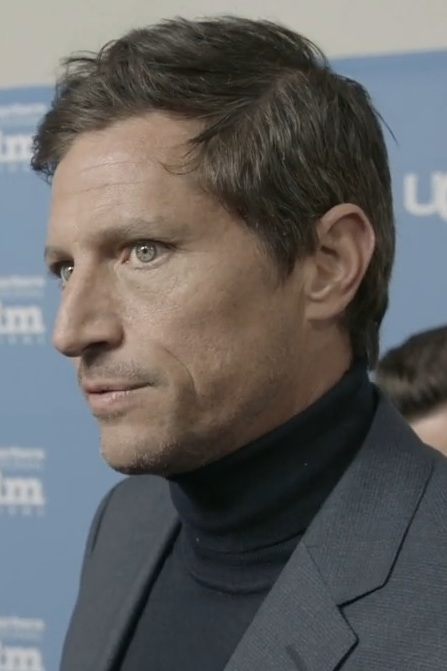
Simon Rex during an interview in March 2022.

The Los Angeles Film Critics Association Award for Best Actor was an award given annually by the Los Angeles Film Critics Association. It was introduced in 1975 to reward the best performance by a leading actor. In 2022, it was announced that the four acting categories would be retired and replaced with two gender neutral categories, with both Best Actor and Best Actress merging into the Best Lead Performance category.

== Winners ==
=== 1970s ===
Year	Winner	Film	Role
1975	Al Pacino	Dog Day Afternoon	Sonny Wortzik
1976	Robert De Niro	Taxi Driver	Travis Bickle
1977	Richard Dreyfuss	The Goodbye Girl	Elliot Garfield
1978	Jon Voight	Coming Home	Luke Martin
1979	Dustin Hoffman	Kramer vs. Kramer	Ted Kramer

=== 1980s ===
Year	Winner(s)	Film	Role
1980	Robert De Niro	Raging Bull	Jake LaMotta
1981	Burt Lancaster	Atlantic City	Lou Pascal
1982	Ben Kingsley	Gandhi	Mahatma Gandhi
1983	Robert Duvall	Tender Mercies	Mac Sledge
1984	F. Murray Abraham	Amadeus	Antonio Salieri
1984	Albert Finney	Under the Volcano	Geoffrey Firmin
1985	William Hurt	Kiss of the Spider Woman	Luis Molina
1986	Bob Hoskins	Mona Lisa	George
1987	Jack Nicholson	Ironweed	Francis Phelan
1987	Jack Nicholson	The Witches of Eastwick	Daryl Van Horne
1987	Steve Martin	Roxanne	Charlie "C.D." Bales
1988	Tom Hanks	Big	Josh Baskin
1988	Tom Hanks	Punchline	Steven Gold
1989	Daniel Day-Lewis	My Left Foot	Christy Brown

=== 1990s ===
Year	Winner	Film	Role
1990	Jeremy Irons	Reversal of Fortune	Claus von Bülow
1991	Nick Nolte	The Prince of Tides	Tom Wingo
1992	Clint Eastwood	Unforgiven	William "Will" Munny
1993	Anthony Hopkins	The Remains of the Day	James Stevens
1993	Anthony Hopkins	Shadowlands	Jack Lewis
1994	John Travolta	Pulp Fiction	Vincent Vega
1995	Nicolas Cage	Leaving Las Vegas	Ben Sanderson
1996	Geoffrey Rush	Shine	David Helfgott (adult)
1997	Robert Duvall	The Apostle	Euliss "Sonny" Dewey / The Apostle
1998	Ian McKellen	Gods and Monsters	James Whale
1999	Russell Crowe	The Insider	Jeffrey Wigand

=== 2000s ===
Year	Winner(s)	Film	Role
2000	Michael Douglas	Wonder Boys	Grady Tripp
2001	Denzel Washington	Training Day	Detective Alonzo Harris
2002	Daniel Day-Lewis	Gangs of New York	William "Bill the Butcher" Cutting
2002	Jack Nicholson	About Schmidt	Warren Schmidt
2003	Bill Murray	Lost in Translation	Bob Harris
2004	Liam Neeson	Kinsey	Dr. Alfred Kinsey
2005	Philip Seymour Hoffman	Capote	Truman Capote
2006	Sacha Baron Cohen	Borat	Borat Sagdiyev
2006	Forest Whitaker	The Last King of Scotland	Idi Amin
2007	Daniel Day-Lewis	There Will Be Blood	Daniel Plainview
2008	Sean Penn	Milk	Harvey Milk
2009	Jeff Bridges	Crazy Heart	Otis "Bad" Blake

=== 2010s ===
Year	Winner	Film	Role
2010	Colin Firth	The King's Speech	King George VI
2011	Michael Fassbender	A Dangerous Method	Carl Jung
2011	Michael Fassbender	Jane Eyre	Edward Rochester
2011	Michael Fassbender	Shame	Brandon Sullivan
2011	Michael Fassbender	X-Men: First Class	Erik Lensherr / Magneto
2012	Joaquin Phoenix	The Master	Freddie Quell
2013	Bruce Dern	Nebraska	Woody Grant
2014	Tom Hardy	Locke	Ivan Locke
2015	Michael Fassbender	Steve Jobs	Steve Jobs
2016	Adam Driver	Paterson	Paterson
2017	Timothée Chalamet	Call Me by Your Name	Elio Perlman
2018	Ethan Hawke	First Reformed	Reverend Ernst Toller
2019	Antonio Banderas	Pain and Glory	Salvador Mallo

=== 2020s ===
Year	Winner	Film	Role
2020	Chadwick Boseman	Ma Rainey's Black Bottom	Levee Green
2021	Simon Rex	Red Rocket	Mikey Saber

== Multiple winners ==
3 wins

- Daniel Day-Lewis (1989, 2002, 2007)

2 wins

- Robert De Niro (1976, 1980)
- Robert Duvall (1983, 1997)
- Jack Nicholson (1987, 2002)
- Michael Fassbender (2011, 2015)

== See also ==
- National Board of Review Award for Best Actor
- New York Film Critics Circle Award for Best Actor
- National Society of Film Critics Award for Best Actor
