= Los Angeles Film Critics Association Award for Best Actress =

Annual US film award

- Awarded for: Best Performance by an Actress in a Leading Role
- Country: United States
- Presented by: Los Angeles Film Critics Association
- First award: Florinda Bolkan; A Brief Vacation (1975)
- Final award: Penélope Cruz; Parallel Mothers (2021)
- Website: lafca.net

The Los Angeles Film Critics Association Award for Best Actress was an award given annually by the Los Angeles Film Critics Association. It was introduced in 1975 to reward the best performance by a leading actress. In 2022, it was announced that the four acting categories would be retired and replaced with two gender neutral categories, with both Best Actor and Best Actress merging into the Best Lead Performance category.

== Winners ==
=== 1970s ===
Year	Winner	Film	Role
1975	Florinda Bolkan	A Brief Vacation	Clara Mataro
1976	Liv Ullmann	Face to Face (Ansikte mot ansikte)	Dr. Jenny Isaksson
1977	Shelley Duvall	3 Women	Mildred Lammoreaux
1978	Jane Fonda	California Suite	Hannah Warren
1978	Jane Fonda	Comes a Horseman	Ella Connors
1978	Jane Fonda	Coming Home	Sally Hyde
1979	Sally Field	Norma Rae	Norma Rae Webster

=== 1980s ===
Year	Winner(s)	Film	Role
1980	Sissy Spacek	Coal Miner's Daughter	Loretta Webb/Lynn
1981	Meryl Streep	The French Lieutenant's Woman	Sarah Woodruff / Anna
1982	Meryl Streep	Sophie's Choice	Zofia "Sophie" Zawistowski
1983	Shirley MacLaine	Terms of Endearment	Aurora Greenway
1984	Kathleen Turner	Crimes of Passion	Joanna Crane / China Blue
1984	Kathleen Turner	Romancing the Stone	Joan Wilder
1985	Meryl Streep	Out of Africa	Karen Blixen
1986	Sandrine Bonnaire	Vagabond (Sans toit ni loi)	Mona Bergeron
1987	Holly Hunter	Broadcast News	Jane Craig
1987	Sally Kirkland	Anna	Anna
1988	Christine Lahti	Running on Empty	Annie Pope / Cynthia Manfield
1989	Andie MacDowell	Sex, Lies, and Videotape	Ann Bishop Mullany
1989	Michelle Pfeiffer	The Fabulous Baker Boys	Susie Diamond

=== 1990s ===
Year	Winner(s)	Film	Role
1990	Anjelica Huston	The Grifters	Lilly Dillon
1990	Anjelica Huston	The Witches	Miss Eva Ernst / The Grand High Witch
1991	Mercedes Ruehl	The Fisher King	Anne Napolitano
1992	Emma Thompson	Howards End	Margaret Schlegel
1993	Holly Hunter	The Piano	Ada McGrath
1994	Jessica Lange	Blue Sky	Carly Marshall
1995	Elisabeth Shue	Leaving Las Vegas	Sera
1996	Brenda Blethyn	Secrets & Lies	Cynthia Rose Purley
1997	Helena Bonham Carter	The Wings of the Dove	Kate Croy
1998	Fernanda Montenegro	Central Station (Central do Brasil)	Isadora "Dora" Teixeira
1998	Ally Sheedy	High Art	Lucy Berliner
1999	Hilary Swank	Boys Don't Cry	Brandon Teena

=== 2000s ===
Year	Winner	Film	Role
2000	Julia Roberts	Erin Brockovich	Erin Brockovich
2001	Sissy Spacek	In the Bedroom	Ruth Fowler
2002	Julianne Moore	Far from Heaven	Cathy Whitaker
2002	Julianne Moore	The Hours	Laura McGrath Brown
2003	Naomi Watts	21 Grams	Cristina Peck
2004	Imelda Staunton	Vera Drake	Vera Drake
2005	Vera Farmiga	Down to the Bone	Irene Morrison
2006	Helen Mirren	The Queen	Queen Elizabeth II
2007	Marion Cotillard	La Vie en Rose (La môme)	Édith Piaf
2008	Sally Hawkins	Happy-Go-Lucky	Pauline "Poppy" Cross
2009	Yolande Moreau	Séraphine	Séraphine Louis

=== 2010s ===
Year	Winner(s)	Film	Role
2010	Kim Hye-ja	Mother	Mother
2011	Yoon Jeong-hee	Poetry	Yang Mi-ja
2012	Jennifer Lawrence	Silver Linings Playbook	Tiffany Maxwell
2012	Emmanuelle Riva	Amour	Anne Laurent
2013	Cate Blanchett	Blue Jasmine	Jeanette "Jasmine" Francis
2013	Adèle Exarchopoulos	Blue Is the Warmest Colour	Adèle
2014	Patricia Arquette	Boyhood	Olivia Evans
2015	Charlotte Rampling	45 Years	Kate Mercer
2016	Isabelle Huppert	Elle	Michèle Leblanc
2016	Isabelle Huppert	Things to Come	Nathalie Chazeaux
2017	Sally Hawkins	The Shape of Water	Elisa Esposito
2018	Olivia Colman	The Favourite	Queen Anne
2019	Mary Kay Place	Diane	Diane

=== 2020s ===
Year	Winner(s)	Film	Role
2020	Carey Mulligan	Promising Young Woman	Cassandra Thomas
2021	Penélope Cruz	Parallel Mothers	Janis Martinez

== Multiple winners ==
3 wins

- Meryl Streep (1981, 1982, 1985)

2 wins

- Sally Hawkins (2008, 2017)
- Holly Hunter (1987, 1993)
- Sissy Spacek (1980, 2001)

== See also ==
- National Board of Review Award for Best Actress
- New York Film Critics Circle Award for Best Actress
- National Society of Film Critics Award for Best Actress
