= Salvatore Naturile =

American bank robber

Mug shot of Naturile

Salvatore Antonio "Sal" Naturile, also known as Donald Matterson (June 26, 1953 – August 23, 1972) was an American bank robber whose attempted robbery of a Chase Manhattan bank branch in Brooklyn, along with John Wojtowicz, in August 1972, inspired the 1975 film Dog Day Afternoon. In the film he is portrayed by actor John Cazale.

Naturile sported a faint blond mustache, and crude tattoos on his arms and thighs.

== The robbery ==
Naturile and Wojtowicz first met at Danny's, a gay bar on Seventh Avenue South in lower Manhattan, where Wojtowicz initially claimed that a bank executive from Chase Manhattan had suggested they rob the bank.

On August 22, 1972, Naturile and two accomplices attempted to rob a branch of the Chase Manhattan bank at 450 Avenue P in Gravesend, Brooklyn; the robbery was led by John Wojtowicz and Robert Westenberg. The robbers entered the bank armed with a .38 caliber handgun and carrying a box which contained a shotgun and a rifle; all three weapons were purchased by Wojtowicz.

Westenberg was to provide the demand note to the bank manager but, unnerved by a police car on the street, fled the scene before the robbery was announced. Wojtowicz and Naturile then held seven Chase Manhattan bank employees hostage for 14 hours. Wojtowicz, a former bank teller, had some knowledge of bank operations and drew inspiration from scenes of The Godfather (1972), which he had seen earlier that day. The note they passed to the cashier read: "This is an offer you can't refuse."

During the robbery, Naturile was dressed in a black business suit and tie, and carried an attaché case. His last meal consisted of takeout pizza and soda pop, which he consumed during the holdout at the bank with the hostages. The robbery was meant to fund the sex reassignment operation of Wojtowicz's lover, Elizabeth Eden.

=== The standoff with police ===
During the robbery, Wojtowicz fired a single shot at the police through the Chase Manhattan bank's exit rear door, fearing the police were preparing to storm the building. Only one other shot was fired during the standoff: when the rifle used by Wojtowicz accidentally discharged when it was dropped on the floor.

Naturile was killed by an FBI agent during the final moments of the incident. Wojtowicz was arrested.
