= The Dog (film) =

2013 film by Allison Berg & Frank Keraudren

- Film poster
- Directed by: Allison Berg; Frank Keraudren
- Written by: Allison Berg; Frank Keraudren
- Starring: John Wojtowicz; Carmen Bifulco; Jeremy Bowker
- Release date: September 2013 (Toronto)
- Running time: 101 minutes
- Country: United States
- Language: English

The Dog (also known as Storyville: The Great Sex Addict Heist) is a 2013 documentary film co-written and co-directed by Allison Berg and Frank Keraudren, about the real-life story of bisexual bank robber John Wojtowicz that inspired the 1975 Al Pacino movie Dog Day Afternoon about his August 1972 attempted heist and 14-hour televised hostage situation in Brooklyn to pay for his lover's sex-reassignment surgery.

The film premiered at the 2013 Toronto International Film Festival.

== Cast ==
- John Wojtowicz - Himself
- Carmen Bifulco - Herself
- Jeremy Bowker - (voice only)
- Liz Debbie Eden - Herself
- George Heath - Himself
- Bob Kappstatter - Himself
- Eugene Lowenkopf - Himself (billed as Dr. Eugene Lowenkopf)
- P.S. Mueller - (voice only)
- Jeremiah Newton - Himself
- Stan Thaler - Himself
- Richard Wandel - Himself
- Randolfe Wicker - Himself (billed as Randy Wicker)
- Theresa Basso Wojtowicz - Herself
- Tony Wojtowicz - Himself

== Reception ==
After ten years in the making, The Dog premiered at the Toronto International Film Festival in September 2013.

Will Dean, TV reviewer of The Independent, noted that "Allison Berg and Frank Keraudren have done a fine job" of presenting a complex and diverse story of John Wojtowicz's life.
