= A Man to Respect =

- US theatrical release poster
- Directed by: Michele Lupo
- Screenplay by: Michele Lupo
- Produced by: Marina Cicogna
- Starring: Kirk Douglas; Giuliano Gemma; Florinda Bolkan; Rene Koldenhoff; Romano Puppo; Wolfgang Miller Preiss
- Cinematography: Tonino Delli Colli
- Edited by: Antonietta Zita
- Music by: Ennio Morricone
- Production companies: Paramount-Orion Film Production GmbH; Verona Cinematografica
- Release date: 8 December 1972 (West Germany)
- Running time: 112 minutes
- Countries: West Germany; Italy

A Man to Respect (Italian: Un uomo da rispettare, German: Ein achtbarer Mann), released in some territories as The Master Touch, is a 1972 crime film directed by Michele Lupo starring Kirk Douglas, Giuliano Gemma and Florinda Bolkan.

== Plot summary ==
Steve Wallace, a safecracker, has just been released from prison. He attempts one last burglary in Germany with the help of a circus gymnast.

== Cast ==
- Kirk Douglas as Steve Wallace
- Giuliano Gemma as Marco
- Florinda Bolkan as Anna
- Wolfgang Preiss as Miller
- Reinhard Kolldehoff as Detective Hoffman
- Romano Puppo as Miller's Lieutenant
- Bruno Corazzari as Eric
- John Bartha as Murdered Security Guard
- Allen Stanley
- Vittorio Fanfoni
- Luigi Antonio Guerra

== Release ==
A Man to Respect was distributed theatrically in Germany on 8 December 1972.

== Critical reception ==
On DVD Talk, Tyler Foster wrote of the climatic ending: "It's such an impressive turn of events that it's easy to let the movie's faults slide; an ending that truly saves the best part of the film for last."
