= The Anonymous Venetian =

The Anonymous Venetian can refer to:

- The Anonymous Venetian (film), a film
- The Anonymous Venetian (novel), a book by Donna Leon
