= José Júlio de Andrade =

Brazilian plantation owner and politician (1862-1953)

José Júlio de Andrade Colonel Zé Júlio Czar do Jari
- Born: July 26, 1862; Uruburetama, Brazil
- Died: June 24, 1953 (aged 90); Rio de Janeiro, Brazil
- Resting place: São João Batista Cemetery , Rio de Janeiro
- Spouse: Laura Neno de Andrade

José Júlio de Andrade (Uruburetama, Brazil, July 26, 1862 – Rio de Janeiro, Brazil, June 24, 1953), also known as Colonel Zé Júlio or Czar do Jari, was a large-scale land owner and merchant in Pará, Brazil. Andrade was born in the state of Ceará, but later lived in the village of Arumanduba, Pará. He was the largest landowner in the region, with 3,000,000 hectares (7,400,000 acres), including properties in the municipalities of Almeirim and Porto de Moz, in Pará; and in the municipalities of Laranjal do Jari and Mazagão, in the state of Amapá.

He became the richest merchant in the export business of latex, andiroba, and Brazil nuts in the Pará and Amapá regions of Brazil. He traveled to numerous countries in Europe, Africa, and Asia due to his growing wealth. Andrade acquired the honorary military title of "Colonel of the National Guard" of the Brazilian Army. Andrade additionally exerted significant political, social, and economic influence in the region. He was elected Senator of the Belém Chamber for successive terms and met President Getúlio Vargas in the 1930s. He was an enemy of Lieutenant Magalhães Barata, Federal Interventor in Pará, due to his friendship with journalist Paulo Maranhão.

Andrade practiced coronelismo, and ruled his estates "as a feudal lord of the region." He owned slaves long after the abolition of slavery in Brazil, used instruments of torture on his lands, and was "unfathomably" cruel. He ruled his agricultural lands with an iron fist, and prioritized the production of his land over the people who worked there. Local testimonies say he took the daughters of his employees for domestic, sexual, and eccentric work, resembling ancient medieval fiefdoms. His treatment of workers was noted in detail in regional newspapers of the period, notably O Estado de Pará, O Imparcial, and Folha do Norte.

Andrade married Laura Neno de Andrade, daughter of the Intendant of Almeirim. Laura Neno de Andrade, and José Júlio de Andrade had many mistresses, including Chiquinha Rodrigues, whom he met in Jarí. Andrade recognized no children from his mistresses. His inheritance went to Maria Laura, the eldest daughter of a nephew. In 1949, he withdrew from the municipalities of Almeirim, Mazagão and Porto de Moz, and sold his farm on the Aquiqui River to Michel de Melo e Silva and Jaripara to a group of Portuguese. José Júlio de Andrade died in Rio de Janeiro on June 24, 1953 at 90 years old, and is interred in the São João Batista Cemetery in that city.

== Bibi Costa Mansion ==
Andrade, similar to the rural landowners of Pará, built a town mansion in the state capital of Belém during the rule during the government of Antônio Lemos (1897-1911). Lemos, as part of numerous urban reforms of the city, created a neighborhood for the wealthy élites, Nazaré. José Júlio de Andrade built the mansion to welcome the president of Brazil, Afonso Pena, to Belém. It was built in the eclecticm style of the period by the engineer Francisco Bolonha (1872–1938). Bolonha, like Andrade, travelled to Europe, and incorporated new building techniques. The Bibi Costa Mansion has one of the earliest uses of reinforced concrete in Brazil. Andrade's reputation as a cruel landowner followed him to Belém, however, and the Bibi Costa mansion has a long history of being haunted, with "dozens of testimonies of the noise of chains dragging across the floor, sudden screams, figures, and voices."
