= Adriana Asti =

Italian actress (1931–2025)

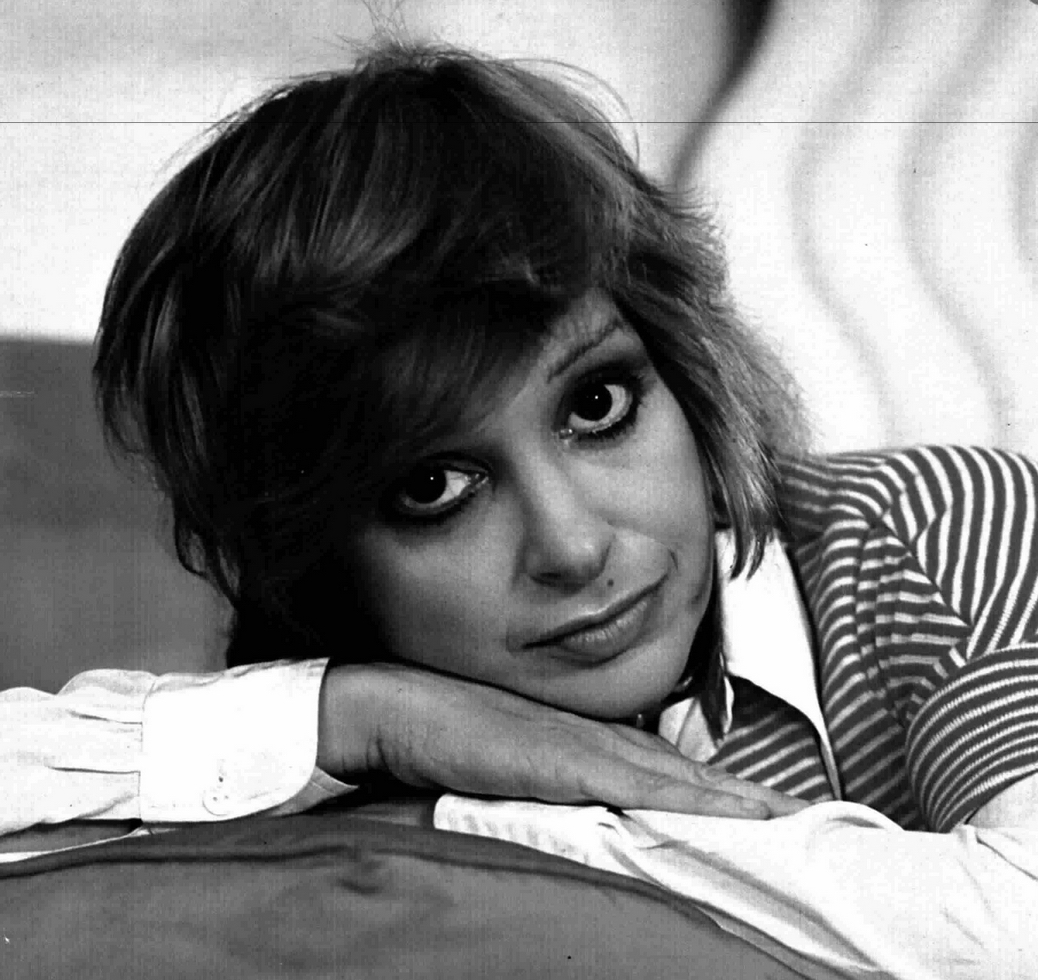
- Asti in 1972
- Born: 30 April 1931; Milan, Italy
- Died: 31 July 2025 (aged 94); Rome, Italy
- Occupation: Actress
- Years active: 1948–2018
- Spouse: Bernardo Bertolucci

Adriana Asti (30 April 1931 – 31 July 2025) was an Italian stage, film and voice actress.

== Life and career ==
Asti was born on 30 April 1931. She appeared in Dino Risi's short film Buio in sala, shot in 1948.

She made her theatrical debut in 1951 in Plautus' Miles Gloriosus with the Bolzano stock company, and achieved her first success with a part in Arthur Miller's The Crucible, directed by Luchino Visconti, who later cast her in his films Rocco and His Brothers and Ludwig.

On stage, she starred in Saint Joan by George Bernard Shaw, Happy Days by Samuel Beckett, The Mistress of the Inn by Carlo Goldoni, and Three Men for Amalia. She won the SIAE prize in June 1990, and the Duse prize in December 1993. In 1999, she wrote and starred in Alcohol. In July 2000, she starred in French Ferdinand.

Asti died on 31 July 2025, at the age of 94.

== Selected filmography ==
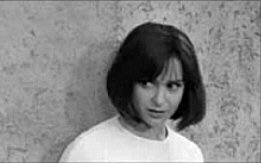
Adriana Asti in Before the Revolution

- You're on Your Own, by Mauro Bolognini (1959)
- Rocco and His Brothers, by Luchino Visconti (1960)
- Accattone, by Pier Paolo Pasolini (1961)
- Disorder, by Franco Brusati (1962)
- Before the Revolution, by Bernardo Bertolucci (1964)
- The Visionaries, by Maurizio Ponzi (1968)
- Run, Psycho, Run, by Brunello Rondi (1968)
- Caprice Italian Style, by Pier Paolo Pasolini (1968)
- Duet for Cannibals, by Susan Sontag (1969)
- Metti, una sera a cena, by Giuseppe Patroni Griffi (1969)
- Man of the Year, by Marco Vicario (1971)
- My Darling Slave, by Giorgio Capitani (1972)
- Le notti peccaminose di Pietro l'Aretino, by Manlio Scarpelli (1972)
- I Nicotera, TV miniseries by Salvatore Nocita (1972)
- Ludwig, by Luchino Visconti (1972)
- Amore e ginnastica, by Luigi Filippo D'Amico (1973)
- A Brief Vacation, by Vittorio De Sica (1973)
- The Sensual Man, by Marco Vicario (1974)
- The Phantom of Liberty, by Luis Buñuel (1974)
- Down the Ancient Staircase, by Mauro Bolognini (1975)
- Zorro, by Duccio Tessari (1975)
- Weak Spot, by Peter Fleischmann (1975)
- The Sex Machine, by Pasquale Festa Campanile (1975)
- The Inheritance, by Mauro Bolognini (1976)
- A Simple Heart, by Giorgio Ferrara (1977)
- Black Journal, by Giovanni Narzisi (1977)
- Maschio latino cercasi, by Mauro Bolognini (1977)
- Stato interessante, by Sergio Nasca (1977)
- Caligula, by Tinto Brass (1980)
- Action, by Tinto Brass (1980)
- Petomaniac, by Pasquale Festa Campanile (1983)
- Chimère, by Claire Devers (1989)
- The Handsome Priest, by Carlo Mazzacurati (1989)
- Who Killed Pasolini?, by Marco Tullio Giordana (1995)
- The Seventh Room, by Márta Mészáros (1995)
- Bimba - È clonata una stella, by Sabina Guzzanti (2002)
- The Best of Youth, by Marco Tullio Giordana (2003)
- Once You're Born You Can No Longer Hide, by Marco Tullio Giordana (2005)
- Karol: The Pope, The Man, by Giacomo Battiato (2006)
- Unforgivable, by André Téchiné (2011)
- Pasolini, by Abel Ferrara (2014)
- Diary of a Chambermaid, by Benoît Jacquot (2015)
- A Woman's Name, by Marco Tullio Giordana (2018)

== Awards and nominations ==
Award	Year	Nominated work	Category	Result
David di Donatello Awards	1974	David Special Award		Won
Nastro d'Argento Awards	1965	Before the Revolution	Best Actress	Nominated
Nastro d'Argento Awards	1974	A Brief Vacation	Best Supporting Actress	Won
Nastro d'Argento Awards	1977	The Inheritance	Best Supporting Actress	Won
Nastro d'Argento Awards	2004	The Best of Youth	Best Actress	Won
Nastro d'Argento Awards	2004	Tosca e altre due	Best Actress	Nominated
Nastro d'Argento Awards	2015	Special Nastro d'Argento		Won
Nastro d'Argento Awards	2018	A Woman's Name	Best Supporting Actress	Nominated
