= Florinda Bolkan =

Brazilian-Italian actress and model (b. 1941)

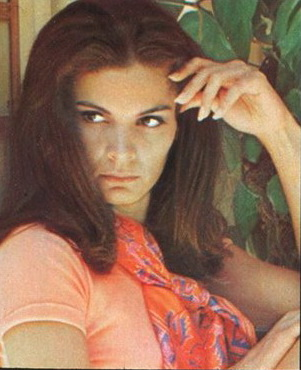
- Born: Florinda Soares Bulcão; 15 February 1941 (age 85); Uruburetama, Ceará, Brazil
- Occupation: Actress
- Years active: 1968–2020
- Height: 5 ft 9 in (1.75 m)
- Relatives: Willy Bogner Jr. (brother-in-law)
- Website: florindabolkan.com

Florinda Bolkan (born Florinda Soares Bulcão; 15 February 1941) is a Brazilian retired actress and model based in Italy. She is best known for her acting work in Italy, where she twice won the David di Donatello for Best Actress, for The Anonymous Venetian (1970) and Dear Parents (1973).

== Early life ==
Bolkan was born Florinda Soares Bulcão in Uruburetama. Her father José Pedro Soares Bulcão, commonly known as Soares Bulcão, was a renowned journalist and politician. She lived in Fortaleza and Rio de Janeiro until she moved to the United States. A former flight inspector for Brazilian international carrier Varig, she became fluent in English, Italian and French.

== Career ==
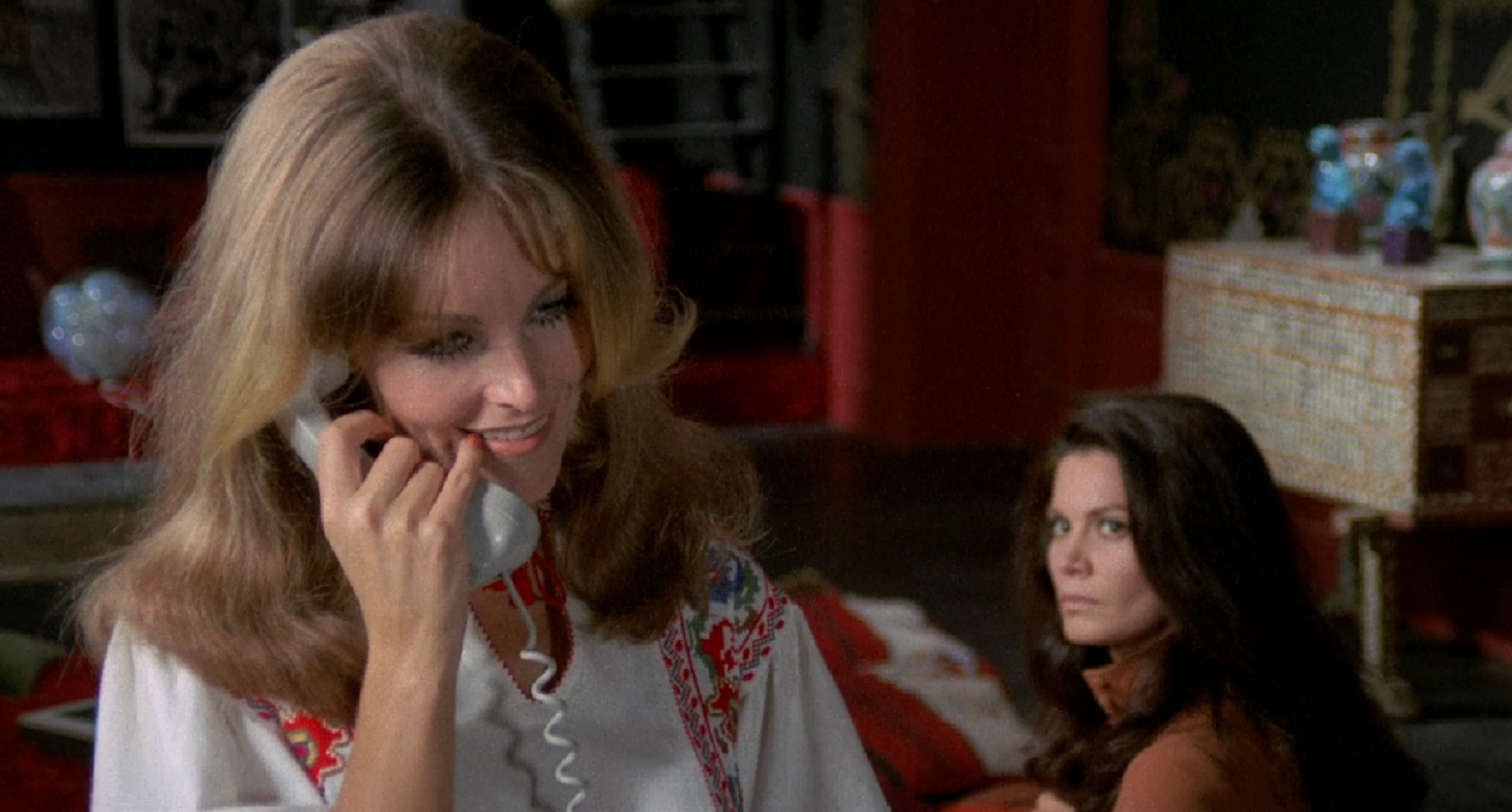
Bolkan and Anita Strindberg in A Lizard in a Woman's Skin (1971)

During the 1960s, Bolkan worked as a model in the United States. After being introduced to Italian Countess Marina Cicogna, who would become her long-time partner, she moved to Italy in 1968, where she made her film debut with a small part in the all-star sex comedy Candy (1968). Cicogna later introduced her to director Luchino Visconti, who cast her in The Damned.

She worked in more than forty films, mainly in Italy. She was directed by Vittorio de Sica in A Brief Vacation. Under Elio Petri's direction, she made Investigation of a Citizen Above Suspicion, which won both the 1970 Palme d'Or and the 1971 Academy Award for Best Foreign Language Film. Enrico Maria Salerno directed her in The Anonymous Venetian, which earned her first David di Donatello Award. She worked with Jean-Louis Trintignant, John Cassavetes, and Annie Girardot.

She acted in two giallo films directed by Lucio Fulci, A Lizard in a Woman's Skin and Don't Torture a Duckling.

Bolkan acted alongside Kirk Douglas in the 1972 Italian film, The Master Touch.

Bolkan has won the David di Donatello award three times. She won the David di Donatello for Best Actress for The Anonymous Venetian (1970) in 1971, and for Dear Parents (1973) in the same year of release.

She appeared in 19 episodes of the Italian crime drama television series La piovra.

In 2000, Bolkan debuted as director in the Brazilian film Eu Não Conhecia Tururu. Besides directing, she also plays a major character in the film. She continues to act in European films, mostly Italian films.

== Personal life ==
Bolkan is bisexual. For 20 years, Bolkan was the life partner of film producer Countess Marina Cicogna. She was an alleged lover of John F. Kennedy. Helmut Berger writes in his autobiography Ich that he and Bolkan had an affair. At various times, she was also romantically-linked to Ryan O'Neal, Richard Burton, Porfirio Rubirosa, and Samuel Wainer.

== Filmography ==
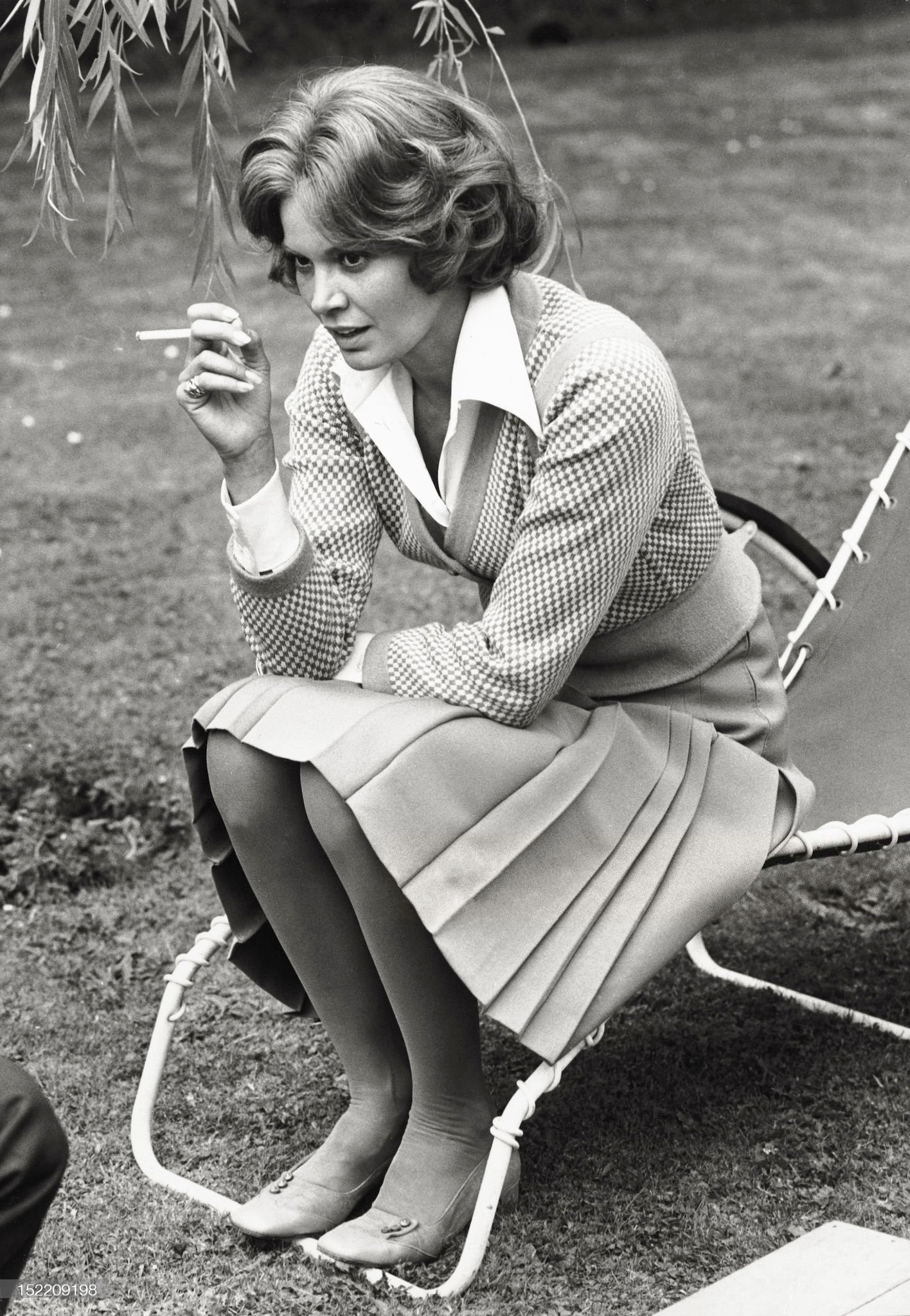
Bolkan in Dear Parents (1973)

=== Film ===
Year	Title	Role	Notes
1968	Candy	Lolita	
1969	The Damned	Olga	
1969	A Complicated Girl	Greta	Special David di Donatello Award
1969	Metti, una sera a cena	Nina	Special David di Donatello Award
1969	Machine Gun McCain	Joni Amado	
1969	Le voleur de crimes	Florinda	
1969	Detective Belli	Vera Fontana	
1970	Investigation of a Citizen Above Suspicion	Augusta Terzi	
1970	Mafia Connection	Rossana Sciortino	
1970	The Anonymous Venetian	Valeria	David di Donatello Award for Best Actress
1970	Una stagione all'inferno	Gennet	
1971	The Last Valley	Erica	
1971	A Lizard in a Woman's Skin	Carol Hammond	
1971	Incontro	Claudia Ridolfi	
1972	Le droit d'aimer	Helena	
1972	Don't Torture a Duckling	Maciara	
1972	The Master Touch	Anna	
1973	Dear Parents	Giulia Bonanni	David di Donatello Award for Best Actress
1973	A Brief Vacation	Clara Mataro	Los Angeles Film Critics Association Award for Best Actress; New York Film Critics Circle Awards (2nd Place)
1974	Love at the Top	Flora Danieli	
1974	Flavia the Heretic	Flavia Gaetani	
1975	Footprints on the Moon	Alice Cespi	
1975	Royal Flash	Lola Montez	
1975	The Day That Shook the World	Sophie Chotek	
1976	A Common Sense of Modesty	Loredana Davoli	
1978	Die Wölfin vom Teufelsmoor	Walpurga	
1978	The Last House on the Beach	Sister Cristina	
1979	Manaos	Manuela Aranda	
1981	Habibi, amor mío		
1983	Acqua e sapone	Wilma Walsh	
1983	Legati da tenera amicizia	Adelaide	
1985	The Trap	Hélène	
1988	Some Girls	Mrs. D'Arc	
1988	Prisoner of Rio	Stella	
1989	Portaritratto per signora		
1991	Millions	Margherita	
1994	Delitto passionale	Julia Yancheva	
1995	L'ombre du pharaon		
1998	Bela Donna	Mãe Ana	
2000	Eu Não Conhecia Tururu	Eleonora	Also writer, producer & director Nominated – Golden Kikito Award for Best Film
2003	Cattive inclinazioni	Mirta Valenti	
2020	Magari	Olga	

=== Television ===
Year	Title	Role	Notes
1978	The Word	Angela Monti	Miniseries
1984-86, 1995	La piovra	Olga Camastra	19 episodes
1986	Affari di famiglia	Lina Benetti	Television film
1987	A Rainha da Vida	Antônia Fidalgo / Jurema Matos	Television film
1989	La trappola		Television film
1990	Mademoiselle Ardel	Bianca di Falco	Television film
1992	Missione d'amore	Helena	Television film
1993	Cherchez la femme	Giovanna Bellocchi	Television film
1993	La voyageuse du soir	La baronne	Television film
1995	L'ombra abitata	Mme Labronsky	Television film
1998	Alice auf der Flucht	Elisabetta Mancini	Miniseries
1999	Shadows	Kalantan	Television film
2000	Un bacio nel buio	Aldina	Television film
2002	Incantesimo	Corinne Grasso	
2005	La notte breve	Magistrato	Television film

== Awards and nominations ==
Year	Institution	Award / Category	Work	Result
1969	David di Donatello Awards	Golden Plate	Metti, una sera a cena	Won
1969	David di Donatello Awards	Golden Plate	Una ragazza piuttosto complicata	Won
1971	David di Donatello Awards	David di Donatello Award for Best Actress	Anonimo veneziano	Won
1973	David di Donatello Awards	David di Donatello Award for Best Actress	Cari genitori	Won
1975	New York Film Critics Circle Awards	New York Film Critics Circle Award for Best Actress	Una breve vacanza	Runner-up
1975	Los Angeles Film Critics Association Awards	Los Angeles Film Critics Association Award for Best Actress	Una breve vacanza	Won
2000	Gramado Film Festival	Golden Kikito Award for Best Film	Eu Não Conhecia Tururu	Nominated
2002	Roseto First Work Festival	Career Rose	—N/a	Won
