= A Woman's Name =

2018 drama film

- Directed by: Marco Tullio Giordana
- Screenplay by: Cristiana Mainardi; Marco Tullio Giordana
- Produced by: Lionello Ceri
- Starring: Cristiana Capotondi; Valerio Binasco; Stefano Scandaletti; Michela Cescon; Bebo Storti; Adriana Asti
- Cinematography: Vincenzo Carpineta
- Edited by: Francesca Calvelli; Claudio Misantoni
- Music by: Dario Marianelli
- Release date: 2018
- Language: Italian

A Woman's Name (Italian: Nome di donna) is a 2018 Italian drama film co-written and directed by Marco Tullio Giordana and starring Cristiana Capotondi. For her performance in the film, Adriana Asti received a Nastro d'argento nomination for best supporting actress. The film also received two Globo d'oro nominations, for best actress (Capotondi) and best score (Dario Marianelli).

== Cast ==
- Cristiana Capotondi as Nina Martini
- Valerio Binasco as Marco Maria Torri
- Stefano Scandaletti as Luca
- Michela Cescon as Tina Della Rovere
- Bebo Storti as Don Roberto Ferrari
- Laura Marinoni as Arabella Rossi
- Anita Kravos as Alina
- Patrizia Piccinini as the Lawyer
- Patrizia Punzo as Franca Tozzi
- Vanessa Scalera as Sonia Talenti
- Linda Caridi as Cecilia Torri
- Adriana Asti as Ines
