= The Fall of the Rebel Angels (film) =

- Directed by: Marco Tullio Giordana
- Written by: Vincenzo Caretti; Mario Gallo; Marco Tullio Giordana
- Produced by: Mario Gallo; Enzo Giulioli
- Starring: Vittorio Mezzogiorno; Clio Goldsmith
- Cinematography: Giuseppe Pinori
- Edited by: Sergio Nuti
- Release date: 1981
- Language: Italian

The Fall of the Rebel Angels (Italian: La caduta degli angeli ribelli) is a 1981 Italian drama film written and directed by Marco Tullio Giordana. For her performance Alida Valli won the David di Donatello for best supporting actress.

== Plot ==
Cecilia, a young bourgeois, despite her comfortable life, leaves work, family and loved ones to follow a man whom she met by chance and who will later discover to be a terrorist isolated from his companions. But this life in constant flight is not for her, she will decide to end it with a dramatic choice.

== Cast ==
- Vittorio Mezzogiorno as Vittorio
- Clio Goldsmith as Cecilia
- Yves Beneyton as Giovanni
- Alida Valli as Bettina
- Francesca Rinaldi as Viola

== See also ==
- List of Italian films of 1981
