= Metti, una sera a cena =

1969 film

- Film poster
- Directed by: Giuseppe Patroni Griffi
- Written by: Dario Argento; Carlo Carunchio; Giuseppe Patroni Griffi (play)
- Starring: Jean-Louis Trintignant; Lino Capolicchio; Tony Musante; Florinda Bolkan
- Cinematography: Tonino Delli Colli
- Edited by: Franco Arcalli
- Music by: Ennio Morricone
- Release date: 3 April 1969
- Running time: 125 minutes
- Country: Italy
- Language: Italian

Metti, una sera a cena (a.k.a. "Love Circle", literally "Let's Say, an Evening for Dinner") is a 1969 Italian drama film directed by Giuseppe Patroni Griffi. It was entered into the 1969 Cannes Film Festival. The film was described as "a bourgeois comedy that trespassed conventional moral limits and presented a picture of—and encouraged—a new freedom of casual sexual relations."

Florinda Bolkan received a Targa d'oro and a Grolla d'oro for her performance in the film, while Ennio Morricone won the Nastro d'argento for the best original soundtrack in 1970.

== Plot ==
Michel is a successful bourgeois playwright who fantasizes an affair between his beautiful wife, Nina, and his best friend, Max, a bisexual actor. Unbeknownst to him, the pair have in fact been lovers for years, though Max is really in love with Michel. While Nina is occupied with Max, Michel drifts into an affair with a rich, but lonely, single woman. The four meet regularly for dinner at the home of Michel and Nina where they indulge in bored, amoral conversation.

As a diversion, Max suggests to Nina that they add a third player to their bedroom games: Ric, Max's anarchist/poet boyfriend who lives in a dankly luxurious basement and sells himself to both men and women. After a while, Ric finds himself falling in love with Nina and eventually attempts suicide over her. Nina discovers Ric in time to save him and decides to leave Michel to live with Ric. But soon their relationship withers and Nina returns to her husband. It's then that Michel decides to invite Ric into the circle, as they go on meeting at dinner and playing their games of love and seduction.

== Cast ==
- Jean-Louis Trintignant as Michel
- Lino Capolicchio as Ric
- Tony Musante as Max
- Florinda Bolkan as Nina
- Annie Girardot as Giovanna
- Silvia Monti as Actress at Press Conference
- Milly as Singer
- Adriana Asti as Stepdaughter
- Titina Maselli as Mother
- Ferdinando Scarfiotti as Son
- Claudio Carrozza as Baby
- Nora Ricci as 1st Actress
- Mariano Rigillo as Comedian
- Antonio Jaia as Young Actor

== Production ==
The production "consolidated [Dario Argento's] relationship with two individuals who would prove crucial to The Bird with the Crystal Plumage, actor Tony Musante (who would play Argento's protagonist, Sam Dalmas) and producer Goffrey Lombardo."

== Reception ==
Il Morandini writes about the film: "From a play [...] that somehow managed to suggest an existential desperation and the ash-flavoured erotic games. Here, in their perverse acrobatics and drawing-room suffering, the characters are the triumph of the fake. Well acted, though? Very well."

FilmTv.it stated: "Giuseppe Patroni Griffi brings one of his greatest theatrical successes to the screen, but the ambiguous family portrait of the original fades into the film's self-serving aestheticism. Beautiful, but Pirelli calendar-like, are the erotic images photographed by Tonino Delli Colli."

The film is also remembered for Ennio Morricone's original soundtrack.

== Awards ==
- 1969 - Festival de Cannes
  - Palme d'Or nomination
- 1969 - David di Donatello
  - Targa d'oro: Florinda Bolkan- won
- 1969 - Grolla d'oro
  - Best actress: Florinda Bolkan-won
- 1970 - Nastro d'argento
  - Best soundtrack: Ennio Morricone-won
