= To Love the Damned =

1980 film

- Directed by: Marco Tullio Giordana
- Written by: Vincenzo Caretti; Marco Tullio Giordana
- Produced by: Elda Ferri; Mario Gallo
- Starring: Flavio Bucci
- Cinematography: Giuseppe Pinori
- Edited by: Sergio Nuti
- Release date: 27 August 1980
- Running time: 84 minutes
- Country: Italy
- Language: Italian

To Love the Damned (Italian: Maledetti vi amerò) is a 1980 Italian drama film directed by Marco Tullio Giordana. It competed in the Un Certain Regard section at the 1980 Cannes Film Festival. It won the Golden Leopard award at the Locarno International Film Festival in 1980.

== Cast ==
- Flavio Bucci as Riccardo, aka Svitol
- Biagio Pelligra as Police Commissioner
- Micaela Pignatelli as Letizia
- Alfredo Pea as Vincenzo
- Anna Miserocchi as the mother
- Agnès Nobecourt as Guya
- Pasquale Zito
- Massimo Jacoboni
- Franco Bizzoccoli as Partigiano
- Stefano Manca di Villahermosa as Carlino
- David Riondino as Beniamino
