= Dear Parents =

1973 Italian film by Enrico Maria Salerno

- Directed by: Enrico Maria Salerno
- Written by: Bruno Di Geronimo; Marco Leto; Enrico Maria Salerno; Lina Wertmüller
- Produced by: Carlo Ponti
- Starring: Florinda Bolkan; Maria Schneider; Catherine Spaak
- Cinematography: Dario Di Palma
- Edited by: Mario Morra
- Music by: Riz Ortolani
- Release date: 1973
- Language: Italian

Dear Parents (Italian: Cari genitori) is a 1973 Italian drama film directed by Enrico Maria Salerno. For this film Florinda Bolkan was awarded with a David di Donatello for Best Actress.

== Plot ==
An Italian woman travels to London to visit her estranged daughter.

== Cast ==
- Florinda Bolkan: Giulia Bonanni
- Catherine Spaak: Madeleine
- Maria Schneider: Antonia
- Tom Baker: Karl
- Malcolm Stoddard: Joe
- Jean Anderson: Mrs. Ward
- Spencer Banks
