= Martin Elfand =

American film producer

Martin Elfand (born 1937) is an American film producer. Born in Los Angeles, California. Elfand began his career as a talent agent with CMA, representing Candice Bergen and Al Pacino. He then developed a working relationship with Martin Bregman. In November 1976 he became executive vice president in charge of production at Warner Bros. In the 2000s he was involved in a legal dispute with Warner Brothers over unpaid video royalties from many of his 70s and 80s hit films.

== Producer credits ==
He was a producer in all films unless otherwise noted.

=== Film ===
Year	Film	Credit
1972	Kansas City Bomber	
1975	Dog Day Afternoon	
1980	It's My Turn	
1982	An Officer and a Gentleman	
1985	King David	
1988	Clara's Heart	
1989	Her Alibi	Executive producer
1991	Talent for the Game	
