= Appointment in Liverpool =

1988 film by Marco Tullio Giordana

- Directed by: Marco Tullio Giordana
- Written by: Leone Colonna; Marco Tullio Giordana; Luciano Manuzzi
- Produced by: Claudio Bonivento
- Starring: Isabella Ferrari; John Steiner; Nigel Court
- Cinematography: Roberto Forges Davanzati
- Music by: Carlo Crivelli
- Distributed by: Variety Distribution
- Release date: 1988
- Country: Italy
- Language: Italian

Appointment in Liverpool (Italian: Appuntamento a Liverpool) is a 1988 Italian drama film co-written and directed by Marco Tullio Giordana.

== Plot ==
Caterina is a twenty-year-old girl from Cremona: her father died before her eyes in Brussels, a victim of the Heysel Stadium disaster. A British police inspector, determined to bring to justice all those responsible, after several years summons her again as an eyewitness as new elements have emerged. Caterina recognizes the murderer, a Liverpool taxi driver, but she prefers to remain silent as to track down the man in his hometown and take her revenge.

== Cast ==
- Isabella Ferrari as Caterina Dossena
- John Steiner as British Police Inspector
- Valeria Ciangottini as Anna, Caterina's mother
- Nigel Court as The Hooligan
- Roberta Lena as Tiziana
- Marne Maitland as Pilar
- Vittorio Amandola as Italian Commissioner
- Ugo Conti as The Mechanic
