= Investigation of a Citizen Above Suspicion =

1970 Italian crime drama film

- Italian film poster
- Italian: Indagine su un cittadino al di sopra di ogni sospetto
- Directed by: Elio Petri
- Screenplay by: Elio Petri; Ugo Pirro
- Produced by: Daniele Senatore; Marina Cicogna
- Starring: Gian Maria Volonté; Florinda Bolkan; Gianni Santuccio; Orazio Orlando; Sergio Tramonti; Arturo Dominici; Salvo Randone
- Cinematography: Luigi Kuveiller
- Edited by: Ruggero Mastroianni
- Music by: Ennio Morricone
- Production company: Vera Film
- Distributed by: Euro International Films (Italy); Columbia Pictures (International)
- Release date: 9 February 1970 (Italy)
- Running time: 115 minutes
- Country: Italy
- Language: Italian
- Box office: ₤1.928 billion

Investigation of a Citizen Above Suspicion (Italian: Indagine su un cittadino al di sopra di ogni sospetto) is a 1970 Italian satirical crime thriller film directed by Elio Petri, starring Gian Maria Volonté and Florinda Bolkan. It is a psychological, black-humored satire on corruption in high office, telling the story of a top police officer who kills his mistress, and then tests whether the police would charge him for this crime. He begins manipulating the investigation by planting obvious clues while the other police officers ignore them, either intentionally or not.

The film was released in Italy by Euro International Pictures on 9 February 1970, to widespread acclaim from critics. It won the Jury Prize at the 1970 Cannes Film Festival, and the David di Donatello Awards for Best Film and Best Actor (Gian Maria Volonté). In the United States, it won the Oscar for Best Foreign Language Film. Petri and his co-writer Ugo Pirro were nominated for Best Original Screenplay.

In 2008, the film was included on the Italian Ministry of Cultural Heritage’s 100 Italian films to be saved, a list of 100 films that "have changed the collective memory of the country between 1942 and 1978."

== Plot ==
A recently promoted police inspector, nicknamed "Il Dottore" ("the Doctor", an Italian honorific) kills his mistress, and then covers up his involvement in the crime. He insinuates himself into the investigation, planting clues to steer his subordinate officers toward a series of other suspects, including the victim's gay husband and a student leftist radical. He then exonerates the other suspects and leads the investigators toward himself to prove that he is "above suspicion" and can get away with anything, even while being investigated.

His personal neurosis caused by his extreme position of power, and his firm beliefs in the role of authority, eventually drive him to try to accuse himself with every possible evidence. The only witness of his presence at the victim's apartment, the anarchist Antonio Pace, refuses to accuse him to be able to prove the inherent criminal nature of power ("A criminal leading the repression, it is perfect!"). The Doctor eventually desperately confesses to the crime in front of his superiors, in an effort to not subvert the essence of authority, but they all refuse to believe him, forcing him to recant his confession, with the approval of the police commissioner.

The interrogation at his home is revealed to be a dream sequence, and when he wakes up the commissioner and other colleagues actually arrive at his place; however, the outcome of their confrontation is not revealed, and the film ends with a quote by Franz Kafka about the paradoxical nature of power.

== Cast ==
- Gian Maria Volonté as "Il Dottore" ('the Doctor'), the Police Inspector
- Florinda Bolkan as Augusta Terzi
- Gianni Santuccio as the Police Commissioner
- Orazio Orlando as Brigadier Biglia
- Sergio Tramonti as Antonio Pace
- Salvo Randone as the Plumber
- Arturo Dominici as Mangani
- Aldo Rendine as Nicola Panunzio
- Massimo Foschi as Claudio Terzi
- Vittorio Duse as Canes
- Aleka Paizi as the Housekeeper
- Pino Patti as the Wiretapping Supervisor
- Gianfranco Barra as Agent Giusti

== Release ==
Investigation of a Citizen Above Suspicion was released in Italy on February 9, 1970, where it was distributed by Euro International Films.

== Reception ==
=== Box office ===
In Italy, the film had a domestic gross of 1,928,248,000 Italian lire.

=== Critical response ===
Investigation of a Citizen Above Suspicion was well received by critics and is widely considered one of the best European films of the 1970s. The New York Times called the film "a suspense melodrama with the moral concerns of angry satire [...] When it opened in Italy early this year (and later, when it was shown at Cannes), Investigation was hailed for the ways in which it exposed the corrupt, authoritarian practices of the police, who place themselves above their own laws [...] The story moves forward with a relentless momentum. It is a political parable, and a stunning movie."

The film has a Rotten Tomatoes approval of 100% based on 15 reviews, with an average score of 8/10. On Metacritic, it has a score of 89 out of 100 based on 10 reviews, indicating "universal acclaim".

David Fear of Time Out called it "[a] paranoid police procedural, a perverse parable about the corrupting elements of power, and a candidate for the greatest predated Patriot Act movie ever [...]". Kenneth Turan called the film "as troubling today as when it came out in 1970. Maybe more so."

=== Accolades ===
The film was highly regarded in its own time, winning the Academy Award for Best Foreign Language Film, and both the FIPRESCI Prize and the Grand Prize at the 1970 Cannes Film Festival. Also it won the Edgar Award for Best Motion Picture from the Mystery Writers of America.

== Cancelled remake ==
The Cannon Group had hoped to remake the original film with Andrei Konchalovsky (of Runaway Train fame) attached to direct. Paul Schrader was attached to write, as he wrote both a story treatment and a screenplay. It was going to have either Al Pacino or Christopher Walken to star. Originally, Cannon released an ad, planning to shoot in October 1987, and premiere it at Cannes in 1988, although it never got made, and it was shelved. It remained shelved until the 90s, when it was resurrected by Jodie Foster's production company Egg Pictures. Sidney Lumet was attached to direct, but the film never made it beyond pre-production.

== See also ==
- List of submissions to the 43rd Academy Awards for Best Foreign Language Film
- List of Italian submissions for the Academy Award for Best Foreign Language Film
- Poliziotteschi
