= 1975 Los Angeles Film Critics Association Awards =

Annual US film awards ceremony

1st LAFCA Awards
- Date: February 24, 1976

Highlights
- Best Picture: Dog Day Afternoon and One Flew Over the Cuckoo's Nest (tie)

The 1st Los Angeles Film Critics Association Awards, given by the Los Angeles Film Critics Association (LAFCA) at Pip's restaurant in Beverly Hills on February 24, 1976, honored the best in film for 1975.

== Winners ==
- Best Picture (tie):
  - Dog Day Afternoon
  - One Flew Over the Cuckoo's Nest
- Best Director:
  - Sidney Lumet – Dog Day Afternoon
- Best Actor:
  - Al Pacino – Dog Day Afternoon
- Best Actress:
  - Florinda Bolkan – A Brief Vacation (Una breve vacanza)
- Best Screenplay:
  - Joan Tewkesbury – Nashville
- Best Cinematography:
  - John Alcott – Barry Lyndon
- Best Foreign Film:
  - And Now My Love (Toute une vie) • France/Italy
- Special Citation:
  - Love Among the Ruins
