= Tony Musante =

American actor (1936–2013)

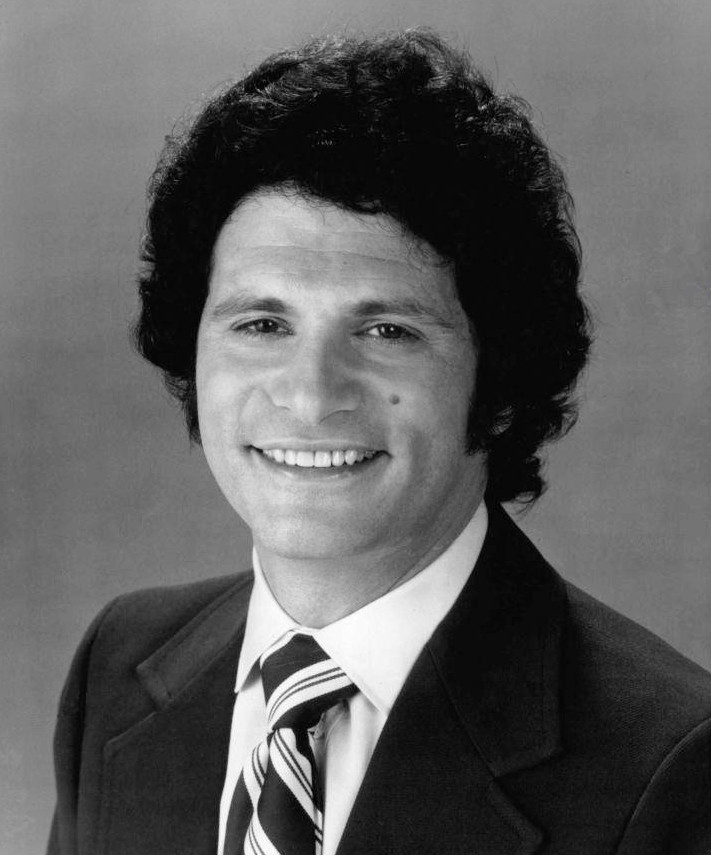
- Musante in 1973
- Born: Anthony Peter Musante Jr. June 30, 1936; Bridgeport, Connecticut, U.S.
- Died: November 26, 2013 (aged 77); Manhattan, New York, U.S.
- Occupation: Actor
- Years active: 1956–2013
- Spouse: Jane Sparkes (m. 1962)

Anthony Peter Musante Jr. (June 30, 1936 – November 26, 2013) was an American actor, best known for the TV series Toma as Detective David Toma, Nino Schibetta in Oz (1997), and Joe D'Angelo in As the World Turns (2000–2003). In movies, he achieved fame relatively early in his career, starring or having significant roles in such films as Once a Thief (1965), The Incident (1967), The Detective (1968) and The Last Run (1971), and also in a number of Italian productions, including The Mercenary (1968), Metti, una sera a cena (1969) and The Bird with the Crystal Plumage (1970).

== Life and career ==
Musante was born in Bridgeport, Connecticut, into an Italian-American family, the son of Natalie Anne (née Salerno), a school teacher, and Anthony Peter Musante, an accountant. He attended Oberlin College and Northwestern University.

Musante acted in numerous feature films, in the United States and elsewhere, including Italy. His television work included the 1973 television series Toma (predecessor to Baretta) and the soap opera As the World Turns. He was nominated for a Drama Desk Award for his performance in the 1975 Broadway play P. S. Your Cat Is Dead!. He was also seen on Broadway in a double-bill of Tennessee Williams's 27 Wagons Full of Cotton and Arthur Miller's A Memory of Two Mondays and in Edward Albee's The Lady from Dubuque, and off-Broadway in Terrence McNally's Frankie and Johnny in the Clair de Lune.

Toma did well in the ratings despite tough opposition, but Musante insisted upon leaving the series after one year, as was permitted by his contract. The series was revised as Baretta, with Robert Blake in the lead role, and it was a success. At the time of his death, The New York Times referred to Toma as "the show that got away." But Musante never regretted leaving the series, despite sacrificing money and fame.

He was nominated for an Emmy Award for his work in a 1975 episode of Medical Center, A Quality of Mercy. Musante also played Nino Schibetta, a feared Mafia boss and the Italian gang leader inside of Emerald City during the first season of the HBO television series Oz.

== Death ==
Musante died of a hemorrhage following oral surgery on November 26, 2013, aged 77, in Manhattan.

== Filmography ==
=== Film ===
- Once a Thief (1965) – Cleveland 'Cleve' Shoenstein
- The Incident (1967) – Joe Ferrone
- The Detective (1968) – Felix
- The Mercenary (Italy, 1968) – Paco Román
- Metti, una sera a cena (Italy, 1969) – Max
- The Bird with the Crystal Plumage (Italy, 1970) – Sam Dalmas
- The Anonymous Venetian (Italy, 1970) – Enrico
- Grissom Gang (1971) – Eddie Hagan
- The Last Run (1971) – Paul Rickard
- Il caso Pisciotta (The Pisciotta Case) (Italy, 1972) – Francesco Scauri
- Goodbye & Amen (Italy, 1978) – John Dhannay
- Break Up (Italy, 1978) – Paolo Naviase
- Notturno (Italy, 1983) – Jurek Rudinski
- The Pope of Greenwich Village (1984) – Pete
- The Trap (Italy, 1985) – Michael Parker
- The Repenter (Italy, 1985) – Vanni Ragusa
- The Deep End of the Ocean (1999) – Angelo Cappadora
- The Yards (2000) – Seymour Korman
- Life as It Comes (Italy, 2003) – Karl, the Professor
- Promessa d'amore (Italy, 2004) – Amilcare
- We Own the Night (2007) – Jack Shapiro

=== Television ===
Tony Musante television credits
Year	Title	Role	Notes
1963	The DuPont Show of the Week	Joe Ferrone	Episode: "Ride with Terror"
1964	Bob Hope Presents the Chrysler Theatre	Major DeGuisado	Episode: "A Wind of Hurricane Force"
1964	Alfred Hitchcock Presents	Candle	Episode: "Memo from Purgatory"
1965	The Trials of O'Brien	Coley Thomas	Episode: "Bargain Day on the Street of Regret"
1966	The Trials of O'Brien	Callison	Episode: "The Blue Steel Suite"
1966	The Fugitive	Billy Karnes	Episode: "The Blessings of Liberty"
1973	Marcus Welby, M.D.	David	Episode: "The Tall Tree"
1973–1974	Toma	Det. David Toma	23 episodes
1974	Police Story	Joe Bosic	Episode: "Fathers and Sons"
1975	Judgment: The Court Martial of Lieutenant William Calley	Lt. William Calley	TV movie
1975	The Rockford Files	Charlie Harris	Episode: "Charlie Harris at Large"
1975	The Desperate Miles	Joe Larkin	TV movie
1975	Medical Story	Dr. Paul Brandon	Episode: "The God Syndrome"
1975	Police Story	Sgt. Vince Della Maggiori	Episode: "Breaking Point"
1976	Medical Story	Dr. Hoffman	Episode: "The Quality of Mercy"
1976	Origins of the Mafia	Michele Borello	TV miniseries. Italy
1976	Police Story	Jack Mitchell	Episode: "The Other Side of the Badge"
1977	Nowhere to Hide	Joey Faber	TV movie
1978	My Husband Is Missing	Derek Mackenzie	TV movie
1979	Breaking Up Is Hard to Do	Sal Falcone	TV movie
1979	The Thirteenth Day: The Story of Esther	King Ahasuerus	TV movie
1980	High Ice	Lt. Col. Harris Thatcher	TV movie
1982	American Playhouse	George	Episode: "Weekend"
1984	Rearview Mirror	Vince Martino	TV movie
1985	MacGruder and Loud	Caferelli	Episode: Pilot
1986	The Equalizer	John Parker	Episode: "Pretenders"
1987	Nutcracker: Money, Madness and Murder	Vittorio	TV miniseries
1987	Night Heat	Roy Barnett	Episode: "Grace"
1988	La collina del diavolo	Daniele	TV movie. Italy
1989	Jesse Hawkes		Episode: "Little Girl Lost"
1989	Appuntamento a Trieste	Kirk Mesana	TV miniseries. Italy
1995	Il barone	Baron Sajeva	TV miniseries. Italy
1997	Deep Family Secrets	Lennox	TV movie
1997	Oz	Nino Schibetta	7 episodes
1997	Nothing Sacred	Gary	Episode: "Song of Songs"
1998	Exiled: A Law & Order Movie	Don Giancarlo Uzielli	TV movie
1998	Acapulco H.E.A.T.	Rocco Santora	Episode: "Code Name Million Dollar Man"
1999	The Seventh Scroll	Duraid Al Simma	TV miniseries
2000	Un bacio nel buio		TV miniseries. Italy
2000–2003	As the World Turns	Joe D'Angelo	4 episodes
2001	100 Centre Street	Albert Esposito	2 episodes
2004	Traffic	Alex Edmonds	TV miniseries
2007	Pompeii	Alpius	TV miniseries. Italy
2013	Pupetta – Il coraggio e la passione	Don Luigi Vitiello	TV miniseries. Italy
