= John Wojtowicz =

American bank robber (1945–2006)

- Wojtowicz during the 1972 bank robbery
- Born: John Stanley Joseph Wojtowicz; March 9, 1945; New York City, U.S.
- Died: January 2, 2006 (aged 60); New York City, U.S.
- Spouses: Carmen Bifulco (m. 1967; div. 1969); Elizabeth Eden (m. 1971)
- Children: 2
- Conviction: Bank robbery
- Penalty: 20 years imprisonment, served five years

John Stanley Joseph Wojtowicz (/vɔɪˈtoʊvɪtʃ/ voy-TOE-vitch; March 9, 1945 – January 2, 2006) was an American bank robber whose story inspired the film Dog Day Afternoon.

== Early life ==
Wojtowicz was the son of a Polish father and an Italian-American mother, née Terry Basso.

== Personal life ==
Wojtowicz married Carmen Bifulco in 1967. Shortly thereafter Wojtowicz joined the military and served in Vietnam. Wojtowicz and Bifulco had two children and separated in 1969.

In 1971, Wojtowicz met Elizabeth Eden. The two had a public wedding ceremony that year.

Wojtowicz was at some point a member of the Gay Activists Alliance. He used at that time the alias "Littlejohn Basso", Basso being his mother's maiden name.

== Bank robbery ==
On August 22, 1972, Wojtowicz, along with Salvatore Naturile and Robert Westenberg, attempted to rob a branch of the Chase Manhattan Bank at 450 Avenue P in Gravesend, Brooklyn. Westenberg fled the scene before the robbery got underway after he saw a police car on the street. Rather than quickly obtaining the money and fleeing as planned, Wojtowicz and Naturile ended up holding seven Chase Manhattan bank employees hostage for fourteen hours. Wojtowicz, a former bank teller, had some knowledge of bank operations.

Naturile was killed by an FBI agent during the final moments of the incident. Wojtowicz was arrested.

An article in the Los Angeles Times reported that the heist was meant to pay for Eden's gender-affirming sexual reassignment surgery (male-to-female). However, veteran Village Voice columnist Arthur Bell, who knew Wojtowicz and was tangentially involved in the hostage negotiations, reported that paying for Eden's surgery was only peripheral to the real motive. The attempted heist was, Bell stated, a Mafia operation that went horribly wrong.

== Aftermath ==
According to Wojtowicz, he was offered a deal for pleading guilty, which the court did not honor. On April 23, 1973, he was sentenced to 20 years in Lewisburg Federal Penitentiary, of which he served five.

Wojtowicz was released from prison on April 10, 1978. He was arrested again and served two more prison sentences for parole violations in 1984 and 1986. He was released in April 1987. Eden visited Wojtowicz in New York about once a month.

Eden, who married and divorced during the time Wojtowicz was imprisoned, died of AIDS-related pneumonia at Genesee Hospital, in Rochester, New York, on September 29, 1987. Wojtowicz attended her funeral and delivered a eulogy.

=== Dog Day Afternoon ===
Wojtowicz's story was used as the basis for the 1975 film Dog Day Afternoon starring Al Pacino as Wojtowicz (called "Sonny Wortzik" in the film) and John Cazale, one of Pacino's co-stars in The Godfather, as Naturile. Elizabeth Eden, known as "Leon" in the film, was portrayed by actor Chris Sarandon.

In 1975, Wojtowicz wrote a letter to The New York Times out of concern that people would believe the movie version of the events, which he said was only 30% accurate. Wojtowicz's main objection was the inaccurate portrayal of his wife Carmen Bifulco as a plain, overweight woman whose behavior led to his relationship with Eden when, in fact, he had left Bifulco two years before he met Eden.

Other concerns he had had, that were fictionalized in the movie, were that he never spoke to his mother and that the police refused to let him speak to his wife Carmen. In addition, the movie insinuated that Wojtowicz had "sold out" Naturile to the police. Wojtowicz claimed that this was untrue; however, several attempts were still made on his life following a showing of the film in his prison.

Wojtowicz praised Pacino's and Sarandon's characterizations of himself and Elizabeth Eden as accurate. In a 2006 interview, the movie's screenwriter, Frank Pierson, said that he tried to visit Wojtowicz in prison many times to get more details about his story when he wrote the screenplay, but Wojtowicz refused to see him because he felt he was not paid enough money for the rights to his story. Either way, the film was very successful, receiving good reviews and won the Academy Award for Best Original Screenplay at the 48th Academy Awards in 1976.

== Later years and death ==
In 2001, The New York Times reported that Wojtowicz was living on welfare in Brooklyn. He died of cancer on January 2, 2006, at his mother's home, aged 60.

== Documentaries ==
Wojtowicz was the subject of multiple documentaries:

- The Third Memory (1999), directed by artist Pierre Huyghe and first exhibited in a museum context at the Centre Georges Pompidou in Paris and The Renaissance Society in Chicago, in the format of a two-channel video, took Dog Day Afternoon as its starting point. It depicts Wojtowicz recreating the events of the bank robbery with actor look-a-likes and props on a reconstruction of the set of Lumet's film. Juxtaposed with footage from Dog Day Afternoon, it demonstrates that Wojtowicz's memory appears to have been irrevocably altered by the film about his life. For example, he speculated that President Richard Nixon personally ordered the FBI killing of Salvatore, because live news media coverage following the bank robbery that evening was cutting into the network television broadcast of Nixon's re-election acceptance speech at the 1972 Republican National Convention, at The Convention Center in Miami Beach.
- Based on a True Story (2004)
- The Dog (also known as Storyville: The Great Sex Addict Heist), by directors Allison Berg and Frank Keraudren, premiered at the Toronto International Film Festival in September 2013.
