= Dog Day Afternoon =

1975 American crime drama film by Sidney Lumet

- Theatrical release poster
- Directed by: Sidney Lumet
- Screenplay by: Frank Pierson
- Story by: Thomas Moore
- Based on: "The Boys in the Bank"; 1972 Life article by: P. F. Kluge; Thomas Moore
- Produced by: Martin Bregman; Martin Elfand
- Starring: Al Pacino; John Cazale; James Broderick; Charles Durning
- Cinematography: Victor J. Kemper
- Edited by: Dede Allen
- Production company: Artists Entertainment Complex
- Distributed by: Warner Bros.
- Release dates: September 20, 1975 (San Sebastián); September 21, 1975 (United States)
- Running time: 125 minutes
- Country: United States
- Language: English
- Budget: $3.5–$3.8 million
- Box office: $50–56 million

Dog Day Afternoon is a 1975 American biographical crime drama film directed by Sidney Lumet and produced by Martin Bregman and Martin Elfand. The film stars Al Pacino, John Cazale, James Broderick and Charles Durning. The screenplay is written by Frank Pierson and is based on the Life magazine article "The Boys in the Bank" by P. F. Kluge and Thomas Moore. The feature chronicles the 1972 robbery and hostage situation led by John Wojtowicz and Salvatore Naturile at a Chase Manhattan branch in Brooklyn.

Elfand brought the article to Bregman's attention, who proceeded to negotiate a deal with Warner Bros. Pictures and clear the rights to use the story. Pierson conducted his research and wrote a script that centered on the story of the robbery around Wojtowicz. The cast was selected by Lumet and Pacino, with the latter selecting past co-stars from his off-Broadway plays. Filming took place between September and November 1974, and the production was finished three weeks ahead of schedule.

When theatrically released on September 21, 1975, Dog Day Afternoon was a critical and box-office success. The film was nominated for seven Golden Globe Awards, six BAFTAs (winning Best Actor for Pacino and Best Editing), and six Academy Awards (winning Best Original Screenplay). In 2009, Dog Day Afternoon was deemed "culturally, historically, or aesthetically significant" by the Library of Congress, and was selected for preservation in the National Film Registry.

== Plot ==
On August 22, 1972, first-time crook Sonny Wortzik and his friends Salvatore "Sal" Naturile and Stevie attempt to rob the First Brooklyn Savings Bank. The plan immediately goes awry when Stevie loses his nerve and flees. Sonny discovers they arrived after the daily cash pickup which left only $1,100 in cash at the bank. Sonny takes the bank's traveler's checks and burns the register in a trash can. When smoke raises suspicion outside, the building is surrounded by police. The two panicked robbers take the bank employees hostage.

Police Detective Sergeant Eugene Moretti calls the bank, and Sonny threatens to kill the hostages. Sal assures Sonny he is ready to kill if necessary. Sonny releases an asthmatic security guard as a display of good faith. Moretti convinces Sonny to negotiate outside, and their dialogue culminates in Sonny's shouting "Attica!" to cheers from the crowd.

Sonny lists his demands: a vehicle to the airport so they can board a jet, pizzas for the hostages, and to see his wife at the bank. Sonny's lover Leon Shermer reveals the robbery was intended to pay for Leon's gender reassignment surgery and that Sonny has children with estranged wife Angie.

The bank's lights shut off when FBI agent Sheldon takes command of the scene. He refuses to discuss additional requests. Sheldon convinces Leon to talk to Sonny on the phone. Leon had been hospitalized at Bellevue Hospital after a suicide attempt. Leon turns down Sonny's offer to join in their escape. Sonny tells the police Leon wasn't involved with the robbery.

Sonny agrees to let the bank's director Mulvaney leave due to his diabetic shock, but he refuses to leave his employees. Sonny comes outside to talk to his mother, who fails to persuade him to surrender, then dictates his will to one of the hostages. He arranges for his life insurance to go to Angie and Leon.

Agent Murphy drives Sonny, Sal and the remaining hostages to Kennedy Airport in a limousine. As they wait in the car for their plane to taxi, Sal releases another hostage. Sheldon seizes Sonny's weapon, Murphy shoots Sal in the head with a hidden revolver, Sonny is immediately arrested, and the hostages are freed, while Sal's body is wheeled away.

In the aftermath of the film's events, Sonny is sentenced to twenty years in prison, leaving Angie and her children to subsist on welfare. Leon lives as a woman in New York City.

== Cast ==
- Al Pacino as Sonny Wortzik (based on John Wojtowicz)
- John Cazale as Sal Naturile (Salvatore Naturile)
- Charles Durning as Sergeant Eugene Moretti (Louis C. Cottell)
- Chris Sarandon as Leon Shermer (Elizabeth Eden)
- Penelope Allen as Sylvia 'Mouth' (Shirley "Mouth" Ball)
- Sully Boyar as Mulvaney (Robert Barrett)
- Susan Peretz as Angie (Carmen Wojtowicz)
- James Broderick as FBI Special Agent Sheldon (Richard J. Baker)
- Lance Henriksen as FBI Special Agent Murphy (James Murphy)
- Carol Kane as Jenny 'The Squirrel'
- Beulah Garrick as Margaret
- Sandra Kazan as Deborah
- Estelle Omens as Edna (Josephine Tuttino)
- Marcia Jean Kurtz as Miriam
- Amy Levitt as Maria
- Gary Springer as Stevie (Robert Westenberg)
- John Marriott as Howard (Calvin Jones)
- Philip Charles MacKenzie as the doctor
- Dick Anthony Williams as the Limo Driver / Undercover FBI Agent
- Judith Malina as Sonny's mother (Theresa Basso-Wojtowicz)
- Dominic Chianese as Sonny's father
- Edwin "Chu Chu" Malave as Maria's boyfriend

== Production ==
=== Background ===
On August 22, 1972, John Wojtowicz, Salvatore Naturile and Robert Westenberg attempted to rob a branch of the Chase Manhattan Bank at 450 Avenue P in Gravesend, Brooklyn. The robbers aimed to take the US$150,000–$200,000 (equivalent to $1.5 million in 2025) that they expected to be delivered at 3:30 p.m. that afternoon by an armored truck. According to Wojtowicz, a Chase Manhattan executive that he met at a gay bar in Greenwich Village tipped him off. They entered the bank at 3:00 p.m. to discover that the armored truck had instead taken the money away at 11:00 a.m. The robbers took the $29,000 (equivalent to $223,200 in 2025) that was available at the branch and tried to escape. Westenberg was successful, but Wojtowicz and Naturile were left behind as the police arrived on the scene. The robbery then turned into a hostage situation.

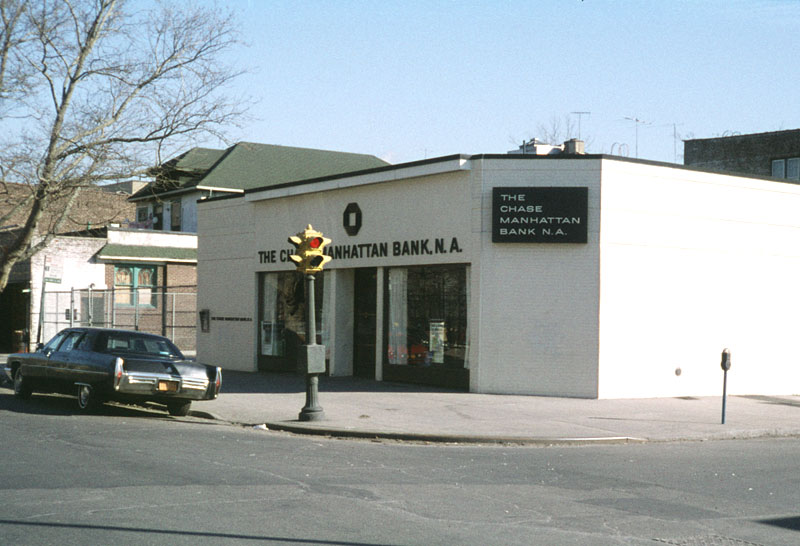
The Chase branch in 1975

Two hours into the negotiations, Wojtowicz and Naturile extended a list of demands to the police: release Elizabeth Eden (Ernest Aron) from Kings County Hospital Center in exchange for a hostage, bring hamburgers and Coca-Cola, and provide transportation to John F. Kennedy International Airport for them and the hostages. In the words of Wojtowicz: "I want them to deliver my wife here from King's County hospital. His name is Ernest Aron. It's a guy. I'm gay." They also requested a plane to fly to a safe location, where the unharmed hostages were to be released. After more than fourteen hours of holding the hostages, Naturile was killed, and Wojtowicz was arrested at Kennedy Airport.

Wojtowicz told Judge Anthony J. Travia that the motive for the robbery was to pay for a sexual reassignment surgery for Eden. Shortly after a suicide attempt in 1971, Eden expressed to Father Gennaro Aurichio the desire to marry Wojtowicz. Aurichio recalled Eden told him, "I'm all mixed up. I want to be a girl. I have to marry the boy I introduced you to. If I don't, I'll be more successful next time." Aurichio, who counseled Eden, agreed to perform a ceremony. He told Eden that he would "perform a blessing" but that he was unable and unwilling to "perform a homosexual marriage". Aurichio was subsequently defrocked. Arthur Bell, an investigative journalist, expressed his belief that the surgery was a peripheral motive for the robbery. Bell met Wojtowicz before the hold up through the Gay Activists Alliance, under the alias of "Littlejohn Basso". In his article published by The Village Voice, he laid out Wojtowicz's connection to pornographer Mike Umbers and proposed that the heist was organized by the Gambino crime family instead.

=== Development ===
Life published in its September 22, 1972, issue a chronicle of the robbery. The feature, written by P. F. Kluge and Thomas Moore, was titled "The Boys in the Bank". It detailed the holdup and the hostages' eventual fraternization with their captors. The authors compared Wojtowicz's appearance to that of Dustin Hoffman or Al Pacino. The feature caught the attention of producer Martin Elfand. Elfand took it to Martin Bregman, who piqued the interest of Warner Bros. Pictures executive Richard Shepherd. Elfand hired Kluge and Moore to interview the people involved in the story. Before the script was written, Elfand wanted to ensure that he had signed releases by all the interviewees for the story rights. After the negotiation, each hostage received $600 (equivalent to $4,400 in 2025); one hostage asked for more money and was not included in the script.

Initially, Westenberg was offered $2,000, but he turned it down following the advice of his lawyer, because he was still serving a two-year sentence. After his release, he settled for $750. Wojtowicz received $7,500 (equivalent to $54,400 in 2025) for the rights to the story. From the money, he earmarked $2,500 to Eden's reassignment surgery.

News outlets reported that Wojtowicz was granted one percent of the film's net profit; Bregman later denied that his company, Artists Entertainment Complex, granted Wojtowicz a percentage of the gross. Bregman added he would give him $25,000 if the film performed as well as Serpico (1973) at the box office. Wojtowicz's lawyer Mark Landsman retained $3,500 of the payment he received. Meanwhile, Warner Bros. paid for Naturile's funeral. The working title of the film was The Boys in the Bank. The budget was set at an estimate of $3.8 million (equivalent to $27.56 million in 2025).

Frank Pierson was hired to write the screenplay. Aside from Kluge and Moore's research, Pierson conducted his own. He contacted journalist Randy Wicker, who covered the story of the heist for gay publications, and provided technical assistance regarding Manhattan's gay nightclub scene. Pierson decided that he wanted to center the story around Wojtowicz, who refused to receive Pierson in prison while he was in a financial dispute with Warner Bros.

Pierson analyzed the tapes of the interviews and news articles about the robbery, and approached those involved for additional information. Pierson could not define Wojtowicz's character because a different impression was left on each of the interviewees. The project overwhelmed him, but he could not quit because he had spent his cash in advance. Pierson reviewed his material and found that the unfulfilled promises Wojtowicz made was the common trait. Pierson viewed them as "the story of the bank", and the failure of the robbery.

Pierson finished the screenplay by Christmas 1973.

=== Tie-In Novel ===
Pierson had not completed the script when author Leslie Waller was engaged to write the tie-in novel; thus Waller was given only a screen treatment and partial draft of the script from which to work. In order to give fullest dimension possible to characters and story, Waller did his own research and crafted his own approach as Pierson simultaneously and independently finished the script, which is why the novel and the film are often substantially different from one another. Originally published in hardcover by Delacorte Press and packaged to look like an original novel rather than one extrapolated in part from a screenplay, the book was released almost a year before the film, under the pseudonym "Patrick Mann." It was subsequently released in paperback by Dell Publishing just prior to the film's release.

=== Casting ===
With the finished script, Martin Bregman met with director Sidney Lumet and star Al Pacino in London. Pacino, who, at the time, was represented by Bregman, agreed to play the role.

Pacino backed out, and Dustin Hoffman expressed interest. Bregman did not meet with Hoffman; he felt that Pacino could bring the "sensitivity" and "vulnerability" needed for the role. After more discussion, Pacino accepted the part but rejected it again. Bregman attributed it to Pacino's use of method acting and said that it "might have been a world [Pacino] did not want to explore". Bregman added that "no major star had ever played a gay".

But he wanted to make the film with Pacino. The actor backed out of the project a third time, and told Bregman that he wanted to return to the theater. He said that he would "never make the adjustment necessary for the movies". Pacino again returned to the project, and attributed his behavior to stress and drinking, and that he needed "a life outside work". Lumet mentioned the characterization of Sonny Wortzik's (Wojtowicz) "insane framework of life" as the stress factor for Pacino. In a meeting before the rehearsals, Pacino asked Pierson and Lumet to tone down Sonny Wortzik's behavior; his request was rejected. Eden described Wojtowicz as "a very domineering person", and added: "he is good-natured ... but sometimes went overboard ... and he terrified me". Wicker later said that the screenplay of Dog Day Afternoon portrayed Wojtowicz to be "more rational than he really was".

I thought basically that the most important thing to capture was the human conflict, the human cry, the human need. And to tap that. To try to find that somehow and convey it in this bizarre situation was what we were trying to do.
— Al Pacino

Much of the cast consisted of actors Pacino performed with in off-Broadway plays. Pacino asked Lumet to cast John Cazale as Sal Naturile, the only name that did not change for the film. Pacino had worked with Cazale on Israel Horovitz's play The Indian Wants the Bronx, and then in the 1972 film The Godfather. Lumet was not initially convinced he should cast Cazale. He was thirty-nine years old, while Naturile was eighteen years old at the time of his death, but the director agreed after meeting him. Penelope Allen starred as Sylvia "Mouth" (based on Shirley "Mouth" Ball), and had worked with Pacino before on Scarecrow. For the role of Wortzik's mother, Pacino asked Lumet to cast Judith Malina, co-founder of The Living Theatre. Lumet wanted to portray the difference between a street police officer and one with an office job. Charles Durning and James Broderick were cast as Moretti and Sheldon respectively, though Lumet initially decided on Durning being the bank manager and Broderick playing Moretti until Pacino intervened. Because Durning was also working on Robert Wise's Two People, Lumet and Wise had to coordinate his schedule, as he flew between California and New York. Lumet did not worry about Broderick's recasting because of his reputation for method acting. Sully Boyar was cast as bank manager Mulvaney (based on Robert Barrett). Chris Sarandon convinced Lumet and Pacino during his reading and was cast as Leon Shermer. Lumet asked him to shift the focus of his characterization to "a little less Blanche DuBois, a little more Queens housewife".

There were three weeks of rehearsals, and the name of the project was changed to Dog Day Afternoon. Pierson flew from Los Angeles to New York at Lumet's request. Pacino refused to kiss Sarandon in a scene as he thought it was "exploitative"; he felt that the script kept "pushing the gay issue" on the audience. He expressed the view that viewers already knew the characters were homosexual and wanted to convey the failure of the relationship instead. Pierson agreed; he realized the couple did not actually kiss and that they had actually carried on a phone conversation. Pierson modified the scene to include the call. The National Gay Task Force approved of the script. Ronald Gold, then director of the organization, welcomed it as "sensitive and tasteful".

=== Filming ===
==== Opening scene ====
Filming took place between September and November 1974. The opening montage shows New York's traffic, bridges, beaches, and neighborhoods before moving to a view of the Manhattan skyline from a cemetery. Lumet wanted to convey "a hot boring day, a dog day afternoon". The director shot the footage from a station wagon, and ended in front of the bank, showing the robbers. The footage was silent, as Lumet decided that he did not want a score for the film. The director felt that "he could not reconcile trying to convince an audience that this really happened ... with putting a music score into it". Editor Dede Allen played Elton John's composition "Amoreena" in the editing room. Lumet added the song to the film, which comes out of the getaway car's radio.

==== The bank ====
Most of the film took place inside of the bank. Lumet discarded the idea of building a studio set; instead, the director found a street with a warehouse on the lower floor of a building that used to be an automotive workshop. The crew built a bank set with movable walls, which allowed Lumet to place the cameras as he desired, and to use long lenses to shoot from a distance. The warehouse's location also allowed Lumet to transition freely between the bank and the street, and he avoided changing film locations, and allowed the street to be visible from the inside of the bank. The scenes were shot on Prospect Park West, between 17th and 18th streets. The bus line that ran through the street was re-routed for filming, and the second story of the building housed the production offices and catering.

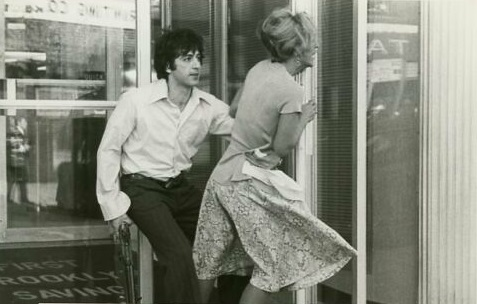
Pacino and Allen, re-entering the bank in a scene

To capture Pacino's movements in a natural fashion, and to allow the actor greater mobility, Lumet integrated the use of roller skates and wheelchairs for the cameramen in the panoramic shots. Lumet would order the camera operators to be pulled as Pacino acted to make the scene look "naturalistic", and "like it was shot by television cameramen, fighting their way through the crowd". He wanted the production to have the appearance of a newsreel. The film featured close-ups centered on Sonny and the situation in the bank.

Two different cameras were used to cover the negotiations from Durning and Pacino's side. Lumet and cinematographer Victor J. Kemper relied on long shots to depict the point of view of the police, and the robbers' "entrapment". Lumet wanted to use the light available on the set to avoid additional luminescence. He fitted the bank with extra fluorescent lamps to achieve desired exposure, and he used other fluorescent lamps of lower power as fill light in close-ups. The film required seven nights of filming. Lumet needed the neighbors' cooperation for the use of their fire escapes to hold additional lights. The production was challenged by the weather, as temperatures dropped. On the day of the heist in August 1972, the temperature reached 87 °F (31 °C) when the robbers entered the bank. The film was shot during the fall; to avoid having their breath be visible, the cast placed ice in their mouths to even out the temperature. Lighting was provided for the scenes by emergency vehicles, that were specially fitted with four 7,500 watt lamps. The white brick façade of the building provided light reflection. An existing lamp post was used, and its lighting reinforced to keep the crowd visible. Emergency lights were used on set in scenes where the power was shut off by the police.

Pacino shot the first scene wearing sunglasses, but he asked the director to re-shoot it after watching the dailies, as he felt that Sonny "wanted to get caught". He also shaved off a moustache he grew for the role after the replay. Lumet allowed the cast to ad-lib lines with the condition that they did not deviate greatly from the script by Pierson. The production team had recorded improvisations during the rehearsals that were added to the script. Lumet wanted the dialog to "feel natural", and he encouraged the actors to wear their own clothes and to not use makeup.

A crowd of three to four hundred extras was hired. Meanwhile, Lumet asked the neighbors to appear in the film by watching from their windows. The director offered to relocate to a hotel those who did not want to be disturbed by the shooting. The crowd grew as filming progressed, and pedestrians joined the actors. Students from Bishop Ford Central Catholic High School across the Prospect Expressway cut classes to watch the filming. Lumet directed the crowd and "whipp[ed] them up to a frenzy". By the second week, he felt that the crowd could improvise on its own. To amplify the effect in the film, he utilized hand-held cameras. In regards to the project while it was filming, Lumet said "It's out of my hands. It's got a life of its own". In a scene on the street, before Pacino left the bank, assistant director Burtt Harris whispered to him to ask the crowd about Attica. Pacino then improvised the complete dialog with the crowd.

==== Phone conversations ====
Lumet decided to shoot the phone conversations Sonny had with his wife and Leon back-to-back. As Pacino acted the scene, he increased the intensity of the portrayal. While both conversations lasted a total of fourteen minutes, Lumet's camera could only shoot ten at a time, and he had to bring a second camera. For the scene, Lumet separated Pacino from the rest of the bank with a black velvet mask to isolate him. He left a hole for both cameras, and for himself to look in. Lumet wanted a second take. An exhausted Pacino accepted, and he kept the same intensity. At the end of the scene, Lumet and Pacino cried. The director later remembered it as "an amazing moment, as good a moment of directing as I've ever had in my life".

The call between Pacino and Sarandon was improvised. Lumet felt that Sarandon "had great taste", and that the actor would not resort to "homosexual clichés". He deemed the humor of his improvisation as "genuinely funny", and that it was not "laughing at a gay character". Sarandon felt that the conversation was welcomed by the audiences because it "wasn't about a drag queen and his boyfriend", and that it reflected two people that were "trying to come to grips with what is wrong in their relationship." The film was characterized by its "light comic touch", and according to critic David Thomson, for its "ear and instinct for comedy". In Pierson's script, Wortzik's question regarding which country Sal wanted to escape to did not have a scripted response, but Cazale improvised by answering "Wyoming". Lumet had to cover his mouth, as he nearly interrupted the scene by laughing.

==== Final scene ====
The start of the final scene at the bank was shot on a 40 °F (4 °C) night with wind. Pacino was sprinkled with water to simulate sweat; Lumet mixed the artificial sweat himself, as he felt that the makeup crews often used it in excess, or that it was insufficient. The director used a mixture of glycerin and water that he learned to make during the shooting of 12 Angry Men. The mixture lasted longer and allowed him better continuity throughout the scenes.

Harris directed the scene of the caravan that headed to Kennedy Airport from a helicopter. A plane and squad cars on the tarmac were used. Senator Jacob Javits, an acquaintance of Lumet, facilitated the negotiations with the Port Authority of New York and New Jersey. The production team was given one day to shoot in an area of the airport that was not a terminal. The international flights that headed to the main runway had to go around the shooting location. Lumet directed the scene at the airport from the ground. He chose to cut from the close-up after Sal was shot and a gun was held to Sonny's head, to a long shot; the view presented a panorama of the scene at the airport. Lumet centered on Pacino and ordered the crew to roll Cazale on a stretcher to be visible by the actor. Pacino used the image to improvise his reaction.

[The wedding footage] was so extreme visually, that I thought, if we ever see that, we are not gonna be able to take the rest of the movie seriously. We're not gonna be able to take his reading of the will [...] seriously, we are never going to be able to take this character seriously. Because it gets so campy. And people get defensive about that sort of thing. [...] and that was the only real piece of footage I saw of that day.
— Sidney Lumet.

The shooting was completed three weeks ahead of schedule. After editing the film, Lumet and Allen felt that the slow-paced scene of Sonny dictating his will/testament conflicted with the rest of the fast-moving sequences, so they decided to restore six to seven minutes of discarded footage to balance the tempo of the film. Lumet stated the scene of the last will was the reason for his decision to work on the film; he considered it "moving", but worried about the audience laughing at it. His worries were based on what he considered "the defensive attitude on sexual subjects"; to avoid it, he focused on portraying emotional performances by the actors throughout the film. Lumet had access to the footage of Wojtowicz and Eden's ceremony, originally broadcast by Channel 5 at the time of the robbery, which featured Wojtowicz in his army uniform presenting a wedding ring with a flash cube to Eden, who wore a wedding dress. Wojtowicz's mother and eight male bridesmaids were present. Lumet planned to use it in the film; the scene would have featured the footage broadcast on a television in the bank, but he decided not to include it, as he felt it would be "unrecoverable" and that the audiences would not "take the rest of the movie seriously".

== Release and reception ==
Dog Day Afternoon opened on September 20, 1975, at the San Sebastián International Film Festival. The film premiered in New York City on September 21, 1975, and released nationwide in October. It grossed between $50 million (equivalent to $299.17 million in 2025) and $56 million (equivalent to $335.06 million in 2025).

The New York Times delivered a favorable review. It called the film a "gaudy street-carnival", and Lumet's "most accurate, most flamboyant" depiction of New York. The reviewer remarked the "brilliant characterizations" of the cast: Pacino's display of a "bravura style", Sarandon's performance of "fear, dignity and silliness" and the acting "that one remembers" from the supporting cast. New York Daily News gave Dog Day Afternoon four stars: it described the film as a "gut-level human comedy" and called Pacino "stunning", "brilliantly erratic and terribly touching". The publication felt that Pacino portrayed "a rich, volatile character". It favored Durning and Sarandon, and called the female cast "marvelous". The Record welcomed the performances as "very natural". It determined that "all the slickness" was on Pierson's script, and it attributed it to its closeness to the real events portrayed on the film. For The Village Voice, critic Andrew Sarris opined that Pacino acted "assiduously with the whites of his eyes". Sarris also noted that "pain [came] pouring out of Pacino's eyes" as he deemed Sonny a "Freudian tragic hero", and that the combination with Cazale's character's "deadpan death wish" produced "much emotional debris". The piece declared the "high point" of the film to be the phone conversation between Pacino and Sarandon. Sarris pointed that the dialogue featured "two wounded creatures capable of an extraordinary emotional audacity", and concluded that the film was to be "seen, but not swallowed whole" and "making heroes out of felons" was "a short step to utter chaos". Film critic Roger Ebert rated it with three-and-a-half stars out of four, welcoming its "irreverent, quirky sense of humor". Gary Arnold of The Washington Post called it "a triumphant new classic of American movie naturalism". Penelope Gilliatt of The New Yorker wrote, "Though the farcical tone of the movie is blusterous, falling into the common show-biz habit of supplying energy in place of intent, the movie succeeds, on the whole, because it has the crucial farcical value of not faltering."

Gene Siskel gave Dog Day Afternoon four stars on his review for the Chicago Tribune, and rated the film as "superb", noting the "scenes mixing the fear of violence with insane laughter". He felt that Pacino, Cazale, and Durning kept the film from "degenerating into silliness". Siskel talked about Pacino's display of "so much energy" that made him "believe the unbelievable" and Cazale's "haunting, sallow-cheeked silence". Lumet and Allen were praised for the "terrific, roller-coaster" pace of the film. United Press International defined it as an "exceptionally fine film—outrageously funny and deeply moving", and welcomed Pacino's acting as a "dazzing display". The supporting roles by Cazale, Durning, Allen and Broderick were deemed "excellent", while Peretz and Sarandon's performances were singled out. For Joe Baltake, Pacino's appearance was a "raw, high voltage, uproariously funny performance". His review on the Philadelphia Daily News continued by calling the film "super-charged", and "multi-leveled" by "a slapstick comedy, tense drama, caper tale, biographical material and character study". Baltake compared Cazale's appearance on the film to that of a Coonskin character by Ralph Bakshi. In regards to the rest of the cast, he determined "everyone [was] good". He praised Kemper's cinematography as "you-are-there" and Allen's "razor-sharp editing".

The Boston Globe praised Lumet's "wonderful" direction of "in-depth, psychological probing". Critic Kevin Kelly hailed the editing by Allen as "brilliant", and defined Pacino's performance as "virtuose" and Cazale's as "shyly and sorrowfully eloquent". The review also favored the "fine performances" by the supporting cast. The Evening Sun applauded the humor in the movie. Critic Lou Cedrone felt that it was "natural and true"; he stressed that Pierson's script, combined with the work of Pacino and Lumet, made the drama "never uncomfortable". The Detroit Free Press expressed that the picture relied on Pacino's "tender, forthright, generous and affecting in extreme" performance.

The Miami Herald praised Dog Day Afternoon as "a movie of fascinating realism". Critic John Huddy expressed that the street scenes were "magnificently staged", and that Lumet "finds order in chaos, sense in insanity". The Atlanta Constitution applauded Durning as "absolutely real", and the reviewer opined that the cast was "consistently fine". It concluded by mentioning "the excellent script and editing", and defined the film as "funny and poignant".

The Montreal Gazette mentioned the variety of characters presented in the film. The reviewer concluded that it was "a monument to the thought and care" by the production team. Pacino's "remarkable performance", and Pierson's "all-inclusive" script were noted. The Guardian opined that Dog Day Afternoon presented Lumet's "best film for some considerable time", and deemed Pacino's acting as "brilliant" and Cazale's as "well-observed". The Sydney Morning Herald considered it "beautifully directed" by Lumet, and "another mature American picture which faces and mirrors reality".

=== Lawsuits ===
Wojtowicz's wife, Carmen, received $50 (equivalent to $400 in 2025) from Artists Entertainment Complex for her contribution to the story. She signed the documents to Wicker, who recorded in exchange a tape with her account on behalf of the company. The depiction of her character, Angie, in the film affected her, as she felt she was deemed "repulsive". The novelization of Dog Day Afternoon described her as "a fat cunt", "no-good pusbag" and a "guinea broad", among other pejorative terms. In the film, Angie laments her weight gain as the reason for Sonny's distance. Wojtowicz was also angered by her depiction in the film, and defined his then-wife as "a sweet kid". Pierson declared that the character was presented "farthest from the truth", and that he could not "stand how [Lumet] cast the role," or how Peretz portrayed her. He further stressed his disappointment at the publicity campaign that presented the film as a "true story", and remarked its differences with the Life article. Pierson presented a complaint to the Writers Guild of America. Kluge, a coauthor of the Life feature, believed the film-makers "stayed with the surface of a lively journalistic story" and that the film had a "strong, fast-paced story" without "reflection" or "a contemplative view of life".

Carmen took legal action against Warner Bros. On behalf of her, and her daughters Carmen and Dawn, Wojtowicz filed a lawsuit alleging invasion of privacy and requesting $12,000,000 in damages. The appellate division of the New York Supreme Court ruled in favor of Warner Bros, as the court determined that the true names or pictures of the family and robbers were not used in the film or the book. Wojtowicz then sued the studio for 1% of the earnings he claimed were included in the deal for the use of his story; he received $40,000 (equivalent to $212,500 in 2025) after lawyer's fees were deducted. The New York Supreme Court ordered that $100 (equivalent to $400 in 2025) were to be given weekly to Carmen Wojtowicz, plus $50 weekly for both children. The rest of the money was placed in escrow of the New York State Crime Victims Compensation Board to pay for the claims of the victims of the 1972 robbery.

=== Accolades ===
Dog Day Afternoon was nominated for six Academy Awards. Pierson received the Academy Award for Best Original Screenplay. The film was nominated for seven Golden Globes but won none. It received six British Academy Film Awards nominations: Pacino was nominated for Best Actor in a Leading Role and Allen won the Best Editing. Pierson also received the Writers Guild of America Award for Best Written Drama, and Durning the National Board of Review Award for Best Supporting Actor. At the San Sebastián International Film Festival Pacino won Best Actor, while the movie was nominated for Best Film.

The film ranked at number seventy on AFI's 100 Years... 100 Thrills list. Meanwhile, the line "Attica! Attica!" placed at number eighty-six on 100 Years...100 Movie Quotes. It was nominated for 100 Years...100 Movies in 1998 and 2007. In 2006, Premiere issued its "100 Greatest Performances of All Time". The magazine placed Pacino's performance as Sonny as the fourth-greatest ever. In the same year, Writers Guild of America West ranked its screenplay 69th in WGA's list of 101 Greatest Screenplays. In 2012, the Motion Picture Editors Guild listed Dog Day Afternoon as the twentieth best edited film of all time based on a survey of its membership.

Award	Category	Nominee(s)	Result	Ref.
Academy Awards	Best Picture	Martin Bregman and Martin Elfand	Nominated	
Academy Awards	Best Director	Sidney Lumet	Nominated	
Academy Awards	Best Actor	Al Pacino	Nominated	
Academy Awards	Best Supporting Actor	Chris Sarandon	Nominated	
Academy Awards	Best Original Screenplay	Frank Pierson	Won	
Academy Awards	Best Film Editing	Dede Allen	Nominated	
British Academy Film Awards	Best Film	Sidney Lumet	Nominated	
British Academy Film Awards	Best Direction	Sidney Lumet	Nominated	
British Academy Film Awards	Best Actor in a Leading Role	Al Pacino (also for The Godfather Part II)	Won	
British Academy Film Awards	Best Screenplay	Frank Pierson	Nominated	
British Academy Film Awards	Best Editing	Dede Allen	Won	
British Academy Film Awards	Best Sound	Jack Fitzstephens, Richard Cirincione, Sandy Packow, Stephen A. Rotter, James Sabat and Dick Vorisek	Nominated	
David di Donatello Awards	David Special Award	Martin Bregman and Martin Elfand	Won	
Directors Guild of America Awards	Outstanding Directorial Achievement in Motion Pictures	Sidney Lumet	Nominated	
Golden Globe Awards	Best Motion Picture – Drama		Nominated	
Golden Globe Awards	Best Actor in a Motion Picture – Drama	Al Pacino	Nominated	
Golden Globe Awards	Best Supporting Actor – Motion Picture	John Cazale	Nominated	
Golden Globe Awards	Best Supporting Actor – Motion Picture	Charles Durning	Nominated	
Golden Globe Awards	Best Director – Motion Picture	Sidney Lumet	Nominated	
Golden Globe Awards	Best Screenplay – Motion Picture	Frank Pierson	Nominated	
Golden Globe Awards	New Star of the Year – Actor	Chris Sarandon	Nominated	
Kansas City Film Critics Circle Awards	Best Actor	Al Pacino	Won	
Los Angeles Film Critics Association Awards	Best Film		Won (Note: Tied with One Flew Over the Cuckoo's Nest.)	
Los Angeles Film Critics Association Awards	Best Director	Sidney Lumet	Won	
Los Angeles Film Critics Association Awards	Best Actor	Al Pacino	Won	
National Board of Review Awards	Top Ten Films		5th Place	
National Board of Review Awards	Best Supporting Actor	Charles Durning	Won	
National Film Preservation Board	National Film Registry		Inducted	
New York Film Critics Circle Awards	Best Actor	Al Pacino	Runner-up	
New York Film Critics Circle Awards	Best Supporting Actor	Chris Sarandon	Nominated	
Online Film & Television Association Awards	Hall of Fame – Motion Picture		Won	
San Sebastián International Film Festival	Golden Shell		Nominated	
San Sebastián International Film Festival	Best Actor	Al Pacino	Won	
Writers Guild of America Awards	Best Drama Written Directly for the Screen	Frank Pierson	Won	

== Legacy ==
Analysis in the 21st century of Dog Day Afternoon has interpreted it as an "anti-authoritarian film" that "defied the establishment," particularly with the emphasis on the Attica Prison riot and the character's resentment toward the police. Commentators also mentioned its contemporaneity with the aftermath of the Vietnam War and the Watergate scandal. It became one of the first motion pictures to portray a bisexual male character as the protagonist. In 2009, Dog Day Afternoon was deemed "culturally, historically, or aesthetically significant" by the Library of Congress, and it was selected for preservation in the National Film Registry.

On November 11, 1979, a censored and shortened version was broadcast on NBC's Sunday Night Big Event, which marked the film's television premiere. It was released on VHS in 1985. In 2006, Warner Home Video released Dog Day Afternoon on a double-disc DVD. For the film's fortieth anniversary, a two-disc blu-ray was released in 2015. Metacritic, which uses a weighted average, assigned the film a score of 86 out of 100, based on 15 critics, indicating "universal acclaim". Meanwhile, On the review aggregator website Rotten Tomatoes, 94% of 125 critics' reviews are positive, with an average rating of 8.6/10. The website's consensus reads: "Dog Day Afternoon offers a finely detailed snapshot of people in crisis with tension-soaked drama shaded in black humor."

AllMovie gave the movie five stars out of five. The review defined it as "a quintessential 1970s story", and focused on the film's "contemporary tensions over law, media, and sexuality". Christopher Null wrote in 2006 that the film "captures perfectly the zeitgeist of the early 1970s, a time when optimism was scraping rock bottom and John Wojtowicz was as good a hero as we could come up with". During the 2011 San Francisco International Film Festival, the film was included as a tribute to Pierson for his recent death. The San Francisco Chronicle reflected on the time of its release, and the reviewer felt that "it seemed as if the great movies would never stop, when the extraordinary creative burst we'd been seeing in the 1970s looked as though it might go on forever". The A.V. Club called it a "frank social melodrama that's also a celebration of quotidian bravery", while it praised the cinematography by Kemper that "captures the joy as well as the decay of a crowded city". IGN delivered a good review, and considered Pacino's performance to be "spectacular, and achieves a kind of nuance and complexity that few actors from his or any other generation have before or since achieved". Meanwhile, the reviewer considered that the movie displayed the reason Cazale was "one of the great character actors of all time".

=== In popular culture ===
The 1977 Italian film Operazione Kappa: sparate a vista was loosely based on Dog Day Afternoon. The 1987 Hong Kong film People's Hero was a remake of the film. For his audition on The Simpsons, actor Hank Azaria used an imitation voice based on Pacino's Dog Day Afternoon character. It was the basis for the final voice of Moe Szyslak. A bank robbery featuring Sonny and Sal was featured on The Simpsons' episode "I Don't Wanna Know Why the Caged Bird Sings". In 2006, Marcia Jean Kurtz and Lionel Pina reprised their Dog Day Afternoon roles as Miriam Douglas and a pizza delivery man in the heist thriller film Inside Man.

The names of several television series episodes referenced the film, including All in the Family, Welcome Back, Kotter, Alice, St. Elsewhere, Sledge Hammer!, Hill Street Blues, Perfect Strangers, The New Adventures of Winnie the Pooh, The New Lassie, Kenan & Kel, King of the Hill, Bob's Burgers, Supernatural, and 2 Broke Girls. The shout "Attica! Attica!" was also reproduced in multiple films and television series.

=== Stage adaptation ===
A stage adaptation of the movie is set to premiere on Broadway in the spring of 2026 written by Stephen Adly Guirgis. Rupert Goold is set to direct with Jon Bernthal and Ebon Moss-Bachrach starring as Sonny and Sal, respectively. In October 2025, it was announced the show would premiere on March 10, 2026 at the August Wilson Theatre and run through June 28.

== See also ==
- List of American films of 1975
- The Dog, a 2013 documentary on John Wojtowicz
- Heist film
