= The Anonymous Venetian (film) =

1970 film

- Theatrical release poster
- Directed by: Enrico Maria Salerno
- Written by: Enrico Maria Salerno; Giuseppe Berto
- Produced by: Pio Angeletti; Adriano De Micheli
- Starring: Florinda Bolkan; Tony Musante
- Cinematography: Marcello Gatti
- Edited by: Mario Morra
- Music by: Stelvio Cipriani
- Production company: Turi Vasile
- Distributed by: Warner Bros.
- Release date: 30 September 1970
- Running time: 91 minutes
- Country: Italy
- Language: Italian

Anonimo Veneziano (English: The Anonymous Venetian) is a 1970 Italian drama film written and directed by the famous Italian actor Enrico Maria Salerno in his debut as a film director. It starred American actor Tony Musante and Brazilian actress Florinda Bolkan.

The film is especially notable for its romantic musical score, composed by Stelvio Cipriani. In the movie's musical score there is also an Adagio, erroneously attributed to the Baroque Venetian composer Benedetto Marcello (31 July or 1 August 1686 – 24 July 1739). In reality, the author of the Concerto for Oboe and Strings in D minor was his older brother Alessandro (1 February 1673 – 19 June 1747). In 1970, Frida Boccara recorded the song "Venise Va Mourir", the main theme of the film (French version, lyrics by Eddy Marnay), later performing it at the Cannes Film Festival. Tony Renis recorded it as "Anonimo veneziano" (English and Italian versions, 1970) and "Venise Va Mourir" (1971, French version). Singers Sergio Denis (1971), Fred Bongusto (1971), Ornella Vanoni (1971), and Nana Mouskouri (as "To Be the One You Love", 1973), also performed the piece.

== Plot ==
A Venetian musician is affected by an incurable disease. He arranges to meet his wife, who is now living with another man in another city, but does not tell her about his condition. They walk through the streets and channels of Venice. They remember the happy times when they lived together, she is in blissful ignorance of his terminal illness. He has to play a classic concert piece, recently discovered, but with no known composer, the 'Anonymous Venetian', in a recording studio. She finally realizes that she is still in love with him.

== Awards ==
- David di Donatello: Best Actress (Florinda Bolkan), Special David to Enrico Maria Salerno.
- Nastro d'Argento: Best Cinematography in Color (Marcello Gatti), Best Score (Stelvio Cipriani).
