= Marina Cicogna =

Italian film producer and photographer (1934–2023)

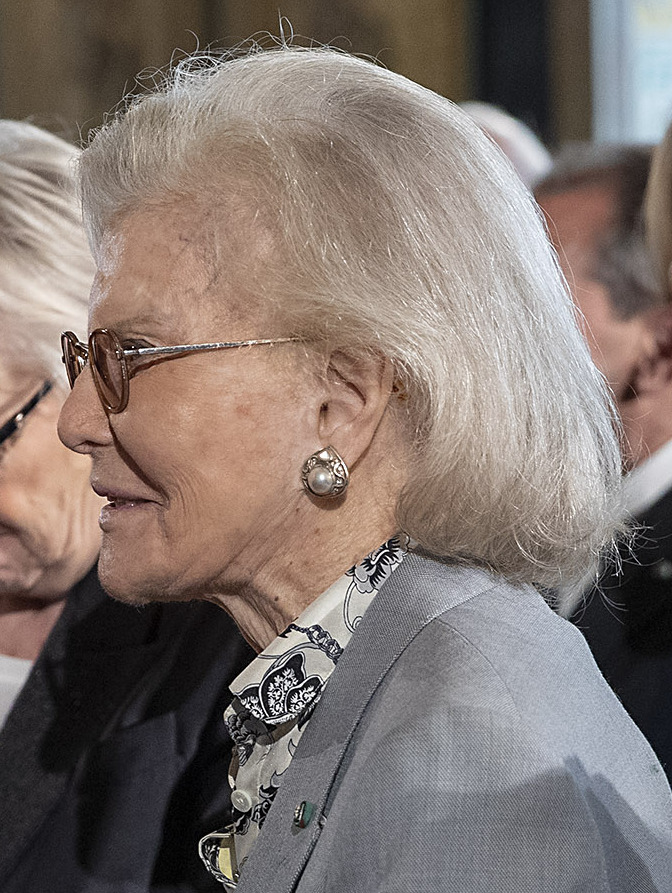
- Cicogna in 2023
- Born: Marina Cicogna Mozzoni Volpi di Misurata; 29 May 1934; Rome, Italy
- Died: 4 November 2023 (aged 89); Rome, Italy
- Occupations: Producer, photographer

Contessa Marina Cicogna Mozzoni Volpi di Misurata (29 May 1934 – 4 November 2023) was an Italian film producer and photographer. She produced the film Belle de Jour, which won the Golden Lion at the Venice Film Festival in 1967.

== Early life and education ==
Marina Cicogna was born in 1934 in Rome, and grew up in Milan, Venice, and Cortina. She was the daughter of Countess Annamaria Volpi di Misurata and Count Cesare Cicogna Mozzoni, a banker. Her mother owned Euro International Films, which she later handed control over to Marina and her brother Bino Cicogna. Cicogna's maternal grandfather was Giuseppe Volpi, an influential figure in Italy's history; one of the country's richest men, he held many government posts through his Fascist party connections and was Italy’s minister of finance in Mussolini's government. He founded the Venice Film Festival.

Cicogna attended Sarah Lawrence College in Yonkers, New York, staying less than a year. While there, she befriended Barbara Warner, daughter of film executive Jack L. Warner; this connection facilitated Cicogna's introduction to other actors in Hollywood. She studied photography at another school in the United States, and took pictures of Hollywood friends, including Marilyn Monroe and Greta Garbo. The black and white photographs were later published in a book.

== Career ==
=== Film ===
At the age of 32, Cicogna decided to pursue a career in the film industry. Her mother bought a share in a film distribution company, and Cicogna suggested films for the business to purchase. She distributed the West German film Helga, which she described as the first time a birth was shown on screen. She publicized it by placing "ambulances at the exit of the film, saying that people would faint when they saw that".

The New York Times describes her as "the first major female Italian film producer" and "one of the most powerful women in European cinema". One of her films, Belle de Jour, won the Golden Lion at the 1967 Venice Film Festival.

Cicogna also had three films at the 1967 Venice Film Festival, including Luis Buñuel’s “Belle de Jour,” starring Catherine Deneuve as a Paris housewife who secretly works at a bordello, which won the festival’s highest prize, the Golden Lion. That year she threw what came to be known as a legendary festival party. “I didn’t give a big ball, but rather said that everyone could dress as they wanted, as long as they were in white and yellow or white and gold”. The event included sending Learjets to Corsica and Rome to fly in Elizabeth Taylor and Richard Burton and Jane Fonda and Roger Vadim respectively.

She also produced such films as Once Upon a Time in the West, Investigation of a Citizen Above Suspicion (winner of the Academy Award for Best Foreign Language Film), and Brother Sun, Sister Moon.

=== Photography ===
Her interest in photography led to the publication of two books, one of them displaying images of her family's 18th-century home in Tripoli.

=== Other roles and activities ===
Until her death, she was a vice-president on the board of the Ischia Global Film & Music Festival, an international film festival held on the Italian island of Ischia.

== Personal life and death ==
For 20 years her life partner was the actress Florinda Bolkan. After they split, she began a relationship with Benedetta Gardona, which lasted until Cicogna's death. Cicogna legally adopted Gardona for inheritance purposes. Same-sex unions were not legally recognized at the national level in Italy until 2016.

Cicogna died from cancer in Rome, on 4 November 2023, at the age of 89.
