= Marco Tullio Giordana =

Italian director and screenwriter (born 1950)

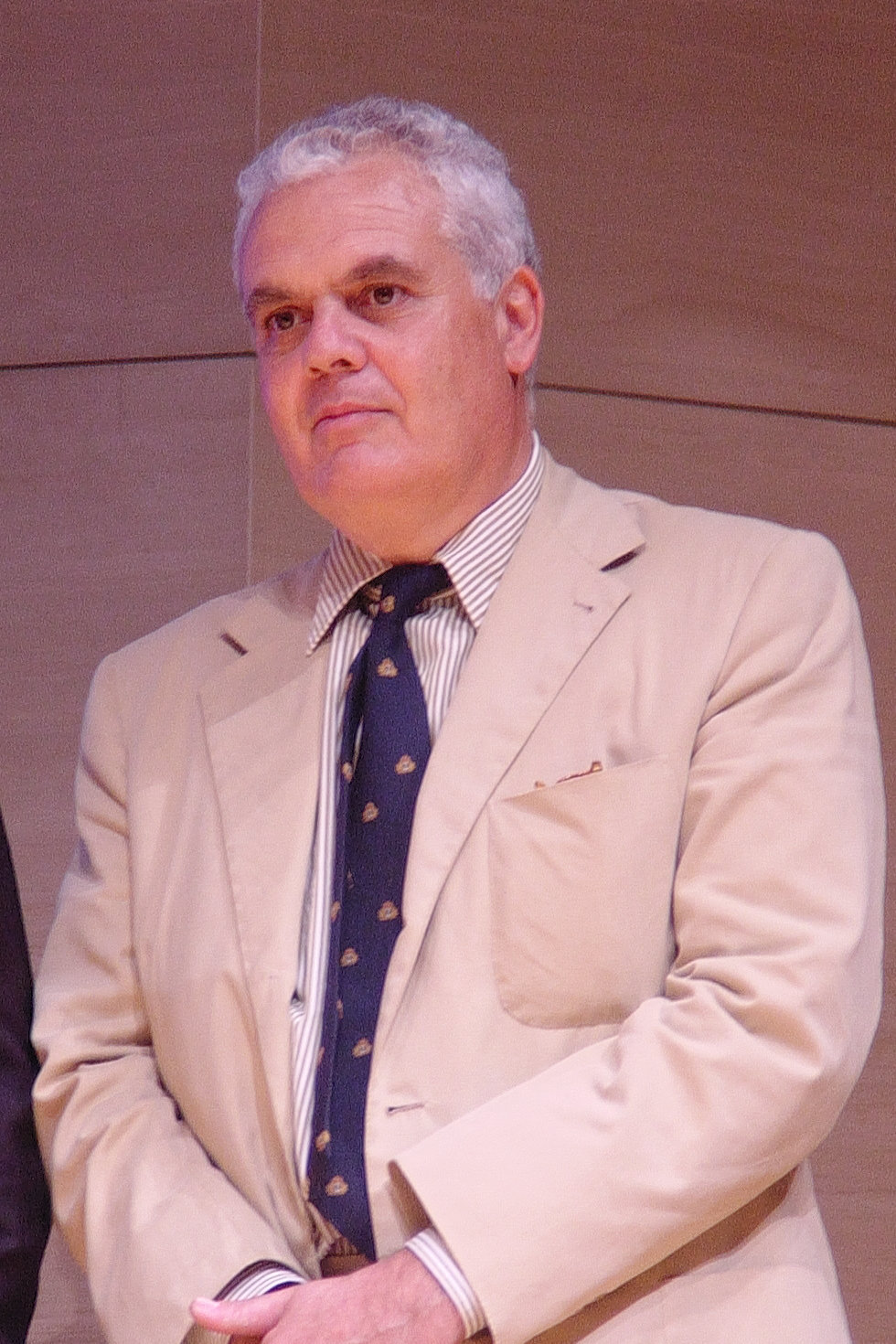
- Marco Tullio Giordana in 2006.
- Born: 1 October 1950 (age 75); Milan, Italy
- Occupation(s): Director, screenwriter
- Years active: 1977–present

Marco Tullio Giordana (born 1 October 1950) is an Italian film director and screenwriter.

== Biography ==
Born in Milan, during the 1970s he approached the cinema by collaborating on the screenplay of Roberto Faenza's 1977 documentary Forza Italia!, while his debut behind the camera comes two years later, in 1979 with the feature film To Love the Damned, presented at the 1979 Cannes Film Festival and winner of the Golden Leopard at the Locarno Film Festival. In 1981, he made an ambitious project, The Fall of the Rebel Angels, presented at the 38th Venice International Film Festival.

In 1996 he participated with other directors, Gianni Amelio, Marco Risi, Alessandro D'Alatri and Mario Martone in the RAI and UNICEF project Beyond childhood – Five directors for UNICEF. In 2000 he returned to the Venice Film Festival with One Hundred Steps, a film of denunciation on the life and death of Peppino Impastato, which won the prize for best screenplay. In 2003 he made the film The Best of Youth, which traces Italian history from the 1960s to early 2000s and which wins the Un Certain Regard section of the 2003 Cannes Film Festival.

In 2005 he presented himself in competition at Cannes with Once You're Born You Can No Longer Hide.

In 2012 he made the film Piazza Fontana: The Italian Conspiracy, dedicated to the Piazza Fontana massacre of 12 December 1969 and the events that followed, up to the assassination of Commissioner Luigi Calabresi on 17 May 1972.

After the success of "Piazza Fontana: The Italian Conspiracy," Marco Tullio Giordana continued to make significant contributions to Italian cinema. In 2018, he directed A Woman's Name, a film that tackles the issue of sexual harassment in the workplace. This film further cemented his reputation as a filmmaker deeply engaged with contemporary social issues. A Woman's Name follows the story of a woman who stands up against the harassment she faces in her workplace, highlighting the systemic issues and personal courage involved in such struggles.

== Filmography ==
=== Director ===
- To Love the Damned (1980)
- The Fall of the Rebel Angels (1981)
- Notti e nebbie (1984) – Film TV
- Appointment in Liverpool (1988)
- Especially on Sunday (1991) – segment La neve sul fuoco
- L'unico paese al mondo (1994)
- Who Killed Pasolini? (1995)
- Scarpette bianche (1996) – Film TV
- One Hundred Steps (2000)
- Un altro mondo è possibile (2001)
- The Best of Youth (2003)
- Once You're Born You Can No Longer Hide (2005)
- Wild Blood (2008)
- Piazza Fontana: The Italian Conspiracy (2012)
- A Woman's Name (2018)
- Yara (2021)
- The Life Apart (2024)

=== Screenwriter ===
- Forza Italia! (1978)
- Car Crash (1980)
- To Love the Damned (1980)
- The Fall of the Rebel Angels (1981)
- Notti e nebbie (1984) – Film TV
- Appointment in Liverpool (1988)
- Who Killed Pasolini? (1995)
- Scarpette bianche (1996) – Film TV
- One Hundred Steps (2000)
- Once You're Born You Can No Longer Hide (2005)
