= Elizabeth Eden =

American transgender woman (1946–1987)

- Elizabeth Debbie Eden
- Born: Ernest Aron; August 19, 1946; New York City, U.S.
- Died: September 29, 1987 (aged 41); Rochester, New York, U.S.

Elizabeth Debbie Eden (born August 19, 1946 – September 29, 1987) was an American transgender woman whose husband, John Wojtowicz, attempted a bank robbery, allegedly to pay for her gender-affirming surgery.

The incident was adapted into the crime drama film Dog Day Afternoon (1975), directed by Sidney Lumet. The character Leon Shermer, played by Chris Sarandon, is loosely based on Eden.

== Biography ==
=== Early life ===
Eden was born on August 19, 1946, in Ozone Park, Queens. She was Jewish.

=== Relationship with Wojtowicz ===
In 1971, she and John Wojtowicz met at the Feast of San Gennaro in New York City. The two, Elizabeth in a bridal gown and John in military attire, wed in a public ceremony that year. The wedding received widespread attention in local media, even being featured on a segment of Walter Cronkite's news show, CBS Evening News.

Following a series of suicide attempts, which Wojtowicz attributed to Eden's despondency over her inability to afford gender-reassignment surgery, Eden was admitted to a psychiatric institution.

The following year, on August 22, 1972, Wojtowicz attempted to rob a Chase Manhattan bank branch in Gravesend, Brooklyn. He claimed that he attempted the robbery in order to obtain funds so that Eden could have surgery. However, the claim was disputed by some, with Arthur Bell, a respected Village Voice columnist and investigative journalist who knew Wojtowicz, stating that the robbery was due to Wojtowicz's debts to the Gambino Mafia. Wojtowicz had also previously expressed opposition to Eden's desire to undergo surgery. Eden was not aware of the plan. Wojtowicz was sentenced to 20 years, but was released in 1978. Wojtowicz did two more stretches in prison for parole violations in 1984 and 1986-1987. He said he was released in April 1987, and Eden visited him in New York about once a month.

The 1975 film Dog Day Afternoon shows Sonny (the Wojtowicz character) making out a will to give Leon (Eden's character) his life insurance so that even if he were killed, Leon could pay for the operation. The real-life Wojtowicz was paid $7500 for the rights to his story, from which he gave Eden enough money to pay for the surgery. The character based on Eden was portrayed by Chris Sarandon who was nominated for an Academy Award for Best Supporting Actor for his role.

=== Later life ===
Following her gender-affirming surgery, Eden legally married someone else, then divorced.

Eden died of AIDS-related pneumonia on September 29, 1987, aged 41, at Genesee Hospital in Rochester, New York.

== Legacy ==
Her personal papers and photographs were donated posthumously to the National Archive of Lesbian, Gay, Bisexual & Transgender History at the Lesbian, Gay, Bisexual & Transgender Community Center in New York, on June 14, 1990.

After her death, she was adapted as a character in the Drunk History episode "Love," telling the story of her romance with Wojtowicz and the robbery that followed it. She was portrayed by trans actress Trace Lysette.
