= Uruburetama =

Municipality in Ceará, Brazil

Municipality of Uruburetama Uruburetamian Arraial
- Municipality of Uruburetama
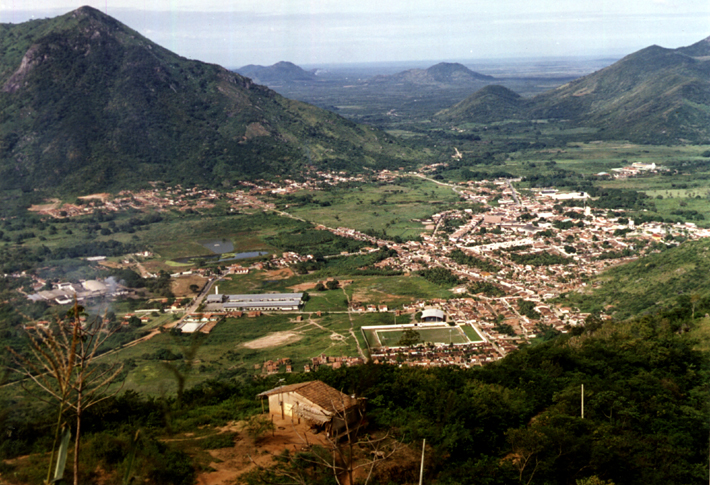

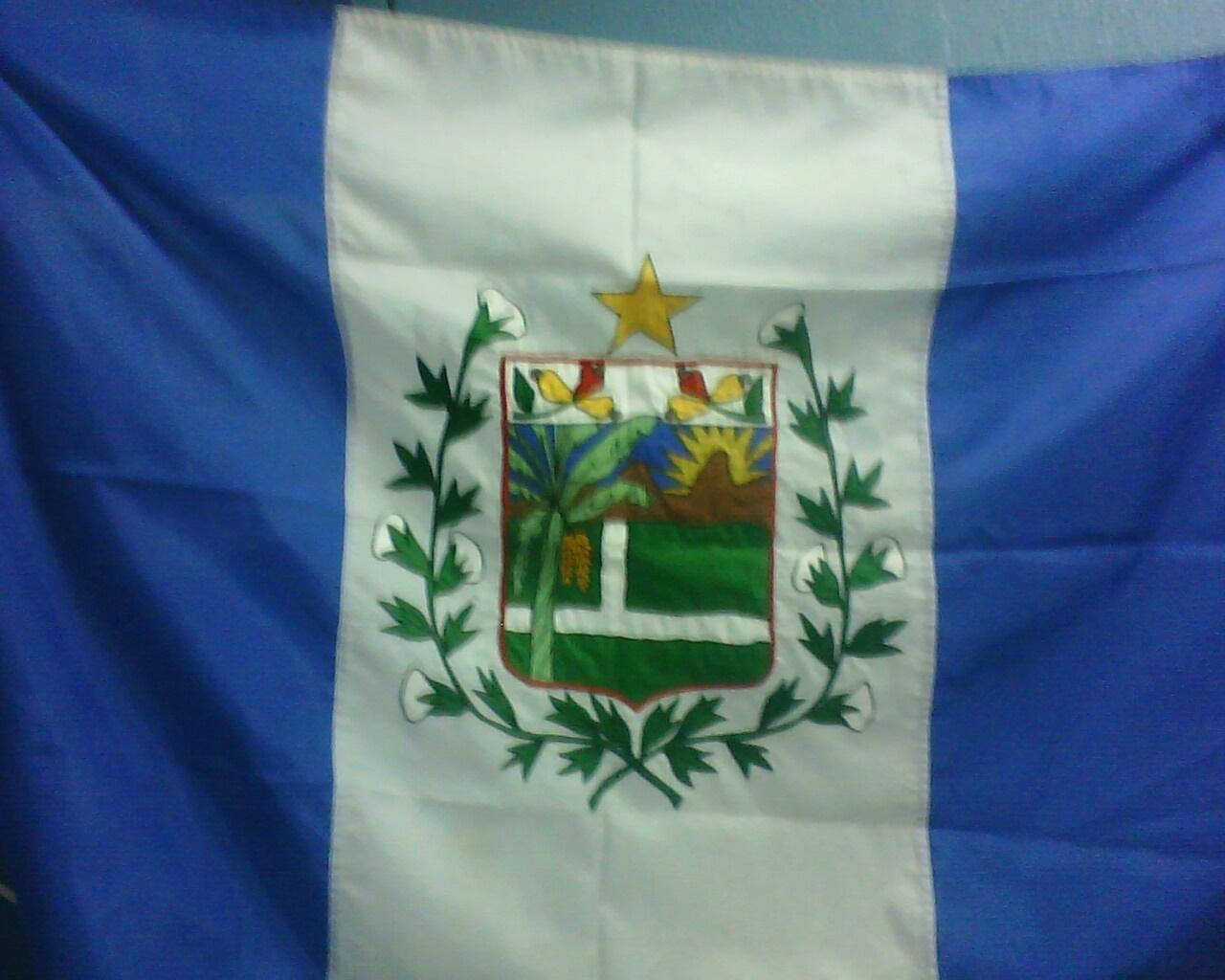
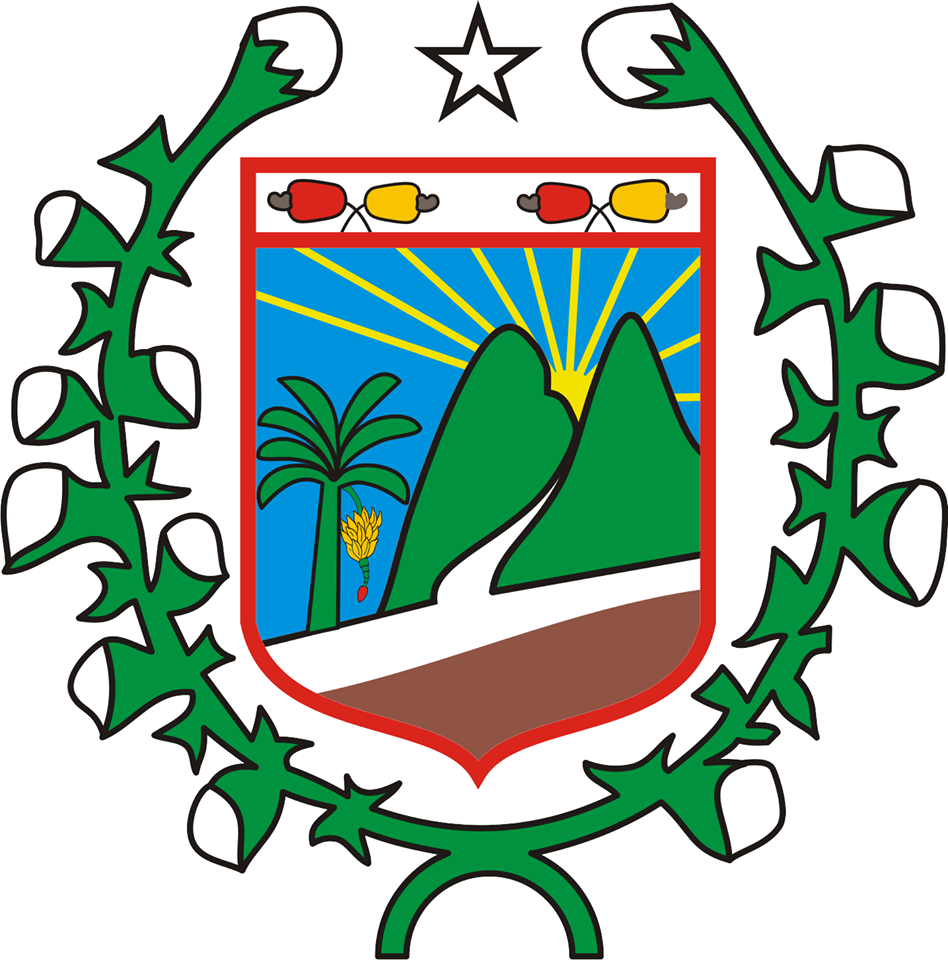
- Flag Coat of arms
- Nickname: Arraial
- Motto: "Um Novo Tempo Chegou" ("A New Time Has Come")

- Location in Brazil
- Country: Brazil
- Region: Nordeste
- State: Ceará
- Mesoregion: Noroeste Cearense IBGE/2008

Government
  - Prefeito (Mayor): Francisco Aldir Chaves da Silva

Population (2020)
  - Total: 22,040
- Time zone: UTC−3 (BRT)
- CEP: 62650-000
- Area code: 5585
- Website: http://www.uruburetama.ce.gov.br/

Uruburetama is a municipality in the state of Ceará in the Northeast region of Brazil. Its population, according to the census of the Brazilian Institute of Geography and Statistics, IBGE, 2010, is 19,765 people.

== Toponymy ==
"Uruburetama" is a word derived from the Tupi-Guaraní language which means "land of the vultures," by combining the terms uru'bu (crow, vulture, buzzard) and retama (land).

== History ==
The municipality is located in the former 'sesmaria' (colonial land allotment) granted to the Captain General Bento Coelho de Morais on November 19, 1720.

These lands were donated to the Father Estevão Velho Cabral de Melo for priestly heritage by Manuel Pereira Pinto, a lieutenant colonel, who received the inheritance of the Captain General Bento Coelho de Morais, his father in law.

In 1761 came the first time, the toponym "Sítio Arraial" (Ranch Hamlet), in a document that Father Estevão reverted the land to its donors, reserving for himself only a quarter of a league.

In 1878, the Fathers João Francisco Dias Nogueira and José Tomaz Albuquerque concluded the current main church thanks to donations from the people.

On 1 August 1890, Decree 34 the settlement was elevated to town with the toponym of St. John of Arraial. But the following year, by court term, the council was dissolved and attached to the municipalities of San Francisco (now Itapajé) and Itapipoca.

On July 28, 1899, through Law 526, the village was restored with the name of St. John Uruburetama.

The village was elevated to city status under the name of Arraial in 1931, under the State Decree 262 of 28 July 1931. However, the name was replaced by Uruburetama in 1938. At the time, the council was made up of districts: Uruburetama (headquarters), Curu (now São Luís do Curu), Natavidade (Cemoaba), Riachuelo (now Umirim) and Tururu, all independent today.

Currently the municipality consists of the districts Uruburetama, Santa Luzia, Itacolomy, Retiro, Severino, Canto Escuro, Bananal and Tamboatá.

== Geographical ==
It is located in the coastal region of the state, with a distance of about 111 km, in line straight from the state capital Fortaleza.

=== Cities surrounding Uruburetama ===
The diagram below show the cities 40 km near Uruburetama.

Cities surrounding Uruburetama

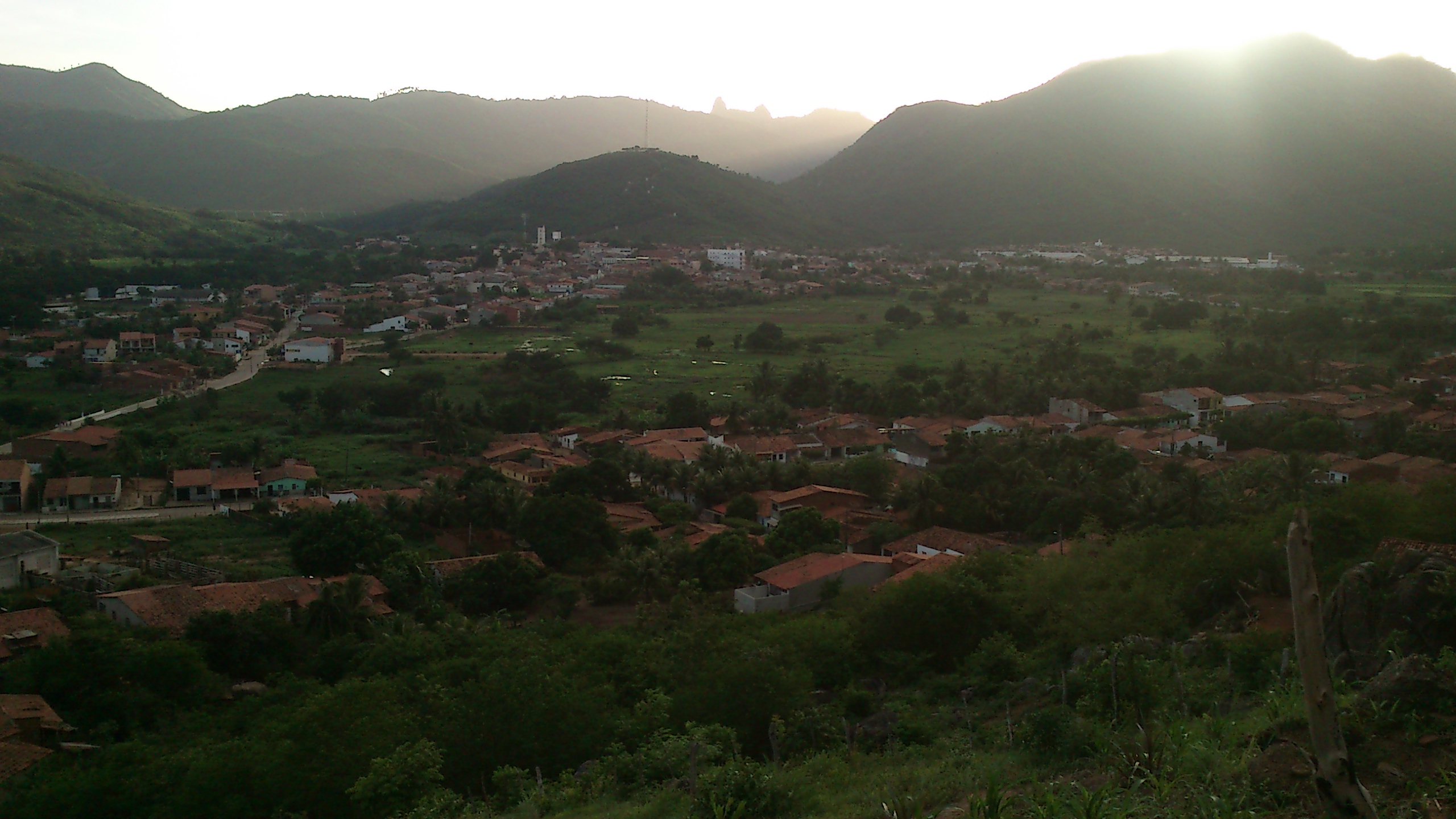
Uruburetama View from Serra do Pau Alto. 2013.

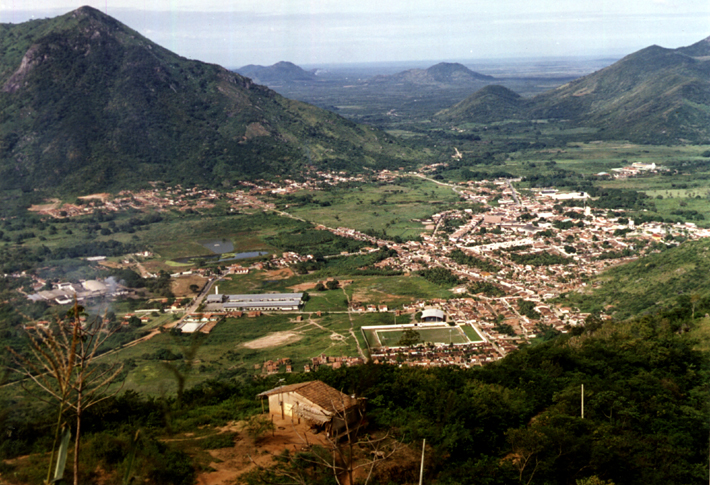

== See also ==
- List of municipalities in Ceará
