= A Brief Vacation =

1973 film by Vittorio De Sica

- Italian theatrical release poster
- Italian: Una breve vacanza
- Directed by: Vittorio De Sica
- Screenplay by: Cesare Zavattini
- Story by: Rodolfo Sonego
- Produced by: Arthur Cohn
- Starring: Florinda Bolkan; Renato Salvatori; Daniel Quenaud; José María Prada; Adriana Asti
- Cinematography: Ennio Guarnieri
- Edited by: Franco Arcalli
- Music by: Manuel De Sica
- Production companies: Verona Produzione; Azor Films
- Distributed by: Cinema International Corporation
- Release dates: 21 July 1973 (Taormina); 7 September 1973 (Italy); 2 June 1975 (Spain)
- Running time: 106 minutes
- Countries: Italy; Spain
- Language: Italian

A Brief Vacation (Italian: Una breve vacanza) is a 1973 melodrama film directed by Vittorio De Sica. The screenplay was written by Cesare Zavattini, was inspired by an Apollinaire adage ("Sickness is the vacation of the poor"). The film addresses issues such as the health care system, labor conditions, spousal satisfaction, and class struggle.

== Plot ==
A female factory worker from Calabria falls ill on the job and is prescribed a stay at a mountain retreat. She goes despite her husband's wishes, leaving behind her thankless work shift and her frustrating in-laws, but also her three children.

== Cast ==
- Florinda Bolkan as Clara Mataro
- Renato Salvatori as Franco Mataro, the husband
- Daniel Quenaud as Luigi, Clara's lover
- José María Prada as Dr. Ciranni
- Teresa Gimpera as Gina
- Hugo Blanco as brother-in-law
- Julia Peña as Edvige
- Miranda Campa as Nurse Guidotti
- Angela Cardile as the redhead
- Anna Carena as mother-in-law
- Monica Guerritore as Maria
- Maria Mizar as Nurse Garin
- Alessandro Romanazzi as son
- Adriana Asti as Scanziani
- Christian De Sica as Mariani

== Production ==
Principal cinematography started in Milan on November 1972.

== Critical reception ==
The New York Times said in its review, "The director's personal warmth is unwavering throughout, and the film makes an honorable ending to his career."

The film was nominated for Best Foreign Language Film by the U.S. National Board of Review.

Florinda Bolkan won the inaugural Best Actress prize from the Los Angeles Film Critics Association for her performance.
