= Footprints on the Moon =

Footprints on the Moon may refer to:

- For the event of putting footprints on the moon, see Apollo 11#Lunar surface operations.
- Footprints on the Moon (1975 film), Italian title Le orme, a 1975 film directed by Luigi Bazzoni and Mario Fanelli
- Footprints on the Moon (1969 film) full title Footprints on the Moon: Apollo 11, a 1969 documentary film directed by Bill Gibson
- A 2009 book by Mark Haddon
- A 2001 book by Alexandra Siy
- A 1996 book by Jill Eggleton
- Footprints on the Moon and Other Poems about Space, a children's book by Brian Moses
- A 1988 book by Maureen Hunter
- A children's classroom musical by Jan Holdstock
- A fictional band in The Big Bang Theory, formed by Howard Wolowitz and Raj Koothrappali
- A song by Gabby Barrett
- A 2017 comedy album by Chad Daniels
