= Luca De Dominicis =

Italian actor

Luca De Dominicis (July 5, 1973 – September 3, 2024) was an Italian actor. He is best known for his walk-on role as King Herod in Mel Gibson's The Passion of the Christ and in Cabras and Molinari's The Big Question. De Dominicis died on September 3, 2024, at the age of 51.

== Filmography ==
| Year | Title | Role | Notes |
|---|---|---|---|
| 2004 | The Passion of the Christ | Herod Antipas | |
| 2004 | The Big Question | | |
