= Camillo Bazzoni =

Italian cinematographer (1934–2020)

Camillo Bazzoni (29 December 1934 – 8 October 2020) was an Italian cinematographer and film director.

== Career ==
Born in Salsomaggiore Terme, Bazzoni started as camera operator in 1960. From 1967 he worked as cinematographer with, among others, Lina Wertmüller, Mario Monicelli, Salvatore Samperi, Massimo Troisi, and Franco Rossi. He was also a second unit camera operator on Warren Beatty's Reds.

After a series of documentaries and short films, in 1968 Bazzoni debuted as a film director with Macaroni Combat, Suicide Commandos, and a Spaghetti Western, A Long Ride from Hell.

He was the younger brother of the director Luigi Bazzoni and the brother-in-law of Academy Award winner Vittorio Storaro.

== Selected filmography ==
=== As director ===
- Suicide Commandos (1968)
- A Long Ride from Hell (1968)
- Mafia Connection (1970)
- Shadows Unseen (1972)

=== As screenwriter ===
- Mafia Connection (1970)
- The Last Desperate Hours (1974)

=== As cinematographer ===
- The Adolescents (La Fleur de l'âge, ou Les adolescentes) - 1964
- Man, Pride and Vengeance (1967)
- Ernesto (1979)
- Love in First Class (1980)
- Via degli specchi (1982)
- A Joke of Destiny (1983)
- Bertoldo, Bertoldino e Cacasenno (1984)
- The Two Lives of Mattia Pascal (1985)
- The Moro Affair (1986)
- La Bonne (1986)
- Let's Hope It's a Girl (1986)
- Summer Night (1986)
- Cavalli si nasce (1988)
- Pensavo fosse amore, invece era un calesse (1991)
- Penniless Hearts (1996)
- Rosa and Cornelia (2000)
