= The Possessed (1965 film) =

1965 Italian film

- Italian film poster
- Directed by: Luigi Bazzoni; Franco Rossellini
- Screenplay by: Giulio Questi; Luigi Bazzoni; Franco Rosselini; Ernesto Gastaldi
- Based on: La donna del lago 1962 novel by Giovanni Comisso
- Produced by: Manolo Bolognini
- Starring: Peter Baldwin; Salvo Randone; Valentina Cortese; Pia Lindström; Philippe Leroy; Virna Lisi
- Cinematography: Leonida Barboni
- Edited by: Nino Baragli
- Music by: Renzo Rossellini
- Production companies: B.R.C. Produzione Film; Istituto L.U.C.E.
- Distributed by: Telexport
- Release dates: July 24, 1965 (Locarno Festival); August 14, 1965 (Italy)
- Running time: 90 minutes
- Country: Italy
- Language: Italian
- Box office: £100.116 million

The Possessed (Italian: La donna del lago, lit. 'The Lady of the Lake') is a 1965 Italian mystery film written and directed by Luigi Bazzoni and Franco Rossellini and starring Peter Baldwin, Virna Lisi, Pia Lindström and Philippe Leroy. It is based on the novel La donna del lago by Giovanni Comisso. The film was years later released on U.S. television as Love, Hate and Dishonor.

== Plot ==
Bernard (Peter Baldwin), a well-known writer, arrives in a small Italian town near a lake to spend his winter vacation. He checks into an old hotel owned by Enrico and his daughter Irma (Valentina Cortese), secretly hoping to become reacquainted with their maid Tilde (he had developed quite a crush on her the last time he stayed there, and had even stalked her a few times). He is shocked to hear that Tilde (Virna Lisi) committed suicide the previous winter, and then learns that she was pregnant. Apparently she not only ingested poison, but she also managed to slash her own throat.

Bernard refuses to believe that Tilde committed suicide and decides to discover what really happened to her. When Enrico's son Mario (Philippe Leroy) and his wife Adriana (Pia Lindstrom) arrive at the hotel, the two begin acting suspiciously, silently walking around the lake at night. Enrico isn't too happy about Bernard snooping around the hotel either. Bernard becomes obsessed with learning what happened to Tilde and begins to experience daydreams, flashbacks, and hallucinations.

== Cast ==
- Peter Baldwin as Bernard
- Salvo Randone as Mr. Enrico
- Valentina Cortese as Irma
- Pia Lindström as Adriana
- Philippe Leroy as Mario
- Virna Lisi as Tilde
- Ennio Balbo as Coroner
- Pier Giovanni Anchisi as Francesco
- Anna Maria Gherardi as Servant
- Mauro Laurentino as Doctor
- Vittorio Duse as Police Officer

== Production ==
The Possessed was based on the 1962 novel La donna del lago by Giovanni Comisso. Giulio Questi was hired to write the screenplay. Along with directors Luigi Bazzoni and Franco Rosselini, a fourth uncredited writer was added to work on the film: Ernesto Gastaldi. For their contributions to the script, Gastaldi, Bazzoni, and Rosselini received 700,000, 500,000 and 250,000 Italian lire respectively. Questi received the highest pay, earning 3 million lire.

== Release ==
The Possessed premiered at the Swiss Locarno Festival on 24 July 1965. It was released in Italy on 14 August 1965, where it was distributed by Telexport, a minor distribution company that only released the film in a limited area in Italy. The film grossed 100,116,000 Italian lire domestically. The Possessed's poor commercial performance prompted producer Manolo Bolognini to approach Sergio Corbucci to make a Spaghetti Western that would recoup its costs; this would become Django.

In the United States, the film was released straight to television by AIP-TV in 1972 under the title Love, Hate and Dishonor; unlike most of the company's catalogue, which were offered in packages for broadcast syndication, the film was presented as a standalone "special feature".

The Possessed was released by Arrow Video on Blu-ray Disc on April 2, 2019 in the United Kingdom. This release utilizes a 2K restoration of the film with Italian and English audio options as well as several special features, including an audio commentary by Tim Lucas and an appreciation of the film by Richard Dyer.
