= The Mystery of Dante =

- film poster
- Directed by: Louis Nero
- Written by: Louis Nero
- Produced by: Franco Nero; Louis Nero
- Starring: F. Murray Abraham; Taylor Hackford; Franco Zeffirelli; Christopher Vogler; Valerio Manfredi
- Cinematography: Louis Nero
- Edited by: Louis Nero
- Music by: Steven Mercurio; Ryland Angel
- Production company: L'Altrofilm
- Distributed by: L'Altrofilm
- Release date: February 14, 2014
- Running time: 100 minutes
- Country: Italy
- Language: Italian

The Mystery of Dante (Italian: Il mistero di Dante) is a 2014 Italian independent film written and directed by Louis Nero that explores The Divine Comedy though a documentary-style look at the life and philosophy of Dante Alighieri.

== Production ==
The film was shot in the basement of the Macello castle and in Turin. It includes cultural references from Shakespeare, the Sufis (all of Ibn Arabi), and including Luigi Valli, Gabriele Rossetti, René Guénon, Miguel Asín Palacios, and also religious origins of literature, from Muslim, Jewish and Indian traditions back to the Epic of Gilgamesh. Inspired by the work of Gustave Doré, the animations express the esoteric world with respect.

== Plot ==
The film investigates the life and philosophy of Dante Alighieri through a series of interviews with intellectuals, artists, masons and men of faith who guide the viewer in discovering a little-known side of the man considered the father of the Italian language. This includes analysis of the cardinal points of The Divine Comedy and references to the Western tradition of initiation, secret lodges, membership or not, which accompany the viewer in a different approach to the study of Dante Alighieri. The film's first ten minutes are presented in a found footage format, before segueing into a series of interviews interspersed with occasional animations.

== Cast ==
- F. Murray Abraham as Dante Alter Ego
  Interviewees
- Taylor Hackford
- Franco Zeffirelli
- Christopher Vogler
- Valerio Manfredi
- Roberto Giacobbo
- Riccardo Di Segni
- Massimo Introvigne
- Giancarlo Guerreri
- Marcello Vicchio
- Aurora Distefano
- Silvano Agosti
- Diana Dell'Erba
- Mamadou Dioumé
- Gabriele La Porta
- Abd al Wahid Pallavicini
- S.E. Agostino Marchetto

== Reception ==
La Stampa called the film an ambitious project, and a meeting with the potential heirs of the Fedeli d'Amore.

Sentieri Selvaggi wrote that the film is full of both symbolism and pathos, offering an over-the-top popularization that is an overly emotional prophetic mission which carries an amazing truth. It said that the best way to describe Louis Nero's efforts would be as ambitious, with the flavor of maturity. It noted the inclusion of references to the works of scholars, including Valerio Massimo Manfredi, Gabriele La Porta, Silvano Agosti, Robert Jacob and Franco Zeffirelli, transferred into a series of interviews accompanied by certain fictions, in a sort of mockumentary in which the principals are summoned by the secret community "The Brothers of Love", whose representatives have decided to release a witness. The film is accompanied by music composed by Steven Mercurio and Ryland Angel.
