= The Broken Key =

- Directed by: Louis Nero
- Written by: Louis Nero
- Produced by: Louis Nero
- Starring: Andrea Cocco; Diana Dell'Erba; Christopher Lambert; Rutger Hauer
- Cinematography: Louis Nero
- Edited by: Louis Nero
- Music by: Lamberto Curtoni
- Production company: L'Altrofilm
- Distributed by: L'Altrofilm
- Release date: November 16, 2017 (Italy)
- Running time: 120 minutes
- Country: Italy
- Language: English
- Budget: 1.8 $

The Broken Key is a 2017 English-language Italian independent film written and directed by Louis Nero.

== Cast ==
- Andrea Cocco as Arthur J. Adams
- Diana Dell'Erba as Sara Eve
- Marco Deambrogio as James Mind
- Christopher Lambert as Francis Rosebud
- Rutger Hauer as Professor Adrian Moonlight
- Geraldine Chaplin as Tower Woman
- Michael Madsen as Tully De Marco
- William Baldwin as Friar Hugo
- Kabir Bedi as Fahrid Al-Kamar
- Maria De Medeiros as Althea
- Franco Nero as Hiram Abif
- Marc Fiorini as Nicholas Macchiavelli
- Walter Lippa as Taron Iron
- Alex Belli as "Snake"
- Chiara Iezzi as Esther Star
- Ariadna Romero as Nora Segni
- Diego Casale as Frank Maro

== Production ==
The film was shot in Italy, Cairo and York. In Piedmont was shot in locations including: Sacra di San Michele, Saliceto, Piedmont, Rosazza, Caves of Bossea.
