= The Rage (2008 film) =

- Film poster
- Italian: La Rabbia
- Directed by: Louis Nero
- Written by: Louis Nero
- Produced by: Louis Nero
- Starring: Franco Nero; Faye Dunaway; Tinto Brass; Philippe Leroy; Giorgio Albertazzi; Lou Castel; Corin Redgrave; Arnoldo Foà; Jun Ichikawa; Corso Salani
- Cinematography: Louis Nero
- Edited by: Louis Nero
- Music by: Teho Teardo
- Release date: 2008
- Running time: 104 minutes
- Country: Italy
- Language: Italian

The Rage (Italian: La Rabbia) is a 2008 Italian film directed by Louis Nero.

== Plot ==
A young director lives with a girl. Active part of the Intellectual society, he represents perfectly the union between fear and determination, that changes deeply his way of understanding the world that surrounds him. His only aim is to leave a footstep of his presence on this world realizing a film.

== Cast ==
- Franco Nero as Mentore
- Nico Rogner as Il regista
- Giorgio Albertazzi as Produttore commerciale
- Tinto Brass as Primo produttore
- Lou Castel as Spazzino
- Arnoldo Foà as Attore
- Antonella Salvucci as Segretaria del primo produttore
- Philippe Leroy as Nonno
- Corso Salani as Primo sceneggiatore
- Faye Dunaway as Madre
- Corin Redgrave as Producer 1
