= Mafia Connection =

- Directed by: Camillo Bazzoni
- Written by: Franco Barbaresi; Nicola Manzari; Yvette Louis; Camillo Bazzoni; Giovanni Addessi
- Story by: Carlo Infascelli
- Produced by: Giovanni Addessi
- Starring: Antonio Sabàto
- Cinematography: Sandro Mancori
- Music by: Carlo Rustichelli
- Release date: 1970
- Language: Italian

Mafia Connection (Italian: E venne il giorno dei limoni neri, also known as Black Lemons) is a 1970 Italian crime film written and directed by Camillo Bazzoni and starring Antonio Sabàto, Peter Carsten and Florinda Bolkan.

== Cast ==
- Antonio Sabàto as Rosario Inzulia
- Peter Carsten as Orlando Lo Presti
- Silvano Tranquilli as Commissioner Modica
- Pier Paolo Capponi as Francesco Macaluso
- Don Backy as Carmelo Rizzo
- Florinda Bolkan as Rossana
- Didi Perego as Concettina
- Lee Burton as Michele
- Raf Sparanero as Antonio
- Maria Luisa Sala as Assunta
- Frank Latimore as The American
- Stefano Satta Flores as Hitman
- Massimo Farinelli as Giancarlo Lo Presti
- Loris Bazzocchi as Pasquale Sciortino

== Reception ==
Film critic Roberto Curti referred to the film as "more the work of an accomplished cinematographer than that of a director, lacking inner thematic coherence but showing a stylistic flair which puts it above other genre efforts of the period".
