= Raul: Straight to Kill =

- Directed by: Andrea Bolognini
- Written by: Luigi Bazzoni; Suso Cecchi D'Amico; Masolino D'Amico
- Cinematography: Daniele Nannuzzi
- Edited by: Alessandro Lucidi
- Music by: Andrea Morricone
- Production company: Ilena Cinematografica S.r.l.
- Distributed by: Warner Bros. Pictures
- Release date: 15 April 2005
- Country: Italy
- Language: Italian

Raul: Straight to Kill (Italian: Raul - Diritto di uccidere) is a 2005 Italian crime-drama film directed by Andrea Bolognini. It was awarded best film at the 2005 BAFF film festival. The score by Andrea Morricone was nominated for best music at the Italian Golden Globes.

== Cast ==
- Stefano Dionisi: Raul
- Violante Placido: Sonia
- Nicola Farron: Mario
- Giancarlo Giannini: Judge Porfirio
- Alessandro Haber: Matteo Mariotti
- Ernesto Mahieux: Patruno
- Maurizio Mattioli: Caretti
- Guia Jelo: Caterina
- Laura Betti: Usurer
- Laura Troschel: Maitresse

== See also ==
- List of Italian films of 2005
