= Vittorio Storaro =

Italian cinematographer (born 1940)

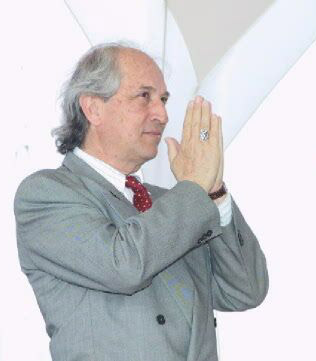
- Storaro at Cannes in 2001
- Born: 24 June 1940 (age 86); Rome, Italy
- Education: Centro Sperimentale di Cinematografia
- Years active: 1960–2023
- Organization(s): American Society of Cinematographers; Associazione Italiana Autori della Fotografia Cinematografica

Vittorio Storaro, A.S.C., A.I.C. (born 24 June 1940), is an Italian cinematographer, widely recognized as one of the best and most influential in cinema history.

Over the course of 50 years, he has collaborated with directors like Bernardo Bertolucci, Francis Ford Coppola, Warren Beatty, Woody Allen, and Carlos Saura.

Storaro is one of three living people to have won the Academy Award for Best Cinematography three times, a position he shares with Robert Richardson and Emmanuel Lubezki.

== Early life and education ==
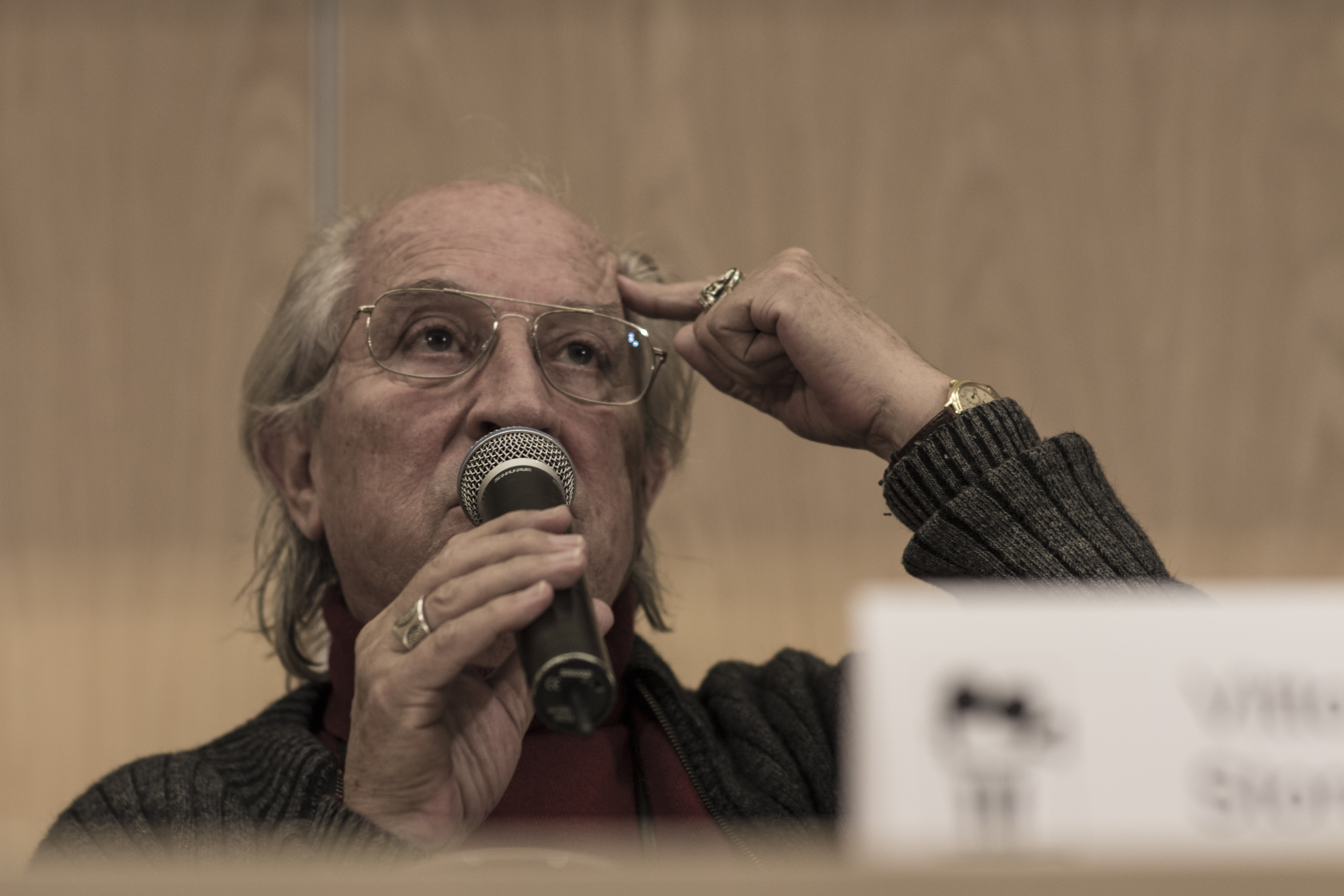
Storaro in Camerimage Festival 23 in 2015, talking about how color affects people physically and psychologically

Born in Rome, Storaro is the son of a film projectionist.

He began studying photography at the age of 11, and at the age of 18, he went on to formal cinematography studies at the national Italian film school, Centro Sperimentale di Cinematografia.

== Career ==
Storaro's philosophy is largely inspired by Johann Wolfgang von Goethe's theory of colors, which focuses in part on the psychological effects that different colors have and the way in which colors influence our perceptions of different situations.

He first worked with Bernardo Bertolucci on The Conformist (1970). He then worked on Dario Argento's first directorial feature The Bird with the Crystal Plumage (1970), which is considered a landmark in the giallo genre.

With Francis Ford Coppola, Storaro made his American film debut with Apocalypse Now (1979), which earned him his first Academy Award for Best Cinematography.

Storaro went to win two more Academy Awards in the 1980s, one with Warren Beatty's Reds (1981) and one for Bertolucci's The Last Emperor (1987).

In 2002, Storaro completed the first in a series of books that articulate his philosophy of cinematography.

He was the cinematographer for a BBC co-production with Italian broadcaster RAI of Verdi's Rigoletto over two nights on the weekend of 4 and 5 September 2010.

Though working primarily with film cameras, Woody Allen's feature Café Society (2016) was Storaro's first project to be shot digitally.

In 2017, Storaro was honored with the George Eastman Award. The same year he also attended the New York Film Festival at which he debated with Edward Lachman on cinematography and its transition from film to digital.

With his son Fabrizio, he created the Univisium format system to unify all future theatrical and television movies into one respective aspect ratio of 2.00:1. As of 2023, this unification has not happened, and the universal replacement of 4:3 televisions by large, wide-screen displays greatly reduces the need to modify scope-ratio films for home theater presentation.

== Personal life ==
Storaro is known for stylish, fastidious, and flamboyant personal fashion. Francis Ford Coppola once noted, "Vittorio is the only man I ever knew that could fall off a ladder in a white suit, into the mud, and not get dirty."

== Filmography ==
=== Feature film ===
| Year | Title | Director | Notes |
|---|---|---|---|
| 1962 | Attack of the Normans | Giuseppe Vari | With Marco Scarpelli |
| 1969 | Youth March | Franco Rossi | |
| 1969 | Delitto al circolo del tennis | Franco Rossetti | |
| 1970 | The Bird with the Crystal Plumage | Dario Argento | |
| 1970 | The Conformist | Bernardo Bertolucci | |
| 1970 | The Spider's Stratagem | Bernardo Bertolucci | With Franco Di Giacomo |
| 1971 | The Fifth Cord | Luigi Bazzoni | |
| 1971 | 'Tis Pity She's a Whore | Giuseppe Patroni Griffi | |
| 1972 | Last Tango in Paris | Bernardo Bertolucci | |
| 1973 | Malicious | Salvatore Samperi | |
| 1973 | Brothers Blue | Luigi Bazzoni | |
| 1973 | Corpo d'amore | Fabio Carpi | |
| 1973 | Giordano Bruno | Giuliano Montaldo | |
| 1974 | The Driver's Seat | Giuseppe Patroni Griffi | |
| 1975 | Footprints on the Moon | Luigi Bazzoni; Mario Fanelli | |
| 1976 | 1900 | Bernardo Bertolucci | |
| 1976 | Submission | Salvatore Samperi | |
| 1979 | Agatha | Michael Apted | |
| 1979 | Apocalypse Now | Francis Ford Coppola | |
| 1979 | Luna | Bernardo Bertolucci | |
| 1981 | Reds | Warren Beatty | |
| 1982 | One from the Heart | Francis Ford Coppola | With Ronald Víctor García |
| 1985 | Ladyhawke | Richard Donner | |
| 1987 | Ishtar | Elaine May | |
| 1987 | The Last Emperor | Bernardo Bertolucci | |
| 1988 | Tucker: The Man and His Dream | Francis Ford Coppola | |
| 1990 | Dick Tracy | Warren Beatty | |
| 1990 | The Sheltering Sky | Bernardo Bertolucci | |
| 1992 | Tosca | Brian Large | |
| 1993 | Little Buddha | Bernardo Bertolucci | |
| 1996 | Taxi | Carlos Saura | |
| 1998 | Bulworth | Warren Beatty | |
| 1998 | Tango | Carlos Saura | |
| 1999 | Goya in Bordeaux | Carlos Saura | |
| 2000 | Mirka | Rachid Benhadj | |
| 2000 | Picking Up the Pieces | Alfonso Arau | |
| 2004 | Zapata: el sueño del héroe | Alfonso Arau | |
| 2004 | Exorcist: The Beginning | Renny Harlin | |
| 2005 | Dominion: Prequel to the Exorcist | Paul Schrader | |
| 2009 | I, Don Giovanni | Carlos Saura | |
| 2010 | The Trick in the Sheet | Alfonso Arau | |
| 2012 | Parfums d'Alger | Rachid Benhadj | |
| 2015 | Muhammad: The Messenger of God | Majid Majidi | |
| 2016 | Café Society | Woody Allen | |
| 2017 | Wonder Wheel | Woody Allen | |
| 2018 | A Rose in Winter | Joshua Sinclair | |
| 2019 | A Rainy Day in New York | Woody Allen | |
| 2020 | Rifkin's Festival | Woody Allen | |
| 2021 | The King of All the World | Carlos Saura | |
| 2023 | Coup de chance | Woody Allen | |

Documentary film

| Year | Title | Director |
|---|---|---|
| 1994 | Roma imago urbis | Luigi Bazzoni |
| 1995 | Flamenco | Carlos Saura |
| 2010 | Flamenco Flamenco | Carlos Saura |

=== Television ===
| Year | Title | Director |
|---|---|---|
| 1971 | Eneide | Franco Rossi |

Miniseries

| Year | Title | Director | Notes |
|---|---|---|---|
| 1974 | Orlando Furioso | Luca Ronconi | With Arturo Zavattini |
| 1983 | Wagner | Tony Palmer | |
| 1986 | Peter the Great | Marvin J. Chomsky; Lawrence Schiller | |
| 2000 | Frank Herbert's Dune | John Harrison | |
| 2007 | Caravaggio | Angelo Longoni | |

TV movies

| Year | Title | Director | Notes |
|---|---|---|---|
| 1992 | Tosca: In the Settings and at the Times of Tosca | Brian Large | |
| 1992 | Writing with Light: Vittorio Storaro | David M. Thompson | Documentary film |
| 2000 | La traviata | Pierre Cavassilas | |
| 2010 | Rigoletto a Mantova | Pierre Cavassilas | |

== Awards and nominations ==
Academy Awards

| Year | Category | Title | Result |
|---|---|---|---|
| 1980 | Best Cinematography | Apocalypse Now | Won |
| 1982 | Best Cinematography | Reds | Won |
| 1988 | Best Cinematography | The Last Emperor | Won |
| 1991 | Best Cinematography | Dick Tracy | Nominated |

British Academy Film Awards

| Year | Category | Title | Result | Ref. |
|---|---|---|---|---|
| 1980 | Best Cinematography | Apocalypse Now | Nominated | |
| 1983 | Best Cinematography | Reds | Nominated | |
| 1989 | Best Cinematography | The Last Emperor | Nominated | |
| 1991 | Best Cinematography | The Sheltering Sky | Won | |

American Society of Cinematographers

| Year | Category | Title | Result |
|---|---|---|---|
| 1988 | Outstanding Cinematography | The Last Emperor | Nominated |
| 1991 | Outstanding Cinematography | Dick Tracy | Nominated |
| 2001 | Outstanding Achievement in Cinematography in a Limited Series | Dune | Nominated |
| 2001 | Lifetime Achievement Award | | Won |

European Film Awards

| Year | Category | Title | Result | Ref. |
|---|---|---|---|---|
| 2000 | Best Cinematography | Goya en Burdeos | Won | |

Primetime Emmy Awards

| Year | Category | Title | Result |
|---|---|---|---|
| 1986 | Best Cinematography for a Miniseries or Special | Peter the Great | Nominated |
| 2001 | Best Cinematography for a Miniseries or Special | Frank Herbert's Dune | Won |

Cannes Film Festival

| Year | Category | Title | Result | Ref. |
|---|---|---|---|---|
| 1998 | Technical Grand Prize | Tango, no me dejes nunca | Won | |

International Film Festival of India

| Year | Category | Result | Ref. |
|---|---|---|---|
| 2020 | Lifetime Achievement Award | Won | |

British Society of Cinematographers

| Year | Category | Title | Result |
|---|---|---|---|
| 1979 | Best Cinematography | Apocalypse Now | Nominated |
| 1988 | Best Cinematography | The Last Emperor | Won |
| 1990 | Best Cinematography | Dick Tracy | Nominated |

National Society of Film Critics

| Year | Category | Title | Result |
|---|---|---|---|
| 1972 | Best Cinematography | The Conformist | Won |

New York Film Critics Circle Awards

| Year | Category | Title | Result |
|---|---|---|---|
| 1987 | Best Cinematography | The Sheltering Sky | Won |
| 1990 | Best Cinematography | The Last Emperor | Won |

Los Angeles Film Critics Association

| Year | Category | Title | Result |
|---|---|---|---|
| 1981 | Best Cinematography | Reds | Won |
| 1988 | Best Cinematography | The Last Emperor | Won |

George Eastman Award

| Year | Category | Result |
|---|---|---|
| 2017 | Lifetime Achievement Award | Won |

Goya Awards

| Year | Category | Title | Result |
|---|---|---|---|
| 1996 | Best Cinematography | Flamenco (de Carlos Saura) | Nominated |
| 1999 | Best Cinematography | Tango, no me dejes nunca | Nominated |
| 2000 | Best Cinematography | Goya en Burdeos | Won |
