= Rasputin (2011 film) =

- Film poster
- Directed by: Louis Nero
- Written by: Louis Nero
- Produced by: Louis Nero
- Starring: Francesco Cabras, Franco Nero
- Cinematography: Louis Nero
- Edited by: Louis Nero
- Music by: Teho Teardo
- Production company: L'Altrofilm
- Distributed by: L'Altrofilm
- Release date: 2011
- Running time: 85 minutes
- Country: Italy
- Language: Italian

Rasputin is a 2010 Italian film directed by Louis Nero.

== Cast ==
- Francesco Cabras as Grigorij Efimovič Rasputin
- Daniele Savoca as prince Feliks Feliksovič Jusupov
- Franco Nero as narrator
- Marco Sabatino as Dmitrij Pavlovič Romanov
- Valerio Portale as Suhotin
- Diana Dell'Erba as Aleksandra Fëdorovna Romanova
- Anna Cuculo as Marianna
- Ottaviano Blitch as Jakov Michajlovič Jurovskij
- Anara Bayanova as Khioniya Guseva
- Ola Cavagna as Olga Lothina
- Elena Presti as Matrena Rasputina
- Davide Ranieri as prince Andronikov
- Matilde Maggio as Fon Den
- Toni Pandolfo as Police Officer's
- Riccardo Cicogna as Andronikov butler's
- Ruggero Romano as Aleksej Nikolaevič Romanov
- Roberto Pitta as Officer Vlasiuk
