= The Fifth Cord =

1971 film by Luigi Bazzoni

- Italian film poster by Ermanno Iaia
- Italian: Giornata nera per l'ariete
- Directed by: Luigi Bazzoni
- Screenplay by: Mario di Nardo; Mario Fanelli; Luigi Bazzoni
- Based on: The Fifth Cord; 1965 novel by D.M. Devine
- Produced by: Manolo Bolognini
- Starring: Franco Nero; Silvia Monti; Rossella Falk; Edmund Purdom; Luciano Bartoli; Maurizio Bonuglia; Pamela Tiffin
- Cinematography: Vittorio Storaro
- Edited by: Eugenio Alabiso
- Music by: Ennio Morricone
- Production companies: B.R.C. Produzione Film; Dario
- Distributed by: Jumbo Cinematografica
- Release date: 17 August 1971
- Running time: 93 minutes
- Country: Italy
- Language: Italian

The Fifth Cord (Italian: Giornata nera per l'ariete, lit. 'Black Day for Aries', also released as Evil Fingers) is a 1971 Italian giallo film directed and co-written by Luigi Bazzoni, and starring Franco Nero, Silvia Monti, Pamela Tiffin, Wolfgang Preiss, Ira von Fürstenberg, Edmund Purdom and Rossella Falk. It is based on a 1965 novel by Scottish author D.M. Devine.

The film's Italian title reprises Dario Argento's practice of using animals in the titles of his gialli. It was released in Italy by Jumbo Cinematografica on August 17, 1971.

== Plot ==
Andrea Bild, a washed-up alcoholic, attends a New Year’s party along with some friends and acquaintances. Among them is John Lubbock, who has just witnessed his best friend and fellow teacher, Edouard Vermont propose to Isabel Lancia, whom John is in love with. There is also a doctor and his wife, Riccardo and Sofia Bini. Sofia, being crippled, seems to not be having the best time. The party also includes Helene, who was at one point romantically involved with Andrea, but could not continue due to his drinking problem. All of them seem to have a ride home, except for John who prefers to walk. Whilst walking, he is attacked and nearly killed by an unseen assailant in the tunnel. A nearby couple by the names of Walter Auer and Giulia Soavi come to John’s aid. It is implied that Walter catches a glimpse of the attacker but does not go to the police immediately.

Andrea wakes up the next morning to his girlfriend, Lu, informing him that the telephone has been ringing off the hook. When he finally answers, he hears about John’s attack, as he is a reporter. Andrea wants to get information out of John about his attacker but is stopped due to the hospital’s strict visiting rules. He learns about the two witnesses and visits Giulia, who wants nothing to do with the case and threatens to call her father. After this, Andrea returns home to find that Lu has gone out.

Not being able to get information from John Lubbock himself, Andrea pays his former lover Helene a visit. She tells him everything she knows about John, including his apparent attraction towards Isabel, which could lead to a motive for his attack. John is then shown to be escorted by Dr. Richard Bini a week after his attack. After a while, Richard checks in on Sofia at home, though he cannot stay, due to his work. As Sofia lies in bed, a record of sorts starts blasting outside her room. She crawls over to her wheelchair to investigate the noise. After finding that it has been moved away from its original place, she crawls over to the top of the stairs where she is grabbed from behind by a gloved assailant. She is strangled and thrown down the stairs.

Thinking John’s attack and Sofia’s murder might be connected, Andrea attempts to recall who could have known John was walking home that night. He states Helene, Edouard, Isabel, and Richard were the only ones he could remember. A detective informs Andrea that Richard does in fact have an alibi for when his wife was killed. He was visiting a friend, who just so happens to be Edouard. It is confirmed that the two cases are connected when they realize that a glove was found at both the John Lubbock crime scene and Sofia Bini’s. However, at Sofia’s, the glove seemed to be missing one of the spots a finger would go. They suspect that this could mean that there are four more victims on the way.

Andrea talks to Richard about the case. He claims that they had received a suspicious phone call prior to Sofia’s death, though he could not tell if it was a man or a woman. Andre gets suspicious of Richard when he later follows him. He finds him paying a large sum of cash to Walter, the witness of the John Lubbock attack. He then starts following Walter and witnesses him get in a car with Lu, his very own girlfriend. Outraged, he confronts her later that night. He learns that Walter is her brother and not in fact a lover. The next day, he finds Walter racing, as he is a professional racer. Walter keeps quiet about who he saw attack John in the tunnel and later is shown calling Richard.

Andrea finally pays John a visit. He is back at work, finishing a day of teaching his class. Though he is well enough to return to work, he still must wear a neck brace. Right as they begin talking, they are interrupted by Edouard, who teaches at the same school as John. Whilst Andrea gives John a ride home, he learns that he too had gotten a mysterious phone call, but unlike Sofia’s, he claims that there seemed to be nobody on the other end. That night while doing some work, Andrea receives a threatening call from who he presumes is the killer. The voice on the other end warns Andrea to stop pushing to solve the case.

The next day, Andrea is fired from his job. He confides in Helene, who decides to give him a chance to fix their relationship. Meanwhile, Andrea’s former boss is walking on a path through the forest where he encounters the killer. He is pursued by the knife wielding killer, but ultimately has a heart attack and dies. A funeral is held for Sofia the following day. In attendance is all the suspects, including Richard. Andrea also encounters John, still healing from his attack. Also in attendance is Edouard and his lover Isabel. Andrea later learns that his former boss who had previously fired him, had been killed the previous night. This casts suspicion upon himself as he has no alibi. He also was acquainted with the two that were killed and John, who of course survived his ordeal.

Richard, who is still Andrea’s prime suspect, attends a private get together with his friend Edouard. Here, Andrea learns that they are together to watch the young couple, Walter and Giulia, have sexual intercourse, which is illegal as they are both technically minors. This makes Andrea realize this was why Richard was previously paying Walter money. Instead of going to the police, he decides to eventually use this to get information from Walter about who he witnessed attack John. That same night, Andrea decides to talk to Edouard’s soon to be wife, Isabel. He goes to her apartment and finds that she had been killed in her very own bathroom. The usual glove, now with only two fingers remaining, is left floating in the bathtub with her.

After being informed about Isabel’s death, John gives in his notice at the school and decides to move back to Australia. He explains he has no more reason to live in Italy now with Isabel dead. Nothing has come from his stay besides being viciously attacked which left him still wearing a neck brace and finding out Isabel was going to marry his friend Edouard. Before getting information out of Walter, he attempts to try and get the truth out of Giulia once more but finds that she is not home. This is because she is prostituting herself at a nearby lake. After meeting with one of her “customers”, her throat is slit by the killer.

After not being able to find Giulia, he decides it is not worth the trouble and goes ahead and confronts Walter. It is here revealed that John’s attacker was Giulia’s father, who attacked John after mistaking him for Walter himself. The only problem is that John’s attack couldn’t have been done by the same person that’s been killing everyone as every murder has been on a Tuesday, which is when Giulia‘s father allegedly goes up North for his occupation. Gaining next to nothing from this, he confronts Richard, who claims to have not been soliciting the two minors. Nervous that the police may be onto them for their involvement in the prostitution of the two, he calls Edouard in a panic.

The following week, Helene is driven to the airport to meet with her lawyer to discuss details of the divorce she had with her ex-husband, Charles, who is also the father of their child, Tony. She will not be back until later that night however so Tony will be at home alone. This is a cause for concern Andrea realizes as it is Tuesday, which means another murder is likely to happen in their circle. Andrea rushes over to Helene’s house to find Tony being strangled by the killer, now shown to be wearing a mask. Andrea saves Tony and chases after the killer. The chase comes to a brief end once the two find themselves at an area of construction. This does not stop Andrea however from having a struggle with the killer on the second story of the construction site. The struggle ends when Andrea throws the killer over the railing. He is unmasked and revealed to be John Lubbock, who committed the murders to cover up his real motive, which was jealousy over Edouard marrying Isabel. However, in a surprising twist, John is not in love with Isabel, but rather his friend Edouard. He killed Isabel so he could be with Edouard and killed the others to make it look like the work of a psychopath who was the same person who allegedly attacked him in the tunnel. This all had become obvious when Andrea found out from Richard that John’s neck brace should have been removed weeks ago. John is appropriately put in jail for his crimes, ending the movie.

== Cast ==
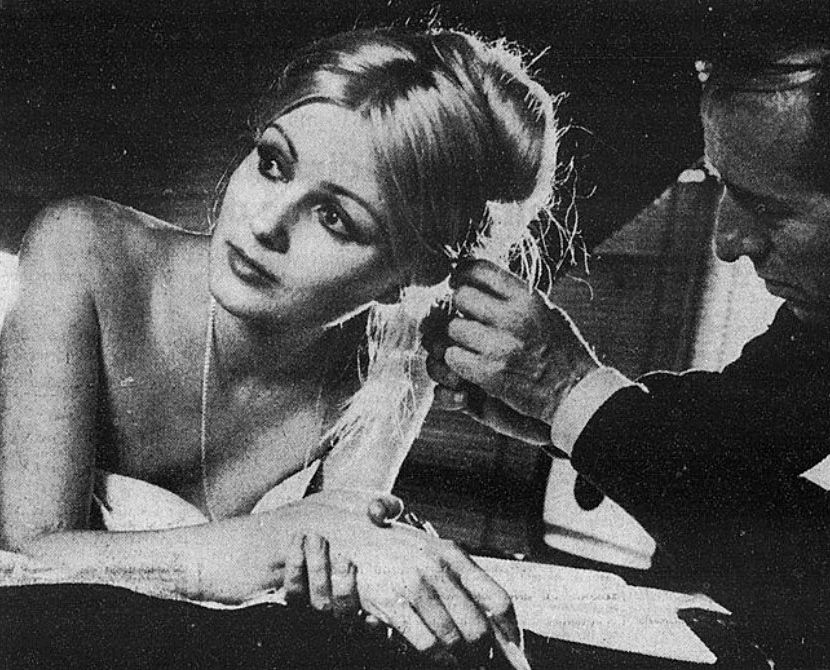
Pamela Tiffin on the set

- Franco Nero as Andrea Bild
- Silvia Monti as Helene Volta
- Pamela Tiffin as Lù Auer
- Wolfgang Preiss as Police Inspector
- Ira von Fürstenberg as Isabel Lancia
- Edmund Purdom as Edouard Vermont
- Maurizio Bonuglia as John Lubbock
- Rossella Falk as Sophia Bini
- Renato Romano as Dr. Riccardo Bini
- Guido Alberti as G. Traversi
- Agostina Belli as Giulia Soavi
- Luciano Bartoli as Walter Auer
- Corrado Gaipa as News Editor
- Andrea Scotti as Vogel
- Michael Barnes as Tony Volta (uncredited)

== Reception ==
=== Critical response ===
From a contemporary reviews, David McGillivray reviewed an 80-minute dubbed language version of the film in the Monthly Film Bulletin. McGillivray commented that the film had too many "red herrings" to make up for the films "meagre characterisation, the scrambled course of its plot, or its shamefully deceptive ending." McGillivray stated later that Bazzoni's "briskly paced direction (combined with the efforts of the British censor) contrives to sweep it all under the carpet as quickly as possible."

AllMovie called it an "outstanding giallo thriller".

Marina Antunes for the Alliance of Women Film Journalists while conceding that "Sometimes it’s just a bit too much and even the most astute viewer is likely to get lost among some of the weeds," praised the cinematography and Nero's acting, finally concluding that "While it sometimes loses its way, in the end The Fifth Cord comes together in an entertaining, occasionally awe-inspiring package that stands the test of time as a fine example of the giallo genre."
