= Hans (film) =

- Directed by: Louis Nero
- Written by: Louis Nero
- Produced by: Louis Nero
- Starring: Franco Nero
- Cinematography: Louis Nero
- Edited by: Louis Nero
- Music by: Tiziano Lamberti
- Release date: 2006
- Running time: 104 minutes
- Country: Italy
- Language: Italian

Hans is a 2006 Italian film directed by Louis Nero.

== Plot ==
Hans is the story of the increasing paranoia of Hans Schabe, the lead character and a disturbed individual, whose schizophrenia has accompanied him throughout his life.

== Cast ==
- Daniele Savoca as Hans Schabe
- Simona Nasi as Girlfriend
- Franco Nero as Judge/Tramp
- Eugenio Allegri as mad
- Silvano Agosti as Tramp
- Sax Nicosia as TV Man
