= Golem (2000 film) =

- Directed by: Louis Nero
- Written by: Louis Nero
- Produced by: Louis Nero
- Starring: Moni Ovadia
- Cinematography: Louis Nero
- Edited by: Louis Nero
- Music by: Fabrizio Bertolami
- Release date: 2000
- Running time: 104 minutes
- Country: Italy
- Language: Italian

Golem is a 2000 Italian film directed by Louis Nero.

== Plot ==
The mythical figure of the Golem, a statue-automaton, wanders between the cities of Turin, Prague and Lyon, in search of his mysterious creator.

== Cast ==
- Marco Giachino: Golem
- Antonio Villella: First Keeper
- Savino Genovese: Second Keeper
- Vincenzo Fiorito: Rabbi Loew
- Aidi Tamburrino: Ballerina
- Eloisa Perone: Mask
