= Mirka (film) =

- Promotional poster
- Directed by: Rachid Benhadj
- Written by: Rachid Benhadj
- Produced by: Piero Amati
- Starring: Vanessa Redgrave; Gérard Depardieu; Sergio Rubini; Franco Nero
- Cinematography: Vittorio Storaro
- Edited by: Anna Rosa Napoli
- Distributed by: Mikado film
- Release dates: 10 March 2000 (Italy); 9 June 2000 (Spain)
- Running time: 107 minutes
- Countries: Italy; France; Spain
- Language: Italian

Mirka is a 2000 drama film starring Vanessa Redgrave and Gérard Depardieu. The international co-production was written and directed by Algerian-born filmmaker Rachid Benhadj. Although countries are unnamed, several publications make reference to the film as a document of Bosnian Genocide. It was released in Italy on 10 March 2000 and received its international premiere at the Thessaloniki International Film Festival on 21 November 2005.

== Plot ==
Mirka is searching for his mother in an unidentified Balkan nation, he is befriended by Strix (Depardieu) who promises to help. Kalsan (Redgrave) is surprised at the sudden arrival of Mirka, a foreign child in her midst. In a turn of events, it emerges that he is her great-grandson. Unlike the villagers that participated in a silent infanticide against ethnic rape children, Kalsan saved Mirka and took him to a city orphanage. The tragic story is unveiled by Kalsan's niece, Elena who became pregnant with Mirka after being the victim of an ethnic war rape. Elena has long believed her child to be dead so his appearance shakes the fabric of the household. Mirka's ethnicity leads to his persecution by the villagers.

== Cast ==
- Vanessa Redgrave as Kalsan
- Gérard Depardieu as Strix
- Karim Benhadj as Mirka
- Barbora Bobuľová as Elena
- Sergio Rubini as Helmut
- Michele Melega as Tico
- Franco Nero
- Arnaldo Ninchi
- Sandro Dori

== Production ==
The Italian-French-Spanish co-production was shot in 1999 in Trentino-Alto Adige/Südtirol.

The director, Rachid Benhadj cast his son, Karim in the titular role. The film also received funding from the Italian government and the Euroimages Fund of the Council of Europe.

Benhadj described his reasoning for the narrative, "History repeats itself against women. They are victims of violence and rape in war and in emergency situations".

== Reception ==
Alberto Crespi of l'Unità described the film as "timeless", enforcing that the strength of the film lies in the violent nature of the circumstances. The newspaper felt that some of the international casting was unsettling but felt Redgrave gave a good performance. Although Crespi felt Bobuľová was perfectly cast in the role of Elena. He also praised Benhadj's "intense" performance as the titular character and described it as a "generous" film.

Roberto Nepoti of la Repubblica said it was the first film to show how ethnic rape is used as a weapon to "pollute" a biological race and ensure the dominance of another. Nepoti praised Redgrave's "committed" performance, mirroring her real-life battles in defence of civilization. He continued to praise the casting of Bobuľová, Benhadj and Rubini as well as the cinematography of Storato. He also praised the director for going against the traditional mould of Yugoslavian war films, and instead creating a more universal film.
