= Giovanni Comisso =

Italian writer

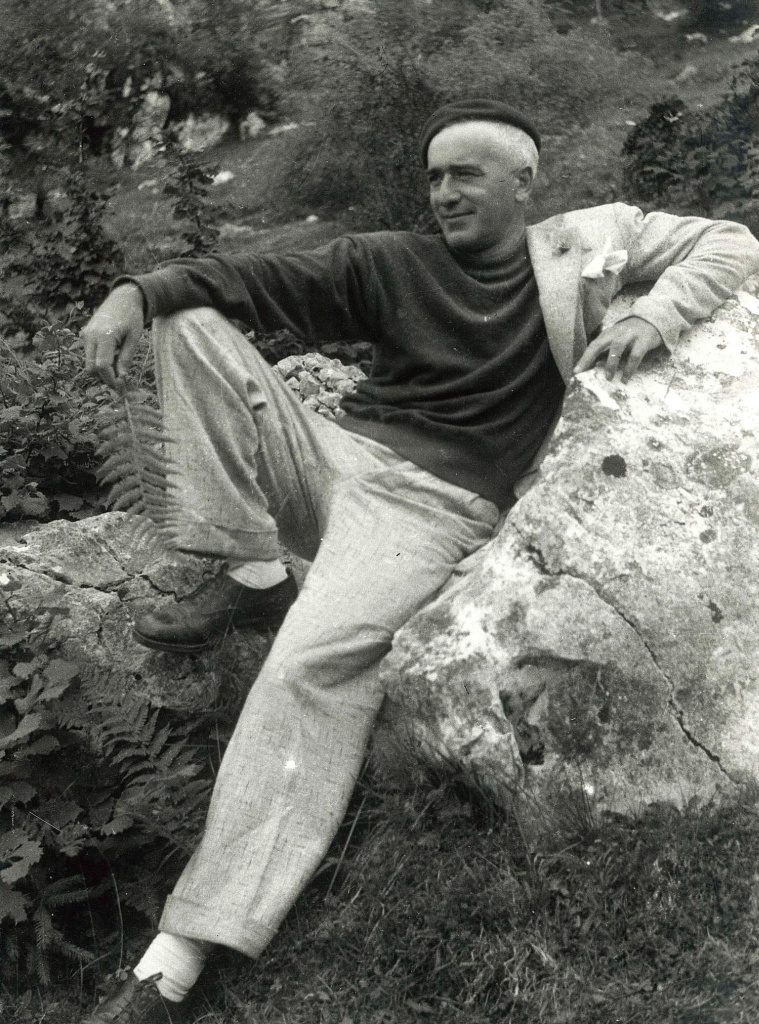
- Born: 3 October 1895 Treviso, Italy
- Died: 21 January 1969 (aged 73)

Giovanni Comisso (3 October 1895 – 21 January 1969) was an important Italian writer of the twentieth century, appreciated by Eugenio Montale, Umberto Saba, Gianfranco Contini and many others.

== Life ==
Comisso was born in Treviso, where, during his adolescence, he met and got to know the sculptor Arturo Martini who introduced him to the writings of Arthur Rimbaud and Friedrich Nietzsche. In 1915, he enlisted in the Telegraph Corps of Engineers and participated in the Great War. Together with Gabriele d’Annunzio, he took part in the Fiume enterprise (1919–1920), an experience that would be fundamental to his development as a writer. The following years were years of travel, both along the Adriatic aboard a sailing ship with the sailors of Chioggia, and in Europe and North Africa on behalf of a number of important newspapers. He lived for long periods in Paris, between 1927 and 1928, with his friend the painter Filippo De Pisis. The following year, in 1929, as a special correspondent for the "Corriere della Sera", he completed the Grand Tour in the Far East visiting China, Japan and Russia from Siberia to Moscow. After much wandering he wanted to take root in the Veneto countryside and with the proceeds of the articles, on his return, he bought a house and fields in Zero Branco, a town in the Treviso area, while continuing to travel along Italy as a special correspondent for several newspapers. Here he experienced intense periods of writing and friendship and later learned of the bombing of Treviso, where the family home was destroyed. He closed the house in Zero Branco to return to live in Treviso only in 1954 after his mother's death. In his later years, he continued to write and publish short stories and novels, in which there are detailed descriptions of despair, disappointments, anxieties and dislikes together with many ironic and bitter descriptions of man’s failings. "Our life today is reduced to these extremes from which serenity, beauty and harmony are excluded.” He died in a hospital on 21 January 1969.

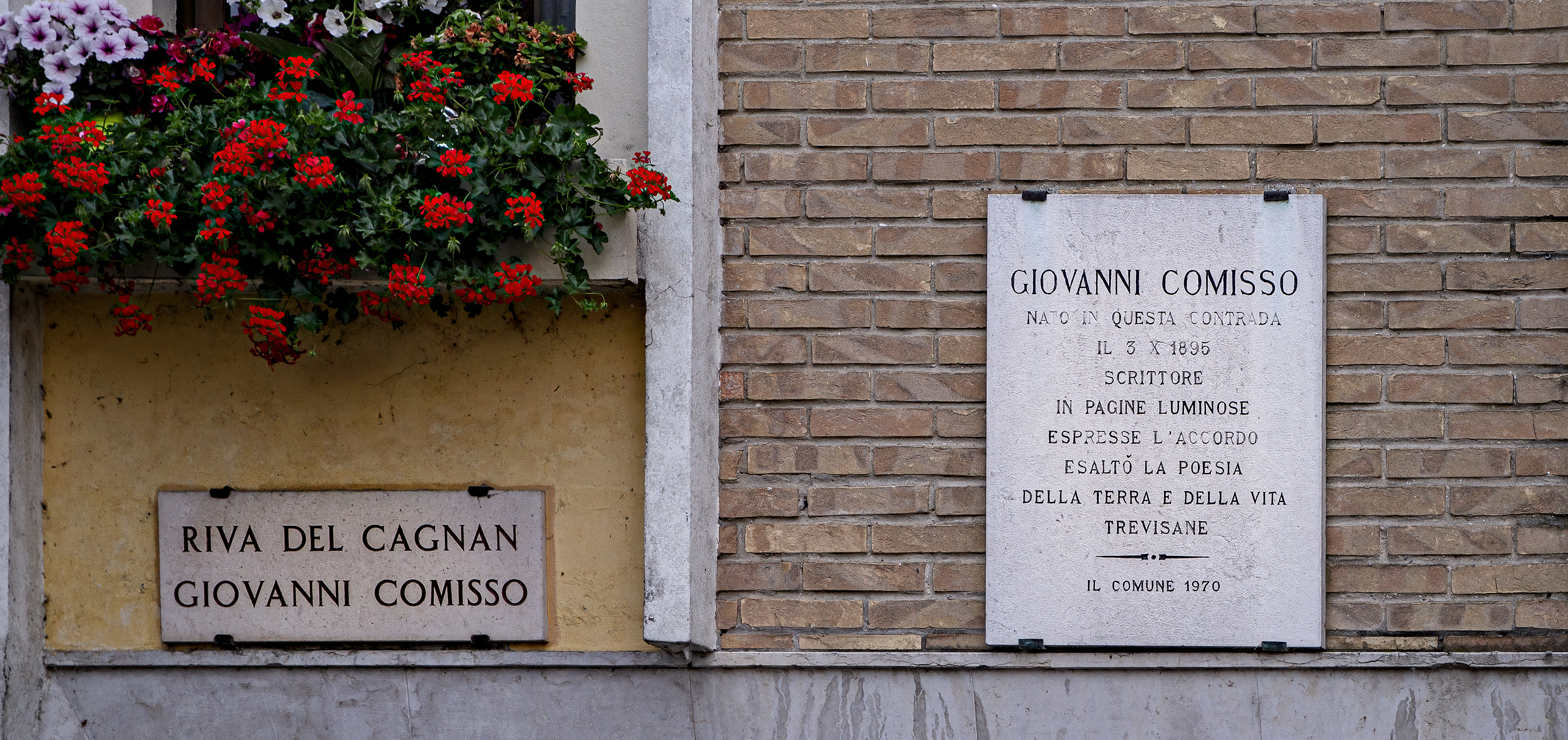
Commemorative plaque of Giovanni Comisso in Treviso

== Works ==
=== Novels and Short Stories ===
- Il porto dell'amore, Antonio Vianello, Treviso, 1924; rpt. as Al vento dell'Adriatico, Ribet, Torino 1928; Ed. di Treviso, Treviso 1953; Longanesi, Milano 1959 (rpt. again as Il porto dell'amore); Oscar Mondadori, 1983 (with an Introduction by Carlo della Corte); Longanesi, Milano 2011 (with a foreword by Nico Naldini)
- Gente di mare, Treves, Milano 1928 (Premio Bagutta); Ed. di Treviso, Treviso 1953; Longanesi, Milano 1966 (Opere, 9); Neri Pozza, Vicenza 1994 (with a foreword by Naldini)
- Giorni di guerra, Mondadori, 1930; Longanesi, Milano 1960 (Opere, 1); Oscar Mondadori, 1980 (with an Introduction by Mario Isnenghi)
- Il delitto di Fausto Diamante, Ceschina, Milano 1933; Sodalizio del libro, Venezia 1958; Longanesi, Milano 1963 (with Storia di un patrimonio in Opere, 4); Neri Pozza, Vicenza 1995
- Storia di un patrimonio, Treves, Milano 1933; Mondadori, Milano 1956; Longanesi, Milano 1963 (Opere, 4); Neri Pozza, Vicenza 1995 (with Il delitto di Fausto Diamante)
- Avventure terrene, Vallecchi, Firenze 1935
- I due compagni, Mondadori, Milano 1936; Longanesi, Milano 1973 (Opere, 13)
- L'italiano errante per l'Italia, Parenti, Firenze 1937
- Felicità dopo la noia, Mondadori, Milano 1940
- Un inganno d'amore, Mondadori, Milano 1942 (including La ricchezza di Mario); rpt. as Un inganno d'amore e alcuni racconti, 1953
- La favorita, Mondadori, Milano 1945; Longanesi, Milano 1965 (Opere, 7)
- I sentimenti nell'arte, Il tridente, Venezia 1945
- La terra e i contadini e altri racconti, with illustrations by Filippo de Pisis, Vallecchi, Firenze 1946; Galleria Pegaso, Forte dei Marmi 1993
- Capriccio e illusione, Mondadori, Milano 1947
- Amori d'oriente, Longanesi, Milano 1949; 1965 (Opere, 6); Fabbri, Milano 2006 (with a presentation by Mario Monti)
- Gioventù che muore, Milano-Sera, Milano 1949; Roma, Gherardo Casini, 1965; Longanesi, Milano 1971
- Viaggi felici, Garzanti, Milano 1949; Longanesi, Milano 1966 (Opere, 8)
- Le mie stagioni, Garzanti, Milano 1951; Longanesi, Milano 1963 (Opere, 3); ivi 1985 (with Viaggi felici e Donne gentili) (autobiographical)
- Un gatto attraversa la strada, Mondadori, Milano 1954 (Premio Strega); Club degli editori, Milano 1969 (with a foreword by Guido Piovene); Utet, Torino 2006
- La mia casa di campagna, Longanesi, Milano 1958; 1968 (Opere, 10); 2008 (with an Introduction by Paolo Mauri)
- Satire italiane, Longanesi, Milano 1960 (Opere, 2); 2008 (with an Introduction by Ernesto Ferrero)
- La donna del lago, Longanesi, Milano 1962; 1968 (Opere, 12); Guanda, Parma 1993 (including Cribol)
- Cribol, Longanesi, Milano 1964; 1968 (including La donna del lago in Opere, 12); Guanda, Parma 1993 (with La donna del lago)
- Il grande ozio, Longanesi, Milano 1964 (Opere, 5); Libri Scheiwiller, Milano 1987 (Ed. Nico Naldini)
- Pesca notturna e altre pagine, Eds. Silvio Guarnieri and Marino Buffoni, Mursia, Milano 1964
- Gioco d'infanzia, Longanesi, Milano 1965 (with Amori d'oriente, in Opere, 6); Guanda, Parma 1994 (with an Appendix ed. by Nico Naldini)
- Busta chiusa, presentation by Ruggero Jacobbi, Nuova Accademia, Milano 1965
- Attraverso il tempo, Longanesi, Milano 1968 (Opere, 11)
- Diario 1951–1964, with a memory by Goffredo Parise, Longanesi, Milano 1969 (postumo)
- Il sereno dopo la nebbia, Eds. Silvio Guarnieri and Giancarlo Bertoncini, Longanesi, Milano 1974 (Opere, 14) (postumo)
- Storie di una vita. Trent'anni al Gazzettino, Ed. Alberto Frasson, Edizioni del Gazzettino, Mestre 1982
- Caro Toni, Ed. Gian Antonio Cibotto, Longanesi, Milano 1983
- Veneto felice. Itinerari e racconti, Ed. Nico Naldini, Longanesi, Milano 1984; n. ed. 2005
- Al sud, Ed. Nico Naldini, foreword by Raffaele La Capria, Neri Pozza, Vicenza 1995
- Una donna al giorno, presentation by Gian Antonio Cibotto, Neri Pozza, Vicenza 1996
- Opere, Eds. Rolando Damiani and Nico Naldini, I Meridiani Mondadori, Milano 2002 (including: Il porto dell'amore – Gente di mare – Giorni di guerra – Storia di un patrimonio – Un inganno d'amore – Gioco d'infanzia – Racconti – Amori d'Oriente – Le mie stagioni – La mia casa di campagna – La virtù leggendaria)

=== Poems ===
- Poesie, Longo e Zoppelli, Treviso 1916; Canova, Treviso 1995 (rpt. Ed. Emilio Lippi)
- Bassa marea, Libreria Editrice Canova, Treviso 1946
