= Franco Nero =

Italian actor (born 1941)

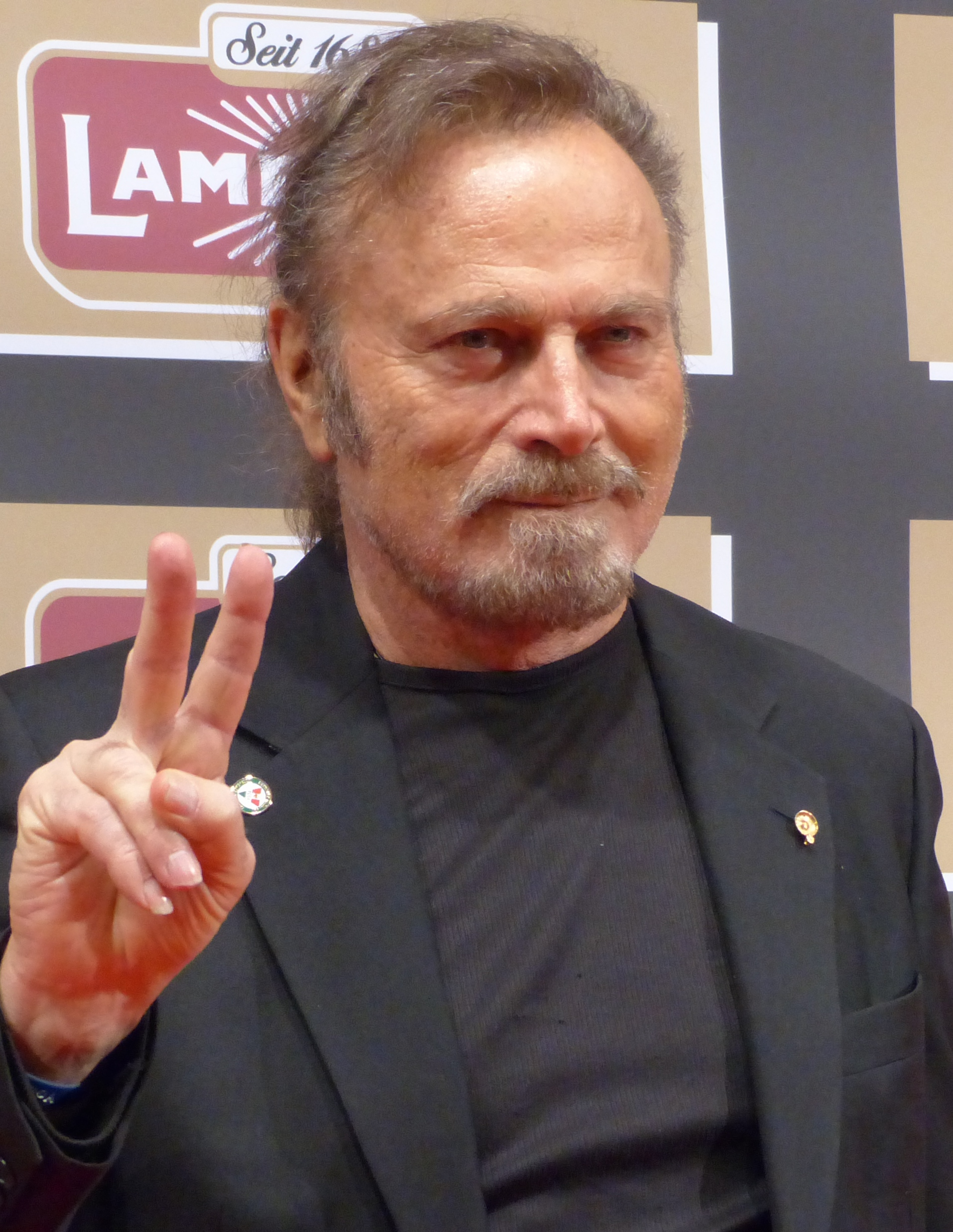
- Nero in 2016
- Born: Francesco Clemente Giuseppe Sparanero; 23 November 1941 (age 84); Parma, Emilia-Romagna, Kingdom of Italy
- Occupations: Actor; producer; director
- Years active: 1962–present
- Spouse: Vanessa Redgrave (m. 2006)
- Children: 2, including Carlo
- Relatives: Natasha Richardson (stepdaughter); Joely Richardson (stepdaughter)

Francesco Clemente Giuseppe Sparanero (born 23 November 1941), known professionally as Franco Nero, is an Italian actor. His breakthrough role was as the title character in the Spaghetti Western film Django (1966), which made him a pop culture icon and launched an international career that includes over 200 leading and supporting roles in a wide variety of films and television productions.

During the 1960s and 1970s, Nero was actively involved in many popular Italian "genre trends", including polizieschi, gialli, and Spaghetti Westerns. His best-known films include The Bible: In the Beginning... (1966), Camelot (1967), The Day of the Owl (1968), The Mercenary (1968), Battle of Neretva (1969), Tristana (1970), Compañeros (1970), Confessions of a Police Captain (1971), The Fifth Cord (1971), High Crime (1973), Street Law (1974), Keoma (1976), Hitch-Hike (1977), Force 10 from Navarone (1978), Enter the Ninja (1981), Die Hard 2 (1990), Letters to Juliet (2010), Cars 2 (2011), John Wick: Chapter 2 (2017), and The Pope's Exorcist (2023).

Nero has had a long relationship with Vanessa Redgrave, which began during the filming of Camelot. With Redgrave, Nero starred in two films directed by Tinto Brass: Dropout (1970) and La Vacanza (1971). They were married in 2006, and are the parents of the actor Carlo Gabriel Nero (b.1969).

== Early life ==
Francesco Clemente Giuseppe Sparanero was born in San Prospero Parmense (Parma, Emilia-Romagna), the son of a commissioned officer in the Carabinieri. His parents were originally from San Severo (Foggia, Apulia). He grew up in Bedonia and in Milan. He studied briefly at the Economy and Trade faculty of the local university, before leaving to study at the Piccolo Teatro di Milano.

== Career ==
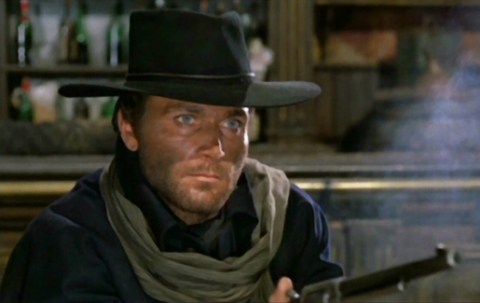
Nero as the title character in Django (1966)

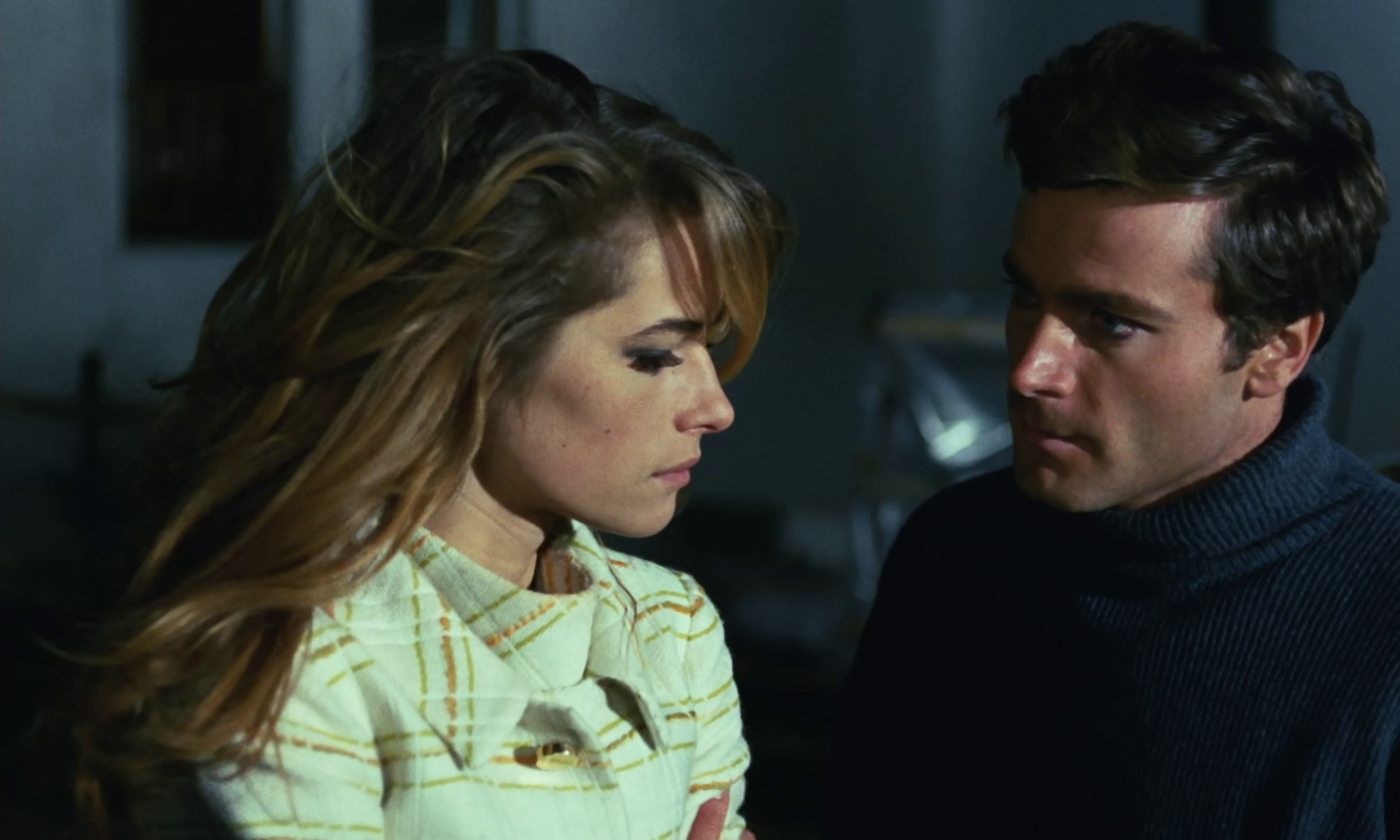
Nero with Charlotte Rampling in Sardinia Kidnapped (1968)

Nero's first film role was a small part in Pelle viva (1962). An early leading role followed in Mino Guerrini's horror film The Third Eye, which entered production in June 1965 but was not released until after Django in 1966. His breakthrough role came as the title character in Sergio Corbucci's Django (1966), a Spaghetti Western that became one of his best-known films. His other films released in 1966 included Texas, Adios and Massacre Time.

In 1967, he appeared in Camelot as Lancelot, where Nero met his longtime romantic partner, and later his wife, Vanessa Redgrave. Following this he appeared in the mafia film The Day of the Owl opposite Claudia Cardinale released in 1968.

A lack of proficiency in English tended to limit these roles, although Nero also appeared in other English-language films including The Virgin and the Gypsy (1970), Force 10 from Navarone (1978), Enter the Ninja (1981) and Die Hard 2 (1990).

Although often typecast in films like Los amigos (1973) or Keoma (1976) he has attempted an impressive range of characters, such as Abel in John Huston's epic The Bible: In The Beginning (1966), the humiliated engineer out for revenge in Street Law, the gay lieutenant in Querelle (1982), and Serbian mediaeval hero in The Falcon (1983). Nero has appeared in over 150 films, and has written, produced and starred in one: Jonathan degli orsi (1993).

More recently, Nero starred in Hungarian director Gábor Koltay's Honfoglalás (Conquest) in 1996, in Li chiamarono... briganti! (1999) by Pasquale Squitieri and subsequently in Koltay's Sacra Corona (Holy Crown) in 2001.

In 2009, Nero played an eccentric author called "Mario Puzzo" in Mord ist mein Geschäft, Liebling ("Murder is my trade, darling", Italian title "Tesoro, sono un killer"). German critics found his performance was the best part of the film: "Having Franco Nero playing in this film is really a great joy – it is only regrettable that after his appearances there is still so much film left."

In 2010, Nero appeared in the film Letters to Juliet with Redgrave. In 2011, he appeared as a guest star on the season 13 premiere episode of Law & Order: Special Victims Unit. His character, although Italian, was based on Dominique Strauss-Kahn. In the same year, he received a star on the Italian Walk of Fame in Toronto, Ontario, Canada.

In 2012, Nero made a cameo appearance in the film Django Unchained in one scene alongside Jamie Foxx, who stars as Django Freeman in the film. Nero, playing the original Django, questions Foxx's Django about how his name is spelled, and asks him to spell it, referencing a scene from Nero's role as Django in the original Django film. Upon learning that their names are spelled the same way, Nero's Django says "I know" to Foxx's Django.

In 2016 and 2017, he interpreted Gabriele Tinti's poetry, giving voice to the masterpieces in the National Roman Museum.

Nero appears in the dark comedy feature film The Immortalist in 2020, along with Sherilyn Fenn, Paul Rodriguez, Aries Spears and Jeff DuJardin, directed by Vlad Kozlov.

In June 2024, principal photography was completed on The Estate, a feature drama, executive produced by Nero, his wife Vanessa Redgrave, and son Carlo Gabriel Nero. The film is written and directed by his son, and stars Nero and Vanessa Redgrave.

In May 2025, Nero joined the cast of Bertrand Mandico's upcoming film Roma Elastica.

He was given a star on the Hollywood Walk of Fame in 2026.

== Personal life ==
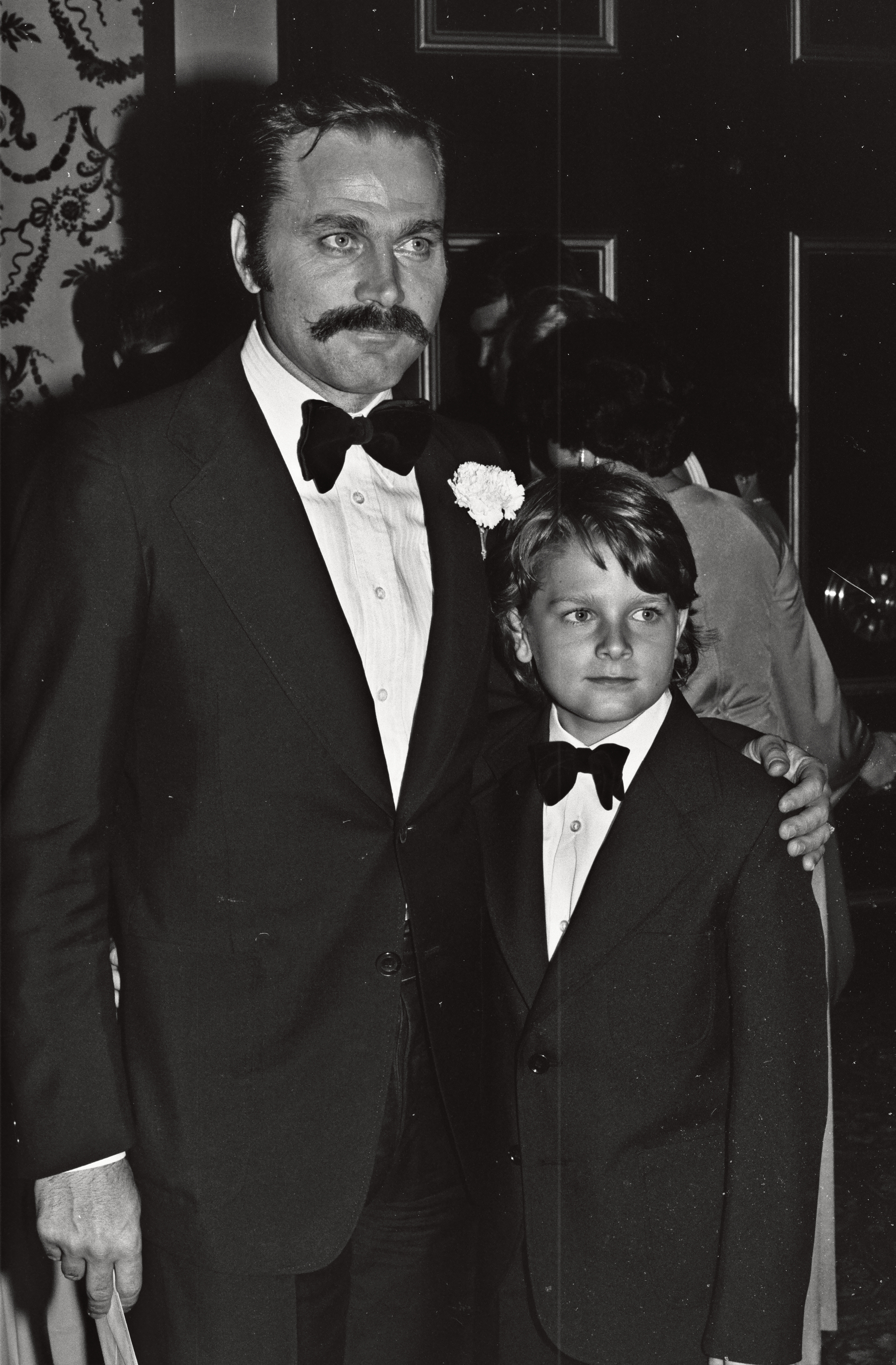
Nero with his son Carlo in 1979

His romantic involvement with English actress Vanessa Redgrave began in 1966 when they met on the set of Camelot. In 1969, they had a son, Carlo Gabriel Redgrave Sparanero (known professionally as Carlo Gabriel Nero), a screenwriter and director. After separating for many years, during which they both had relationships with other people, they reunited and married on 31 December 2006. Carlo Nero directed Redgrave in the cinematic adaptation of Wallace Shawn's play The Fever.

Nero dated actresses Catherine Deneuve, Goldie Hawn and Ursula Andress in the 1970s.

In 1983, he had a second son, Frank Sparanero (also known as Frankie Nero or Frank Nero Jr). Born in Rome by Danica Pevec (a.k.a. Alexandra Romanov), Frankie began his acting career with Pupi Avati in 1996 at a film Festival and then 1999 with the film Buck and the Magic Bracelet by Tonino Ricci. In addition to being an actor, he is also an artist, architect and photographer.

In December 1987, a paternity suit was filed against him in court in Colombia where he was filming a movie. Mauricia Mena claimed that Nero had fathered her son Franquito after a brief romantic affair.

In 1994, Nero walked his future stepdaughter Natasha Richardson (1963–2009) down the aisle when she married actor Liam Neeson. Her father, Tony Richardson, had died in 1991.

== Filmography ==
Key
†	Denotes films that have not yet been released

=== Film ===
Year	Title	Role	Director	Notes
1965	I Knew Her Well	Italo	Antonio Pietrangeli	
1965	The Tramplers	Charley Garvey	Albert Band	
1965	Wild, Wild Planet	Lt. Jake Jacowitz	Antonio Margheriti	
1966	War of the Planets	Lt. Jake Jacowitz	Antonio Margheriti	
1966	Hired Killer	Tony Lo Bello	Franco Prosperi	
1966	Django	Django	Sergio Corbucci	
1966	Massacre Time	Tom Corbett	Lucio Fulci	
1966	The Third Eye	Mino Alberti	Mino Guerrini	
1966	Texas, Adios	Sheriff Burt Sullivan	Ferdinando Baldi	
1966	The Bible: In the Beginning...	Abel	John Huston	First American film
1967	Man, Pride and Vengeance	Don José	Luigi Bazzoni	
1967	Camelot	Lancelot du Lac	Joshua Logan	Singing voice by Gene Merlino; Nominated—Golden Globe Award for Most Promising Newcomer – Male
1968	The Day of the Owl	Capt. Claudio Bellodi	Damiano Damiani	David di Donatello Award for Best Actor
1968	Sardinia Kidnapped	Gavino	Gianfranco Mingozzi	
1968	The Mercenary	Sergei "Polack" Kowalski	Sergio Corbucci	
1968	A Quiet Place in the Country	Leonardo Ferri	Elio Petri	
1969	The Fifth Day of Peace	Ensign Bruno Grauber	Giuliano Montaldo	
1969	Detective Belli	Detective Stefano Belli	Romolo Guerrieri	
1969	Battle of Neretva	Capt. Michele Riva	Veljko Bulajić	
1970	Tristana	Horacio	Luis Buñuel	
1970	The Virgin and the Gypsy	The Gypsy	Christopher Miles	Nominated—Golden Laurel Award for Star of Tomorrow, Male
1970	Dropout	Bruno Grazza	Tinto Brass	
1970	Compañeros	Yodlaf Peterson	Sergio Corbucci	
1971	The Case Is Closed, Forget It	Vanzi	Damiano Damiani	
1971	Confessions of a Police Captain	Deputy D.A. Traini	Damiano Damiani	Italian Golden Globe Award for Best Actor
1971	The Fifth Cord	Andrea Bild	Luigi Bazzoni	
1971	La vacanza	Osiride	Tinto Brass	
1971	Long Live Your Death	Dmitri Vassilovich Orlowsky	Duccio Tessari	
1972	Pope Joan	Louis II of Italy	Michael Anderson	
1972	The Monk	Ambrosio	Ado Kyrou	
1973	Redneck	Mosquito	Silvio Narizzano	
1973	Deaf Smith & Johnny Ears	Johnny Ears	Paolo Cavara	
1973	The Assassination of Matteotti	Giacomo Matteotti	Florestano Vancini	
1973	High Crime	Vice Commissioner Alessandro Nelli	Enzo G. Castellari	
1973	White Fang	Jason Scott	Lucio Fulci	
1973	Blood Brothers	Nicola Bellizzi	Pasquale Squitieri	
1974	Last Days of Mussolini	Walter "Valerio" Audisio	Carlo Lizzani	
1974	Street Law	Carlo Antonelli	Enzo G. Castellari	
1974	Challenge to White Fang	Jason Scott	Lucio Fulci	
1975	Smiling Maniacs	Judge Roberto Dani	Marcello Aliprandi	
1975	How to Kill a Judge	Giacomo Solaris	Damiano Damiani	
1975	Cry, Onion!	Onion Stark	Enzo G. Castellari	
1975	The Flower in His Mouth	Professor Michele Belcore	Luigi Zampa	
1976	Victory March	Capt. Asciutto	Marco Bellocchio	
1976	Death Rite	Sadry	Claude Chabrol	
1976	Submission	Armand	Salvatore Samperi	
1976	Keoma	Keoma Shannon	Enzo G. Castellari	
1977	Sahara Cross	Jean Bellard	Tonino Valerii	
1977	Hitch-Hike	Walter Mancini	Pasquale Festa Campanile	
1978	Force 10 from Navarone	Captain Nicolai Lescovar \ Colonel von Ingorslebon	Guy Hamilton	
1979	The Visitor	Jesus Christ	Giulio Paradisi	Uncredited
1979	Mimi	Guido	Florestano Vancini	
1979	The Shark Hunter	Mike DiDonato	Enzo G. Castellari	
1980	The Man with Bogart's Face	Hakim	Robert Day	
1980	The Blue-Eyed Bandit	Renzo Dominici	Alfredo Giannetti	
1980	Day of the Cobra	Larry Stanzani	Enzo G. Castellari	
1981	The Salamander	Carabinieri Colonel Dante Matucci	Peter Zinner	
1981	The Falcon	Strahinja Banović	Vatroslav Mimica	
1981	Enter the Ninja	Cole	Menahem Golan	
1982	Red Bells	John Reed	Sergei Bondarchuk	
1982	Kamikaze 1989	Weiss	Wolf Gremm	
1982	Querelle	Lieutenant Seblon	Rainer Werner Fassbinder	
1982	Grog	Nicola Fanelli	Francesco Laudadio	
1983	Red Bells II	John Reed	Sergei Bondarchuk	
1985	Andre Handles Them All	André	Peter Fratzscher	
1985	The Repenter	Judge Falco	Pasquale Squitieri	
1987	Sweet Country	Paul	Michael Cacoyannis	
1987	The Girl	Johan Berg	Arne Mattsson	
1987	Django Strikes Again	Django	Nello Rossati	
1987	Grosso guaio a Cartagena	Francis	Tommaso Dazzi	
1988	Top Line	Ted Angelo	Nello Rossati	
1988	Pigmalione 88	Lorenzo	Flavio Mogherini	
1988	Young Toscanini	Claudio Toscanini	Franco Zeffirelli	
1988	Magdalene	Janza	Monica Teuber	
1988	Run for Your Life	Comissare	Terence Young	
1990	Die Hard 2	General Ramon Esperanza	Renny Harlin	
1990	Breath of Life	Gesulado	Beppe Cino	
1991	Amelia Lópes O'Neill	Fernando	Valeria Sarmiento	
1992	Brothers and Sisters	Franco	Pupi Avati	
1992	Crimson Dawn	Paul Herzog	Marcello Aliprandi	
1992	Zoloto	Gabriele da Poppi	Fabio Bonzi	
1992	The Player	Himself	Robert Altman	Scene deleted
1993	The Lucona Affair	Enzo Lombardo	Jack Gold	
1993	Jonathan of the Bears	Jonathan Kowalski	Enzo G. Castellari	
1995	Io e il re	Major Ferri	Lucio Gaudino	
1996	The Italians Are Coming	Luigi	Eyal Halfon	
1996	The Innocent Sleep	Adolfo Cavani	Scott Michell	
1996	The Conquest	Árpád	Gábor Koltay	
1997	Il tocco – La sfida	Jesus Barro	Enrico Coletti	
1997	La medaglia	Ferrero	Sergio Rossi	
1998	The Versace Murder	Gianni Versace	Menahem Golan	
1998	Talk of Angels	Dr. Vicente Areavaga	Nick Hamm	
1999	Brigands	Nerza	Pasquale Squitieri	
1999	Uninvited	Ralph Barolo	Carlo Gabriel Nero	
2000	Mirka	Giancarlo	Rachid Benhadj	
2000	Winds of Passion	Michele Giangrande	Sandro Cecca	
2001	Chimera	The Businessman	Pappi Corsicato	
2001	Sacra Corona	Bishop Gellért	Gábor Koltay	
2001	The Sleeping Wife	Marco	Silvano Agosti	
2001	Megiddo: The Omega Code 2	General Michelangelo Francini	Brian Trenchard-Smith	
2002	Fumata blanca	Cardinal Tura	Miquel García Borda	
2002	Ultimo stadio	Antonio	Ivano De Matteo	
2004	Post Coitum	Bakchus	Juraj Jakubisko	
2004	Guardians of the Clouds	Il Padre	Luciano Odorisio	
2005	Forever Blues	Luca	Franco Nero	Also directorial debut
2006	Hans	The Magistrate	Louis Nero	
2006	Amore e libertà – Masaniello	Vicerè D'Arcos	Angelo Antonucci	
2007	Mineurs	Michele Acucella	Fulvio Wetzl	
2008	Márió, a varázsló	Mario	Tamás Almási	
2008	Bastardi	Rene Iuvara	Federico Del Zoppo, Andres Alce Meldonado	
2008	The Rage	Mentore	Louis Nero	
2008	Bathory: Countess of Blood	King Mathias II of Hungary	Juraj Jakubisko	
2008	Ti stramo - Ho voglia di un'ultima notte da manuale prima di tre baci sopra il cielo	Vagrant	Pino Insegno, Gianluca Sodaro	Cameo
2009	Mord ist mein Geschäft, Liebling	Enrico Puzzo	Sebastian Niemann	
2009	Palestrina - Prince of Music	Domenico Ferrabosco	Georg Brintrup	
2010	Angelus Hiroshimae	The Hunter	Giancarlo Planta	
2010	Letters to Juliet	Lorenzo Bartolini	Gary Winick	
2010	Prigioniero di un segreto	Vagrant	Carlo Fusco	
2011	Rasputin	Narrator	Louis Nero	
2011	New Order	Dr. Cornelius Van Morgen	Marco Rosson	
2011	Father	Enrico	Pasquale Squitieri	
2011	Cars 2	Uncle Topolino	John Lasseter	Voice
2012	Canepazzo	Alvaro Genta	David Petrucci	
2012	A Memória que me Contam	Paolo	Lúcia Murat	
2012	Django Unchained	Amerigo Vessepi	Quentin Tarantino	Cameo
2012	The Woods	Enzo Philipo	Michael Mandell	
2013	Cadences obstinées	Carmine	Fanny Ardant	
2013	Dante's Inferno: An Animated Epic	Circles Introduction	Mike Disa; Shukō Murase; Yasuomi Umetsu; Victor Cook; Jong-Sik Nam; Kim Sang-jin; Lee Seung-Gyu	Voice; Italian version only
2014	Nymph	Niko	Milan Todorović	
2014	Love Island	Marquis Polesini	Jasmila Žbanić	
2014	Figli di Maam	Herod	Paolo Consorti	
2016	Il Ragazzo della Giudecca	Salvatore	Alfonso Bergamo	
2016	The Lost City of Z	Baron de Gondoriz	James Gray	
2017	The Neighborhood	Guglielmo	Frank D'Angelo	
2017	John Wick: Chapter 2	Julius	Chad Stahelski	
2017	Il crimine non va in pensione	Primario	Fabio Fulco	
2017	Iceman	Ditob	Felix Randau	
2017	The Time of Their Lives	Alberto	Roger Goldby	
2018	The Broken Key	Hiram Abif	Louis Nero	
2018	Red Land	Professor Ambrosin	Maximiliano Hernando Bruno	
2018	A Rose in Winter	Rainer Praeger	Joshua Sinclair	
2019	Ed è subito sera	Rosario De Martino	Claudio Insegno	
2019	The Collini Case	Fabrizio Collini	Marco Kreuzpaintner	
2020	Recon	Angelo	Robert David Port	
2021	The Match	Branko	Jakov Sedlar, Dominik Sedlar	
2021	Off the Rails	Giovanni	Jules Williamson	
2021	Immortalist	Paolo	Vladislav Kozlov	
2022	The Man from Rome	The Pope	Sergio Dow	
2022	The Man Who Drew God	Emanuele	Franco Nero	Also director
2023	The Pope's Exorcist	The Pope	Julius Avery	Nominated - Golden Raspberry Award for Worst Supporting Actor
2023	Silent Life: The Story of the Lady in Black	Rudolph Valentino's Spirit	Vladislav Alex Kozlov	
2024	Giorni Felici	Antonio	Simone Petralia	
2025	In the Hand of Dante	Don Lecco	Julian Schnabel	
2025	Milarepa	Old Man	Louis Nero	
2026	Roma Elastica	Italian director	Bertrand Mandico	

=== Television ===
Year	Title	Role	Director	Notes
1975	The Legend of Valentino	Rudolph Valentino	Melville Shavelson	Television film
1976	21 Hours at Munich	Luttif Afif	William A. Graham	Television film
1978	The Pirate	Sheikh Baydr Al-Fay the Pirate	Ken Annakin	Television miniseries
1979	Le rose di Danzica	General Konrad van Der Berg	Alberto Bevilacqua	Television miniseries
1983	Wagner	Crespi	Tony Palmer	Television miniseries
1983	Die Försterbuben	Andreas Boehme	Peter Patzak	Television film
1984	The Last Days of Pompeii	Arbaces	Peter R. Hunt	Television miniseries
1985	Un marinaio e mezzo	Nick	Tommaso Dazzi	Television film
1985	The Hitchhiker	Dr. Peter Milne	Mai Zetterling	Episode: "Murderous Feelings"
1986	Un altare per la madre		Edith Bruck	Television film
1987	Il generale	Giuseppe Garibaldi	Luigi Magni	Television miniseries
1988	Windmills of the Gods	Ionescu	Lee Philips	Television miniseries
1989	The Magistrate	Paolo Pizzi	Kathy Mueller	Television miniseries
1989	The Betrothed	Friar Cristoforo	Salvatore Nocita	Television miniseries
1990	Blaues Blut	Sandro Castellani	Sidney Hayers	Episode: "Gegen die Uhr"
1990	Oggi ho vinto anch'io	Saverio Palluca	Lodovico Gasparini	Television film
1991	Young Catherine	Count Mikhail Vorontsov	Michael Anderson	Television miniseries
1991	Julianus barát	Domenico	Gábor Koltay	Television miniseries
1992	Touch and Die	Aquani	Piernico Solinas	Television film
1993	Das Babylon Komplott	Chris Lang	Peter Patzak	Television film
1993	Azzurro profondo	Luca Morinari	Filippo De Luigi	Television film
1994	Nemici intimi	Lorenzo Stradella	Piernico Solinas	Television film
1994	The Dragon Ring	The Dragon King	Lamberto Bava	Television miniseries
1996	The Return of Sandokan	Yogi Azim	Enzo G. Castellari	Television miniseries
1997	David	Nathan	Robert Markowitz	Television film
1997	Desert of Fire	Marcel Duvivier	Enzo G. Castellari	Television miniseries
1997	Painted Lady	Robert Tassi	Julian Jarrold	Television miniseries
1997	Nessuno escluso	Alfonso Martinez	Massimo Spano	Television film
1997	Bella Mafia	Mario Domino	David Greene	Television film
1998	Il tesoro di Damasco	Andrea	José María Sánchez	Television film
2000	Paul the Apostle	Gamaliel	Roger Young	Television miniseries
2001	La voce del sangue	Antonio Castaldi	Alessandro Di Robilant	Television film
2001	The Crusaders	Ibn-Azul	Dominique Othenin-Girard	Television miniseries
2002	Die achte Todsünde: Toskana-Karussell	Giuseppe Mantaldo	Peter Patzak	Television film
2003	The Uncrowned Heart	Bear's Trainer	Peter Patzak	Television film
2003	Liebe, Lügen, Leidenschaften	Pietro Bellini	Marco Serafini	Television miniseries
2003	Cattive inclinazioni	Vagrant	Pierfrancesco Campanella	Television film
2005	Summer Solstice	Lorenzo	Giles Foster	Television film
2006	The Holy Family	Zechariah	Raffaele Mertes	Television film
2007	Der Fürst und das Mädchen	Count Massimo di Romano	Karsten Wichniarz, Axel de Roche	Television series 8 episodes
2007	Two Families	Morandi	Romano Scavolini	Television film
2008	Il sangue e la rosa	Umberto Mancini	Salvatore Samperi, Luciano Odorisio, Luigi Parisi	Episode: "Prima puntata"
2008	Mein Herz in Chile	Carlos Sanchez	Jörg Grünler	Television film
2008	A Night at the Grand Hotel	Ferran Moreno	Thorsten Näter	Television film
2008	Rosamunde Pilcher's Four Seasons	Max Freeman	Giles Foster	Television miniseries
2010	Restless Heart: The Confessions of Saint Augustine	Augustine of Hippo	Christian Duguay	Television miniseries
2011	Law & Order: Special Victims Unit	Roberto Distasio	Michael Slovis	Episode: "Scorched Earth"
2017–18	Delicious	Joe Benelli	John Hardwick, Clare Kilner	Television series 4 episodes
2019	Christmas in Rome	Luigi Forlinghetti	Ernie Barbarash	Hallmark Channel movie
2022	Django	Reverend	Francesca Comencini	Television series

=== Video games ===
Year	Title	Role	Notes
2011	Cars 2: The Video Game	Uncle Topolino	Voice
2025	The Run	Hunter	FMV game

== Discography ==
- 1985 – Will Change The World/Cambierà (Lovers, LVNP 802, 7" – with his son Carlo)
