= Man, Pride and Vengeance =

1968 film

- Italian film poster
- Directed by: Luigi Bazzoni
- Screenplay by: Luigi Bazzoni; Suso Cecchi d'Amico
- Based on: Carmen by Prosper Mérimée
- Produced by: Luigi Rovere
- Starring: Franco Nero; Tina Aumont; Klaus Kinski
- Cinematography: Camillo Bazzoni
- Edited by: Roberto Perpignani
- Music by: Carlo Rustichelli
- Production companies: Regal Film; Fono Roma S.p.A.; Constantin Film; Terra Film
- Distributed by: Rank Film
- Release dates: December 1967; 11 October 1968 (West Germany)
- Running time: 91 minutes
- Countries: Italy; West Germany

Man, Pride and Vengeance (Italian: L'uomo, l'orgoglio, la vendetta; German: Mit Django kam der Tod, lit. 'With Django, Death Came') is a 1967 Spaghetti Western film written and directed by Luigi Bazzoni and starring Franco Nero, Tina Aumont, and Klaus Kinski. It is a Western film adaptation of the novella Carmen by Prosper Mérimée, and is one of the few Westerns not only filmed, but also set in Europe.

== Plot ==
When stalwart Spanish soldier Don José meets the stunningly beautiful Carmen, he becomes instantly obsessed with the mysterious gypsy woman. After discovering she has cheated on him with his Lieutenant, Jose kills the officer during a brawl and flees the city. Forced to become a bandit, Jose partners with Carmen's villainous husband Garcia to rob a stagecoach and prove his love for the seductive femme fatale.

== Cast ==
- Franco Nero as Don José
- Tina Aumont as Carmen
- Klaus Kinsky as Lieutenant Miguel Garcia
- Lee Burton as Tanquiero
- Franco Ressel as Lieutenant Pepe
- Karl Schönböck as English Diplomat
- Alberto Dell'Acqua as Remendado
- Marcella Valeri as Dorotea
- Maria Mizar as Maria
- Mara Carisi as Nina
- José Manuel Martín as Juan
- Hans Albrecht as Miguel

== Release ==
Man, Pride and Vengeance was released in December 1967. It was released in West Germany on 11 October 1968.
