= Longtake =

- Directed by: Louis Nero
- Written by: Louis Nero
- Produced by: Louis Nero
- Starring: Daniele Savoca, Simona Nasi, Giorgia Cardaci
- Cinematography: Louis Nero
- Edited by: Louis Nero
- Music by: Tiziano Lamberti
- Release date: 2005
- Running time: 123 minutes
- Country: Italy
- Language: Italian

Longtake (Italian title: Pianosequenza) is a 2005 Italian film directed by Louis Nero.

== Cast ==
- Daniele Savoca: Paolo
- Simona Nasi: Petra
- Giorgia Cardaci: Wife
- Pietro Di Legami: Gianni
- Aldo Rendina: Sandro
- Flavio Sciolè: Marco
- Lola Gonzales: Michela
- Tiziana Catalano: Mother
