= Milarepa (2025 film) =

- Directed by: Louis Nero
- Written by: Louis Nero
- Produced by: Louis Nero, Jake Seal
- Starring: F. Murray Abraham; Harvey Keitel
- Cinematography: Micaela Cauterucci
- Edited by: Eric Potter
- Music by: Andrea Guerra
- Production companies: L'Altrofilm, Orwo Studios, Black Hangar Studios
- Release date: 2025
- Running time: 110 min
- Countries: Italy; United States
- Language: English

Milarepa is a 2025 English-language Italian independent film written and directed by Louis Nero.

== Plot ==
In the Mediterranean, Mila's father is murdered by her aunt, Khulan. Seeking revenge, Mila travels far away to learn magic, and disguises as a boy to do so.

== Cast ==
- F. Murray Abraham
- Harvey Keitel as Marpa
- Franco Nero
- Ángela Molina
- Isabelle Allen as Mila
- Kaitlyn Kemp
- Iazua Larios
- Michael Ronda
- Bruno Bilotta
- Hal Yamanouchi
- Diana Dell'Erba
- Sebastiano Farci
- Andrea Mameli
- Matilde Cusenza
- Alioune Badiane
- Luca Mameli
- Beatrice Cusseddu

== Production ==
The film is inspired by Milarepa, a Buddhist saint.

== Release ==
The film was shown at the Boston International Film Festival.
