= The Man Who Drew God =

- Italian: L'uomo che disegnò Dio
- Directed by: Franco Nero
- Screenplay by: Eugenio Masciari; Franco Nero; Lorenzo De Luca
- Story by: Eugenio Masciari
- Produced by: Louis Nero; Michael Tadross Jr.; Bernard Salzman; Alexander Nistratov
- Starring: Franco Nero; Kevin Spacey; Faye Dunaway; Robert Davi; Stefania Rocca
- Cinematography: Gerardo Fornari
- Music by: Giuliano Taviani
- Production companies: L'Altrofilm; Tadross Media Group; BuldDog Brothers
- Distributed by: L'Altrofilm
- Release dates: 21 November 2022 (Russia); 5 December 2022 (Turin); 2 March 2023 (Italy)
- Running time: 110 minutes
- Countries: Italy; United States; Russia
- Languages: Italian; English

The Man Who Drew God (Italian: L'uomo che disegnò Dio) is a 2022 drama film directed by Franco Nero and starring Nero, Kevin Spacey, and Faye Dunaway. It marks Spacey's first role after sexual misconduct allegations against him surfaced in 2017. Based on a true story, the film depicts a blind man who could draw portraits of people by hearing their voice in 1950s Italy. Nero portrays the blind artist, Spacey a police detective, and Dunaway a braille teacher who is an old friend of the artist.

The film was released in Russia on video on demand on 21 November 2022. It had its Italian premiere at a screening in Turin in conjunction with the Torino Film Festival on 5 December 2022. It was released in Italy on 2 March 2023.

== Cast ==
- Franco Nero as Emanuele
- Kevin Spacey (dubbed by Roberto Pedicini) as the police detective
- Faye Dunaway (dubbed by Angiola Baggi) as Tasha
- Robert Davi (dubbed by Michele Gammino) as the lawyer Fauci
- Stefania Rocca as Pola
- Massimo Ranieri as Bettler
- Alessia Alciati as Alessia
- Diana Dell'Erba as Fiamma
- Kathleen Hagen (dubbed by Beatrice Margiotti) as Lina Forzosi
- Simona Nasi as Desirè
- Emanuela Petroni as Shannon Lear
- Isabel Ciammaglichella (dubbed by Chiara Fabiano) as Iaia
- Sofia Nistratova (dubbed by Anita Sala) as Matilda
- Fernanda Maffé (dubbed by Beatrice Margiotti) as Ninetta
- Gabriele Barbone (dubbed by Diego Follega) as Emanuele as a child
- Andrea Cocco (dubbed by Marco Vivio) as Livio
- Vittorio Boscolo (dubbed by Francesco Bulckaen) as the producer
- Sophie D'Ambra (dubbed by Simona D'Angelo) as the colf
- Marco Deambrogio (dubbed by Alberto Bognanni) as the oculist

== Production ==
On 23 May 2021, ABC News reported that Spacey and Vanessa Redgrave, Nero's wife, would star in the film and that it would soon be shot in Italy. On casting Spacey, Nero told the outlet, "I'm very happy Kevin agreed to participate in my film. I consider him a great actor and I can't wait to start the movie." Later that day, producer Louis Nero told Variety that Spacey and Redgrave's roles are small, while the main character is played by Franco Nero, and that Redgrave's appearance was not finalised but would depend on whether she could travel from England to Italy. On 26 May, Redgrave announced that she had turned down the role. On 7 July 2021, Variety reported that Redgrave had been replaced by Dunaway and that the film was being sold at the Cannes Marché du Film. It quoted Louis Nero as saying, "We have plenty of interest from buyers around the world. All the controversy around the film has generated plenty of interest ... It was good for the film, from my point of view." It was reported that the film involves the protagonist wrongly accused of sexually abusing a child, but Louis Nero told Entertainment Weekly that the film "does not involve pedophilia". However, according to Il Messaggero, which interviewed Spacey, Spacey portrays "a commissioner who arrests an alleged molester and then releases him because he is innocent".

Filming took place from 28 May to 3 July 2021 in Turin. According to Louis Nero, the film was inspired by the true story of a teacher at the Academy of Fine Arts in Turin in the 1970s who made clay portraits even after becoming blind because of melanoma.
