= Brothers Blue =

1973 film by Luigi Bazzoni

- International film poster
- Directed by: Marc Meyer
- Screenplay by: Augusto Caminito; Mario Fanelli
- Story by: Augusto Caminito
- Produced by: Franco Rossellini
- Starring: Jack Palance; Guido Mannari; Tina Aumont; Antonio Falsi; Maurizio Bonuglia
- Cinematography: Vittorio Storaro
- Edited by: Roberto Perpignani
- Music by: Tony Renis
- Production companies: Felix Cinematografica; P.E.C.F.
- Distributed by: Dear Film
- Release date: 1973
- Running time: 95 minutes
- Countries: Italy; France

Brothers Blue (Italian: Blu Gang - E vissero per sempre felici e ammazzati) is a 1973 Italian Spaghetti Western film directed by Luigi Bazzoni. For this film Tony Renis won the Nastro d'Argento for Best Score.

== Plot ==
The Blue brothers (Kane, Johnny and Frank) try to lead a free and independent life by robbing banks. They are pursued by a local sheriff Hillmann, who tries in vain to capture them. When the brothers finally get enough money, their life turns up into bright and rather dangerous adventure.

== Cast ==
- Guido Mannari as Johnny Blue
- Tina Aumont as Polly Clay
- Jack Palance as Captain Hillman
- Antonio Falsi as Kane Blue
- Maurizio Bonuglia as Frank Blue
- Paul Jabara as Teddy Fog
- Guido Lollobrigida as Sheriff (as Lee Burton)
- Maria Michi as Mutter Blue
