= Suicide Commandos (film) =

- Spanish film poster
- Directed by: Camillo Bazzoni
- Screenplay by: Mino Guerrini; Gene Luotto
- Based on: Commando 44 by Piet Legay (novel)
- Produced by: Piero Donati
- Starring: Aldo Ray; Luis Dávila; Pamela Tudor
- Cinematography: Francisco Sánchez
- Edited by: Ornella Micheli
- Music by: Daisy Lumini
- Production companies: Cine RED (ITA); Estela Films (SPA)
- Distributed by: Commonwealth United Entertainment (USA)
- Release date: October 10, 1968 (Italy)
- Running time: 98 min
- Countries: Italy; Spain

Suicide Commandos (Italian: Commando suicida) is a 1968 Italian war film starring Aldo Ray. It was directed by Camillo Bazzoni and based on the 1966 novel Commando 44 by Piet Delay.

== Cast ==
- Aldo Ray as Sergeant Cloadec
- Tano Cimarosa as Calleya
- Ugo Fangareggi as Harper (as Hugh Fangar-Smith)
- Luis Dávila as Sam
- Manuel Zarzo as Sorrel
- Pamela Tudor as Calleya's Wife
- Vira Silenti as Frau Vonberg
- Frank Braña as Ortulay
