= Guido Lollobrigida =

Italian actor and race car driver (1928–2013)

- Lollobrigida in Man, Pride and Vengeance (1967)
- Born: 4 September 1928; Rome, Lazio, Kingdom of Italy
- Died: 21 January 2014 (aged 85); Rome, Lazio, Italy
- Other names: Lee Barton; Lee Burton
- Occupations: Actor; race car driver
- Relatives: Gina Lollobrigida (cousin); Francesca Lollobrigida (distant cousin); Francesco Lollobrigida (distant cousin)

Guido Lollobrigida (4 September 1928 – 21 January 2014) was an Italian actor and race car driver, usually credited in movies as Lee Barton or Lee Burton. He was a cousin of actress Gina Lollobrigida.

== Life and career ==
Born in Rome, after graduating as a technical engineer Lollobrigida moved to South America, where in 1957 he made his acting debut in a film which was never distributed.

Returned to Italy in the mid-1960s, he immediately started a prolific career in genre films, mainly Spaghetti Westerns and adventure films, sometimes cast in leading roles. Starting from the second half of the 1970s, he significantly slowed his activities.

== Selected filmography ==
- 100.000 dollari per Ringo (1965) - Luke Sherry
- The Spy with Ten Faces (1966) - Santos
- Kill Johnny Ringo (1966) - Sheriff Parker / Lee Mellin
- Django Shoots First (1966) - Ward
- Two Sons of Ringo (1966) - Fred, Saloon Owner
- Mexican Slayride (1967) - Montez
- The Cobra (1967) - Killer
- O.K. Connery (1967) - Kurt
- Your Turn to Die (1967)
- Man, Pride and Vengeance (1967) - Tanquiero / Lopez - Smuggler's Leader
- Vengeance (1968)
- Django, Prepare a Coffin (1968) - Jonathan Abbott
- A Long Ride from Hell (1968) - Deputy Sheriff Harry
- Giugno '44 - Sbarcheremo in Normandia (1968) - Alan
- Bandits in Rome (1968) - Angelo Scotese
- Cemetery Without Crosses (1969) - Thomas Caine
- Bloody Che Contra (1969) - Vicente
- Battle of the Commandos (1969) - Pvt. Tom Carlyle
- And God Said to Cain (1970) - Miguel Santamaria
- Mafia Connection (1970) - Michele
- Roy Colt and Winchester Jack (1970) - Winchester's lead henchman
- Rough Justice (1970) - Bowen - the Saloon Owner
- Mio padre monsignore (1971) - Odeschi
- Terrible Day of the Big Gundown (1971) - Sheriff Jed
- Drummer of Vengeance (1971) - Steve
- Red Sun (1971) - Mace
- African Story (1971) - Zack
- Brother Sun, Sister Moon (1972)
- Crime Boss (1972) - Peppino Lo Surdo
- Gang War in Naples (1972) - Mobster (uncredited)
- Rugantino (1973)
- Those Dirty Dogs (1973) - Corporal
- Brothers Blue (1973) - Sheriff
- Number One (1973)
- The Pumaman (1980) - Kobras Thug with Moustache
- Tom Horn (1980) - Cowboy
