= Francesco Cabras =

Italian actor and film director

Francesco Cabras (born 27 May 1966, in Rome) is an Italian actor and film director. He played the role of Gesmas on Mel Gibson's The Passion of the Christ, the chief of the rebels in Kurt Wimmer's Equilibrium, and Grigori Rasputin in Louis Nero's 2011 film Rasputin.

He is currently working as a director, writer, cinematographer, cameraman and producer. His acting debut won him the 1996 Nanni Moretti's Sacher Festival Award for best leading actor.

He directed, together with Alberto Molinari, The Big Question, a feature documentary selected at AFI Festival in Los Angeles about the faith and the perception of the divine distributed by ThinkFilm. The film was originally produced by Mel Gibson.
