= George Eastman Award =

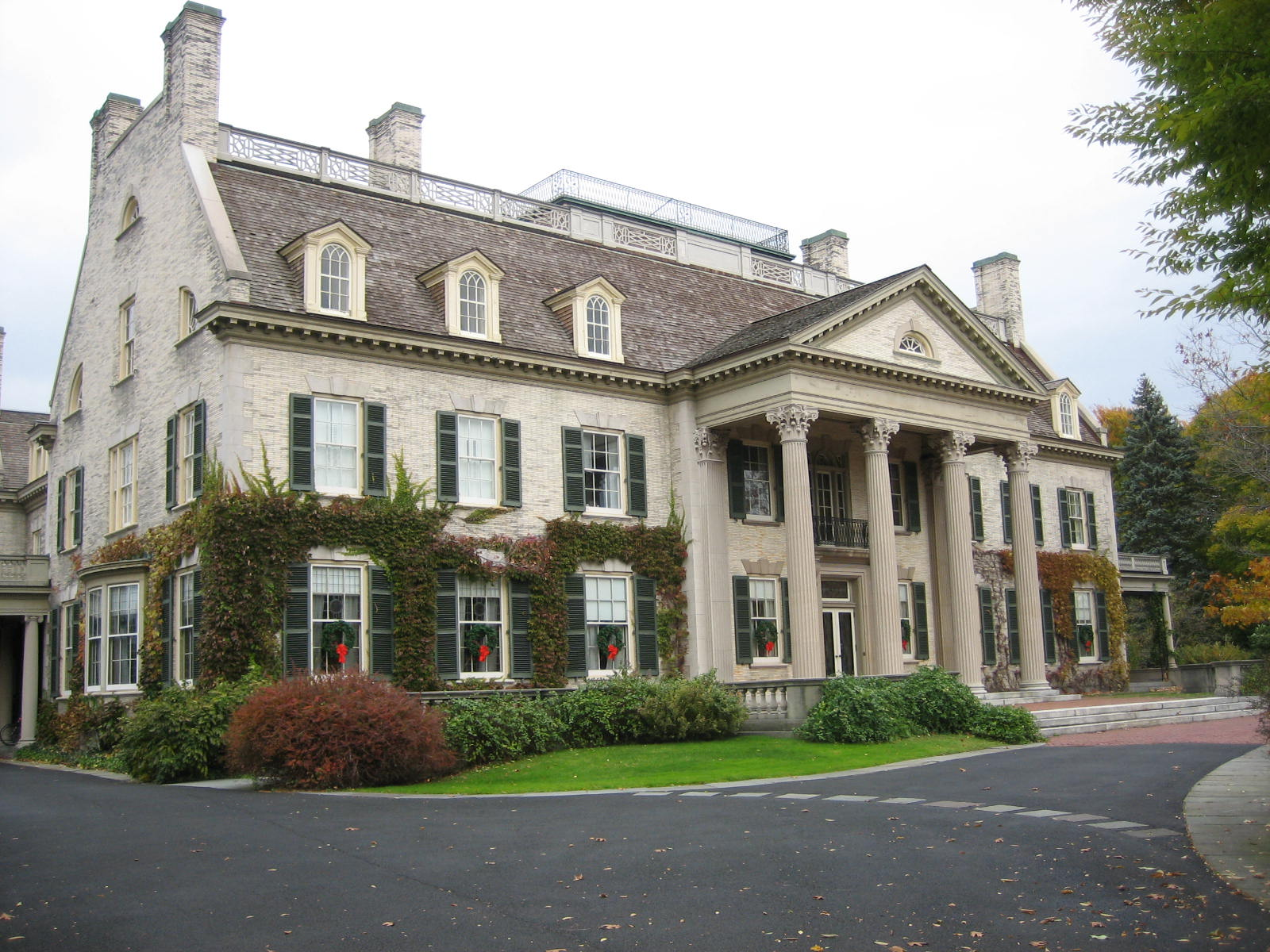
Manor house and George Eastman Museum

The George Eastman Award for distinguished contribution to the art of film was established by the George Eastman Museum in 1955 as the first film award given by an American archive and museum to honor artistic work of enduring value.

The award was first presented in 1955 to actors, actresses, directors, and cinematographers from the early years of silent film (1915–1925), and in 1957 to artists from the final years of the silent film era (1926–1930). The early recipients included Charles Chaplin, Mary Pickford, Joan Crawford, Frank Capra, and Gary Cooper.

The George Eastman Award later evolved to recognize a broader range of artistic talent in the film industry, from George Cukor and Fred Astaire to Martin Scorsese and Jodie Foster. The award ceremony was originally held at Eastman Theatre in Rochester and now takes place in the Eastman Museum's Dryden Theatre.

== Award recipients ==
=== Actors/Actresses ===
- Fred Astaire
- Lauren Bacall
- Richard Barthelmess
- Joan Bennett
- Clara Bow
- Louise Brooks
- Charles Chaplin
- Maurice Chevalier
- Ronald Colman
- Gary Cooper
- Joan Crawford
- Dolores del Río
- Michael Douglas
- Jodie Foster
- Greta Garbo
- Janet Gaynor
- Richard Gere
- Lillian Gish
- Audrey Hepburn
- Goldie Hawn
- Buster Keaton
- Michael Keaton
- Harold Lloyd
- Myrna Loy
- Fredric March
- Mae Marsh
- Rita Moreno
- Kim Novak
- Ramon Novarro
- Maureen O'Sullivan
- Gregory Peck
- Mary Pickford
- William Powell
- Luise Rainer
- Julia Roberts
- Isabella Rossellini
- Norma Shearer
- Sylvia Sidney
- Octavia Spencer
- Meryl Streep
- James Stewart
- Gloria Swanson
- Blanche Sweet
- Norma Talmadge
- Johnny Weissmuller

=== Directors ===
- Frank Borzage
- Clarence Brown
- Frank Capra
- Roger Corman
- George Cukor
- Cecil B. DeMille
- John Ford
- Henry King
- Frank Lloyd
- Marshall Neilan
- Willard Van Dyke
- King Vidor
- Martin Scorsese
- Josef von Sternberg

=== Cinematographers ===
- William Daniels
- Arthur Edeson
- George J. Folsey
- Lee Garmes
- James Wong Howe
- Peverell Marley
- Hal Mohr
- Charles Rosher
- Hal Rosson
- John Seitz
- Vittorio Storaro
- Karl Struss
