= Alberto Molinari =

Filmmaker and actor (born 1956)

Alberto Molinari (born Rome, 14 April 1965) is an Italian actor, producer, and director, mainly of documentary films. He made his debut in the 1988 film Un bel dì vedremo.

== Filmography ==
=== As actor ===
==== Films ====
- Il cuore di mamma, directed by Gioia Benelli (1988)
- Un bel di' vedremo, directed by Vito Zagarrio (1988)
- Non è romantico?, directed by Giovanna Sonnino (1991)
- Volevamo essere gli U2, directed by Andrea Barzini (1992)
- Ritorno a Parigi, directed by Maurizio Rasio (1994)
- Cuore cattivo, directed by Umberto Marino (1995)
- Cronaca di un amore violato, directed by Giacomo Battiato (1996)
- Con rabbia e con amore, directed by Alfredo Angeli (1997)
- Il bagno turco, directed by Ferzan Ozpetek (1997)
- Simpatici & antipatici, directed by Christian De Sica (1998)
- L'appuntamento, directed by Veronica Bilbao La Vieja (2001)
- La verità vi prego sull'amore, directed by Francesco Apolloni (2001)

==== Television ====
- Una lepre con la faccia da bambina, directed by Gianni Serra (1988)
- Stelle in fiamme, directed by Italo Moscati (1990)
- Olocausto privato, directed by Franca Alessio (1991)
- Piccole speranze, directed by Paolo Poeti (1992)
- Uno di noi, directed by Fabrizio Costa (1996)
- Solo x te, directed by Maria Carmela Cicinnati and Peter Exacoustos (1998)
- Nanà, directed by Alberto Negrin (1999)
- Meglio tardi che mai, directed by Luca Manfredi (1999)
- Don Matteo – episode Delitto accademico, directed by Enrico Oldoini (2000)
- L'impero, directed by Lamberto Bava (2000)
- Turbo, directed by Antonio Bonifacio (2000)
- Il bello delle donne (2001–2003)
- Il maresciallo Rocca 3, directed by Giorgio Capitani e Josè Maria Sanchez (2001)
- Maria José - L'ultima regina, directed by Carlo Lizzani (2002)
- Un posto tranquillo, directed by Luca Manfredi (2003)
- Un papà quasi perfetto, directed by Maurizio Dell'Orso (2003)
- Con le unghie e con i denti, directed by Pier Francesco Pingitore (2004)
- Part time, directed by Angelo Longoni (2004)
- Amiche, directed by Paolo Poeti (2004)
- L'uomo sbagliato, directed by Stefano Reali (2005)
- I colori della vita, directed by Stefano Reali (2005)
- La signora delle camelie, directed by Lodovico Gasparini (2005)
- L'uomo che sognava con le aquile, directed by Vittorio Sindoni (2006)
- Di che peccato sei?, directed by Pier Francesco Pingitore (2007)
- Donne sbagliate, directed by Monica Vullo (2007)
- Provaci ancora prof – episode Dietro la porta, directed by Rossella Izzo (2007)
- Senza via d'uscita - Un amore spezzato, directed by Giorgio Serafini (2007)
- Io ti assolvo, directed by Monica Vullo (2008)
- Zodiaco, directed by Eros Puglielli (2008)
- Il sangue e la rosa – second series (2008)
- Bakhita, directed by Giacomo Campiotti (2009)
- So che ritornerai, directed by Eros Puglielli (2009)
- Io e mio figlio - Nuove storie per il commissario Vivaldi, directed by Luciano Odorisio (2010)
- Paura di amare, directed by Vincenzo Terracciano (2010)
- Viso d'angelo, directed by Eros Puglielli (2011)

=== As producer ===
==== Film ====
- Santarcangelo dei Teatri, directed by Francesco Cabras and Alberto Molinari (1999)
- Her Bijit, directed by Francesco Cabras and Alberto Molinari (1999)
- Punti di vista: Le dame veneziane, Augusto Gentili, directed by Francesco Cabras and Alberto Molinari (1999)
- Punti di vista: L'Arsenale di Venezia con Massimo Barbero, directed by Francesco Cabras and Alberto Molinari (1999)
- Tinte forti, directed by Francesco Cabras (2000)
- Italian Soldiers, directed by Francesco Cabras (2001)
- The Big Question, directed by Francesco Cabras and Alberto Molinari (2004)
- L'aria, directed by Daniele Prato (2005)
- Su mandala, directed by Francesco Cabras and Alberto Molinari (2006)
- The Age of Aquarium, directed by Francesco Cabras (2006)
- Pale eoliche, directed by Francesco Cabras (2007)

==== Television ====
- Josef Koudelka, directed by Francesco Cabras and Alberto Molinari (1999)
- Corpi, il '900 scolpito, directed by Francesco Cabras and Alberto Molinari (2000)
- Il compromesso - La tomba di Giulio II e la tragedia di Michelangelo, directed by Francesco Cabras and Alberto Molinari (2000)
- L'arsenale di Pippo, directed by Francesco Cabras and Alberto Molinari (2004)
- Intervallo. Trinità d'Agultu-Luras, directed by Francesco Cabras and Alberto Molinari (2006)

=== As director ===
==== Film ====
- Santarcangelo dei Teatri, directed by Francesco Cabras and Alberto Molinari (1999)
- Her Bijit, directed by Francesco Cabras and Alberto Molinari (1999)
- Punti di vista: Le dame veneziane, Augusto Gentili, directed by Francesco Cabras and Alberto Molinari (1999)
- Punti di vista: L'Arsenale di Venezia con Massimo Barbero, directed by Francesco Cabras and Alberto Molinari (1999)
- Una grande fortuna, directed by Francesco Cabras and Alberto Molinari (2002)
- The Big Question, directed by Francesco Cabras and Alberto Molinari (2004)
- Su mandala, directed by Francesco Cabras and Alberto Molinari (2006)

==== Television ====
- Josef Koudelka, directed by Francesco Cabras and Alberto Molinari (1999)
- La montagna cava, directed by Francesco Cabras and Alberto Molinari (2000)
- Corpi, il '900 scolpito, directed by Francesco Cabras and Alberto Molinari (2000)
- Il compromesso - La tomba di Giulio II e la tragedia di Michelangelo, directed by Francesco Cabras and Alberto Molinari (2000)
- L'arsenale di Pippo, directed by Francesco Cabras and Alberto Molinari (2004)
- Intervallo. Trinità d'Agultu-Luras, directed by Francesco Cabras and Alberto Molinari (2006)
