= Nico Naldini =

Italian novelist (1929–2020)

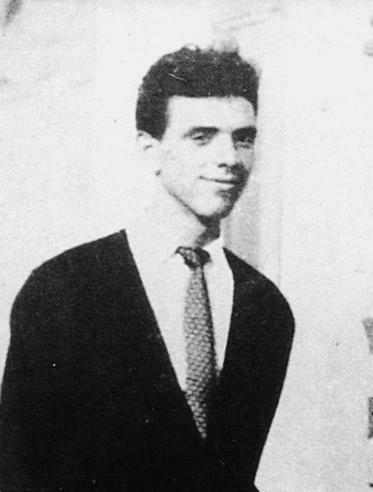
Naldini in 1945

Domenico Naldini (1 March 1929 – 9 September 2020) was an Italian novelist, poet and film director. Some of his work has been translated into English.

Naldini was born in Casarsa della Delizia, Pordenone to Antonio Naldini and Enrichetta Colussi. His mother was the sister of Susanna Colussi, the mother of Pier Paolo Pasolini, making him his first cousin. He was his cousin's biographer. He was a lecturer and professor at the University of Trento and professor of Italian literature at the University of Tunis. His work includes popularizing Italian literature and culture throughout the world.

Naldini died in Treviso on 9 September 2020, at the age of 91.
