= Footprints on the Moon (1975 film) =

1975 Italian mystery thriller film

- Film poster
- Directed by: Luigi Bazzoni
- Screenplay by: Luigi Bazzoni
- Based on: Las Huellas by Mario Fenelli
- Produced by: Luciano Perugia; Marina Cicogna
- Starring: Florinda Bolkan; Peter McEnery; Klaus Kinski; Lila Kedrova; Nicoletta Elmi
- Cinematography: Vittorio Storaro
- Edited by: Roberto Perpignani
- Music by: Nicola Piovani
- Production company: Cinemarte S.r.l.
- Distributed by: Cineriz
- Release date: 1 February 1975 (Italy)
- Running time: 96 minutes
- Country: Italy
- Box office: ₤202.505 million

Footprints on the Moon (Italian: Le orme, lit. 'The Footprints', also released as Primal Impulse) is a 1975 Italian giallo film written and directed by Luigi Bazzoni, and starring Florinda Bolkan, Peter McEnery, Lila Kedrova, Nicoletta Elmi, and Klaus Kinski. It concerns Alice (Bolkan), a translator with an unexplained two-day gap in her memory who follows clues to a mysterious seaside town for answers, where the unfamiliar residents seem to recognize her as a different woman named Nicole.

== Plot ==
The film opens with a stylized scene of a spacecraft landing on the moon. Under the orders of an evil flight controller named Blackmann, an unconscious astronaut is dragged out and left on the surface. The astronaut comes to and watches in terror as the craft lifts off, leaving him stranded.

Alice Cespi, a translator working for the Italian government, awakens to the phone ringing in her Rome apartment on what she believes is a Tuesday morning. The call is from her friend Mary, asking to be picked up from the airport. Mary says she tried to call her several times the previous day, but did not receive an answer. In the car, before dropping Mary off on the way to work, Alice reveals she has been having nightmares about a movie she saw many years ago called Footprints on the Moon where an astronaut was abandoned during a lunar mission (the clip shown at the beginning of the film).

She arrives at the government offices but is reprimanded for failing to report to work for the past two days. Alice discovers that it is actually Thursday, not Tuesday. She remembers feeling paranoid while translating a live speech Monday afternoon that everyone in the room was watching her, causing her to flee the building in a panic. Her memory stops there, leaving a two-day gap. Returning to her apartment, she notices several strange things, including a bloodstained dress in her closet she doesn't recall buying, a torn postcard from a hotel on a Turkish island town, and a single earring missing its partner. Distressed by memories of Footprints on the Moon and visions of a distinctive stained-glass window featuring peacocks, she heads to Turkey for answers.

Arriving in Turkey, Alice accepts a ride to her hotel from Henry, a friendly man with a bandaged hand. She thinks she recognizes him from somewhere but can't place him. At the hotel, she meets a young girl vacationing with her family, Paula Burton. Paula initially mistakes her for a different woman who was on the island earlier that week, Nicole. Paula tells Alice that Nicole was rude to the other hotel guests, acted erratically, and lit fires in the woods near the beach before disappearing. That night, she has nightmares of the film again.

The next day on the beach, she meets a fellow tourist, Mrs. Heim, who remarks on her likeness to Nicole, minus the latter's distinctive long red hair. Alice follows Paula into the woods, interrogating her for more information about Nicole. Paula initially reveals she appeared afraid someone was following her but is scared by Alice's frantic questioning and flees. Deeper in the trees, Alice finds burned clothes, scattered government papers, and a stray dog playing with a long red wig. Back on the beach, she runs into Henry and the two begin talking. During their conversation, he makes several remarks which seem to hint he knows more about her than he is letting on. They agree to meet for a drink that afternoon.

Alice heads into town, where a hairdresser, a store clerk, and other proprietors testify to doing business with someone matching her description earlier that week under the name Nicole. In a boutique window, she notices a dress identical to the bloodstained one in her closet. After several proprietors make reference to a specific order Nicole placed at a general store, Alice goes there and asks to buy the same item, which is revealed to be a pair of scissors. She puts them in her purse. At drinks with Henry, they discuss her nightmares of the film and the unusual behavior of the locals. The conversation takes an odd turn when he insists she has something to tell him and implores her to do so. Disturbed by his strange actions, Alice breaks off the meeting.

At the hotel, she attempts to check out and leave Garma but discovers her wallet is missing; a note left by Mrs. Heim reveals she found it. Meeting Alice at a local orchestra performance to return it, the older woman tells her she must accept the fact she has been to the island before. The delay causes her to miss the last boat of the evening. Now convinced she spent the two missing days in Garma but unsure why, she has a mental breakdown fueled by visions of the film and runs into the woods, where she faints.

Alice awakens at a seaside mansion, in a room with the distinctive peacock window. In the adjoining bathroom, she finds her missing earring and is surprised by Henry, who says he found her in the forest and took her back to his home in hopes of jogging her memory. He then reveals they briefly met as teenagers, when Alice was visiting Garma with her family on a day trip, and they spent a single afternoon together at the mansion. Henry theorizes the stress of her job as well as the increasing nightmares of the film caused her to have a brief dissociative episode during which she assumed a new identity of "Nicole", was convinced the characters from Footprints on the Moon were after her, and returned to a place that held a happy memory, Garma, where he encountered her on Tuesday. Recognizing the symptoms of a breakdown, he tried to get her treatment, but she reacted violently and slashed his hand with the scissors (thus his bandages and the bloodstained dress) before escaping. When she returned to the island on Thursday as Alice, he attempted to get her to remember the week's events naturally, fearing that by telling her outright she would again react violently.

Henry lays her on a couch before going to call a psychiatric ward. Alice sneaks downstairs and eavesdrops, convinced he is contacting Blackmann. When he returns to the room, she accuses him of working with the scientists from Footprints on the Moon to capture her. Despite his insistence that the film is fictional and he is trying to get her help, she fatally stabs him with the scissors in her purse and runs out of the mansion. Two nurses from the ward arrive. Alice hallucinates they are astronauts from Blackmann's program and flees down the beach, but they catch up and drag her away, screaming. A title card states she is currently being held in a secure hospital.

== Cast ==
- Florinda Bolkan as Alice Campos ('Alice Cespi' in the English version)
- Peter McEnery as Henry
- Lila Kedrova as Iris Ines ('Mrs. Heim')
- Nicoletta Elmi as Paola Bersel ('Paula Burton')
- Klaus Kinski as Professor Blackmann
- Ida Galli as Mary
- Caterina Boratto as Boutique Owner
- John Karlsen as Alfredo Laurenti ('Alfred Lowenthal')
- Rosita Torosh as Marie Leblanche
- Feridun Çölgeçen as Hotel Concierge
- Esmeralda Ruspoli

== Production ==
The film's script was based on Las Huellas by Italian-Argentinian writer Mario Fenelli. He was close friends with Manuel Puig, the two of them writing scripts together while Puig encouraged Fenelli to become a fiction writer instead of a filmmaker. The film was shot in nine weeks between Rome and Kemer, Turkey starting on 29 April 1974. Several scenes were shot at the Phaselis ruins.

Florinda Bolkan spoke on her performance in the film, stating that she was immersed into it psychologically and physically and claiming she lost eleven pounds while working on it. Footprints was director Luigi Bazzoni's final feature film.

== Release ==
Footprints on the Moon was distributed by Cineriz in Italy as Le orme on 1 February 1975. The film grossed a total of 202,505,676 Italian lire domestically.

== Reception ==
On its initial release, critic Giovanni Grazzini wrote that "following Dario Argento's exploits, Italian cinema can count on another director who knows how to make a thriller...The movie nails you to the chair, keeps you awake, sows in doubt and curiosity, and eventually does not make you regret the time and money spent."

Francesco Barilli saw the film in 2011 and referred to it as an "intriguing, elegant, suggestive film, very courageous and peculiar, very well shot and [with] beautiful photography by Vittorio Storaro".
