= Daniele Prato =

Italian footballer (born 1991)

Personal information
- Date of birth: 25 May 1991 (age 35)
- Place of birth: Segrate, Italy
- Height: 1.75 m (5 ft 9 in)
- Position: Midfielder

Team information
- Current team: Monza

Youth career
- 2007–2009: Monza

Senior career*
| Years | Team | Apps | (Gls) |
| 2009– | Monza | 35 | (1) |
- * Club domestic league appearances and goals as of 30 january 2012

Daniele Prato (born 25 May 1991) is an Italian footballer who plays for Prima Divisione club Monza.

== Career ==
In 2009, Prato debut in Monza first team at the age of 18 years, and became the mainstay of the midfield of Biancorossi. At the end of the Season 2010/11, Prato suffer "a sort of excrescence" that bothers him in the kneecap. The problem is that the phenomenon may also extend to risk another knee. It 'a nuisance, unfortunately, not often, but that can affect athletes at a young age.
