= Luigi Bazzoni =

Italian film director and screenwriter (1929–2012)

- Born: 25 June 1929; Salsomaggiore Terme, Emilia-Romagna, Italy
- Died: 1 March 2012 (aged 82); Salsomaggiore Terme, Emilia-Romagna, Italy
- Occupations: Film director; screenwriter
- Notable work: The Possessed; The Fifth Cord; Footprints on the Moon
- Relatives: Camillo Bazzoni (brother); Vittorio Storaro (cousin)

Luigi Bazzoni (25 June 1929 - 1 March 2012) was an Italian film director and screenwriter. He is known internationally to horror film fans for directing three well-regarded gialli: The Possessed (1965), The Fifth Cord (1971) and Footprints on the Moon (1975). He was also the cousin of noted cinematographer of Vittorio Storaro, and was one of his earliest notable collaborators.

== Early life ==
Bazzoni was born in Salsomaggiore Terme in June 1929. He was the elder brother to film director and cinematographer Camillo Bazzoni, and a cousin of the Academy Award-winning cinematographer Vittorio Storaro.

He began his filmmaking career as an assistant director to Mauro Bolognini on several films between 1960 and 1964.

== Career ==
Bazzoni directed several short films, and his debut Di Domenica received a Special Mention at the 1963 Cannes Film Festival. His feature film debut was the 1965 psychological thriller The Possessed, which earned high critical marks. He gained further attention for two offbeat Spaghetti Westerns, Man, Pride and Vengeance (1968) with Franco Nero and Klaus Kinski, and Brothers Blue (1973) with Jack Palance.

Bazzoni subsequently directed two well-regarded gialli, The Fifth Cord (1971) and Footprints on the Moon (1975). The former was praised by critic Marina Antunes as an "entertaining, occasionally awe-inspiring package that stands the test of time as a fine example of the giallo genre." Both films are also noted for the cinematography by Bazzoni’s cousin Vittorio Storaro.

Though both were commercially successful, Bazzoni never directed another feature film, and subsequently focused on documentaries. He contributed to the multi-part series Roma Imago Urbis. His final film credit was as a screenwriter on the 2005 crime drama Raul: Straight to Kill.

== Death ==
Bazzoni died on March 1, 2012 at the age of 82, in his hometown of Salsomaggiore Terme.

== Filmography ==
=== Feature films ===
Year	Title	Director	Writer	Notes
1965	The Possessed	Yes	Yes	Co-director with Franco Rossellini
1968	Man, Pride and Vengeance	Yes	Yes	
1971	The Fifth Cord	Yes	Yes	
1973	Brothers Blue	Yes	Yes	
1975	Footprints on the Moon	Yes	Yes	
2005	Raul: Straight to Kill	No	Yes	

=== Short films ===
Year	Title	Director	Writer	Notes
1963	Di domenica	Yes	No	
1963	Un delitto	Yes	No	
1966	Sortilegio	Yes	No	
1966	Sirtaki	Yes	No	

=== Television ===
Year	Title	Director	Writer	Notes
1994-95	Roma Imago Urbis: Parte I - Il mito	Yes	No	6-part documentary series
