= Louis Nero =

Italian film director and screenwriter (born 1976)

- Born: Luigi Biancone; 24 September 1976 (age 50); Turin, Italy
- Occupations: Film director, screenwriter, cinematographer, editor
- Years active: 1998–present

Luigi Biancone (born 24 September 1976), known by the stage name Louis Nero, is an Italian filmmaker.

== Life and career ==
Nero took a degree in DAMS University of Turin in 1999. Nowadays is attending the second degree in theoretical philosophy. He is the President since 1998 of L'Altrofilm. Since 2004 he is a permanent member of David of Donatello jury (Italian Academy Awards). In the 2022 he is a permanent member of jury EFA (European Film Academy). His first film Golem participated at David of Donatello and it was nominated for the Golden Ciak as Best First Work. Since today he has realized, produced four long take, regularly screened in theatres, home-video and television. In 2005 realized and shot Pianosequenza, a film completely shot in long-take in which people meets other people just for an instant with a strong impact on their destiny and Hans with Daniele Savoca, Franco Nero and Silvano Agosti.

In The Rage, shot at the end of 2007, he directs many big actors among the Academy Awards Faye Dunaway, Franco Nero, Tinto Brass, Corin Redgrave. The music was composed by the Academy Awards Luis Bacalov and Teho Teardo. It was candidate at David of Donatello. In 2011 shot Rasputin, about the most famous occultist of Russia and in 2014 The Mystery of Dante with the Academy Awards F. Murray Abraham. His last film is about The Broken Key is with many international actor like: Rutger Hauer, Christopher Lambert, Geraldine Chaplin, Michael Madsen. In 2021 he produced The Man Who Drew God by Franco Nero with Kevin Spacey and Faye Dunaway. In 2024 he directed and produced the film Milarepa with Harvey Keitel, F. Murray Abraham and Isabelle Allen. A biopic about Milarepa, who inspired the character of Gautama Buddha, known as Siddhartha. His films have been screened in the most important international festival. Milarepa won Best Film and Best Director at the 2026 Boston International Film Festival.

== Filmography ==
=== Director and screenwriter ===
- Golem (2003)
- Longtake (2005)
- Hans (2006)
- La rabbia (2008)
- Rasputin (2011)
- The Mystery of Dante (2014)
- The Broken Key (2017)
- Milarepa (2024)

==== Shorts ====
- Cube (1998)
- Lullaby (2009)
- Soledad (2012)
- Mechanismo (2018)

==== Movies ====
- Golem (2003)
- Longtake (2005)
- Hans (2006)
- La rabbia (2008)
- Rasputin (2011)
- The Mystery of Dante (2014)
- The Broken Key (2017)
