= Rachid Benhadj =

Algerian film director and screenwriter

- Born: 12 July 1949 (age 75); Algiers, Algeria
- Occupation: film director

Mohamed Rachid Benhadj (Arabic: رشيد بن حاج, born 12 July 1949) is an Algerian film director and screenwriter.

== Life and career ==
Born in Algiers, Benhadj studied architecture and cinema at the University of Paris. He made his professional debut working for the Radiodiffusion Télévision Algérienne as a documentarist. His feature film debut Louss (aka Desert Rose, 1989) received wide critical acclaim. In the 1990s he decided to settle permanently in Italy. Starting with his second film Touchia, his films got more socially and politically committed. He is also a painter.

== Filmography ==
- Louss (1988)
- Touchia (1992)
- L'ultima cena (1995)
- Mirka (2000)
- For Bread Alone (2006)
- Parfumes of Algiers (2012)
- The Star of Algiers (2016)
- Matarès (2019)
