= List of awards and nominations received by Ennio Morricone =

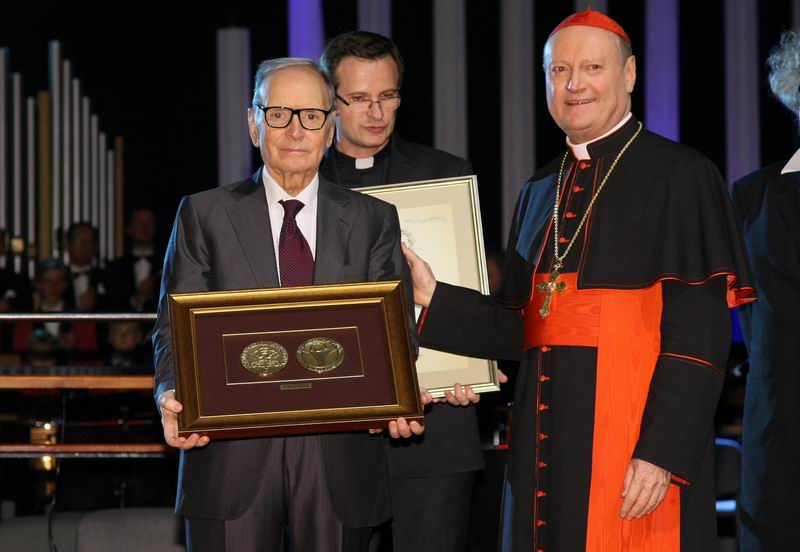
Ennio Morricone receives the Per Artem ad Deum Medal (English: Through Arts to God) from archbishop Gianfranco Ravasi in 2012

Ennio Morricone OMRI (10 November 1928 – 6 July 2020) was an Italian composer, orchestrator, conductor, and trumpet player who wrote music in a wide range of styles. He composed over 400 scores for cinema and television, as well as over 100 classical works. His best-known compositions include "The Ecstasy of Gold", "Se telefonando", "Man with a Harmonica", "Here's to You", the UK No. 2 single "Chi mai", "Gabriel's Oboe" and "E più ti penso". In 1971, he received a "Targa d'Oro" for worldwide sales of 22 million, and by 2016 Morricone had sold over 70 million records worldwide. In 2007, he received the Academy Honorary Award "for his magnificent and multifaceted contributions to the art of film music." He was nominated for a further six Oscars, and in 2016, received his only competitive Academy Award for his score to Quentin Tarantino's film The Hateful Eight, at the time becoming the oldest person ever to win a competitive Oscar. His other achievements include three Grammy Awards, three Golden Globes, six BAFTAs, ten David di Donatello, eleven Nastro d'Argento, two European Film Awards, the Golden Lion Honorary Award and the Polar Music Prize in 2010. Morricone has influenced many artists from film scoring to other styles and genres, including Hans Zimmer, Danger Mouse, Dire Straits, Muse, Metallica, and Radiohead.

Morricone received his first Academy Award nomination in 1979 for the score to Days of Heaven (Terrence Malick, 1978). Eight years later, Morricone received his second Oscar nomination for The Mission. He also received Oscar nominations for his scores to The Untouchables (1987), Bugsy (1991), Malèna (2000), and The Hateful Eight (2016). In February 2016, Morricone won his first and only competitive Academy Award for his score to The Hateful Eight. Morricone and Alex North are the only composers to receive the Academy Honorary Award since its introduction in 1928. He received the award in February 2007, "for his magnificent and multifaceted contributions to the art of film music." In conjunction with the honor, Morricone released a tribute album, We All Love Ennio Morricone, that included as its centerpiece Celine Dion's rendition of "I Knew I Loved You" (based on "Deborah's Theme" from Once Upon a Time in America), which she performed at the ceremony. Behind-the-scenes studio production and recording footage of "I Knew I Loved You" can be viewed in the debut episode of the QuincyJones.com Podcast. The lyric, as with his Love Affair, had been written by Alan and Marilyn Bergman. Morricone's acceptance speech was in his native Italian tongue and was interpreted by Clint Eastwood.

== Major associations ==
=== Academy Awards ===
Year	Category	Nominated work	Result	Ref.
1978	Best Original Score	Days of Heaven	Nominated	
1986	Best Original Score	The Mission	Nominated	
1987	Best Original Score	The Untouchables	Nominated	
1991	Best Original Score	Bugsy	Nominated	
2000	Best Original Score	Malèna	Nominated	
2006	Honorary Academy Award		Won	
2015	Best Original Score	The Hateful Eight	Won	

=== BAFTA Awards ===
Year	Category	Nominated work	Result	Ref.
British Academy Film Awards
1979	Anthony Asquith Award for Film Music	Days of Heaven	Won	
1984	Best Original Score	Once Upon a Time in America	Won	
1986	Best Original Score	The Mission	Won	
1987	Best Original Score	The Untouchables	Won	
1990	Best Original Score	Cinema Paradiso	Won	
2015	Best Original Score	The Hateful Eight	Won	

=== Golden Globe ===
Year	Category	Nominated work	Result	Ref.
1981	Best Original Song	"It's Wrong For Me To Love You" (from Butterfly)	Nominated	
1984	Best Original Score	Once Upon a Time in America	Nominated	
1986	Best Original Score	The Mission	Won	
1987	Best Original Score	The Untouchables	Nominated	
1989	Best Original Score	Casualties of War	Nominated	
1991	Best Original Score	Bugsy	Nominated	
1999	Best Original Score	The Legend of 1900	Won	
2000	Best Original Score	Malèna	Nominated	
2015	Best Original Score	The Hateful Eight	Won	

=== Grammy Awards ===
Year	Category	Nominated work	Result	Ref.
1988	Best Score Soundtrack	The Untouchables	Won	
1995	Best Score Soundtrack	Wolf	Nominated	
1997	Best Score Soundtrack	The Star Maker	Nominated	
1999	Best Score Soundtrack	Bulworth	Nominated	
2007	Best Instrumental Performance	Once Upon a Time in the West	Won	
2009	Grammy Hall of Fame	The Good, the Bad and the Ugly	Won	
2014	Grammy Trustees Award		Won	
2017	Best Score Soundtrack	The Hateful Eight	Nominated	
2017	Best Instrumental Composition	'L'Ultima Diligenza Di Red Rock – Versione Integrale'	Nominated	

== Miscellaneous awards ==
=== American Film Institute ===
In 2005 four film scores by Ennio Morricone were nominated by the American Film Institute for an honoured place in the AFI's Top 25 of Best American Film Scores of All Time. His score for The Mission was ranked 23rd in the Top 25 list.

Year	Project	Category	Result
1968	Once Upon a Time in the West	Top 25 Best American Film Scores of All Time	Nominated
1984	Once Upon a Time in America	Top 25 Best American Film Scores of All Time	Nominated
1986	The Mission	Top 25 Best American Film Scores of All Time	Won
1987	The Untouchables	Top 25 Best American Film Scores of All Time	Nominated

=== ASCAP Awards ===
Year	Project	Category	Result
1988	The Untouchables	Best Original Score	Won
1994	In the Line of Fire	Best Original Score	Won
1994	Life Achievement Award		Won
1995	Wolf	Best Original Score	Won

=== César Awards ===
Year	Project	Category	Result
1980	I... comme Icare	Best Original Score	Nominated
1980	Le Professionnel	Best Original Score	Nominated
2016	En mai, fais ce qu'il te plaît	Best Original Score	Nominated

=== David di Donatello Awards ===
Year	Project	Category	Result
1981	The Lady of the Camellias	Best Original Score	Nominated
1981	Bianco, rosso e Verdone	Best Original Score	Nominated
1988	Gli Occhiali d'Oro	Best Original Score	Won
1989	Cinema Paradiso	Best Original Score	Won
1990	Mio Caro Dottor Gräsler	Best Original Song	Nominated
1990	Stanno Tutti Bene	Best Original Score	Won
1993	Jona Che Visse Nella Balena	Best Original Score	Won
1993	The Escort	Best Original Score	Nominated
1996	The Star Maker	Best Original Score	Nominated
1999	Legend of 1900	Best Original Score	Won
2000	Canone inverso	Best Original Score	Won
2001	Malèna	Best Original Score	Nominated
2006	50th Anniversary David		Won
2007	La Sconosciuta	Best Original Score	Won
2010	Baarìa	Best Original Score	Won
2013	The Best Offer	Best Original Score	Won
2016	The Correspondence	Best Composer	Nominated

=== European Film Awards ===
Year	Project	Category	Result
1999	Lifetime Achievement Award		Won
2005	Fateless	Best Composer	Nominated
2013	The Best Offer	Best Composer	Won

=== Globo d'oro (Italian Golden Globes) ===
Year	Project	Category	Result
1993	Jona Che Visse Nella Balena	Best Original Score	Nominated
1993	Il Lungo Silenzio	Best Original Score	Won
1994	A Pure Formality	Best Original Score	Nominated
2000	Canone inverso	Best Original Score	Nominated
2013	The Best Offer	Best Original Score	Nominated

=== Los Angeles Film Critics Association ===
Year	Project	Category	Result
1984	Once Upon a Time in America	Best Original Score	Won
1986	The Mission	Best Original Score	2nd Place
2001	Career Achievement Award		Won
2015	The Hateful Eight	Best Original Score	2nd Place

=== Nastro d'Argento Award ===
Year	Project	Category	Result
1964	A Fistful of Dollars	Best Original Score	Won
1970	Metti, una sera a cena	Best Original Score	Won
1972	Sacco e Vanzetti	Best Original Score	Won
1985	Once Upon a Time in America	Best Original Score	Won
1988	The Untouchables	Best Original Score	Won
1999	Legend of 1900	Best Original Score	Won
2000	Canone inverso	Best Original Score	Won
2001	Malèna	Best Original Score	Nominated
2004	Al Cuore Si Comanda	Best Original Score	Nominated
2007	La Sconosciuta	Best Original Score	Won
2008	I Demoni di San Pietroburgo	Best Original Score	Won
2010	Baaria	Best Original Score	Won
2013	The Best Offer	Best Original Score	Won

== Selected other awards ==
- 1967: Diapason d'Or
- 1969: Premio Spoleto Cinema
- 1972: Cork Film International for Lady Caliph
- 1979: Premio Vittorio de Sica
- 1981: Premio della critica discografica for Il prato
- 1984: Premio Zurlini
- 1986: Premio Vittorio de Sica
- 1988: Ninth Annual Ace Winner for Il Giorno prima
- 1989: Pardo d'Oro alla carriera Locarno Film Festival
- 1990: Prix Fondation Sacem del XLIII Cannes Film Festival for Nuovo Cinema Paradiso
- 1992: Pentagramma d'oro
- 1992: Premio Michelangelo
- 1992: Grolla d'oro, alla carriera (Saint Vincent)
- 1993: Efebo d'Argento for Jonas che visse nella balena
- 1993: Gran Premio SACEM audiovisivi
- 1994: ASCAP Golden Soundtrack Award (Los Angeles)
- 1994: 7 d'Or, "Best Music" for La piovra, season 5
- 1995: Premio Rota
- 1995: Golden Lion Honorary Award by the Venice Film Festival
- 1996: Premio città di Roma
- 1996: Premio Cappelli
- 1996: Premio Accademia di Santa Cecilia
- 1997: Premio Flaiano
- 1998: Columbus Prize
- 1999: Erich Wolfgang Korngold Internationaler Preis für Film
- 2000: Honorary Degree by the University of Cagliari
- 2001: Mikeldi de Honor at "Zinebi – International Festival of Documentary and Short Films" of Bilbao
- 2002: Honorary Degree by the "Seconda Università" of Rome
- 2003: Golden Eagle Award by the Russian National Academy of Motion Pictures Arts and Sciences of Russia for 72 Meters (film)
- 2003: Honorary Senator of the Filmscoring Class of the Hochschule für Musik und Theater München
- 2006: Grand Officer OMRI, nominated by Carlo Azeglio Ciampi
- 2007: The Film & TV Music Award for Lifetime Achievement
- 2008: Pablo Neruda Order of Artistic and Cultural Merit, Chile's highest award for the arts
- 2008: Knight of the Legion of Honour
- 2009: Medal of Merits for Macedonia
- 2009: America Award of the Italy–USA Foundation
- 2010: Polar Music Prize of the Royal Swedish Academy of the Arts
- 2012: Per Artem ad Deum Medal
- 2013: Special Award for Career Achievement at the Online Film Critics Society Awards
- 2013: Honoris Causa honorary academic degree at New Bulgarian University
- 2016: Star on the Hollywood Walk of Fame in the category of Live Performance/Theatre.
- 2019: Pontifical Gold Medal from Pope Francis, presented by Cardinal Gianfranco Ravasi
- 2020: Camille Award
- 2020: Princess of Asturias Award in the category of Arts
