= Yo-Yo Ma Plays Ennio Morricone =

Studio album by Yo-Yo Ma and Ennio Morricone
- Released: September 28, 2004, re-released February 8, 2005
- Recorded: Forum Music Village, Rome, Italy, June 16-June 23, 2003
- Genre: Classical
- Length: 55:49
- Label: Sony Classical
- Producer: Ennio Morricone

Yo-Yo Ma and Ennio Morricone chronology
| Obrigado Brazil Live in Concert (2004) | Yo-Yo Ma Plays Ennio Morricone (2004) | Silk Road Journeys: Beyond the Horizon (2004) |

Professional ratings
Review scores
| Source | Rating |
|---|---|
| Allmusic | 4.5/5 stars |

Yo-Yo Ma Plays Ennio Morricone is a 2004 album of recordings from Morricone's various film scores by cellist Yo-Yo Ma and Ennio Morricone. The album was recorded with the Roma Sinfonietta Orchestra and Gilda Buttà on piano. Morricone functioned as orchestrator, conductor, and producer. It was released as a standard compact disc on September 28, 2004 (093456), and a DualDisc using Dolby Digital 5.1 Surround Sound on February 8, 2005 (093472). Ma also toured a suite of Morricone's music.

The album stayed 105 weeks on the Billboard Top Classical Albums.

== Track listing ==
The Mission

1. "Gabriel's Oboe" – 3:11
2. "The Mission: The Falls" – 2:27

Giuseppe Tornatore Suite

3. "The Legend of 1900: Playing Love" – 1:49
4. "Cinema Paradiso: Nostalgia" – 1:58
5. "Cinema Paradiso: Looking for You" – 1:43
6. "Malèna: Main Theme" – 4:22
7. "A Pure Formality: Main Theme" – 3:49

Sergio Leone Suite

8. "Once Upon a Time in America: Deborah's Theme" – 3:32
9. "Once Upon a Time in America: Cockeye's Song" – 2:13
10. "Once Upon a Time in America: Main Theme" – 1:49
11. "Once Upon a Time in the West: Main Theme" – 3:21
12. "The Good, the Bad, and the Ugly: Ecstasy of Gold" – 3:57

Brian De Palma Suite

13. "Casualties of War: Main Theme" – 3:54
14. "The Untouchables: Death Theme" – 3:10

Moses and Marco Polo Suite

15. "Moses: Journey" – 2:34
16. "Moses: Main Theme" – 2:07
17. "Marco Polo: Main Theme" – 3:21

The Lady Caliph

18. "Dinner" – 3:51
19. "Nocturne" – 2:33
