= Forum Music Village =

Recording studio in Rome, Italy

Coordinates: 41°55′38.56″N 12°28′51.88″E

Forum Music Village (previously called Ortophonic Recording Studio) is a recording studio located in Rome, Italy underneath the Sacro Cuore di Maria. It was founded by Ennio Morricone, Armando Trovajoli, Luis Bacalov and Piero Piccioni with the studio manager and producer Enrico De Melis in 1969. The studio has some peculiarities one of them is the ability to record a church organ directly to the studio.

Founder and Academy Award winner Ennio Morricone used the studio to create his scores for over forty years. The studio has hosted many directors who have worked alongside him, including Brian De Palma, Oliver Stone and Barry Levinson. The Academy Award-winning scores of "Il Postino: The Postman" by Luis Bacalov and "Life Is Beautiful" by Nicola Piovani were recorded in Studio A of Forum Music Village.

The studio has played host to international artists such as Quincy Jones, Placido Domingo, Andrea Bocelli, Red Hot Chili Peppers, will.i.am, Morrissey and Cher.

== The history of the studios ==
=== The foundation, Ortophonic (1970–1979) ===
At the end of the 1960s Ennio Melis, manager of the Soundtracks section of the Italian RCA, knew about the availability of the underground spaces of the Basilica of the Sacred Heart of Mary and the possibility of creating and founding recording studios. The projects were presented to the conductor and arranger Bruno Nicolai, the sound engineers Sergio Marcotulli and Pino Mastroianni, and the composer and arranger Armando Trovajoli who immediately involves his colleagues Luis Bacalov, Ennio Morricone and Piero Piccioni.

The Ortophonic Studios were thus founded on 5 May 1970.

From 1970 to 1979, led by the Four Maestros and De Melis, the studios are one of the top recording facilities in Italy, hosting artists as Fabrizio De André, Mireille Mathieu, and Gato Barbieri – together with the Founding Maestros -, being part of the creation of huge masterpieces between pop music and soundtrack: from Storia di un impiegato, to Concerto Grosso per i New Trolls, the soundtrack of Last tango in Paris, Deep Red, Febbre da Cavallo and the music for Aggiungi un posto a tavola, for the first staging with an unforgettable Johnny Dorelli.

The perfect acoustic, the capacity of Studio A built to catch the sound of large symphonic ensembles, the wise and skillful work of the sound engineers, and the intense creativity and mastery of the most important stars of pop and film music increased the development and the credibility of the Studios. In less than a decade, Ortophonic were considered both in Italy and internationally an authentic "temple of sound", everyday witness of the creation of thousands of music productions.

=== The international success, Studio Forum (1979–1996) ===
In 1979 the studios changed their name in Studi Forum, being detected by Franco Patrignani: very respected sound engineer with a long time experience in RCA and Sonic Studios, together with his wife Emma Gibellini. The two led the studios for more than twenty years, stimulating the growth and reputation on both technical and management sides, continuously working on updating old technology from analogical to the digital era.

This is the age of main international development of the studios, which will host artists as Duran Duran, George Garvarentz, Inti-Illimani, Leonard Bernstein, Alex North, Chet Baker, Maurice Jarre, Jerry Goldsmith, Evan Lurie, Roman Vlad, Mauro Maur, Vangelis and many more. With them, also Italian big names as Renato Zero, Raffaella Carrà, Claudio Baglioni, Fred Bongusto, Nicola Piovani, Domenico Modugno, Adriano Celentano, Renzo Arbore, Riz Ortolani, Massimo Ranieri, Zucchero, Francesco De Gregori, Jovanotti, Alex Britti, Franco Battiato, Andrea Bocelli and many many more.

Also, the Four Founding Maestro are often hosted in the studios, and right during these years, big masterpieces were created as the Academy Award Winners Cinema Paradiso (Ennio Morricone), Il Postino: The Postman (Luis Bacalov), and unforgettable soundtracks as Once Upon a Time in America (Ennio Morricone).

The awards won by all of the music created in the studios during these years are uncountable: Platinum Records, Academy Awards, David di Donatello, Bears of Berlin, and Nastro d’Argento.

=== The next generation, Forum Music Village (1996–2020) ===
In the middle of the Nineties, the studios were ready for a change, needing a severe updating both on technical and management areas.

That's when Forum Music Village was born, in 1996, with Marco Patrignani (the son of Franco and Emma), executive producer and cultural entrepreneur, getting the lead of the company and the responsibility to preserve the legacy of the historic recording rooms in piazza Euclide: expanding the activities through the production of international live events and Cine-concerts.

Between all the activities, the foundation in 2010 of the Orchestra Italiana del Cinema – chair by Patrignani himself -, the first ensemble dedicated to perform Italian and international Film Music masterpieces, bringing for the first time ever in the theaters and auditoriums all over the country the Harry Potter Concert Serie and inside the Colosseum arena Gladiator in cine-concert, for a benefit event in collaboration with the Bill & Melinda Gates Foundation and the Rotary Club, attended by the Academy Award Winner Russell Crowe.

But life at the studios didn't stop: following a huge technology update, to coordinate the activity of the recording rooms comes Fabio Patrignani, Marco’s brother and one of the best sound engineers still today, boasting such remarkable Italian and international collaborations, from film music to pop, rock, and jazz – among others Ennio Morricone, Nicola Piovani, Julian Lennon, Dolores O’Riordan, Danger Mouse, Vangelis and 2Cellos.

From the foundation of Forum Music Village, uncountable artists and composers worked in the historic recording rooms, bringing music and production on a larger level, shaping the studios in a real cradle of big success: from Academy Awards Winners as Life Is Beautiful (Nicola Piovani) and The Hateful Eight (Ennio Morricone), to the Platinum Records of Morrissey, Placido Domingo, Andrea Bocelli, Il Volo, Renato Zero, Claudio Baglioni and Giorgia, hosting producers like Bob Ezrin, Rob Ellis and Robert Kraft, and world-renowned directors as Brian De Palma, Oliver Stone, Barry Levinson, Sergio Leone, Federico Fellini, Bernardo Bertolucci, Giuseppe Tornatore, Mario Monicelli, Franco Zeffirelli, Dario Argento, Steno, the Taviani brothers, Pupi Avati, Dino Risi and many more.

=== The future, Forum Studios (2020–...) ===
After twenty-five years of huge success between the studios, the orchestra, and the international events, after fifty years from the foundation, in the year 2020 Forum Music Village with all of its wide experience, begun a new rebranding operation, creating the Forum Studios which include: the historic recording studios in piazza Euclide; the Forum Theatre (ex Teatro Euclide), an immersive interdisciplinary theatre, from acting to live music, corporate events, and movie screenings; the Limbus Club, a private club based inside the studios with a restaurant, cocktail bar, and an exclusive events program; the strengthening of all the environment and expertise dedicated to live events production, video streaming, and multimedia events, with top technologies both on audio and video side; the continuation and enlarging of the Orchestra Italiana del Cinema tours and concerts, in Italy and all over the world: China, Saudi Arabia, and many more countries.

== Between vintage and latest technologies ==
=== The technologies ===
In fifty years of history, Forum Studios have repeatedly modernized recording technologies, going from analog tape machines to the most modern software and digital desks.

Below a short list of historical machines still present in the facilities of the studios:

- Studer A820 2", 24 track
- Studer A820 1/4", 2 track
- Studer A810 1/4", 2 track
- Studer A80 1/2", 2 track
- Sony PCM-3324S Digital
- Neve VR Legend 60Ch con Flying Faders
- Harrison 32C

In addition to the machines, inside the studio rooms there are real "sound structures", such as the four historic Echo chambers from 1970, one of which is still functioning and plugged with Studio A – and whose unmistakable sound it can be heard in the song Dear God Please Help Me, from the album Ringleaders of the tormentors by the award-winning British artist Morrissey.

=== The musical instruments ===
In the studios there are also various Musical instruments, mostly orchestral ones.

Some of these have played in important musical works:

- Tubular bells Premier (The Good, the Bad and the Ugly)
- Vintage "steel" upright piano (Indagine su un cittadino al di sopra di ogni sospetto)
- Celesta Mustel Paris (Life Is Beautiful, Il Postino: The Postman)
- Keyboard glockenspiel Mustel Paris (Deep Red, Life Is Beautiful, Il Postino: The Postman)

== Studio credits ==
=== Selected albums recorded or mixed at the studio ===
- Alessandro Alessandroni
  - Sangue di sbirro (1976)
- Pasquale Catalano
  - Barney's Versio (2010)
- Mychael Danna
  - The Nativity Story (additional recording) (2006)
- Alexandre Desplat
  - Tales of Tales (2015)
- Fabrizio De André
  - Non al denaro non-all'amore né al cielo (1971)
  - Storia di un impiegato (1973)
- Goblin
  - Cherry Five (1975)
  - Roller (1976)
- Andrea Guerra
  - Hotel Rwanda (2004)
- Il Giardino dei Semplici
  - M'innamorai / Una storia (1975)
- Ivan Iusco
  - Ho voglia di te (film) (2007)
- Enzo Jannacci
  - Tira a campà from the 1976 album O vivere o ridere
- Mauro Maur
  - La Tromba Classica Contemporanea (1993)
  - Mauro Maur e I Suoi Solisti (1996)
- Amedeo Minghi
  - Amedeo Minghi (1973)
- Ennio Morricone
  - La Smagliatura (1975)
  - Autostop Rosso Sangue (1977)
  - Dedicato Al Mare Egeo (1979)
  - Once Upon a Time in America (1984)
  - Casualties of War (1988)
  - The Endless Game (1989)
  - Cacciatori di navi (1990)
  - Bugsy (1991)
  - City of Joy (1992)
  - In the Line of Fire (1993)
  - Disclosure (1994)
  - Love Affair (1994)
  - A Pure Formality (1994)
  - U Turn (1997)
  - Lolita (1997)
  - Nostromo (1997)
  - The Legend of 1900 (1998)
  - Canone inverso (2000)
  - Malèna (2000)
  - Ripley's Game (2002)
  - 72 Meters (2004)
  - Fateless (2004)
  - Karol: A Man Who Became Pope (2005)
  - Karol: The Pope, The Man (2006)
  - The Unknown Woman (2006)
  - The Demons of St. Petersberg (2008)
  - The Best Offer (2013)
- Bruno Nicolai
  - La coda dello scorpione (1971)
  - La dama rossa uccide sette volte (1972)
  - Il tuo vizio è una stanza chiusa e solo io ne ho la chiave (1972)
  - Perchè quelle strane gocce di sangue sul corpo di Jennifer (1972)
  - Tutti i colori del buio (1972)
- Amália Rodrigues
  - A una terra che amo (1973)
- New Trolls
  - Concerto grosso per i New Trolls (1971)
- Jon and Vangelis
  - Page of Life (1991)
- Piero Piccioni, Ennio Morricone, Franco Bixio, Fabio Frizzi & Vince Tempera
  - Dove vai in vacanza? (1978)
- Pino Donaggio
  - Hercules (1983)
- Luis Bacalov
  - Il Postino (1995)
- Carmen Consoli
  - Confusa e felice (1997)
- Franco Piersanti
  - I Prefer the Sound of the Sea (2000)
- Nicola Piovani
  - La vita è bella (1997)
  - The Son's Room (2001)
- Stefano Reali and Jacopo Fiastri
  - Le ali della vita (2000)
- Ennio Morricone and Dulce Pontes
  - Focus (2003)
- Yo-Yo Ma
  - Yo-Yo Ma Plays Ennio Morricone (2004)
- Charlie Haden
  - Not in Our Name (2005)
- Seu Jorge
  - The Life Aquatic Studio Sessions (2005)
- Morrissey
  - Ringleader of the Tormentors (2006)
- Stefano Lentini
  - Bakhita o.s.t. (2009)
- Sunn
  - Big Church from Monoliths & Dimensions (2009)
- Danger Mouse and Daniele Luppi
  - Rome (2011)
- Mokadelic
  - ACAB (2011)
- Armando Trovajoli
  - The Dinner

=== See also ===
- Digitmovies AE
- Cinevox
- Nicola Piovani

=== External links ===
- Official website
- Forum Music Village discography at Discogs
