= Inglourious Basterds (soundtrack) =

2009 soundtrack album

Quentin Tarantino's Inglourious Basterds: Motion Picture Soundtrack

Soundtrack album by Various artists
- Released: August 18, 2009
- Genres: Film score; schlager; new wave
- Length: 37:14
- Languages: English; German; French
- Labels: A Band Apart; Maverick; Warner Bros.
- Producer: Holly Adams

Professional ratings
Review scores
Source	Rating
AllMusic	3.5/5 stars
Empire	4/5 stars
PopMatters	8/10 stars
Pitchfork	(7.2/10)
Slant Magazine	3/5 stars

Quentin Tarantino's Inglourious Basterds: Motion Picture Soundtrack is the soundtrack to Quentin Tarantino's motion picture Inglourious Basterds. It was originally released on August 18, 2009. The soundtrack uses a variety of music genres, including Spaghetti Western soundtrack excerpts, R&B and a David Bowie song from the 1982 remake of Cat People. "The Man with the Big Sombrero", a song from the 1943 screwball comedy Hi Diddle Diddle, was rerecorded in French for the movie. This is the first soundtrack for a Quentin Tarantino film not to feature dialogue excerpts. The album was nominated for a Grammy Award for Best Compilation Soundtrack Album for a Motion Picture, Television or Other Visual Media, but lost to the Slumdog Millionaire soundtrack.

== Track listing ==
No.	Title	Writer(s)	Artist(s)	Length
1.	"The Green Leaves of Summer (Note: Originally from the 1960 film The Alamo)"	Dimitri Tiomkin	Nick Perito & His Orchestra	1:55
2.	"The Verdict (La condanna) (Note: Originally from the 1967 film The Big Gundown)"	Ennio Morricone	Ennio Morricone	1:14
3.	"White Lightning (Main Title) (Note: Originally from the 1973 film White Lightning)"	Charles Bernstein	Charles Bernstein	2:55
4.	"Slaughter (Note: Originally from the 1972 film Slaughter)"	Billy Preston	Billy Preston	4:24
5.	"The Surrender (La resa) (Note: Originally from the 1967 film The Big Gundown)"	Morricone	Ennio Morricone	2:48
6.	"One Silver Dollar (Un Dollaro Bucato) (Note: Originally from the 1965 film Blood for a Silver Dollar)"	Gianni Ferrio	Gianni Ferrio	2:05
7.	"Davon geht die Welt nicht unter"	Bruno Balz; Michael Jary	Zarah Leander	2:06
8.	"The Man with the Big Sombrero (Note: Original English-language version by June Havoc from the 1943 film Hi Diddle Diddle)"	Foster Carling; Phil Boutelje	Samantha Shelton & Michael Andrew	1:50
9.	"Ich wollt' ich wär' ein Huhn"	Hans-Fritz Beckmann; Peter Kreuder	Lilian Harvey & Willy Fritsch	2:45
10.	"Main Theme from Dark of the Sun (Note: Originally from the 1968 film Dark of the Sun)"	Jacques Loussier	Jacques Loussier	3:11
11.	"Cat People (Putting Out Fire) (Note: Originally from the 1982 film Cat People)"	David Bowie; Giorgio Moroder	David Bowie	4:10
12.	"Tiger Tank (Note: Originally from the 1970 film Kelly's Heroes)"	Lalo Schifrin	Lalo Schifrin	1:17
13.	"Un Amico (Note: Originally from the 1973 film Revolver)"	Morricone	Ennio Morricone	2:35
14.	"Rabbia e Tarantella (Note: Originally from the 1974 film Allonsanfàn)"	Morricone	Ennio Morricone	3:53
Total length:				37:14

== Film music not included on the album ==
1. "L'incontro Con La Figlia" – Ennio Morricone (from Il ritorno di Ringo)
2. "Il Mercenario (ripresa)" – Ennio Morricone (from Il mercenario)
3. "Algiers November 1, 1954" – Ennio Morricone & Gillo Pontecorvo (from La battaglia di Algeri)
4. "Hound Chase (intro)" – Charles Bernstein (from White Lightning)
5. "The Saloon" – Riz Ortolani (from Al di là della legge)
6. "Bath Attack" – Charles Bernstein (from The Entity)
7. "Claire's First Appearance" – Jacques Loussier (from Dark of the Sun)
8. "The Fight" – Jacques Loussier (from Dark of the Sun)
9. "Mystic and Severe" – Ennio Morricone (from Da uomo a uomo)
10. "The Devil's Rumble" – Davie Allan & The Arrows
11. "What'd I Say" – Rare Earth
12. "Zulus" – Elmer Bernstein (from Zulu Dawn)
13. "Eastern Condors" – Ting Yat Chung (from Eastern Condors)
14. "Titoli" – Angelo Francesco Lavagnino (from The Last Days of Pompeii) – used as the opening titles for the film-within-a-film, Nation's Pride

== Promotional video ==
A music video for the French-language version of "The Man with the Big Sombrero" was directed by Meiert Avis. Using the scene of the movie Hi Diddle Diddle where the song was originally performed by June Havoc, singer Samantha Shelton was digitally inserted into the scene, carefully mimicking the exact choreography done by Havoc in the previous film.

== Personnel ==
- Executive Producer: Quentin Tarantino
- Music Supervisor: Mary Ramos
- Soundtrack Producers: Lawrence Bender, Pilar Savone, and Holly Adams
