= Ennio Morricone =

Italian composer and conductor (1928–2020)

Ennio Morricone OMRI
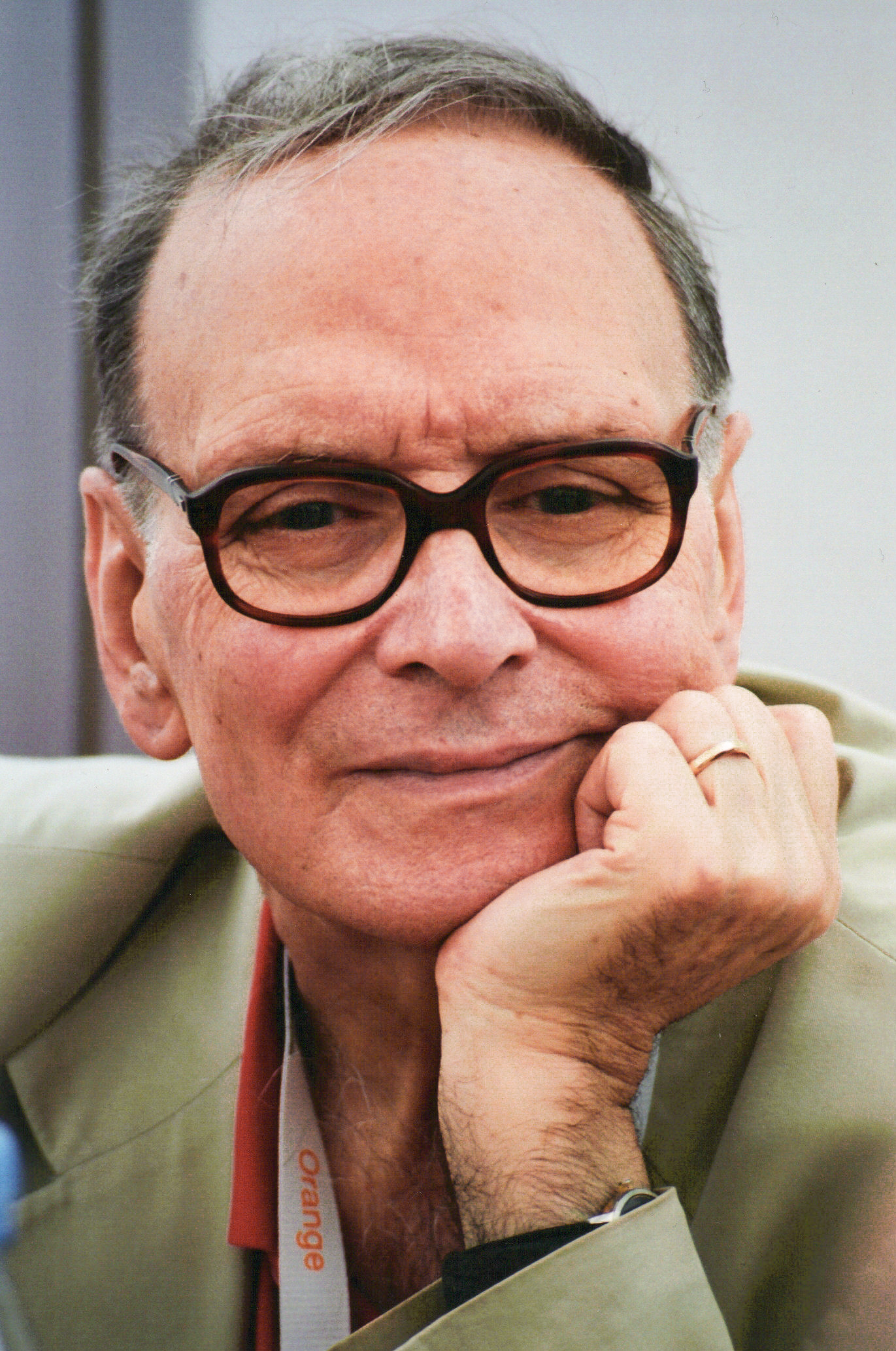
- Morricone at the 2007 Cannes Film Festival

Background information
- Also known as: Maestro; Dan Savio; Leo Nichols
- Born: Ennio Morricone; 10 November 1928; Rome, Lazio, Kingdom of Italy
- Died: 6 July 2020 (aged 91) Rome, Lazio, Italy
- Genres: Film score; classical; absolute music; jazz; pop; rock; avant-garde
- Occupations: Composer; orchestrator; conductor; musician; producer
- Instruments: Trumpet; piano
- Years active: 1946–2020
- Spouse: Maria Travia (m. 1956)
- Website: enniomorricone.org

Ennio Morricone (Note: /ˈɛnjoʊ mɒrəˈkoʊni, -neɪ/ EN-yoh MORR-ə-KOH-nee, -nay; Italian: [ˈɛnnjo morriˈkoːne]) (10 November 1928 – 6 July 2020) was an Italian composer, orchestrator, conductor, trumpeter, and pianist who wrote music in a wide range of styles. With more than 400 scores for cinema and television, as well as more than 100 classical works, Morricone is widely considered one of the greatest and most prolific film composers of all time. He received numerous accolades throughout his career, including two Academy Awards, three Grammy Awards, three Golden Globes, six BAFTAs, ten David di Donatello, eleven Nastro d'Argento, two European Film Awards, the Golden Lion Honorary Award, and the Polar Music Prize.

His filmography includes more than 70 award-winning films, all of Sergio Leone's films from A Fistful of Dollars on, all of Giuseppe Tornatore's films since Cinema Paradiso, Dario Argento's Animal Trilogy, as well as The Battle of Algiers (1966), 1900 (1976), La Cage aux Folles (1978), Le Professionnel (1981), The Thing (1982), The Key (1983) by Tinto Brass and Tie Me Up! Tie Me Down! (1989). He received the Academy Award for Best Original Score nominations for Days of Heaven (1978), The Mission (1986), The Untouchables (1987), Bugsy (1991), Malèna (2000) and The Hateful Eight (2015), winning for the last. He won the Academy Honorary Award in 2007. His score to The Good, the Bad and the Ugly (1966) is regarded as one of the most influential soundtracks in history. It was inducted into the Grammy Hall of Fame in 2008.

After playing the trumpet in jazz bands in the 1940s, Morricone became a studio arranger for RCA Victor and in 1955 started ghost writing for film and theatre. Throughout his career, he composed music for artists such as Paul Anka, Mina, Milva, Zucchero, and Andrea Bocelli. From 1960 to 1975, he gained international fame for composing music for Westerns and—with an estimated 10 million copies sold—Once Upon a Time in the West is one of the best-selling scores worldwide. From 1966 to 1980, he was a main member of Il Gruppo, one of the first experimental composers collectives. In 1969, he co-founded Forum Music Village, a prestigious recording studio. He continued to compose music for European productions, such as Marco Polo, La piovra, Nostromo, Fateless, Karol, and En mai, fais ce qu'il te plait.

Morricone composed for Hollywood directors such as Don Siegel, Mike Nichols, Brian De Palma, Barry Levinson, William Friedkin, Oliver Stone, Warren Beatty, John Carpenter, and Quentin Tarantino. He has also worked with directors such as Bernardo Bertolucci, Mauro Bolognini, Tinto Brass, Giuliano Montaldo, Roland Joffé, Wolfgang Petersen, Roman Polanski, Henri Verneuil, Mario Bava, Lucio Fulci, Umberto Lenzi, Gillo Pontecorvo, and Pier Paolo Pasolini. His best-known compositions include "The Ecstasy of Gold", "Se telefonando", "Man with a Harmonica", "Here's to You", "Chi mai", "Gabriel's Oboe", and "E più ti penso". He has influenced many artists including Hans Zimmer, Danger Mouse, Dire Straits, Muse, Metallica, Fields of the Nephilim, and Radiohead.

On May 10, 2016, Mondadori Libri published his official autobiography, Ennio Morricone. Inseguendo quel suono. La mia musica, la mia vita. Written in conversation with Alessandro De Rosa, the book has been reprinted several times in Italy, translated into the world's major languages, transcribed and published in English under the title Ennio Morricone: In His Own Words by Oxford University Press in 2019, and described by Morricone himself in the preface as "the best book ever written about me, the most authentic, the most detailed and well curated. The truest."

== Early life and education ==
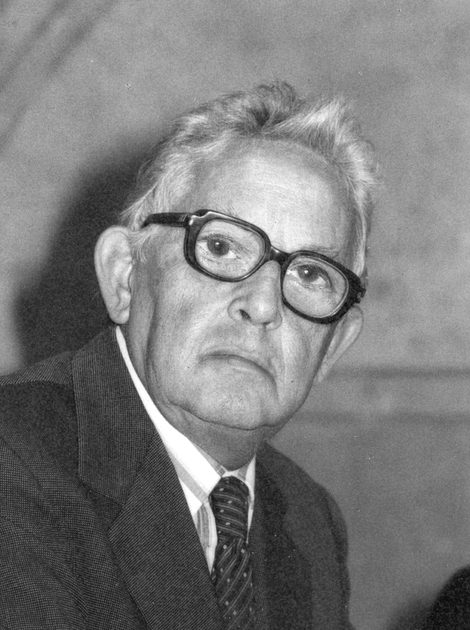
Goffredo Petrassi, Morricone's teacher

Morricone was born in Rome, the son of Libera Ridolfi and Mario Morricone, a musician. At the time of his birth, Italy was under fascist rule. Morricone had four siblings – Adriana, Aldo, (Note: Aldo died aged three of enterocolitis.) Maria, and Franca – and lived in Trastevere in the centre of Rome. His father was a professional trumpeter who performed in light-music orchestras while his mother set up a small textile business. During his early schooldays, Morricone was also a classmate of his later collaborator Sergio Leone.

Morricone's father taught him to read music and to play several instruments. He entered the Saint Cecilia Conservatory to take trumpet lessons under the guidance of Umberto Semproni. He formally entered the conservatory in 1940 at age 12, enrolling in a four-year harmony program that he completed within six months. He studied the trumpet, composition, and choral music under the direction of Goffredo Petrassi, to whom Morricone would later dedicate concert pieces. In 1941, Morricone was chosen among the students of the Saint Cecilia Conservatory to be a part of the Orchestra of the Opera, directed by Carlo Zecchi on the occasion of a tour of the Veneto region. He received his diploma in trumpet in 1946, continuing to work in classical composition and arrangement. Morricone received the Diploma in Instrumentation for Band Arrangement with a mark of 9/10 in 1952. His studies concluded at the Conservatory of Santa Cecilia in 1954 when he obtained a final 9.5/10 in his Diploma in Composition under Petrassi.

== Career ==
=== First compositions ===
Morricone wrote his first compositions when he was six years old, and he was encouraged to develop his natural talents. In 1946, he composed "Il Mattino" ("The Morning") for voice and piano on a text by Fukuko, first in a group of seven "youth" Lieder. In the following years, he continued to write music for the theatre as well as classical music for voice and piano, such as "Imitazione", based on a text by Italian poet Giacomo Leopardi, "Intimità", based on a text by Olinto Dini, "Distacco I" and "Distacco II" with words by R. Gnoli, "Oboe Sommerso" for baritone and five instruments with words by poet Salvatore Quasimodo, and "Verrà la Morte", for alto and piano, based on a text by novelist Cesare Pavese.

In 1953, Morricone was asked by Gorni Kramer and Lelio Luttazzi to write an arrangement for some medleys in an American style for a series of evening radio shows. Many of his orchestral and chamber compositions were written in 1954–1959: Musica per archi e pianoforte (1954), Invenzione, Canone e Ricercare per piano; Sestetto per flauto, oboe, fagotto, violino, viola, e violoncello (1955), Dodici Variazione per oboe, violoncello, e piano; Trio per clarinetto, corno, e violoncello; Variazione su un tema di Frescobaldi (1956); Quattro pezzi per chitarra (1957); Distanze per violino, violoncello, e piano; Musica per undici violini, Tre Studi per flauto, clarinetto, e fagotto (1958); and the Concerto per orchestra (1957), dedicated to his teacher Goffredo Petrassi. Morricone soon gained popularity by writing his first background music for radio dramas and quickly moved into film. Nevertheless, he continued to compose classical music later in his career. In 1995, he was commissioned to write the opera Partenope. The opera was first premiered on December 12, 2025, five years after Morricone's death.

==== Composing for radio, television, and pop artists ====
Morricone's career as an arranger began in 1950, by arranging the piece Mamma Bianca (Narciso Parigi). On occasion of the "Anno Santo" (Holy Year), he arranged a long group of popular songs of devotion for radio broadcasting. In 1956, Morricone started to support his family by playing in a jazz band and arranging pop songs for the Italian broadcasting service RAI. He was hired by RAI in 1958 but quit his job on his first day at work when he was told that broadcasting of music composed by employees was forbidden by a company rule. Subsequently, Morricone became a top studio arranger at RCA Victor, working with Renato Rascel, Rita Pavone, Domenico Modugno, and Mario Lanza.

Throughout his career, Morricone composed songs for several national and international jazz and pop artists, including Gianni Meccia (Il barattolo, 1960), Gianni Morandi (Go Kart Twist, 1962; Non son degno di te, 1964), Alberto Lionello (La donna che vale, 1959), Edoardo Vianello (Ornella, 1960; Cicciona cha-cha, 1960; Faccio finta di dormire, 1961; T'ho conosciuta, 1963; and also Pinne, fucine ed occhiali, I Watussi and Guarda come dondolo), Nora Orlandi (Arianna, 1960), Jimmy Fontana (Twist no. 9; Nicole, 1962), Rita Pavone (Come te non c'e' nessuno and Pel di carota from 1962, arranged by Luis Bacalov), Catherine Spaak (Penso a te; Questi vent'anni miei, 1964), Luigi Tenco (Quello che conta; Tra tanta gente; 1962), Gino Paoli (Nel corso from 1963, written by Morricone with Paoli), Renato Rascel (Scirocco, 1964), Paul Anka (Ogni Volta), Amii Stewart, Rosy Armen (L'Amore Gira), Milva (Ridevi, Metti Una Sera A Cena), Françoise Hardy (Je changerais d'avis, 1966), Mireille Mathieu (Mon ami de toujours; Pas vu, pas pris, 1971; J'oublie la pluie et le soleil, 1974), and Demis Roussos (I Like The World, 1970).

In 1963, the composer co-wrote (with Roby Ferrante) the music for the composition "Ogni volta" ("Every Time"), a song that was performed by Paul Anka for the first time during the Festival di Sanremo in 1964. This song was arranged and conducted by Morricone and sold more than three million copies worldwide, including one million copies in Italy alone. Another success was his composition "Se telefonando". Performed by Mina, it was a track on Studio Uno 66, the 4th studio album by Mina. Morricone's sophisticated arrangement of "Se telefonando" was a combination of melodic trumpet lines, Hal Blaine–style drumming, a string set, a 1960s Europop female choir, and intensive subsonic-sounding trombones. The Italian Hitparade No. 7 song had eight transitions of tonality building tension throughout the chorus. During the following decades, the song was recorded by several performers in Italy and abroad including covers by Françoise Hardy and Iva Zanicchi (1966), Delta V (2005), Vanessa and the O's (2007), and Neil Hannon (2008). Françoise Hardy – Mon amie la rose site in the reader's poll conducted by the newspaper la Repubblica to celebrate Mina's 70th anniversary in 2010, 30,000 voters picked the track as the best song ever recorded by Mina.

In 1987, Morricone co-wrote It Couldn't Happen Here with the Pet Shop Boys. Other compositions for international artists include: La metà di me and Immagina (1988) by Ruggero Raimondi, Libera l'amore (1989) performed by Zucchero, Love Affair (1994) by k.d. lang, Ha fatto un sogno (1997) by Antonello Venditti, Di Più (1997) by Tiziana Tosca Donati, Come un fiume tu (1998), Un Canto (1998) and Conradian (2006) by Andrea Bocelli, Ricordare (1998) and Salmo (2000) by Angelo Branduardi, and My heart and I (2001) by Sting.

==== First film scores ====
After graduation in 1954, Morricone started to write and arrange music as a ghost writer for films credited to already well-known composers, while also arranging for many light music orchestras of the RAI television network, working especially with Armando Trovajoli, Alessandro Cicognini, and Carlo Savina. He occasionally adopted Anglicized pseudonyms, such as Dan Savio and Leo Nichols.

In 1959, Morricone was the conductor (and uncredited co-composer) for Mario Nascimbene's score to Morte di un amico (Death of a Friend), an Italian drama directed by Franco Rossi. In the same year, he composed music for the theatre show Il lieto fine by Luciano Salce. 1961 marked his real film debut with Luciano Salce's The Fascist. In an interview with American composer Fred Karlin, Morricone discussed his beginnings, stating, "My first films were light comedies or costume movies that required simple musical scores that were easily created, a genre that I never completely abandoned even when I went on to much more important films with major directors".

With The Fascist Morricone began a long-running collaboration with Luciano Salce. In 1962, Morricone composed the jazz-influenced score for Salce's comedy Crazy Desire. That year, Morricone also arranged Italian singer Edoardo Vianello's summer hit "Pinne, fucile, e occhiali", a cha-cha song, peppered with added water effects, unusual instrumental sounds and unexpected stops and starts. Morricone wrote works for the concert hall in a more avant-garde style. Some of these have been recorded, such as Ut, a trumpet concerto dedicated to Mauro Maur.

=== The Group and New Consonance ===
From 1964 up to their eventual disbandment in 1980, Morricone was part of Gruppo di Improvvisazione Nuova Consonanza (G.I.N.C.), a group of composers who performed and recorded avant-garde free improvisations. The Rome-based avant-garde ensemble was dedicated to the development of improvisation and new music methods. The ensemble functioned as a laboratory of sorts, working with anti-musical systems and sound techniques in an attempt to redefine the new music ensemble and explore "New Consonance".

Known as "The Group" or "Il Gruppo", they released seven albums across the Deutsche Grammophon, RCA, and Cramps labels: Gruppo di Improvvisazione Nuova Consonanza (1966), The Private Sea of Dreams (1967), Improvisationen (1968), The Feedback (1970), Improvvisazioni a Formazioni Variate (1973), Nuova Consonanza (1975), and Musica su Schemi (1976). Perhaps the most famous of these is their album entitled The Feed-back, which combines free jazz and avant-garde classical music with funk; the album frequently is sampled by hip hop DJs and is considered to be one of the most collectable records in existence, often fetching more than $1,000 at auction.

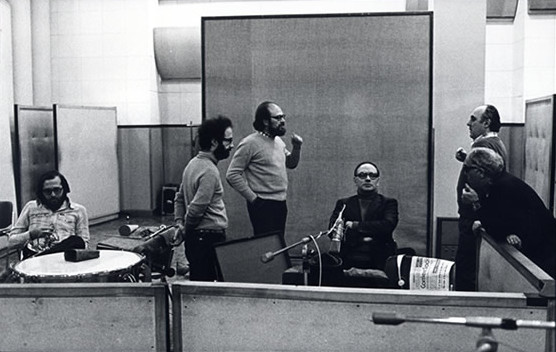
Morricone in 1978 with Gruppo di Improvvisazione Nuova Consonanza

Morricone played a key role in The Group and was among the core members in its revolving line-up; in addition to serving as their trumpet player, he directed them on many occasions and they can be heard on a large number of his scores. Held in high regard in avant-garde music circles, they are considered to be the first experimental composers collective, their only peers being the British improvisation collective AMM. Their influence can be heard in free improvising ensembles from the European movements including the Evan Parker Electro-Acoustic Ensemble, the Swiss electronic free improvisation group Voice Crack, John Zorn, and in the techniques of modern classical music and avant-garde jazz groups. The ensemble's groundbreaking work informed their work in composition. The ensemble also performed in varying capacities with Morricone, contributing to some of his 1960s and 1970s Italian soundtracks, including A Quiet Place in the Country (1969) and Cold Eyes of Fear (1971).

=== Film music genres ===
==== Comedy ====
Morricone's earliest scores were Italian light comedy and costume pictures, where he learned to write simple, memorable themes. During the 1960s and 1970s he composed the scores for comedies such as Eighteen in the Sun (Diciottenni al sole, 1962), Il Successo (1963), Lina Wertmüller's The Lizards (I basilischi, 1963), Slalom (1965), Menage all'italiana (Menage Italian Style, 1965), How I Learned to Love Women (Come imparai ad amare le donne, 1966), Her Harem (L'harem, 1967), A Fine Pair (Ruba al prossimo tuo, 1968), L'Alibi (1969), This Kind of Love (Questa specie d'amore, 1972), Winged Devils (Forza "G", 1972), and Fiorina la vacca (1972). His best-known scores for comedies includes La Cage aux Folles (1978) and La Cage aux Folles II (1980), both directed by Édouard Molinaro, Il ladrone (The Good Thief, 1980), Georges Lautner's La Cage aux Folles 3: The Wedding (1985), Pedro Almodóvar's Tie Me Up! Tie Me Down! (1990) and Warren Beatty's Bulworth (1998). Morricone never ceased to arrange and write music for comedies. In 2007, he composed a lighthearted score for the Italian romantic comedy Tutte le Donne della mia Vita by Simona Izzo, the director who co-wrote the Morricone-scored religious mini-series Il Papa Buono.

==== Westerns ====
Although his first films were undistinguished, Morricone's arrangement of an American folk song intrigued director and former schoolmate Sergio Leone. Before being associated with Leone, Morricone had already composed some music for less-known western movies such as Gunfight at Red Sands (1963). In 1962, Morricone met American folksinger Peter Tevis, with the two collaborating on a version of Woody Guthrie's "Pastures of Plenty". Tevis is credited with singing the lyrics of Morricone's songs such as "A Gringo Like Me" (from Gunfight at Red Sands) and "Lonesome Billy" (from Bullets Don't Argue). Tevis later recorded a vocal version of A Fistful of Dollars that was not used in the film.

===== Association with Sergio Leone =====
The turning point in Morricone's career took place in 1964, the year in which his third child, Andrea Morricone, who would also become a film composer, was born. Film director and former schoolmate Sergio Leone hired Morricone, and together they created a distinctive score to accompany Leone's different version of the Western, A Fistful of Dollars (1964).

===== Dollars Trilogy =====
Because budget strictures limited Morricone's access to a full orchestra, he used gunshots, cracking whips, whistle, voices, jew's harp, trumpets, and the new Fender electric guitar, instead of orchestral arrangements of Western standards à la John Ford. Morricone used his special effects to punctuate and comically tweak the action—cluing in the audience to the taciturn man's ironic stance.As memorable as Leone's close-ups, harsh violence, and black comedy, Morricone's work helped to expand the musical possibilities of film scoring. Initially, Morricone was billed on the film as Dan Savio, a name they had used on Gunfight at Red Sands to help its appeal on the international market. A Fistful of Dollars came out in Italy in 1964 and was released in America three years later, greatly popularising the so-called Spaghetti Western genre. For the American release, Sergio Leone followed Morricone and Massimo Dallamano's lead and decided to adopt an American-sounding name, Bob Robertson. Over the film's theatrical release, it grossed more than any other Italian film up to that point. The film debuted in the United States in January 1967, where it grossed US$4.5 million for the year. It eventually grossed $14.5 million in its American release, against its budget of US$200,000.

With the score of A Fistful of Dollars, Morricone began his 20-year collaboration with his childhood friend Alessandro Alessandroni and his Cantori Moderni. Alessandroni provided the whistling and the twanging guitar on the film scores, while his Cantori Moderni were a flexible troupe of modern singers. Morricone in particular drew on the solo soprano of the group, Edda Dell'Orso, at the height of her powers "an extraordinary voice at my disposal". The composer subsequently scored Leone's other two Dollars Trilogy (or Man with No Name Trilogy) spaghetti westerns: For a Few Dollars More (1965) and The Good, the Bad, and the Ugly (1966). All three films starred the American actor Clint Eastwood as The Man With No Name and depicted Leone's own intense vision of the mythical West. Morricone commented in 2007: "Some of the music was written before the film, which was unusual. Leone's films were made like that because he wanted the music to be an important part of it; he kept the scenes longer because he did not want the music to end." According to Morricone this explains "why the films are so slow".

Despite the small film budgets, the Dollars Trilogy was a box-office success. The available budget for The Good, the Bad, and the Ugly was about US$1.2 million, but it became the most successful film of the Dollars Trilogy, grossing US$25.1 million in the United States and more than Lire 2.3 billion (1.2 million EUR) in Italy alone. Morricone's score became a major success and sold more than three million copies worldwide. On 14 August 1968 the original score was certified by the RIAA with a golden record for the sale of 500,000 copies in the United States alone. The main theme to The Good, the Bad, and the Ugly, also titled "The Good, the Bad and the Ugly", was a hit in 1968 for Hugo Montenegro, whose rendition was a No. 2 Billboard pop single in the U.S. and a U.K. No.1 single (for four weeks from mid-November that year).

"The Ecstasy of Gold" became one of Morricone's best-known compositions. The opening scene of Jeff Tremaine's Jackass Number Two (2006), in which the cast is chased through a suburban neighbourhood by bulls, is accompanied by this piece. While punk rock band The Ramones used "The Ecstasy of Gold" as a closing theme during their live performances, Metallica uses "The Ecstasy of Gold" as the introductory music for its concerts since 1983. This composition is also included on Metallica's live symphonic album S&M as well as the live album Live Shit: Binge & Purge. An instrumental metal cover by Metallica (with minimal vocals by lead singer James Hetfield) appeared on the 2007 Morricone tribute album We All Love Ennio Morricone. This metal version was nominated for a Grammy Award in the category of Best Rock Instrumental Performance. In 2009, the Grammy Award-winning hip-hop artist Coolio extensively sampled the theme for his song "Change".

===== Once Upon a Time in the West and others =====
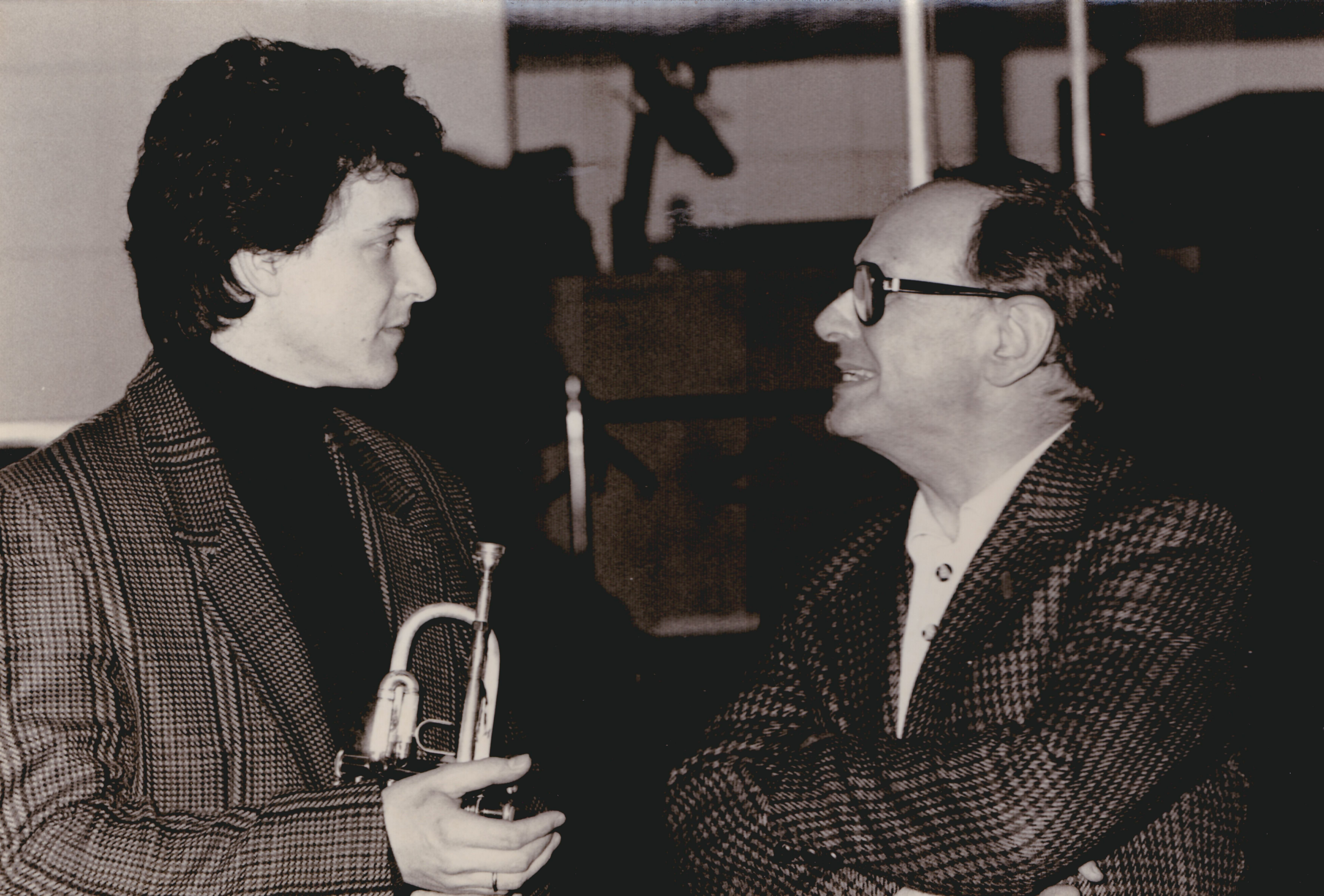
Ennio Morricone while recording a soundtrack with his favorite trumpet player and friend Mauro Maur – Forum Studios in Rome

Subsequent to the success of the Dollars trilogy, Morricone also composed the scores for Once Upon a Time in the West (1968) and Leone's last credited western film A Fistful of Dynamite (1971), as well as the score for My Name Is Nobody (1973). Morricone's score for Once Upon a Time in the West is one of the best-selling original instrumental scores in the world today, with as many as 10 million copies sold, including one million copies in France, and more than 800,000 copies in the Netherlands.

The collaboration with Leone is considered one of the exemplary collaborations between a director and a composer. Morricone's last score for Leone was for his last film, the gangster drama Once Upon a Time in America (1984). Leone died on 30 April 1989 of a heart attack at the age of 60. Before his death in 1989, Leone was part-way through planning a film on the Siege of Leningrad, set during World War II. By 1989, Leone had been able to acquire US$100 million in financing from independent backers for the war epic. He had convinced Morricone to compose the film score. The project was cancelled when Leone died two days before he was to officially sign on for the film. In early 2003, Italian filmmaker Giuseppe Tornatore announced he would direct a film called Leningrad. The film has yet to go into production and Morricone was cagey as to details on account of Tornatore's superstitious nature.

===== Association with Sergio Corbucci and Sergio Sollima =====
Two years after the start of his collaboration with Sergio Leone, Morricone also started to score music for another Spaghetti Western director, Sergio Corbucci. The composer wrote music for Corbucci's Navajo Joe (1966), The Hellbenders (1967), The Mercenary/The Professional Gun (1968), The Great Silence (1968), Compañeros (1970), Sonny and Jed (1972), and What Am I Doing in the Middle of the Revolution? (1972). In addition, Morricone composed music for the western films by Sergio Sollima, The Big Gundown (with Lee Van Cleef, 1966), Face to Face (1967), and Run, Man, Run (1968), as well as the 1970 crime thriller Violent City (with Charles Bronson) and the poliziottesco film Revolver (1973).

==== Other westerns ====
Other relevant scores for less popular Spaghetti Westerns include Gunfight at Red Sands (1963), Bullets Don't Argue (1964), A Pistol for Ringo (1965), The Return of Ringo (1965), Seven Guns for the MacGregors (1966), The Hills Run Red (1966), Giulio Petroni's Death Rides a Horse (1967) and Tepepa (1968), A Bullet for the General (1967), Guns for San Sebastian (with Charles Bronson and Anthony Quinn, 1968), A Sky Full of Stars for a Roof (1968), The Five Man Army (1969), Don Siegel's Two Mules for Sister Sara (1970), Life Is Tough, Eh Providence? (1972), and Buddy Goes West (1981).

==== Dramas and political movies ====
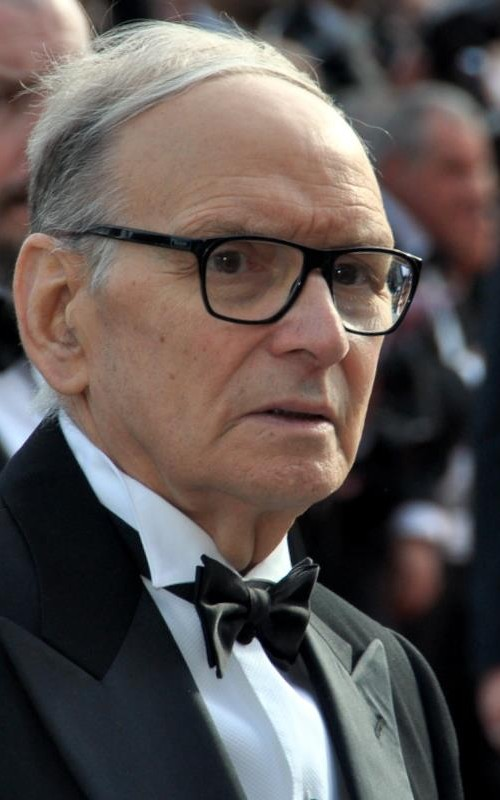
Morricone in 2012

With Leone's films, Morricone's name had been put firmly on the map. Most of Morricone's film scores of the 1960s were composed outside the Spaghetti Western genre, while still using Alessandroni's team. Their music included the themes for Il Malamondo (1964), Slalom (1965), and Listen, Let's Make Love (1967). In 1968, Morricone reduced his work outside the movie business and wrote scores for 20 films in the same year. The scores included psychedelic accompaniment for Mario Bava's superhero romp Danger: Diabolik (1968).

Morricone collaborated with Marco Bellocchio (Fists in the Pocket, 1965), Gillo Pontecorvo (The Battle of Algiers (1966), and Queimada! (1969) with Marlon Brando), Roberto Faenza (H2S, 1968), Giuliano Montaldo (Sacco & Vanzetti, 1971), Giuseppe Patroni Griffi ('Tis Pity She's a Whore, 1971), Mauro Bolognini (Drama of the Rich, 1974), Umberto Lenzi (Almost Human, 1974), Pier Paolo Pasolini (Salò, or the 120 Days of Sodom, 1975), Bernardo Bertolucci (Novecento, 1976), and Tinto Brass (The Key, 1983 and Senso '45, 2002).

In 1970, Morricone wrote the score for Violent City. That same year, he received his first Nastro d'Argento for the music in Metti una sera a cena (Giuseppe Patroni Griffi, 1969) and his second only a year later for Sacco & Vanzetti (Giuliano Montaldo, 1971), in which he collaborated with the legendary American folk singer and activist Joan Baez. His soundtrack for Sacco & Vanzetti contains another well-known composition by Morricone, the folk song "Here's to You", sung by Baez. For the writing of the lyrics, Baez was inspired by a letter from Bartolomeo Vanzetti: "Father, yes, I am a prisoner / Fear not to relay my crime". The song was later included in movies such as The Life Aquatic with Steve Zissou.

==== Giallo and horror ====
Morricone's eclecticism found its way to films in the horror genre, such as the giallo thrillers of Dario Argento, from The Bird with the Crystal Plumage (1970), The Cat o' Nine Tails (1971), and Four Flies on Grey Velvet (1971) to The Stendhal Syndrome (1996) and The Phantom of the Opera (1998). His other horror scores include Nightmare Castle (1965), A Quiet Place in the Country (1968), The Antichrist (1974), and Night Train Murders (1975). In addition, Morricone composed music for many popular and cult Italian giallo films, such as Unknown Woman (1969), Forbidden Photos of a Lady Above Suspicion (1970), A Lizard in a Woman's Skin (1971), Cold Eyes of Fear (1971), The Fifth Cord (1971), Short Night of Glass Dolls (1971), The Black Belly of the Tarantula (1971) My Dear Killer (1972), What Have You Done to Solange? (1972), Who Saw Her Die? (1972), Spasmo (1974), and Autopsy (1975). In 1977 Morricone scored John Boorman's Exorcist II: The Heretic and Alberto De Martino's apocalyptic horror film Holocaust 2000, starring Kirk Douglas. In 1982 he composed the score for John Carpenter's science fiction horror movie The Thing. Morricone's main theme for the film was reflected in Marco Beltrami's film's score of prequel of the 1982 film, which was released in 2011.

=== Hollywood career ===
The Dollars Trilogy was not released in the United States until 1967, when United Artists, who had already enjoyed success distributing the British-produced James Bond films in the United States, decided to release Sergio Leone's Spaghetti Westerns. The American release gave Morricone an exposure in America, and his film music became quite popular in the United States.

One of Morricone's first contributions to an American director concerned his music for the religious epic film The Bible: In the Beginning... by John Huston. According to Sergio Miceli's book Morricone, la musica, il cinema, Morricone wrote about 15 or 16 minutes of music, which were recorded for a screen test and conducted by Franco Ferrara. At first, Morricone's teacher Goffredo Petrassi had been engaged to write the score for the great big-budget epic, but Huston preferred another composer. RCA Records then proposed Morricone who was under contract with them, but a conflict between the film's producer Dino De Laurentiis and RCA occurred. The producer wanted to have exclusive rights for the soundtrack, while RCA still had the monopoly on Morricone at that time and did not want to release the composer. Subsequently, Morricone's work was rejected because he did not get permission from RCA to work for Dino De Laurentiis alone. The composer reused the parts of his unused score for The Bible: In the Beginning in such films as The Return of Ringo (1965) by Duccio Tessari and Alberto Negrin's The Secret of the Sahara (1987).

Morricone never left Rome to compose his music and never learned to speak English. But given that he always worked in a wide field of composition genres, from "absolute music", which he always produced, to "applied music", working as orchestrator as well as conductor in the recording field, and then as a composer for theatre, radio, and cinema, the impression arises that he never really cared about his standing in the eyes of Hollywood.

==== 1970–1985: From Two Mules to Red Sonja ====
In 1970, Morricone composed the music for Don Siegel's Two Mules for Sister Sara, an American-Mexican western film starring Shirley MacLaine and Clint Eastwood. The same year the composer also delivered the title theme The Men from Shiloh for the American Western television series The Virginian. In 1974–1975, Morricone wrote music for Spazio 1999, an Italian-produced compilation movie made to launch the Italian-British television series Space: 1999, while the original episodes featured music by Barry Gray. A soundtrack album was only released on CD in 2016 and on LP in 2017. In 1975 he scored the George Kennedy revenge thriller The "Human" Factor, which was the final film of director Edward Dmytryk. Two years later, he composed the score for the sequel to William Friedkin's 1973 film The Exorcist, directed by John Boorman: Exorcist II: The Heretic. The horror film was a major disappointment at the box office. The film grossed US$30,749,142 in the United States.

In 1978, the composer worked with Terrence Malick for Days of Heaven starring Richard Gere, for which he earned his first nomination at the Oscars for Best Original Score. Despite the fact that Morricone had produced some of the most popular and widely imitated film music ever written throughout the 1960s and 1970s, Days of Heaven earned him his first Oscar nomination for Best Original Score, with his score up against Jerry Goldsmith's The Boys from Brazil, Dave Grusin's Heaven Can Wait, Giorgio Moroder's Midnight Express (the eventual winner), and John Williams's Superman: The Movie at the Oscar ceremonies in 1979.

==== 1986–2020: From The Mission to The Hateful Eight ====
Association with Roland Joffé

The Mission, directed by Joffé, was about a piece of history considerably more distant, as Spanish Jesuit missionaries see their work undone as a tribe of Paraguayan natives falls within a territorial dispute between the Spanish and Portuguese. At one point the score was one of the world's best-selling film scores, selling over 3 million copies worldwide. Morricone finally received a second Oscar nomination for The Mission. Morricone's original score lost out to Herbie Hancock's coolly arranged jazz on Bertrand Tavernier's Round Midnight. It was considered a surprising win and a controversial one, given that much of the music in the film was pre-existing. Morricone stated the following during a 2001 interview with The Guardian: "I definitely felt that I should have won for The Mission. Especially when you consider that the Oscar winner that year was Round Midnight, which was not an original score. It had a very good arrangement by Herbie Hancock, but it used existing pieces. So there could be no comparison with The Mission. There was a theft!" His score for The Mission was ranked at number 1 in a poll of the all-time greatest film scores. The top 10 list was compiled by 40 film composers such as Michael Giacchino and Carter Burwell. The score is ranked 23rd on the AFI's list of 25 greatest film scores of all time.

==== Association with De Palma and Levinson ====
On three occasions, Brian De Palma worked with Morricone: The Untouchables (1987), the 1989 war drama Casualties of War and the science fiction film Mission to Mars (2000). Morricone's score for The Untouchables resulted in his third nomination for the Academy Award for Best Original Score. In a 2001 interview with The Guardian, Morricone stated that he had good experiences with De Palma: "De Palma is delicious! He respects music, he respects composers. For The Untouchables, everything I proposed to him was fine, but then he wanted a piece that I didn't like at all, and of course, we didn't have an agreement on that. It was something I didn't want to write – a triumphal piece for the police. I think I wrote nine different pieces for this in total and I said, 'Please don't choose the sixth!' because it was the worst. And guess what he chose? The sixth one. But it really suits the movie."

Barry Levinson, another American director, commissioned the composer on two occasions. First, for the crime-drama Bugsy, starring Warren Beatty, which received ten Oscar nominations, winning two for Best Art Direction-Set Decoration (Dennis Gassner and Nancy Haigh) and Best Costume Design. Of Morricone, Levinson said: "He doesn't have a piano in his studio, I always thought that with composers, you sit at the piano, and you try to find the melody. There's no such thing with Morricone. He hears a melody, and he writes it down. He hears the orchestration completely done."

==== Other notable Hollywood scores ====
During his career in Hollywood, Morricone was approached for numerous other projects, including the Gregory Nava drama A Time of Destiny (1988), Frantic by Polish-French director Roman Polanski (1988, starring Harrison Ford), Franco Zeffirelli's 1990 drama film Hamlet (starring Mel Gibson and Glenn Close), the neo-noir crime film State of Grace by Phil Joanou (1990, starring Sean Penn and Ed Harris), Rampage (1992) by William Friedkin, and the romantic drama Love Affair (1994) by Warren Beatty.

==== Association with Quentin Tarantino ====
In 2009, Tarantino originally wanted Morricone to compose the film score for Inglourious Basterds. Morricone was unable to, because the film's sped-up production schedule conflicted with his scoring of Giuseppe Tornatore's Baarìa. However, Tarantino did use eight tracks composed by Morricone in the film, with four of them included on the soundtrack. The tracks came originally from Morricone's scores for The Big Gundown (1966), Revolver (1973) and Allonsanfàn (1974).

In 2012, Morricone composed the song "Ancora Qui" with lyrics by Italian singer Elisa for Tarantino's Django Unchained, a track that appeared together with three existing music tracks composed by Morricone on the soundtrack. "Ancora Qui" was one of the contenders for an Academy Award nomination in the Best Original Song category, but eventually the song was not nominated. On 4 January 2013 Morricone presented Tarantino with a Life Achievement Award at a special ceremony being cast as a continuation of the International Rome Film Festival. In 2014, Morricone was misquoted as claiming that he would "never work" with Tarantino again, and later agreed to write an original film score for Tarantino's The Hateful Eight, which won him an Academy Award in 2016 in the Best Original Score category. His nomination for this film marked him at that time as the second oldest nominee in Academy history, behind Gloria Stuart. Morricone's win marked his first competitive Oscar, and at the age of 87, he became the oldest person at the time to win a competitive Oscar.

=== Composer for Giuseppe Tornatore ===
In 1988, Morricone started an ongoing and very successful collaboration with Italian director Giuseppe Tornatore. His first score for Tornatore was for the drama film Cinema Paradiso. The international version of the film won the Special Jury Prize at the 1989 Cannes Film Festival and the 1989 Best Foreign Language Film Oscar. Morricone received a BAFTA award with his son Andrea, and a David di Donatello for his score. In 2002, the director's cut 173-minute version was released (known in the US as Cinema Paradiso: The New Version). After the success of Cinema Paradiso, the composer wrote the music for all subsequent films by Tornatore: the drama film Everybody's Fine (Stanno Tutti Bene, 1990), A Pure Formality (1994) starring Gérard Depardieu and Roman Polanski, The Star Maker (1995), The Legend of 1900 (1998) starring Tim Roth, the 2000 romantic drama Malèna (which featured Monica Bellucci) and the psychological thriller mystery film La sconosciuta (2006). Morricone also composed the scores for Baarìa (2009), The Best Offer (2013) starring Geoffrey Rush, Jim Sturgess, and Donald Sutherland, and the romantic drama The Correspondence (2015). The composer won several music awards for his scores in Tornatore's movies. Morricone received a fifth Academy Award nomination and a Golden Globe nomination for Malèna. For Legend of 1900, he won a Golden Globe Award for Best Original Score. In September 2021 Tornatore presented out of competition at the 78th Venice International Film Festival a documentary film about Morricone, Ennio.

=== Television series and last works ===
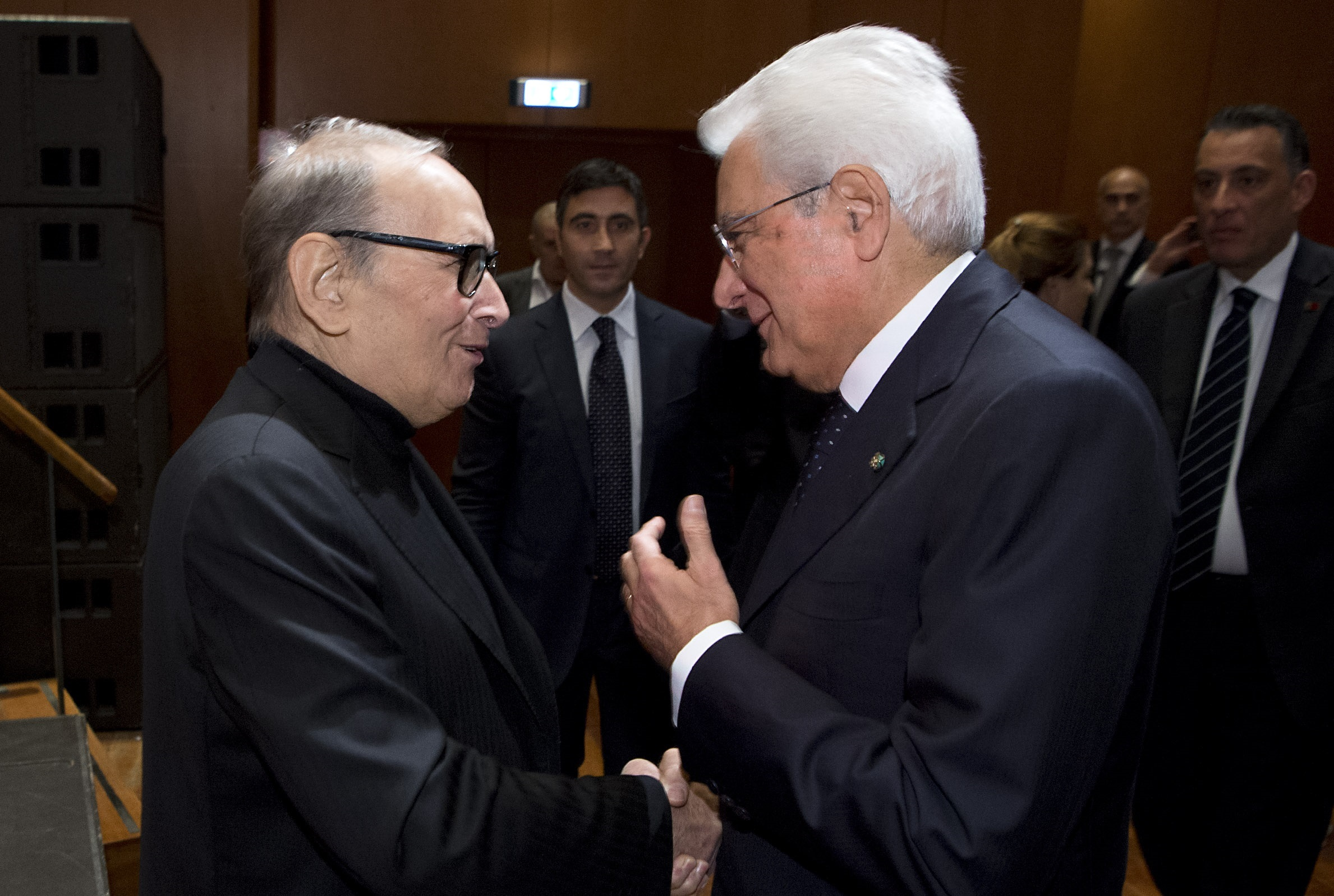
Morricone with the Italian President, Sergio Mattarella, in 2016

Morricone wrote the score for the Mafia television series La piovra seasons 2 to 10 from 1985 to 2001, including the themes "Droga e sangue" ("Drugs and Blood"), "La Morale", and "L'Immorale". Morricone worked as the conductor of seasons 3 to 5 of the series. He also worked as the music supervisor for the television project La bibbia ("The Bible"). In the late 1990s, he collaborated with his son Andrea on the Ultimo crime dramas, resulting in Ultimo (1998), Ultimo 2 – La sfida (1999), Ultimo 3 – L'infiltrato (2004) and Ultimo 4 – L'occhio del falco (2013). For Canone inverso (2000) based on the music-themed novel of the same name by the Paolo Maurensig, directed by Ricky Tognazzi and starring Hans Matheson, Morricone won Best Score awards in the David di Donatello Awards and Silver Ribbons.

In the 2000s, Morricone continued to compose music for successful television series such as Il Cuore nel Pozzo (2005), Karol: A Man Who Became Pope (2005), La provinciale (2006), Giovanni Falcone (2007), Pane e libertà (2009) and Come Un Delfino 1–2 (2011–2013). Morricone provided the string arrangements on Morrissey's "Dear God Please Help Me" from the album Ringleader of the Tormentors in 2006. In 2008, the composer recorded music for a Lancia commercial, featuring Richard Gere and directed by Harald Zwart (known for directing The Pink Panther 2).

In spring and summer 2010, Morricone worked with Hayley Westenra for a collaboration on her album Paradiso. The album features new songs written by Morricone, as well as some of his best-known film compositions of the last 50 years. Westenra recorded the album with Morricone's orchestra in Rome during the summer of 2010. Since 1995, he composed the music for several advertising campaigns of Dolce & Gabbana. The commercials were directed by Giuseppe Tornatore. In 2013, Morricone collaborated with Italian singer Laura Pausini on a new version of her hit single "La solitudine" for her 20 years anniversary greatest hits album 20 – The Greatest Hits. Morricone composed the music for The Best Offer (2013) by Giuseppe Tornatore.

Morricone wrote the score for Christian Carion's En mai, fais ce qu'il te plait (2015) and the most recent movie by Tornatore: The Correspondence (2016), featuring Jeremy Irons and Olga Kurylenko. In July 2015, Quentin Tarantino announced after the screening of footage of his movie The Hateful Eight at San Diego Comic-Con that Morricone would score the film, the first Western that Morricone scored since 1981. The score was critically acclaimed and won several awards including the Golden Globe Award for Best Original Score and the Academy Award for Best Original Score. In June 2015, Morricone premiered his Missa Papae Francisci (Mass for Pope Francis) at Rome's Chiesa del Gesù with the Orchestra Roma Sinfonietta and choruses from the Accademia Santa Cecilia and the Rome Opera Theater.

== Live performances ==
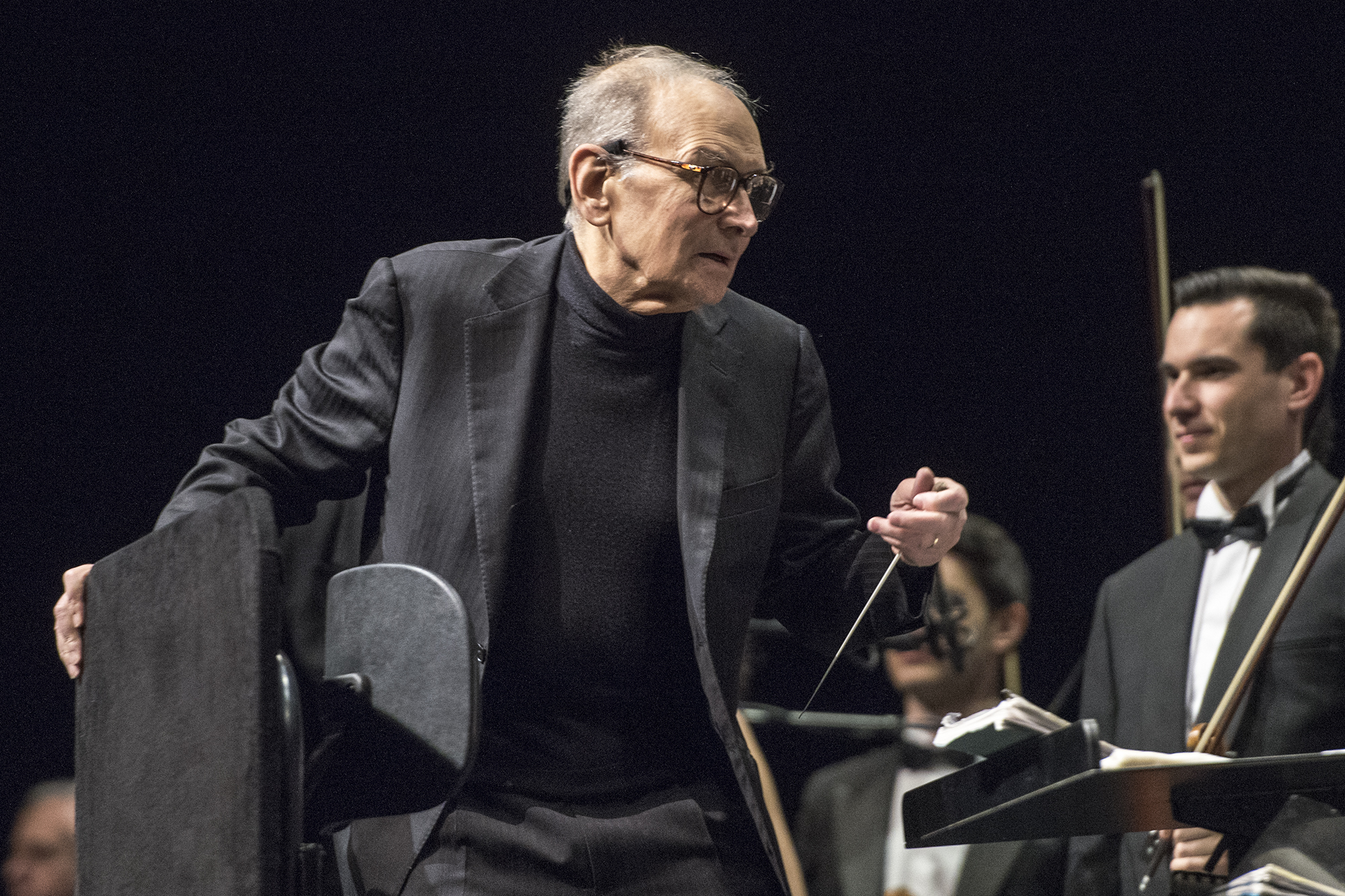
Morricone in the Festhalle Frankfurt in 2015

Before receiving his diplomas in trumpet, composition and instrumentation from the conservatory, Morricone was already active as a trumpet player, often performing in an orchestra that specialised in music written for films. After completing his education at Saint Cecilia, the composer honed his orchestration skills as an arranger for Italian radio and television. In order to support himself, he moved to RCA in the early sixties and entered the front ranks of the Italian recording industry. Since 1964, Morricone was also a founding member of the Rome-based avant-garde ensemble Gruppo di Improvvisazione Nuova Consonanza. During the existence of the group (until 1978), Morricone performed several times with the group as a trumpet player.

To ready his music for live performance, he joined smaller pieces of music together into longer suites. Rather than single pieces, which would require the audience to applaud every few minutes, Morricone thought the best idea was to create a series of suites lasting from 15 to 20 minutes, which form a sort of symphony in various movements – alternating successful pieces with personal favourites. In concert, Morricone normally had 180 to 200 musicians and vocalists under his baton, performing multiple genre-crossing collections of music. Rock, symphonic and traditional indigenous instruments share the stage.

On 20 September 1984, Morricone conducted the Orchestre national des Pays de la Loire at Cinésymphonie '84 ("Première nuit de la musique de film/First night of film music") in the French concert hall Salle Pleyel in Paris. He performed some of his best-known compositions such as Metti una sera a cena, Novecento and The Good, the Bad and the Ugly. Michel Legrand and Georges Delerue performed on the same evening. On 15 October 1987 Morricone gave a concert in front of 12,000 people in the Sportpaleis in Antwerp, Belgium, with the Dutch Metropole Orchestra and the Italian operatic soprano Alide Maria Salvetta. A live-album with a recording of this concert was released in the same year.

On 9 June 2000, Morricone went to the Flanders International Film Festival Ghent to conduct his music together with the National Orchestra of Belgium. During the concert's first part, the screening of The Life and Death of King Richard III (1912) was accompanied by live music by Morricone. It was the very first time that the score was performed live in Europe. The second part of the evening consisted of an anthology of the composer's work. The event took place on the eve of Euro 2000, the European Football Championship in Belgium and the Netherlands.

Morricone performed over 250 concerts as of 2001. The composer started a world tour in 2001, the latter part sponsored by Giorgio Armani, with the Orchestra Roma Sinfonietta, touring London (Barbican 2001; 75th birthday Concerto, Royal Albert Hall 2003 with singer Dulce Pontes), Paris, Verona, and Tokyo. Morricone performed his classic film scores at the Gasteig in Munich in 2004.

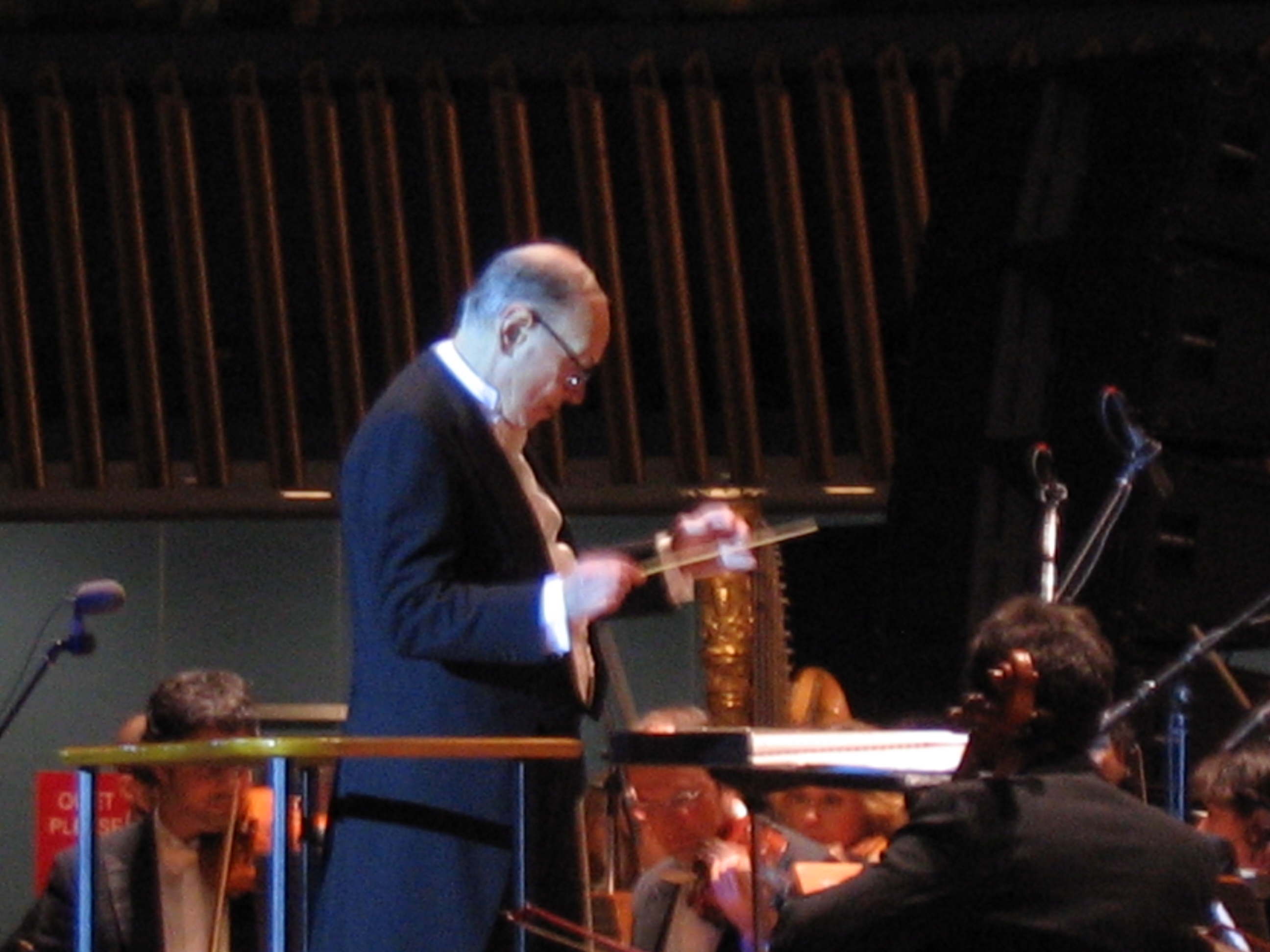
Morricone at the United Nations Headquarters

He made his North American concert debut on 3 February 2007 at Radio City Music Hall in New York City. The previous evening, Morricone had already presented at the United Nations a concert comprising some of his film themes, as well as the cantata Voci dal silenzio to welcome the new Secretary-General Ban Ki-Moon. A Los Angeles Times review bemoaned the poor acoustics and opined of Morricone: "His stick technique is adequate, but his charisma as a conductor is zero." On 26 February 2012, Morricone made his Australian concert debut when he conducted the Western Australian Youth Orchestra together with a 100 voice chorus (made up primarily of West Australian Symphony Orchestra chorus members) at the Burswood Theatre (part of Crown Perth in Perth. On 2 March 2012 he conducted the Adelaide Symphony Orchestra at Elder Park, Adelaide, as part of the Adelaide Festival of Arts. On 22 December 2012 Morricone conducted the 85-piece Belgian orchestra "Orkest der Lage Landen" and a 100-piece choir during a two-hour concert in the Sportpaleis in Antwerp.

In November 2013, Morricone began a world tour to coincide with the 50th anniversary of his film music career and performed in locations such as the Crocus City Hall in Moscow, Santiago, Chile, Berlin, Germany (O2 World, Germany), Budapest, Hungary, and Vienna (Stadthalle). Back in June 2014, Morricone had to cancel a US tour in New York (Barclays Center) and Los Angeles (Nokia Theatre LA Live) due to a back procedure on 20 February. Morricone postponed the rest of his world tour. In November 2014, Morricone stated that he would resume his European tour starting from February 2015 along with Dulce Pontes.

== Personal life ==
On 13 October 1956, Morricone married Maria Travia (born 31 December 1932), whom he had met in 1950. Travia wrote lyrics to complement her husband's pieces. Her works include the Latin texts for The Mission. Together, they had four children: Marco (b. 1957), Alessandra (b. 1961), conductor and film composer Andrea (b. 1964) and Giovanni (b. 1966), a filmmaker who lives in New York City. They remained married for 63 years until his death. Morricone lived in Italy his entire life and never desired to live in Hollywood. He described himself as a Christian leftist, stating that he voted for the Christian Democracy (DC) for more than 40 years, and then, after its dissolution in 1994, he approached the centre-left coalition, becoming also a founding member of the Democratic Party (PD) in 2007.

Morricone loved chess, having learned the game when he was 11. Before his musical career took off, he played in club tournaments in Rome in the mid-1950s. His first official tournament was in 1964, where he won a prize in the third category for amateurs. He was even coached by 12-time Italian champion IM Stefano Tatai for a while. Soon, he got too busy for chess, but he would always keep a keen interest in the game and estimated his peak Elo rating to be nearly 1700. Over the years, Morricone played chess with many big names including GMs Garry Kasparov, Anatoly Karpov, Judit Polgar, and Peter Leko. He once held GM Boris Spassky to a draw in a simultaneous competition with 27 players, where Morricone was the last one standing. On 6 July 2020, Morricone died at the Università Campus Bio-Medico in Rome, aged 91, as a result of injuries sustained to his femur during a fall. Following a private funeral in the hospital's chapel, he was entombed in Cimitero Laurentino.

== Influence ==
Morricone influenced many artists from other styles and genres, including Danger Mouse, Dire Straits, Muse, Metallica, Radiohead, and Hans Zimmer. Morricone's influence extends into the realm of pop music. Hugo Montenegro had a hit with a version of the main theme from The Good, the Bad and the Ugly in both the United Kingdom and the United States. This was followed by his album of Morricone's music in 1968. Morricone's film music was also recorded by many artists. John Zorn recorded an album of Morricone's music, The Big Gundown, with Keith Rosenberg in the mid-1980s. Morricone's Sergio Leone Suite of haunting melodies from the scores he composed for several of the films by Sergio Leone, and performed by Morricone, Roma Sinfonietta Orchestra, and Yo-Yo Ma on cello, was recorded by CBS/Sony (93456) and is featured on Classical radio stations such as the Sarasota, Florida, radio station WSMR.

Morricone collaborated with world music artists, such as Portuguese fado singer Dulce Pontes (in 2003 with Focus, an album praised by Paulo Coelho and where his songbook can be sampled) and virtuoso cellist Yo-Yo Ma (in 2004), who both recorded albums of Morricone classics with the Roma Sinfonietta Orchestra and Morricone himself conducting. The album Yo-Yo Ma Plays Ennio Morricone sold more than 130,000 copies in 2004. Metallica has used Morricone's "The Ecstasy of Gold" as an intro at their concerts since 1983 (shock jocks Opie and Anthony also used the song at the start of their XM Satellite Radio and CBS Radio shows.) The San Francisco Symphony Orchestra also played it on Metallica's live albums S&M and S&M2. The theme from A Fistful of Dollars is also used as a concert intro by The Mars Volta.

Morricone inspired the namesake of Morricone Youth, a New York band dedicated to playing music from film and television, founded by musician and radio host Devon E. Levins in 1999. In addition to composers like Lalo Schifrin and Jerry Goldsmith, the band has performed music from a large spectrum of Morricone's film career, ranging from his work in the spaghetti westerns to The Exorcist II, as well as original Morricone-inspired pieces. The Spaghetti Western Orchestra is an Australian tribute band that started in 2004. Radiohead drew inspiration from the recording style of Morricone for their 1997 album OK Computer. Singer and composer Mike Patton was heavily influenced by Morricone's more experimental oeuvre and in 2005 he commissioned a compilation album, Crime and Dissonance, of the lesser-known soundtracks by "E Maestro" that was released on his own Ipecac Recordings label. Gnarls Barkley's hit single "Crazy" (2006) was musically inspired by Morricone.

Muse cites Morricone as an influence for the songs "City of Delusion", "Hoodoo", and "Knights of Cydonia" on their 2006 album Black Holes and Revelations. The band went on to perform the song "Man with a Harmonica" live played by Chris Wolstenholme, as an intro to "Knights of Cydonia". In 2007, the tribute album We All Love Ennio Morricone was released, featuring performances by various artists, including Sarah Brightman, Andrea Bocelli, Celine Dion, Bruce Springsteen and Metallica. Alex Turner has noted Morricone's influence on his writing, in particular on The Last Shadow Puppets album The Age of the Understatement of 2008. "505" samples The Good, the Bad and the Ugly.

"Lovers on the Sun", a song released in 2014 by French music producer David Guetta, is influenced by Morricone's western scores. The Prodigy repurposed Morricone's score from 1966's La resa dei conti (Seconda Caccia) for The Big Gundown on 2009's Invaders Must Die. Anna Calvi has cited Morricone as an influence. Sea Girls' song "Lonely" was written on the day of Morricone's death and is influenced by his music, particularly on the film The Good, the Bad and the Ugly. It was released as a single in February 2022. Sabaton, known for their history based music, based their song on "Audie Murphy (To Hell and Back)" partly on Morricone's style, according to the band's singer.

PJ Harvey has said that Morricone's score for Guns for San Sebastian inspired the song "Telco" from her 1995 album To Bring You My Love.

== Discography ==
Morricone sold well over 70 million records worldwide during his career that spanned over seven decades, including 6.5 million albums and singles in France, over three million in the United States and more than two million albums in South Korea. In 1971, the composer received his first golden record (disco d'oro) for the sale of 1,000,000 records in Italy, and was awarded a "Targa d'Oro" (it) for the worldwide sales of 22 million.

Selected long-time collaborations with directors

Director	Period	No. of films	Film genre(s)	Film titles
Mauro Bolognini (1922–2001)	1967–1991	15	historical/drama/documentary	including Le streghe, L'assoluto naturale, Un bellissimo novembre, Metello, The Venetian Woman and Farewell Moscow
Alberto Negrin (1940–)	1987–2013	13	crime/historic/drama	including The Secret of the Sahara, Voyage of Terror: The Achille Lauro Affair and Il Cuore nel Pozzo
Giuseppe Tornatore (1956–)	1988–2016	13	historical/drama/documentary/advertising campaigns	including Cinema Paradiso, The Legend of 1900, Malèna, Baaria and The Best Offer
Giuliano Montaldo (1930–2023)	1967–2008	12	crime/historic/drama	including Grand Slam, Sacco & Vanzetti, A Dangerous Toy, Marco Polo and Tempo di uccidere
Luciano Salce (1922–1989)	1959–1966	11	comedy/drama/historical	including Il Federale, El Greco, Slalom and Come imparai ad amare le donne
Aldo Lado (1934–2023)	1971–1981	9	mystery/thriller	including Chi l'ha vista morire?, Sepolta viva, L'ultimo treno della notte and L'umanoide
Roberto Faenza (1943–)	1968–1995	8	crime/horror/historical	including Escalation, Si salvi chi vuole, Copkiller and Sostiene Pereira
Sergio Leone (1929–1989)	1964–1984	8	western/crime	including the Dollars Trilogy, Once Upon a Time in the West, Duck, You Sucker!, My Name Is Nobody and Once Upon a Time in America
Sergio Corbucci (1927–1990)	1966–1972	7	western/comedy	including Navajo Joe, The Hellbenders, The Mercenary, The Great Silence, Compañeros and Sonny and Jed
Alberto De Martino (1929–2015)	1966–1972	7	crime/war/horror	including Dirty Heroes, O.K. Connery and Holocaust 2000
Pier Paolo Pasolini (1922–1975)	1965–1975	7	mystery/historical	including The Hawks and the Sparrows, Teorema, The Decameron, The Canterbury Tales, Arabian Nights and Salò, or the 120 Days of Sodom
Elio Petri (1929–1982)	1968–1979	7	crime/horror/historical	including A Quiet Place in the Country, Investigation of a Citizen Above Suspicion, The Working Class Goes to Heaven and Todo modo
Dario Argento (1940–)	1968–1998	6	horror/gangster/thriller	including The Bird with the Crystal Plumage, The Cat o' Nine Tails, Four Flies on Grey Velvet, The Stendhal Syndrome and The Phantom of the Opera
Carlo Lizzani (1922–2013)	1965–1976	6	comedy/crime/drama	including Thrilling, Svegliati e uccidi, The Hills Run Red and San Babila-8 P.M.
Sergio Sollima (1921–2015)	1966–1973	6	western/crime/thriller	including The Big Gundown, Faccia a faccia, Run, Man, Run, Città violenta and Revolver
Henri Verneuil (1920–2002)	1968–1979	6	thriller/crime	La Bataille de San Sebastian, Le clan des siciliens, Le Casse, Le Serpent and Peur sur la ville
Giulio Petroni (1917–2010)	1968–1979	6	western/comedy	including Tepepa, A Sky Full of Stars for a Roof and Death Rides a Horse
Bernardo Bertolucci (1940–2018)	1964–1981	5	drama/historical	including Before the Revolution, Partner, Novecento and Tragedy of a Ridiculous Man
Pasquale Festa Campanile (1927–1986)	1967–1980	5	comedy/crime	including The Girl and the General, When Women Had Tails, Hitch-Hike and Il ladrone
Damiano Damiani (1922–2013)	1960–1975	5	drama/thriller/western	including The Most Beautiful Wife, The Case Is Closed, Forget It and A Genius, Two Partners and a Dupe
Quentin Tarantino (1963–)	2001–2015	6	action/thriller/western	Kill Bill, Death Proof, Inglourious Basterds, Django Unchained* and The Hateful Eight
Duccio Tessari (1926–1994)	1965–1990	5	western/action/adventure	including A Pistol for Ringo and The Return of Ringo

== Awards and honours ==
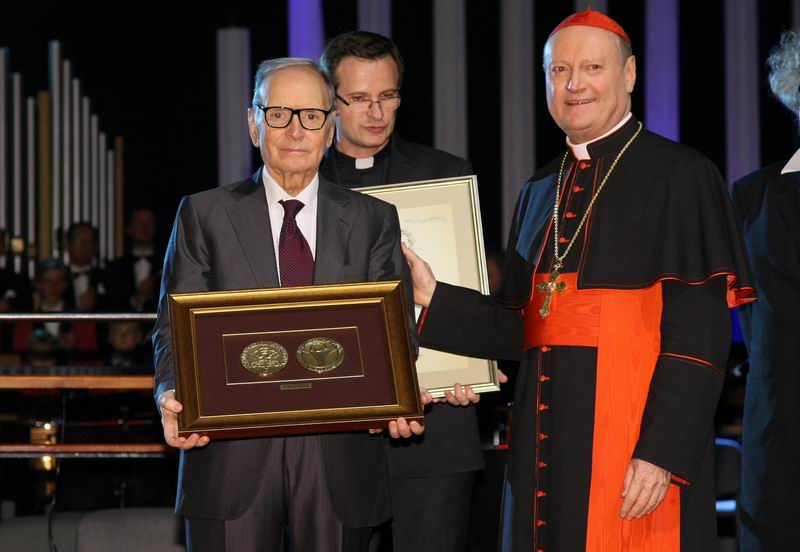
Morricone receives the Per Artem ad Deum Medal (English: "Through Arts to God") from Cardinal Gianfranco Ravasi.

Morricone received his first Academy Award nomination in 1979 for the score to Days of Heaven (Terrence Malick, 1978). He received his second Oscar nomination for The Mission. He also received Oscar nominations for his scores to The Untouchables (1987), Bugsy (1991), Malèna (2000), and The Hateful Eight (2016). In February 2016, Morricone won his first competitive Academy Award for his score to The Hateful Eight. Morricone and Alex North are the only composers to receive the Academy Honorary Award since its introduction in 1928. He received the award in February 2007, "for his magnificent and multifaceted contributions to the art of film music."

In 2005, four film scores by Ennio Morricone were nominated by the American Film Institute for an honoured place in the AFI's Top 25 of Best American Film Scores of All Time. His score for The Mission was ranked 23rd in the Top 25 list. Morricone was nominated seven times for a Grammy Award. In 2009 The Recording Academy inducted his score for The Good, the Bad, and the Ugly (1966) into the Grammy Hall of Fame. In 2010 Ennio Morricone and Icelandic singer Björk won the Polar Music Prize. The Polar Music Prize is Sweden's biggest music award and is typically shared by a pop artist and a classical musician. It was founded by Stig Anderson, manager of Swedish pop group ABBA, in 1989. A Variety poll of 40 top current film composers selected The Mission as the greatest film score of all time.

In 1971, Morricone received a "Targa d'Oro" for worldwide sales of 22 million, and by 2016 Morricone had sold more than 70 million records worldwide. In 2007, he received the Academy Honorary Award "for his magnificent and multifaceted contributions to the art of film music". He was nominated for a further six Oscars, and in 2016, received his only competitive Academy Award for his score to Quentin Tarantino's film The Hateful Eight, at the time becoming the oldest person ever to win a competitive Oscar. His other achievements include three Grammy Awards, three Golden Globes, six BAFTAs, ten David di Donatello, eleven Nastro d'Argento, two European Film Awards, the Golden Lion Honorary Award, and the Polar Music Prize in 2010. The soundtrack for The Mission (1986) was certified gold in the United States. The album Yo-Yo Ma Plays Ennio Morricone stayed for 105 weeks on the Billboard Top Classical Albums.

== Sources ==
- Morricone, Ennio; De Rosa, Alessandro (2019). Ennio Morricone: In His Own Words. Ennio Morricone in Conversation with Alessandro De Rosa. Translated by Maurizio Corbella. Oxford University Press. ISBN 978-0-19-068103-6.
