= Antonina Krzysztoń =

Polish singer-songwriter

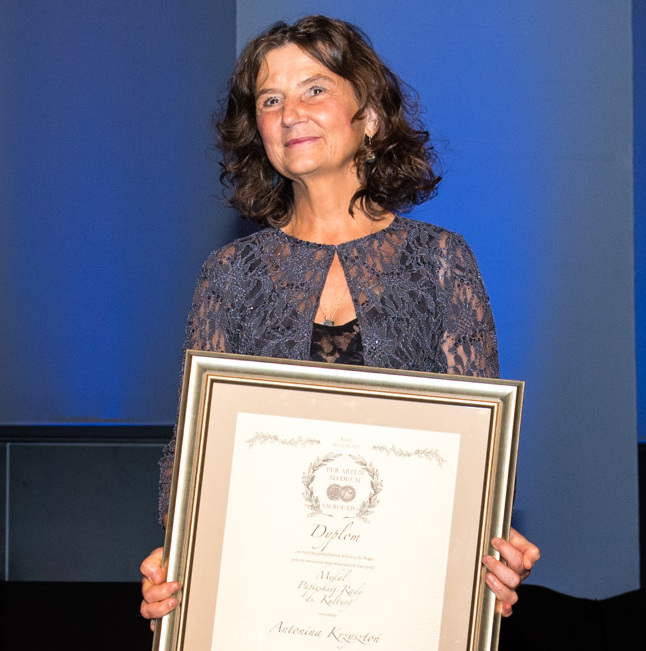
Antonina Krzysztoń received the Per Artem ad Deum Medal in 2016

Antonina Krzysztoń (born 13 June 1954 in Kraków, Poland) is a Polish singer-songwriter.

On 3 May 2006 the Polish President, Lech Kaczyński, awarded her the Officer's Cross of the Order of Polonia Restituta.

== Discography ==
- 1990 Inne światy
- 1992 Pieśni postne
- 1993 Takie moje wędrowanie
- 1995 Czas bez skarg
- 1996 Kiedy przyjdzie dzień
- 1998 Każda chwila
- 2000 Wołanie
- 2000 Złota kolekcja "Perłowa Łódź"
- 2004 Dwa księżyce
