= Orchestra Roma Sinfonietta =

Roma Sinfonietta Orchestra is an Italian orchestra founded in 1993, which began a collaboration with the University of Rome Tor Vergata. Since 1995, the orchestra is best known for its key role in bringing to life the music of Ennio Morricone during his live performances and on Morricone’s film scores.

== Biography ==
The orchestra toured in Norway with soprano Elizabeth Norberg-Schulz and has worked with artists such as Michael Nyman, Quincy Jones, Roger Waters, Dulce Pontes, Michael Bolton, Andrea Bocelli, Nicola Piovani, Luis Bacalov and Gianni Ferrio.

The performances with Ennio Morricone as conductor took place in the largest and most prestigious theaters in the world such as the Auditorium Lingotto in Turin, Greek Theatre, Taormina, Teatro Massimo of Palermo, Nuovo Piccolo Teatro of Milan and Mazda Palace, Arena of Verona Piazza del Quirinale, Piazza del Campidoglio, Basilica Ara Coeli, Auditorium Parco della Musica Auditorium Conciliazione in Rome, Barbican Centre and Royal Albert Hall in London, the Palais des congrès de Paris, Tokyo International Forum, Osaka Festival Hall, Odeon of Herodes Atticus in Athens, United Nations Headquarters, Radio City Music Hall in New York City, and the Olympic Gymnasium in Seoul.

From 1998 until his death, Morricone used the orchestra for the recording of film scores such as The Phantom of the Opera, La Sconosciuta and Baaria.

== Selected discography ==
- Luis Bacalov – Anni Ribelli Original Soundtrack (1994)
- Ennio Morricone – Concerto Premio Rota – live album (1995)
- Ennio Morricone - Film Music By Ennio Morricone (1996)
- Ennio Morricone – La Lupa (She-Wolf) (1996)
- Angelo Branduardi - Il dito e la luna (1998)
- Piero Piccioni, Gianni Ferrio - Incontri proibiti (1998)
- Ennio Morricone – The Phantom of the Opera (1998)
- Andrea Morricone – Liberty Heights (1999)
- Gianni Ferrio - E Meno Male Che C'E' Maria (2001)
- Ornella Vanoni - E Poi la Tua Bocca Da Bacciare (2001)
- Roberto Gatto - Roberto Gatto Plays Rugantino (2001)
- Ennio Morricone - Ripley's Game (2002)
- Ennio Morricone - Perlasca (2002)
- Ennio Morricone - Ennio Morricone: A Celebration of Ennio Morricone's 75th Anniversary (2002)
- Ennio Morricone – Senso '45 (2002)
- Ennio Morricone - Un difetto di famiglia (2002)
- Ennio Morricone - La luz prodigiosa (2003)
- Ennio Morricone - Dulce Pontes - Focus (2003)
- Ennio Morricone - Io, Ennio Morricone: Film Music (2003)
- Ennio Morricone - A Celebration of Ennio Morricone's 75th Anniversary (2004)
- Ennio Morricone - Arena Concerto (2004)
- Ennio Morricone – Focus (2004)
- Yo-Yo Ma - Sounds of Yo-Yo Ma (2004)
- Yo-Yo Ma, Ennio Morricone– Yo-Yo Ma Plays Ennio Morricone (2004)
- Ennio Morricone - Ennio Morricone: Itinerary of a Genius (2005)
- Yo-Yo Ma - The Essential Yo-Yo Ma (2005)
- Ennio Morricone - E ridendo l'uccise (2005)
- Ennio Morricone - Lucia (2005)
- Ennio Morricone - Karol: A Man Who Became Pope (2005)
- Ennio Morricone - Cefalonia (2005)
- Ennio Morricone - Il Cuore nel Pozzo(2005)
- Ennio Morricone - Karol: The Pope, The Man (2006)
- Ennio Morricone - La Sconosciuta (2006)
- Ennio Morricone - Gino Bartali, l'intramontabile (2006)
- Ennio Morricone - La provincial (2006)
- Ennio Morricone - Carel Kraayenhof– Guardians Of The Clouds (2006)
- Nicola Piovani - La Cantata dei Cent'anni (2006)
- Claudio Baglioni - Quelli degli altri tutti qui (2006)
- Ennio Morricone - Tutte le donne della mia vita (2007)
- Yo-Yo Ma – Appassionato (2007)
- Various – We All Love Ennio Morricone (2007)
- Ennio Morricone - Ennio Morricone: Arena Concerto (2007)
- Ennio Morricone - Risoluzione 819 (2008)
- Amedeo Minghi - 40 anni di me con voi (2008)
- Laura Pausini – Primavera In Anticipo (2008)
- Ennio Morricone - Peace Notes: Live in Venice [1 DVD/2 CD] (2008)
- Carmen Consoli – Elettra
- Ennio Morricone – Baaria (2009)
- Mina - Sulla tua bocca lo dirò (2009)
- Marcelo Álvarez – Tenorissimo (2010)
- Jovanotti - Baciami Ancora (2010)
- Pasquale Catalano – Barney's Version (2011)
- Jovanotti - Lorenzo In Concerto Per Jovanotti E Orchestra (2012)
- Hayley Westenra & Ennio Morricone – Paradiso (2012)
- Ennio Morricone - The Best Offer (2013)
- Mina - Christmas Song Book (2013)
