= Revolver (1973 film) =

- Italian film poster
- Directed by: Sergio Sollima
- Screenplay by: Arduino Maiuri; Massimo De Rita; Sergio Sollima
- Story by: Arduino Maiuri; Massimo De Rita; Sergio Sollima
- Produced by: Ugo Santalucia
- Starring: Oliver Reed; Fabio Testi; Agostina Belli; Paola Pitagora; Frédéric de Pasquale; Marc Mazza; Bernard Giraudeau; Daniel Beretta
- Cinematography: Aldo Scavarda
- Edited by: Sergio Montanari
- Music by: Ennio Morricone
- Production companies: Mega Film; Societe Nouvelle de Cinematographie; Dieter Gessler Film Produktion
- Distributed by: Panta
- Release date: September 27, 1973 (Italy)
- Running time: 115 minutes
- Countries: Italy; West Germany; France
- Box office: ₤477.374 million

Revolver (also titled Blood in the Streets and In the Name of Love) is a 1973 poliziottesco film directed by Sergio Sollima. It stars Oliver Reed and Fabio Testi.

== Plot ==
An Italian prison official's wife is kidnapped, and the kidnappers demand that a notorious prisoner be released in order for the man to get his wife back. He gets the man released - but then kidnaps him himself, in order to ensure that the man's colleagues do not kill his wife. Enraged, the gang sets out to free their compatriot and kill the man who took him.

== Cast ==
- Oliver Reed as Vito Cipriani
- Fabio Testi as Milo Ruiz
- Agostina Belli as Anna Cipriani
- Paola Pitagora as Carlotta
- Daniel Beretta as Al Niko
- Frédéric de Pasquale as Michel Granier
- Marc Mazza as Bald Police Inspector
- Reinhard Kolldehoff as French Lawyer
- Bernard Giraudeau as Sicilian Kidnapper
- Peter Berling as Grappa
- Alexander Stephan (as Gunnar Warner) as Jean-Daniel Auger
- Calisto Calisti as Maresciallo Fantuzzi
- Steffen Zacharias as Joe Le Corse
- Michel Bardinet as French Policeman
- Salvatore Borghese as Suicidal Prisoner
- Giovanni Pallavicino as Sicilian Kidnapper
- Marco Mariani as Carlo DeGregori
- Jean Degrave as Harmakolas
- Franco Moraldi as French Police Chief
- Ottavio Fanfani as Shopkeeper
- Gianni Bortolotto as Doctor

== Production ==
Paola Pitagora recalls how Oliver Reed always turned up drunk on set (something confirmed by director Sollima) and as a result there were often difficulties during filming - including an incident in which Reed 'under the influence' crashed a VW bus into a post and Paola Pitagora, who hit her face inside the vehicle, had to wear big sunshades for the rest of the filming to cover up her bruised eyes.

== Release ==
Revolver was released in Italy on September 27, 1973 where it was distributed theatrically by Panta. The film grossed 477,374,000 Italian lire in Italy.

== Legacy ==
The film's theme, "Un Amico", was scored by Ennio Morricone and was also featured in Quentin Tarantino's 2009 film Inglourious Basterds.
