= Canone inverso =

2000 Italian drama film

- Directed by: Ricky Tognazzi
- Produced by: Vittorio Cecchi Gori
- Starring: Hans Matheson; Mélanie Thierry; Lee Williams; Gabriel Byrne
- Cinematography: Fabio Cianchetti
- Edited by: Carla Simoncelli
- Music by: Ennio Morricone
- Release date: 2000
- Running time: 107 minutes
- Country: Italy
- Language: English

Canone inverso – Making Love, also known as The Inverse Canon, is a 2000 Italian drama film directed by Ricky Tognazzi. It is based on the 1996 novel Canone Inverso by the Italian author Paolo Maurensig.

The plot concerns how a distinctive violin with an anthropomorphic carved scroll changed hands, the friendship of two young violinists, and the love of one of them for a concert pianist. The film opens at the time of the Prague Spring, but the main events take place prior to World War II in Czechoslovakia.

Although an Italian production, the film is entirely in English, and involves anglophone, Italian and French actors.

Variety noted that "Performances generally are fine, with Matheson and Williams bringing plenty of vigor and spirit, and Thierry [...] supplying some delicate grace notes".

== Plot ==
At an auction a young woman, Costanza, is outbid for an old violin and pursues the successful bidder, an old man, outside, explaining why she wanted it so much. She recounts how, two years previously in 1968 during the Prague Spring, she was in a pub with friends when a man entered and insisted on playing his violin for her. The young woman, who does not know her parents, recalled the tune somehow from her childhood; she ran after the violinist, who told her his name was Jeno Varga and recounted the story of two boys who met in the late 1930s, at a music academy in Prague. The boys, David Blau from a rich background and Jeno, became close friends. Jeno grew up on a poor farm with his mother and step-father; his father had abandoned wife and son, but left them a rare violin and the music of a 'canone inverso'.

Jeno, who has heard the married, French concert pianist Sophie Levi on the radio tries to contact her. After his mother dies in childbirth he returns to Prague and finds Sophie again, telling her of his passion for music, and, discovering their mutual attraction, she eventually helps him secure a place at a strict music school there, where he and David become great friends.

At a special New Year's dinner in 1939 at the academy, the guest of honour is Sophie Levi; the director announces the auditions for a principal violin to play alongside Sophie in a public concert. As the professor Weigel leaves the jury during the auditions (making it inquorate) the two candidates left are Jeno and David, but Nazis arrive at the college and dismiss director Hischbaum and all those students of Jewish origin, including David. To remain with his friend, Jeno hits Weigel and gets expelled, and is invited by David to his palatial home. On arrival David shows Jeno the gallery of ancestral portraits – from which David admires only one, of a woman named Costanza. David's mood darkens when he sees Jeno's original violin and this turns to resentment as he recognizes the instrument which his father claimed to have lost during the Great War. The next day Hischbaum arrives at the Blau residence to finish the audition.

David chooses the duet of the reverse canon that Jeno also knows. Shortly the boys realize that they are half-brothers, but following his rejection by David, Jeno goes to play in the concert with Sophie, who was supposed to be fleeing Czechoslovakia because of anti-Semitic laws, but returns for the concert, abandoning her husband at the station. Before the concert, in the dressing room, Jeno and Sophie make love. During the concert, David arrives with the precious violin, but the SS enter and arrest all the Jewish musicians, including Jeno and Sophie.

Back in 1968 in Prague Jeno and Costanza witness the arrival of Soviet bloc tanks; he flees into the night leaving her with the violin. Costanza knows that Sophie died in a concentration camp but that she had a child and wonders if it is her. (In a concentration camp, Jeno is seen playing the canon next to the barbed wire, which Sophie and their daughter Costanza hear.) The old man is Baron Blau and he explains that in his grief at the loss of his half-brother David had taken Jeno's name. Baron Blau and Costanza return to the ruined Blau mansion where they find Jeno/David.

== Cast ==
- Hans Matheson as Jeno Varga
- Mélanie Thierry as Sophie Levi
- Gabriel Byrne as The Violinist
- Lee Williams as David Blau
- Ricky Tognazzi as Baron Blau
- Peter Vaughan as Old Baron Blau
- Domiziana Giordano as Baronessa Blau
- Nia Roberts as Costanza
- Adriano Pappalardo as Wolf, Jeno's stepfather
- Rachel Shelley as Jeno's mother
- Andy Luotto as Master Hischbaum
- Ivo Niederle as Professor Hoffmann
- Mattia Sbragia as Master Weigel
- Andrea Prodan as Karl, Sophie's husband
- Dagmar Bláhová as Sophie's secretary
- Gregory Harrison as Young Jeno

== Production ==
Filming took place in 1999 and used many locations in the Czech Republic, including the Charles Bridge (for scenes with Costanza by the river) and the Praha hlavní nádraží station in Prague (for Sophie's putative departure), the city of Plzeň, and the spa town of Mariánské Lázně (for the first encounter of Jeno and Sophie).

The film was released In Italy (dubbed in Italian) in spring 2000, and then had its original English-language premiere in the Cannes market. DVD issues have been made subsequently.

== Music and Soundtrack ==
A canon is where a melody is closely imitated by a second voice (or part) which begins after the first part or voice; the 'canone inverso' is where the “imitating voice gives out the melody backwards (the two voices usually beginning together, and so departing from the usual idea of canon)".

Music is central to the film and used both as soundtrack and diegetic and the film culminates in the performance of a piano and violin concerto, Concerto Romantico Interrotto by Italian film composer Ennio Morricone who also wrote the soundtrack. Other composers featured are Paganini (his Caprice No.9 'La Caccia'), Bach (Ciaconna) and Dvořák (from Songs my mother taught me). Debussy's Clair de lune is arranged for piano by Morricone.

== Awards ==
The film won five David di Donatello Awards (Best Cinematography, Best Editing, Best Production Design, Best Score and a special "Scuola David Award") and three Silver Ribbons (Best Cinematography, Best Editing and Best Score). The film won the Best Feature Film award and Audience Award for Best Feature at the 2001 Newport Beach Film Festival.
