= We All Love Ennio Morricone =

Compilation album by Various Artists
- Released: February 19, 2007
- Label: Sony

Professional ratings
Review scores
Source	Rating
AllMusic	3/5 stars

We All Love Ennio Morricone is a 2007 tribute album honoring noted film composer Ennio Morricone. It features a diverse lineup of artists including Andrea Bocelli, Metallica, Bruce Springsteen, Roger Waters, and Celine Dion. Also, industry giant Quincy Jones, an admirer of Morricone's work as a composer for many years, enlisted his longtime songwriting collaborators Alan and Marilyn Bergman to write the lyrics to "I Knew I Loved You", which Dion sang to Morricone's "Deborah's Theme" from Once Upon a Time in America. Bruce Springsteen won the Grammy Award Best Rock Instrumental Performance for his version of "Once Upon A Time In The West", beating out Metallica who was nominated for their cover of "The Ecstasy of Gold", also from this album. The album sold over 120,000 copies in Italy alone.

== Track listing ==
1. "I Knew I Loved You" - Celine Dion
2. "The Good, The Bad and The Ugly" - Quincy Jones featuring Herbie Hancock
3. "Once Upon a Time in the West" - Bruce Springsteen
4. "Conradiana" - Andrea Bocelli
5. "The Ecstasy of Gold" - Metallica
6. "Maléna" - Yo-Yo Ma
7. "Come Sail Away" - Renée Fleming
8. "Gabriel's Oboe" - Ennio Morricone
9. "Conmigo" - Daniela Mercury featuring Eumir Deodato
10. "La Luz Prodigiosa" - Dulce Pontes
11. "Love Affair" - Chris Botti
12. "Je Changerais d'Avis" - Vanessa and the O's
13. "Lost Boys Calling" - Roger Waters
14. "The Tropical Variation" - Ennio Morricone
15. "Could Heaven Be" - Denyce Graves
16. "Addio Monti" - Taro Hakase
17. "Cinema Paradiso" - Ennio Morricone

== Personnel ==
=== Metallica (track 5) ===
- James Hetfield - lead guitar, vocals
- Kirk Hammett - rhythm guitar
- Lars Ulrich - drums
- Robert Trujillo - bass
- Mike Gillies - recording, mixing
