= The Ecstasy of Gold =

Song by Ennio Morricone

from the album The Good, the Bad and the Ugly
- Released: 1966
- Genre: Film score, western
- Length: 3:22
- Songwriter: Ennio Morricone

"The Ecstasy of Gold" (Italian: "L'estasi dell'oro") is a musical composition by Ennio Morricone, part of his score for the 1966 Sergio Leone film The Good, the Bad and the Ugly. It is played while Tuco (Eli Wallach) is frantically searching a cemetery for the grave that holds $200,000 in gold coins (equivalent to $6,000,000 in 2025). It is sung by Edda Dell'Orso.

== Appearances in other media ==
- Opening cover number on live album S&M (album) by Metallica, Michael Kamen, and San Francisco Symphony
- An instrumental metal cover by Metallica appears on the 2007 Morricone tribute album We All Love Ennio Morricone. It reached #21 on Billboard's Mainstream Rock charts and was nominated for a Grammy Award in the category of Best Rock Instrumental Performance. The band has used the original soundtrack recording to open their concerts since 1983.
- Jay-Z sampled the beat in his song "Blueprint 2" on his 2002 album The Blueprint²: The Gift & the Curse.
- The main melody and vocals are sampled in the 2022 glitch hop song "Ecstasy of Soul" by electronic artists Zeds Dead and GRiZ. The song peaked at #19 on the US Dance/Electronic Songs chart.
- A number of brands use the composition in their onscreen advertising include Dolce & Gabbana, Lamborghini, Rolex, Nike, KFC, H & M, and Modelo.
- The song is used in the opening sequence to the 2006 film Jackass Number Two.
- A cover was done by Gustavo Santaolalla for the 2014 animated film The Book of Life.
- The song made an appearance during a speech given by Spongebob in the 2015 film The SpongeBob Movie: Sponge Out of Water.
