= Dollars Trilogy =

1964–1966 Western films directed by Sergio Leone

- Blu-ray box set cover
- Directed by: Sergio Leone
- Produced by: Arrigo Colombo (1); Giorgio Papi (1); Alberto Grimaldi (2–3)
- Starring: Clint Eastwood; Mario Brega; Gian Maria Volonté (1–2); Lee Van Cleef (2–3); Marianne Koch (1); Eli Wallach (3)
- Cinematography: Massimo Dallamano (1–2); Tonino Delli Colli (3)
- Edited by: Roberto Cinquini (1); Eugenio Alabiso (2–3); Giorgio Serrallonga (2); Nino Baragli (3)
- Music by: Ennio Morricone
- Production companies: Constantin Film; Jolly Film (1); Ocean Films (1); Produzioni Europee Associati (PEA) (2–3); Arturo González Producciones Cinematográficas (2–3); United Artists (3)
- Distributed by: Unidis (Italy, 1); PEA (Italy, 2–3); United Artists (US & UK)
- Release dates: 1964 (1); 1965 (2); 1966 (3)
- Countries: Italy; West Germany; Spain
- Languages: English; Italian; Spanish
- Budget: US$2–2.025 million
- Box office: US$84.3 million

The Dollars Trilogy (Italian: Trilogia del dollaro), also known as the Man with No Name Trilogy (Italian: Trilogia dell'Uomo senza nome), is an Italian film series consisting of three spaghetti Western films directed by Sergio Leone. The films are titled A Fistful of Dollars (1964), For a Few Dollars More (1965) and The Good, the Bad and the Ugly (1966). Their English versions were distributed by United Artists, while the Italian ones were distributed by Unidis and PEA.

The series has become known for establishing the spaghetti western genre, and inspiring the creation of many more spaghetti western films. The three films are consistently listed among the best-rated Western films in history.

The three films came to be considered a trilogy following the exploits of the same so-called "Man with No Name", portrayed by Clint Eastwood. The "Man with No Name" concept was invented by the American distributor United Artists, looking for a strong angle to sell the films as a trilogy. As such, the three films are connected thematically rather than through a continuous narrative and there is little continuity between the three films. However, it is established that the films are set in reverse chronological order (Note: A Fistful of Dollars has a grave marker in the cemetery dated 1873, For A Few Dollars More has Colonel Douglas Mortimer, who is a veteran of the Civil War, while The Good, The Bad and The Ugly takes place during the Civil War.). Eastwood's characters in all the films have names: "Joe", "Manco" and "Blondie", respectively.

== Films ==
=== A Fistful of Dollars (Per un pugno di dollari, 1964) ===
The first film has the Man with No Name arriving in the Mexico–United States border town of San Miguel, the base of two rival smuggling families, the Rojos and the Baxters. The Man with No Name, referred to by the old undertaker Piripero as "Joe", plays them against each other by collecting prizes for giving information, capturing prisoners and killing men, while also helping a woman, her husband and their son, held captive by the ruthless Ramón Rojo, to escape. He is discovered by the Rojos and tortured, but escapes. The Rojos massacre the unarmed Baxters while searching for him, but helped by Piripero he hides away from the town. The Man with No Name returns as the Rojos are preparing to hang the local innkeeper, Silvanito, who had befriended him. He kills Don Miguel Rojo, uses his last bullet to free Silvanito, and kills Ramón in a gunslinging duel. After the last remaining Rojo brother, Esteban, is killed by Silvanito while trying to shoot from a window, the Man with No Name departs from the now-peaceful town.

=== For a Few Dollars More (Per qualche dollaro in più, 1965) ===
The second film introduces the Man with No Name, nicknamed "Manco", as a bounty hunter killing bandits for money, and Colonel Douglas Mortimer, a bounty hunter hunting for the same criminals. Both searching for the psychopathic Mexican bandit known as "El Indio" who escaped from jail, they rival each other, but realize that to kill him, they must work together. Manco infiltrates El Indio's gang, while Mortimer acts from the outside. Manco discovers El Indio's elaborate plot to rob the Bank of El Paso, and is forced to take part in it, being careful to avoid wounding innocents. El Indio transfers his gang to Agua Caliente, Mexico, where Manco and Mortimer attempt to steal the money to take it back to the Bank. El Indio discovers their plot but lets them escape as part of an operation to murder all but one of his associates, to split the money in two instead of with the entire gang. Battle ensues between the bounty hunters and the bandits, as the two kill all of them, although the one El Indio meant to spare is killed. Manco discovers that Mortimer's hunt for El Indio is personal and lets him kill the bandit in a duel. Mortimer refuses to take any money and rides away. Manco piles the bandit corpses in a horse-drawn cart and rides away with the stolen bank money to collect his bounty earnings.

=== The Good, the Bad and the Ugly (Il buono, il brutto, il cattivo, 1966) ===
In the third film, set during the American Civil War, Mexican bandit Tuco Ramírez and the Man with No Name, whom Tuco calls "Blondie", work together to scam small towns. Blondie collects the bounties on Tuco and then frees him as he is about to be hanged. A mercenary, "Angel Eyes", is searching for a man named "Jackson", who has stolen $200,000 from the Confederate Army. Angel Eyes threatens the family of one of Jackson's former accomplices and learns that Jackson goes under the alias of "Bill Carson", who has murdered both of his original accomplices. The partnership between Blondie and Tuco sours when Tuco complains that being repeatedly placed in a noose with only a single bullet standing between himself and death demands a larger cut than 50/50. Blondie betrays Tuco, but is caught and tortured by Tuco, who tries to put Blondie in a noose, but the raging war encroaches and drives them apart. Tuco catches Blondie and drags him through the desert. Tuco's revenge is interrupted when they stumble upon a Confederate carriage carrying the bullet-riddled and barely-alive Carson. Bleeding and desperate for water, Carson tells Tuco the name of the cemetery in which the gold is hidden, but while Tuco goes to get water, Blondie crawls past and gets the name of the grave in which the treasure is buried just as Carson dies. Tuco realizes that he cannot find the bounty without Blondie, and the two form an alliance. During their journey to the treasure, they are arrested by Union Army soldiers and taken to a prison camp where Angel Eyes is posing as a Sergeant. Angel Eyes tortures Tuco into revealing his half of the secret and recruits Blondie to show him the grave. All three leave the prison. Blondie, Tuco, and Angel Eyes commence a game of betrayal and subterfuge. Tuco and Blondie are blocked by the warring Union and Confederates. Blondie tricks Tuco into revealing the name of the cemetery. The gunslingers arrive at the graveyard where the treasure is hidden, but find themselves in a three-way standoff. Blondie takes up a burnt-ended cigar and a rock and tells the others that he will write the name of the grave marker on the bottom of a stone. He places the stone in the middle of the cemetery and a duel begins. After the duel, Blondie takes his half of the money, then forces Tuco to hang himself in a noose, balancing on an unstable wooden cross on a grave. After riding a fair distance, Blondie frees him by shooting his rope with a rifle. Afterwards Blondie rides further, while Tuco is cursing him.

== Development ==
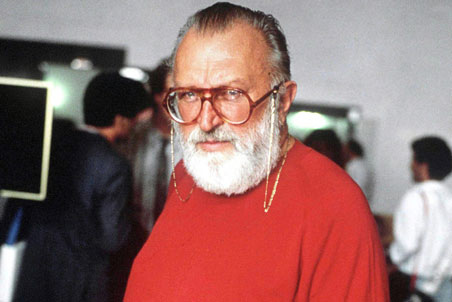
Director Sergio Leone

A Fistful of Dollars is an unofficial remake of Akira Kurosawa's 1961 film Yojimbo starring Toshiro Mifune, which resulted in a successful lawsuit by Toho.

=== Cast ===
The actors who appear in all three films are Eastwood, Mario Brega, Aldo Sambrell, Benito Stefanelli and Lorenzo Robledo. Four actors appear twice in the trilogy, playing different characters: Lee Van Cleef, Gian Maria Volonté, Luigi Pistilli, and Joseph Egger.

=== Music ===
Composer Ennio Morricone provided the original music score for all three films, although in A Fistful of Dollars he was credited either as "Dan Savio" or "Leo Nichols", depending on the print.

== Principal cast ==
Actor	Films		
Actor	A Fistful of Dollars (1964)	For a Few Dollars More (1965)	The Good, the Bad and the Ugly (1966)
Clint Eastwood	Man with No Name	Man with No Name	Man with No Name
Clint Eastwood	Joe	Manco ("Il Monco")	Blondie ("Il Biondo")
Mario Brega	Chico	Niño	Corporal Wallace
Aldo Sambrell	Manolo	Cuchillo	Angel Eyes Gang Member
Benito Stefanelli	Rubio	Hughie (a.k.a. "Luke")	Angel Eyes Gang Member
Lorenzo Robledo	Baxter's member	Tomaso	Clem
Joseph Egger	Piripero	Old Prophet ("Vecchio Profeta")	
Gian Maria Volonté	Ramón Rojo	El Indio	
Marianne Koch	Marisol		
Lee Van Cleef		Colonel Douglas Mortimer	Angel Eyes ("Sentenza")
Luigi Pistilli		Groggy	Father Pablo Ramirez
Román Ariznavarreta		Half-Shaved Bounty Hunter	Bounty Hunter
Antonio Molino Rojo		Frisco	Captain Harper
Antoñito Ruiz		Fernando	Stevens' Youngest son
José Terrón		Guy Calloway	Thomas 'Shorty' Larson
Eli Wallach			Tuco Ramirez

== Crew ==
Role		Film		
Role		A Fistful of Dollars (1964)	For a Few Dollars More (1965)	The Good, the Bad and the Ugly (1966)
Director		Sergio Leone	Sergio Leone	Sergio Leone
Producer		Arrigo Colombo; Giorgio Papi	Alberto Grimaldi	Alberto Grimaldi
Writer	Screenplay	Sergio Leone; Víctor Andrés Catena; Jaime Comas Gil; Fernando Di Leo; Duccio Tessari; Tonino Valerii	Sergio Leone; Luciano Vincenzoni; Sergio Donati	Sergio Leone; Luciano Vincenzoni; Age & Scarpelli; Sergio Donati
Writer	Story	Akira Kurosawa; Ryūzō Kikushima (Yojimbo)	Sergio Leone; Fulvio Morsella; Enzo Dell'Aquila; Fernando Di Leo	Sergio Leone; Luciano Vincenzoni
Writer	English Dialogue	Mark Lowell; Clint Eastwood	Luciano Vincenzoni	Mickey Knox
Music	Composer	Ennio Morricone	Ennio Morricone	Ennio Morricone
Music	Director	Ennio Morricone	Bruno Nicolai	Bruno Nicolai
Cinematographer		Massimo Dallamano	Massimo Dallamano	Tonino Delli Colli
Editor		Roberto Cinquini	Eugenio Alabiso; Giorgio Serrallonga	Eugenio Alabiso; Nino Baragli
Set and costume designer		Carlo Simi	Carlo Simi	Carlo Simi

== Reception ==
=== Critical reception ===
A Fistful of Dollars earned a 98% rating on Rotten Tomatoes and a 65 on Metacritic.

For a Few Dollars More earned a 92% rating on Rotten Tomatoes and a 74 on Metacritic.

The Good, the Bad and the Ugly earned a 97% rating on Rotten Tomatoes and a 90 on Metacritic.

=== Box office performance ===
Film	Year	Box office gross revenue				Budget
Film	Year	Italy	US & Canada	Elsewhere	Worldwide	Budget
A Fistful of Dollars	1964	L. 2,700,000,000 ($4,400,000)	$14,500,000	$1,000,000	$19,900,000	$200,000–$225,000
For a Few Dollars More	1965	L. 3,100,000,000 ($5,000,000)	$15,000,000	$5,500,000	$25,500,000	$600,000
The Good, the Bad and the Ugly	1966	$6,300,000	$25,100,000	$7,500,000	$38,900,000	$1,200,000
Totals		$15,700,000	$54,600,000	$14,000,000	$84,300,000	$2,000,000–$2,025,000

Film	Box office admissions				
Film	Italy	United States & Canada	France & Spain	Germany	Combined
A Fistful of Dollars	14,797,275	15,591,000	7,665,321	3,281,990	41,335,586
For a Few Dollars More	14,543,161	13,761,000	9,691,900	3,072,010	41,068,071
The Good, the Bad and the Ugly	11,364,221	21,271,000	10,520,467	1,250,000	44,405,688
Totals	40,704,657	50,623,000	27,877,688	7,604,000	126,809,345

=== Accolades ===
Film	Award	Category	Recipients	Result
A Fistful of Dollars	Italian National Syndicate of Film Journalists	Best Score	Ennio Morricone	Won
A Fistful of Dollars	Italian National Syndicate of Film Journalists	Best Supporting Actor	Gian Maria Volonté	Nominated
The Good, the Bad and the Ugly	Laurel Awards	Action Performance	Clint Eastwood	Runner-Up
The Good, the Bad and the Ugly	Grammy Awards	2009 Grammy Hall of Fame Award	Ennio Morricone	Won

== Music ==
=== Soundtracks ===
Title	U.S. release date	Length	Composer(s)	Label
A Fistful of Dollars: Original Motion Picture Soundtrack	1964	TBA	Ennio Morricone	TBA
For a Few Dollars More: Original Motion Picture Soundtrack	1965	TBA	Ennio Morricone	TBA
The Good, The Bad and The Ugly: Original Motion Picture Soundtrack	1966	TBA	Ennio Morricone	TBA

=== Singles ===
- "The Good, the Bad and the Ugly"
- "The Story of a Soldier"
- "The Ecstasy of Gold"

== Literature ==
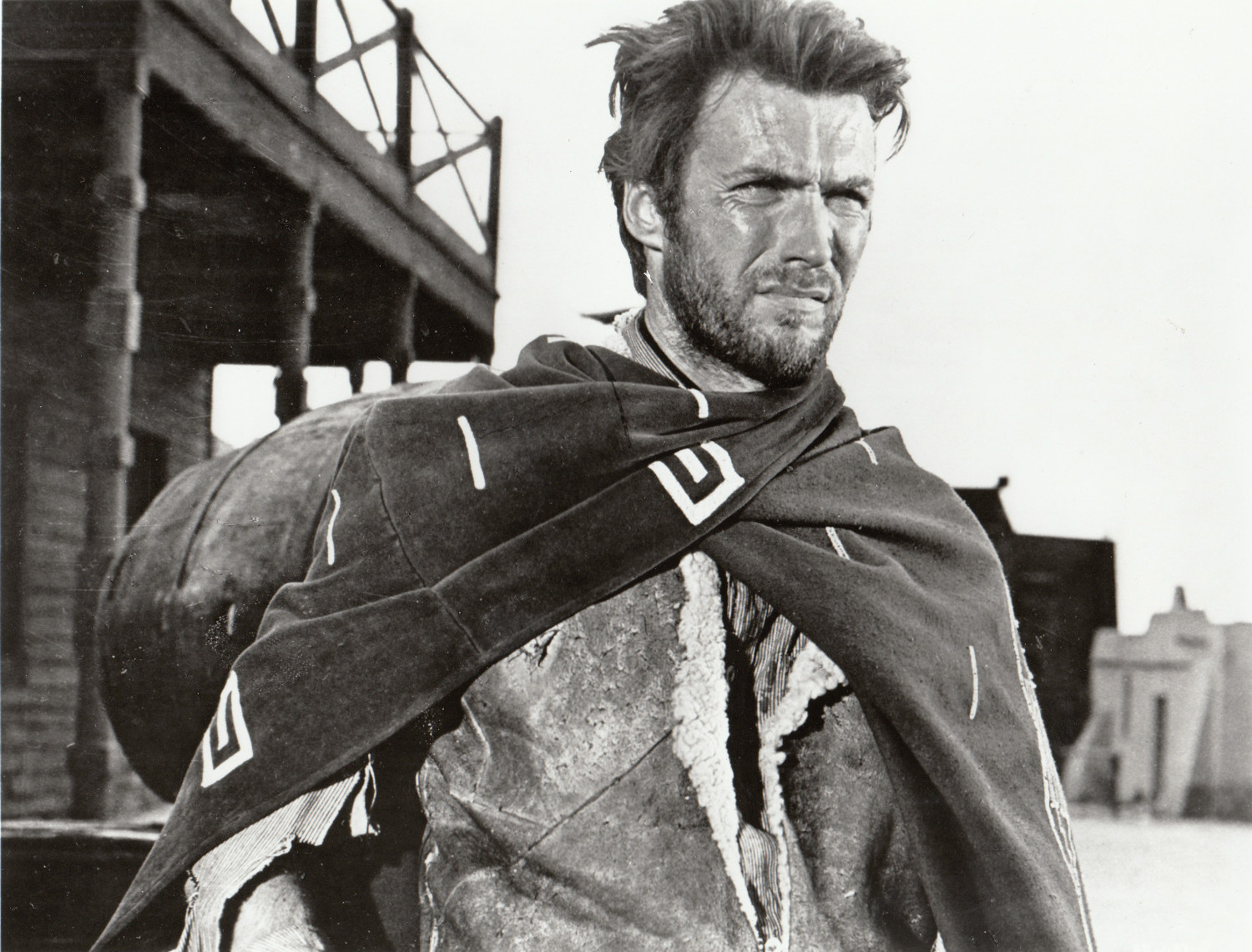
Clint Eastwood as the Man with No Name in A Fistful of Dollars

=== Novel series ===
The Dollars Trilogy spawned a series of spin-off books focused on the Man with No Name, dubbed the Dollars series due to the common theme in their titles:

- A Fistful of Dollars (1972), film novelization by Frank Chandler
- For a Few Dollars More (1965), film novelization by Joe Millard
- The Good, the Bad and the Ugly (1967), film novelization by Joe Millard
- A Dollar to Die For (1967) by Brian Fox
- A Coffin Full of Dollars (1971) by Joe Millard
- The Devil's Dollar Sign (1972) by Joe Millard
- Blood For a Dirty Dollar (1973) by Joe Millard
- The Million-Dollar Bloodhunt (1973) by Joe Millard

=== Comic series ===
In July 2007, American comic book company Dynamite Entertainment announced that they were going to begin publishing a comic book featuring the Man with No Name, titled The Man With No Name. Set after the events of The Good, the Bad and the Ugly, the comic is written by Christos Gage. Dynamite refers to him as "Blondie", the nickname Tuco uses for him in The Good, the Bad and the Ugly. The first issue was released in March 2008, entitled, The Man with No Name: The Good, The Bad, and The Uglier. Luke Lieberman and Matt Wolpert took over the writing for issues #7–11. Initially, Chuck Dixon was scheduled to take over the writing chores with issue #12, but Dynamite ended the series and opted to use Dixon's storyline for a new series titled The Good, The Bad and The Ugly. Despite its title, the new series was not an adaptation of the film. After releasing eight issues, Dynamite abandoned the series.

== Home media ==
The films had various VHS releases in Italy and in other countries, including some editions boxed together with Leone's other spaghetti western films (Once Upon a Time in the West and Duck, You Sucker!).

The 1999 DVD, plus the 2010 and 2014 Blu-ray box set releases by MGM (distributed by 20th Century Fox Home Entertainment), make specific reference to the set of films as "The Man with No Name Trilogy".

== Notes ==
=== Bibliography ===
- Eliot, Marc (2009). American Rebel: The Life of Clint Eastwood. Harmony Books. ISBN 978-0-307-33688-0.
