= Sacco and Vanzetti (disambiguation) =

Sacco and Vanzetti were two Italian anarchists who were executed for murder in the United States in 1927.

Sacco and Vanzetti may also refer to:

- Sacco & Vanzetti (1971 film), an Italian film
- The Diary of Sacco and Vanzetti, a 2004 docu-drama
- Sacco and Vanzetti (2006 film), a documentary film
- Sacco and Vanzetti (Blitzstein opera), 2001 opera
- Sacco and Vanzetti (Coppola opera), 2001 opera
- Sacco and Vanzetti (play), 1960 Italian play

== Places ==
- Sakko i Vantsetti, village in eastern Ukraine
- The former name of Yehorove, Crimea until 1948

== See also ==
- Vanzetti
