= The Good, the Bad and the Ugly (theme) =

Theme from the film The Good, the Bad and the Ugly

"The Good, the Bad and the Ugly" is a theme composed by Ennio Morricone. It first appeared in the 1966 film of the same name, and was included on the film soundtrack as "The Good, the Bad and the Ugly (main title)", with Bruno Nicolai conducting the orchestra. A cover version by Hugo Montenegro in 1967 was a pop hit in both the US and the UK. It has since become one of the most iconic scores in film history.

== Ennio Morricone version ==
"The Good, the Bad and the Ugly"

Song by Ennio Morricone

from the album The Good, The Bad and The Ugly: Original Motion Picture Soundtrack
- Released: December 29, 1966
- Genre: Instrumental
- Length: 2:38
- Label: EMI America
- Songwriter: Ennio Morricone
- Producer: Ennio Morricone

Ennio Morricone was an Italian composer who created music for hundreds of films. In the 1960s, director Sergio Leone was impressed by a musical arrangement of Morricone's and asked his former schoolmate to compose music for one of his films, A Fistful of Dollars. This led to a collaboration between the two on future Leone films, many of which came to be referred to as "Spaghetti Westerns".

After a steady percussion beat, the theme to The Good, the Bad and the Ugly begins with a two-note melody sounding like the howl of a coyote. Additional sounds follow, some of which symbolize characters and themes from the film. This instrumental composition plays at the beginning of the film. Morricone commented that his frequent collaborator guitarist Bruno Battisti D'Amario was "able to conjure up extraordinary sounds with his guitar" recording the composition. The music is complex and features soprano recorder, drums, bass ocarina, chimes, electric guitar, trumpets, whistling, and a choir.

Largely due to the memorable quality of the main theme, the film's soundtrack peaked at #4 on the Billboard 200 album chart, and it stayed on this chart for over a year.

== Hugo Montenegro version ==
"The Good, the Bad and the Ugly"

Single by Hugo Montenegro and his Orchestra and Chorus

from the album Music from The Good, the Bad and the Ugly, A Fistful of Dollars and For a Few Dollars More
- B-side: "March with Hope" (US); "There's Got to Be a Better Way" (UK)
- Released: January 1968
- Recorded: November 1967
- Genre: Instrumental, rock, pop
- Length: 2:45
- Label: RCA Victor – 47-9423
- Songwriter: Ennio Morricone
- Producer: Hugo Montenegro

Hugo Montenegro and his Orchestra and Chorus singles chronology
"The Good, the Bad and the Ugly" (1968)	"Hang 'Em High" (1968)

Hugo Montenegro was an American composer and orchestra leader who began scoring films in the 1960s. After hearing the music from The Good, the Bad and the Ugly, he decided to create a cover version of the theme. Musician Tommy Morgan is quoted in Wesley Hyatt's The Billboard Book of #1 Adult Contemporary Hits as saying that Montenegro's version "...was done in one day. I think it was all day one Saturday at RCA." Similar to Morricone's original composition, Montenegro and a few session musicians sought to recreate this record using their own instrumentation. The opening two note segment was played on an ocarina by Art Smith; Morgan provided the sounds that followed on a harmonica. He was quoted as saying: "I knew it was live, so I had to do this hand thing, the 'wah-wah-wah' sound." Hyatt's book states that Montenegro himself "grunted something which came out like 'rep, rup, rep, rup, rep'" between the chorus segments. Other musicians heard on the record include Elliot Fisher (electric violin), Mannie Klein (piccolo trumpet) and Muzzy Marcellino, whose whistling is heard during the recording.

Much to the surprise of Montenegro and the musicians who worked with him, this cover of the film theme became a hit single during 1968. It peaked at #2 on the Hot 100 chart on 1 June 1968, held off the top spot by another film song, Simon & Garfunkel's "Mrs. Robinson" (from The Graduate (1967)), and was on the Hot 100 for the most consecutive weeks for any entry entirely within 1968, a total of 22 weeks. It spent three weeks atop the Billboard Easy Listening chart during the same time frame. In September 1968, Montenegro's version reached the UK singles chart and began a steady climb, eventually reaching the top of the chart on 16 November and remaining there for four weeks.

== Other uses ==
Detailing this piece in a description of the film soundtrack, the website CD Universe states that it is "so familiar as to be a cultural touchstone. Even an abbreviated soundbite of the theme is enough to conjure images of desolate desert plains, rolling tumbleweeds, and a cowboy-booted figure standing ominously in the distance." It has been used frequently to convey these sorts of images on radio, film and television in the years since the film's release. The Simpsons has used the opening notes of this theme in multiple episodes over the years.

Wall of Voodoo recorded a live rendition of the song as part of a medley with "Hang 'Em High". The recording appeared as a non-album B-side to their single "Ring of Fire".

Numerous musicians have, in full or in part, borrowed from this piece. Bill Berry, former drummer of the band R.E.M., played what was dubbed an "Ennio whistle" on the track "How the West Was Won and Where It Got Us", from their 1996 album New Adventures in Hi-Fi. The American punk rock group Ramones were known to play a recording of this piece at the beginning of their concerts, while at the end of their shows, a snippet of "The Ecstasy of Gold" was played. Punk band The Vandals sampled the beginning of this piece at the beginning of their song "Urban Struggle" on their EP Peace thru Vandalism. British singer Jessie Ware interpolated the song in her 2026 single "Ride" from the album Superbloom.

The song was used in Argentinian and Portuguese TV commercials for cigarettes in 1981. The theme was used in 2014 for commercials for the Nissan Altima and also was used in 2015 for a Nestlé Dancow 1+ milk commercial in Indonesia.

Comedian Eddie Murphy whistled the opening notes during the "Shoe-Throwing Mother" monologue of his 1983 Delirious television special.

== Certifications ==
Region	Certification	Certified units/sales
United States (RIAA) Mastertone	Gold	500,000^{*}
^{*} Sales figures based on certification alone.
