= Sacco & Vanzetti (1971 film) =

1971 film by Giorgio Montaldo

- Italian film poster
- Directed by: Giuliano Montaldo
- Screenplay by: Fabrizio Onofri; Giuliano Montaldo
- Story by: Giuliano Montaldo; Fabrizio Onofri; Mino Roli
- Based on: Sacco and Vanzetti by Mino Roli; Luciano Vincenzoni
- Produced by: Arrigo Colombo; Giorgio Papi
- Starring: Gian Maria Volonté; Riccardo Cucciolla; Cyril Cusack; Rosanna Fratello; Geoffrey Keen; Milo O'Shea; William Prince; Claude Mann
- Cinematography: Silvano Ippoliti
- Edited by: Nino Baragli
- Music by: Ennio Morricone (score); Joan Baez (lyrics)
- Production companies: Jolly Film; Unidis; Theatre Le Rex S.A.
- Distributed by: Ital-Noleggio Cinematografico (Italy); Compagnie Française de Distribution Cinématographique (France)
- Release date: 16 March 1971
- Running time: 121 minutes
- Country: Italy; France

Sacco & Vanzetti (Italian: Sacco e Vanzetti) is a 1971 historical legal drama film, based on the trial of Italian-American anarchists Nicola Sacco and Bartolomeo Vanzetti, whose guilty verdict and execution was considered a politically-motivated miscarriage of justice. The film is directed and co-written by Giuliano Montaldo, and stars Gian Maria Volonté and Riccardo Cucciolla in the title roles. The cast also features Cyril Cusack, Milo O'Shea, Geoffrey Keen and Rosanna Fratello.

An Italian and French co-production, the film is mainly shot in color although it both starts and finishes in black and white, and also includes period black and white newsreels. The musical score was composed and conducted by Ennio Morricone with the three-part ballad sung by Joan Baez.

The film was released to Italian theatres on 16 March 1971. At the 1971 Cannes Film Festival, Montaldo was nominated for the Palme d'Or and Riccardo Cucciolla won the Best Actor Award. It also won Nastro d'Argento Awards for Best Actor (Cucciolla), Best Score (Morricone), and Best New Actress (Fratello).

== Plot ==
In April 1920, Italian immigrants Nicola Sacco and Bartolomeo Vanzetti are charged in connection with the murder of a guard and a paymaster during the 15 April 1920, armed robbery of the Slater and Morrill Shoe Company in Braintree, Massachusetts. Their anarchist political beliefs are used as evidence against them, but defense attorney Fred Moore is convinced of their innocence. As anti-immigrant and anti-leftist sentiments run high, the two are repeatedly railroaded by the political and judicial establishment, who intend to make an example of the two.

The two are found guilty and sentenced to death. Vanzetti attempts to get clemency by pleading guilty, but later retracts, praising the courage of Sacco, who, by not bending to the request for clemency, will have given full testimony of his own innocence. The two are executed by electric chair in 1927, maintaining their innocence to their deaths.

== Cast ==
- Gian Maria Volonté as Bartolomeo Vanzetti
- Riccardo Cucciolla as Nicola Sacco
- Cyril Cusack as Frederick G. Katzmann
- Rosanna Fratello as Rosa Sacco
- Geoffrey Keen as Judge Webster Thayer
- Milo O'Shea as Fred Moore
- William Prince as William Thompson
- Claude Mann as Eddie, journalist (based on Reuben Witt)
- Edward Jewesbury as Alvan T. Fuller
- Armenia Balducci as Virginia Vanzetti
- Valentino Orfeo as Celestino Madeiros
- John Harvey as A. Mitchell Palmer
- Lewis E. Ciannelli as Courtroom Interpreter
- Pier Giovanni Anchisi as Defense Committee Member
- Desmond Perry as Lieutenant
- Marisa Fabbri as Mary Splaine
- Sergio Fantoni as Giuseppe Andrower
- Maria Grazia Marescalchi as Brini
- Claudio Sora as Joe Morelli
- Giacomo Piperno as Pelser
- Carlo Sabatini as McCallum

== Production ==
=== Development ===
The film is based on a stage play of the same name, written by Mino Roli and Luciano Vincenzoni, which was first performed in Rome in 1960, and was a moderate critical and commercial success. Gian Maria Volonté and Riccardo Cucciolla had both starred in the original play, albeit in different roles (the former as Sacco and the latter as Celestino Madeiros).

After obtaining the rights, Arrigo Colombo and Giorgio Papi wanted Yves Montand and Lino Ventura to play the lead roles.

=== Filming ===
Though Giuliano Montaldo wanted to shoot the film on-location in Boston, after scouting the area he realized it had changed too much since the events when the film took place. The only scenes shot in Boston was the Slater-Morrill Shoe Company factory, whose building was still relatively unchanged since 1920.

The majority of the film was shot in Dublin, Ireland, while the prison scenes were shot in Yugoslavia. The remaining interiors were shot in Rome.

== Music ==
The film's soundtrack was composed and conducted by Ennio Morricone, with song lyrics by the American folk singer Joan Baez. For the lyrics of "The Ballad of Sacco and Vanzetti Part 1," Baez made use of Emma Lazarus' 1883 sonnet The New Colossus, the lines of which appear inscribed on a bronze plaque in the pedestal of the Statue of Liberty.

The song "Here's to You" is sung at the end of the film. For the lyrics of "Here's to You" Baez made use of a statement attributed to Vanzetti by Philip D. Strong, a reporter for the North American Newspaper Alliance who visited Vanzetti in prison in May 1927, three months before his execution:

If it had not been for these things, I might have lived out my life talking at street corners to scorning men. I might have died, unmarked, unknown, a failure. Now we are not a failure. This is our career and our triumph. Never in our full life could we hope to do such work for tolerance, for justice, for man's understanding of man as we now do by accident. Our words—our lives—our pains—nothing! The taking of our lives—lives of a good shoemaker and a poor fish peddler—all! That last moment belongs to us—that agony is our triumph.

"Here's to You" plays in the 1978 film Germany in Autumn, accompanying footage of the funeral for Red Army Faction members Andreas Baader, Gudrun Ensslin, and Jan-Carl Raspe, who had committed suicide.

The song became known to a younger, video game-playing generation, due to its appearances in the Metal Gear Solid series (both in Metal Gear Solid 4: Guns of the Patriots and Metal Gear Solid V: Ground Zeroes, where it is featured within the latter game's story).

The film soundtrack was released in a downloadable format in 2005 featuring fourteen tracks:

1. "Speranze di libertà"
2. "La ballata di Sacco e Vanzetti, Pt. 1"
3. "Nel carcere"
4. "La ballata di Sacco e Vanzetti, Pt. 2"
5. "Sacco e il figlio"
6. "Speranze di libertà" (#2)
7. "Nel carcere" (#2)
8. "La ballata di Sacco e Vanzetti, Pt. 3"
9. "Libertà nella speranza"
10. "E dover morire"
11. "Sacco e il figlio" (#2)
12. "La sedia elettrica"
13. "Libertà nella speranza" (#2)
14. "Here's to You"

== Reception ==
=== Critical response ===
Roger Ebert described the film as "one of the best" of the year. Ebert drew particular attention to the way that Montaldo handled his courtroom scenes: "A tricky area for any director, but one which the director handles in an interesting and maybe even brand-new way." Ebert wrote,

[Montaldo] has already made us aware of the crowds surging outside the courthouse, and in the [contemporary newsreel sequences on the] streets of world capitals. Then, inside the courtroom, he stays away from the conventional straight-on shots of the observers. Instead, the people on the other side of the railing are seen in angular long-shots, so that when outbursts and commotions take place, the courtroom railing itself acts like a police line and the crowd seems to yearn against it. Without ever making too much of a point of it, Montaldo visually equates the inside and the outside action, and it works.

With regard to the historical accuracy of the film, Ebert considered the film to be

...sometimes accurate, sometimes biased and sometimes even fictional in its telling of the story, but no matter. The versions of the 'truth' in the Sacco-Vanzetti case are so various, anyway, that a factual retelling would probably be beyond the capabilities of a feature film. Sacco and Vanzetti are beyond being helped by any film, for that matter, and the purpose of this film . . . is more to alert us to how law can be used as a blunt instrument of politics [than other contemporary films of the day].

Despite his friends' criticism that the film was "just another left-wing, European blast at the United States," Vincent Canby, in a review for The New York Times, praised the film, if for nothing more than calling "to our attention a terrible chapter in American history." Canby, however, dismissed the film as a simplification that

...takes the form of not particularly stylish political cartooning. This is especially true of the supporting performances he has gotten from Cyril Cusack as Katzman, the prosecuting attorney, and Geoffrey Keen, as Judge Thayer, the judge who presided at the trial and, under Massachusetts law, had the unfortunate right to rule on a second trial when new evidence was presented to him. They are blandly evil, cutout figures, as are all of the intimidated witnesses, bigoted observers and political opportunists who swarm across the film.

Canby also decried the film's soundtrack, which he described as "absolutely dreadful," with Baez's voice "used to certify the movie's noble intentions, but through the cheapest of means."

Regarding Gian Maria Volonté performance, Pauline Kael for The New Yorker said that Volonté was a "great actor" and that when he "marched to his death, you felt it would take a lot of juice to kill him." She goes onto to mention that "he isn't smoothly handsome [but that] he's so full of life he's beautiful."

=== Political response ===
The film, according to the testimony of its director, significantly contributed to the historical and moral rehabilitation of the two in the United States of America: when in a public ceremony held on 23 August 1977, the 50th anniversary of their execution, the governor of Massachusetts Michael Dukakis officially recognized the judicial error and the malice of the magistrates, the director Giuliano Montaldo was "invited to rehabilitation for having contributed to it."

=== Awards and nominations ===
In May 1971, Sacco & Vanzetti was a competition entry at the 24th International Film Festival of Cannes where, for his portrayal of Nicola Sacco, Riccardo Cucciolla won the award for Best Actor. Also that year, Rosanna Fratello was awarded Best Young Actress by the Association of Italian Film Journalists for her portrayal of Rosa Sacco (the wife of Nicola Sacco). Morricone's soundtrack won the Nastro d'Argento (Silver Band) prize in its category.

== Restoration ==
The film was restored by the Cineteca di Bologna, the Istituto Luce and Rai Cinema in 2017.

== See also ==
- Sacco and Vanzetti (2006 film)
- The Diary of Sacco and Vanzetti
