= Carotenuto =

Carotenuto is an Italian surname. Notable people with the surname include:

- Bruno Carotenuto (born 1941), Italian actor
- Mario Carotenuto (1915–1995), Italian actor
- Memmo Carotenuto (1908–1980), Italian actor, father of Bruno and brother of Mario
- Linda Tripp, née Carotenuto
