= Alberto Ísola =

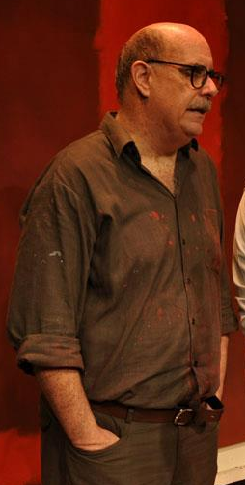
- Born: Alberto Juan Bautista Ísola de Lavalle; 12 February 1953 (age 73); Lima, Peru
- Education: Pontifical Catholic University of Peru (BA)
- Occupations: Actor, director, theatre professor

Alberto Juan Bautista Ísola de Lavalle (born 12 February 1953) is a Peruvian actor, director, and theatre teacher. Ísola has dedicated himself to theater since he was 18 years old, starring in and directing classic and contemporary works. He is considered a major name in Peruvian theatre.

== Biography ==
Ísola was born on 12 February 1953 in Lima to Sergio Ísola Tealdo and María del Rosario de Lavalle Garragori. Rosario was the daughter of José Antonio de Lavalle García and the granddaughter of José Antonio de Lavalle. He went to school at Inmaculado Corazón and the Santa María Marianistas in his youth. His first time in a play at a theatre was when he was 18, and worked as an assistant in a play directed by Gustavo Bueno and tapped him to replace an actor who played an old gravedigger. He studied Letters and Theatre at the Pontifical Catholic University of Peru (PUCP) and would soon travel to Europe and started a professional acting career, first at the Theatrical Animation set at the Scuola del Piccolo in Milan from 1972 to 1974 and, soon after, with Professional Direction at the Drama Centre in London from 1974 to 1977. Afterwards, he studied with Eugenio Barba and Jerzy Grotowsky at the International School of Theatre Anthropology (ISTA) in Volterra, Tuscany, Italy in 1981.

At 25, he returned to Lima and acted in the piece Los calzones by Luis Peirano. In 1985, he played the role of Mayor Garrido in the film adaptation of the Mario Vargas Llosa novel The Time of the Hero, which was directed by Francisco Lombardi. In 1999, he participated in the film Coraje and the telenovela Girasoles para Lucía. These would be followed by other television productions such as Milagros, Cazando a un millonario, Besos robados, and Eva del Edén. During this time period, he also hosted acting workshops, where one of his students was actor and future Prime Minister of Peru Salvador del Solar.

He lent his voice to the animated film Pirates in Callao, which premiered in 2005. The same year, he directed the work No te preocupes, ojos azules, and acted in renditions of The Merchant of Venice and Sacco and Vanzetti. Ísola was the director of studies at the Graduation Center of the Teatro de la Universidad Católica and as a professor with a specialty in Performing Arts at the Faculty of Science and Communication Arts at the PUCP. Years after came the founding of the Faculty of Performing Arts of PUCP, and he would take up the role of assistant teacher at the Academic Department of Performing Arts.

In 2004, he directed and acted in Laberinto, which was well received in Chile. In 2007, he acted in the series Mi problema con las mujeres as Simón. The series was later nominated for the International Emmy Awards in the category for Best Comedy. In theatre, he participated in the La fiesta del chivo and Art.

In 2009, he took part in Volpone, which was presented at the 4th International Theatre Show of Lima; he also directed the El cine Edén (about L´Eden cinéma by Marguerite Duras). The year after he directed the work Las tremendas aventuras de la capitana Gazpacho and acted in the telenovela Los exitosos Gome$. Ísola starred in the La Perricholi together withMelania Urbina in 2011, playing the role of Virrey Manuel de Amat y Juniet. That same year he directed Sangre como flores, la pasión según García Lorca and La vida en dos horas; he also starred in Una vida en el teatro, Pequeñas interrupciones y La cura de Troya.

On 10 June 2011, he received a recognition to pay tribute to the 50th Anniversary of TUC which was held at the Centro Cultural Peruano Japonés as part of its exhibit "Charlas Memorables del Teatro Peruano".

At the beginning of 2012, he interpreted the abstract expressionist artist Mark Rothko in Rojo (Red by John Logan). In July, he directed La falsa criada and would follow this up with the musical Te odio amor mío with Ebelin Ortiz. In television, he took part in the telenovela La Tayson, corazón rebelde. Ísola would later direct De repente, el verano pasado and took part in Viaje de un largo día hacia la noche in 2013.

== Filmography ==
=== Films ===
- The City and the Dogs (1985) as Mayor Garrido.
- Eruption (1997) as Coronel Álvarez.
- Coraje (1998) as Ministro.
- Lost Bullet (2001)
- Pirates in Callao (2005) as Jacques L'Hermite (voice ).
- Condominio (2007) as Javier.
- Crossing a Shadow (2007) as Don Felipe Beltrán.
- Valentino y el clan del can (2008) as El Innombrable (voz).
- Rosa mística (2019) as Padre Juan de Lorenzana
- The Inheritance of Flora (2024) as Pío Tristán.
- Petroaudios (2026) as Alberto Químper, who was one of the main figures in the Caso Petroaudios.

=== Television ===
- Todos somos estrellas (1993) as Rodolfo Cárdenas.
- La noche (1996) as Víctor.
- Torbellino (1997) as Don José.
- Girasoles para Lucía (1999) as Paolo Trevi.
- Milagros (2000–2001) as Rafael De La Torre.
- Cazando a un millonario (2001) as Francisco "Paco" Alonso.
- Besos robados (2004) as Walter Dreyer.
- Eva del Edén (2004) as Archbishop Jerónimo de Loayza.
- Mi problema con las mujeres (2007) as Simón.
- Los exitosos Gome$ (2010) as Franco Andrada Castillo.
- La Perricholi (2011) as Virrey Manuel de Amat y Juniet.
- La Tayson, corazón rebelde (2012) as Damián Sánchez-Concha.

== Theatre ==
=== Director ===
- The Good Person of Szechwan (1986)
- Las que cantan (1987)
- El matrimonio de Bette y Boo (1990)
- La conquista del polo sur (1991)
- Sofocos, belenes y trajines (1992)
- El viaje de un barquito de papel (1992)
- Dreyfuss (1994)
- El Cisne (1995)
- As You Like It by William Shakespeare (1998)
- Mujeres de primera
- Séptimo cielo
- La salsa roja
- The Seagull by Anton Chekhov
- El cartero
- Hamlet by William Shakespeare. (2001)
- Pinocho (2002)
- Mi mamá me dijo
- Laberinto
- El último barco by César de María.
- El zorrito audaz (2005) Teatro Británico.
- El zorrito audaz y el ave voraz.
- El zorrito audaz. ¡Peligro en la selva!
- No te preocupes, ojos azules (2005) Auditorio de la Municipalidad de San Isidro.
- Boston Marriage by David Mamet. (2007) CCPUCP.
- Ña Catita de Manuel Ascencio Segura. (2009)
- Brel (2009)
- El cine Edén (2009) Teatro de la Alianza Francesa.
- Waiting for the Hearse by Jacobo Langsner. (2009)
- Las tremendas aventuras de la capitana Gazpacho (2010) Centro Cultural El Olivar.
- Extras (2010) Teatro Mario Vargas Llosa.
- Mother Courage and Her Children by Bertolt Brecht. (2010) Teatro Británico.
- Sangre como flores, la pasión según García Lorca (2011), by Eduardo Adrianzén.
- La vida en dos horas, by Mateo Chiarella, Mariana de Althaus, Claudia Sacha, Gonzalo Rodríguez Risco, Patricia Romero, Jaime Nieto. (2011)
- La Fausse Suivante (2012), by Pierre de Marivaux. Teatro La Plaza.
- Te odio amor mío (2012)
- Suddenly Last Summer (2013)
- Espinas (2013), by Eduardo Adrianzén
- Le Bal (2013) FAEL, by Irene Nemirovsky, adaption by Sergi Belbel.
- Este hijo
- What the Butler Saw by Joe Orton (2014)
- Canciones para mirar" by María Elena Walsh (2014)
- Casi Transilvania by Barbara Colio (2015)
- El Continente Negro by Marco Antonio de la Parra (2015)
- The Winter's Tale by William Shakespeare (2015)
- Cielo abierto (2016)
- La piedra oscura (2018)
- La travesía (2019)
- Estrategia de luz (2019)

=== Actor ===
- Los calzones (1978)
- La Nona
- ¡Ay, Carmela!
- Waiting for Godot (1997) as Vladimir. Directed by Edgar Saba.
- King Lear (1999) as Lear. Directed by Edgar Saba.
- El cruce sobre el Niágara by Alonso Alegría. Directed by Roberto Ángeles.
- Fausto, as Dr. Fausto. Directed by Jorge Guerra.
- Othello, as Iago. Directed by Edgar Saba.
- The Threepenny Opera Directed by Jorge Guerra.
- The Merchant of Venice (2005) as Shylock. Directed by Roberto Ángeles.
- Death of a Salesman as Willy Loman. Directed by Edgar Saba.
- Henry V. Directed by Jorge Chiarella Krüger.
- Sacco and Vanzetti (2005) as Bartolomeo Vanzetti. Directed by Mateo Chiarella Viale
- Art (2007) as Marc. Directed by Roberto Ángeles.
- The Feast of the Goat (2007) Directed by Jorge Alí Triana.
- Al pie del Támesis by Mario Vargas Llosa. Directed by Luis Peirano.
- Amores de un siglo Directed by Edgar Saba.
- Volpone (2009) as Volpone. Directed by Roberto Ángeles.
- La puerta del cielo (2010) as Javier. Directed by Alfonso Santistevan.
- Una vida en el teatro (2011) as Robert. Directed by Edgar Saba.
- Pequeñas interrupciones (2011) as Dino. Directed by Mateo Chiarella Viale.
- La cura en Troya (2011) as Filoctetes. Directed by Jorge Guerra.
- Red (2012) as Mark Rothko. Directed by Juan Carlos Fisher.
- Long Day's Journey into Night (2013) as James Tyrone. Directed by Roberto Ángeles.
- Dúo (2013) Directed by Giovanni Ciccia.
- Incendios (2014) Directed by Juan Carlos Fisher
- Otras ciudades del desierto (2015) Directed by Juan Carlos Fisher.
- La terquedad by Rafael Spregelburd (2017). Directed by Sergio Llusera
- La Tempestad (2017) Directed by Roberto Ángeles.
- El caballo del libertador by Alfonso Santistevan (2018)
- Todos los sueños del mundo (2019) as Adriano Fontana

== Awards and nominations ==
Year	Award	Category	Work	Result
2008	International Emmy Awards	Best Comedy	Mi problema con las mujeres	Nominated
2010	Premios Luces de El Comercio Perú	Best TV Actor	Los exitosos Gome$	Won
2011	Recognition of his artistic career for the 50th Anniversary of TUC		Himself	Won
2012	Premios Luces de El Comercio	Best theatre actor	Rojo	Nominated
2013	Premios Luces de El Comercio	Best theatre actor	Viaje de un largo día hacia la noche	Nominated
2020	Premios Luces de El Comercio	Best theatre actor	Conferencia sobre la lluvia	Won
