= Vanzetta =

Vanzetta is a surname. Notable people with the surname include:

- Bice Vanzetta (born 1961), Italian cross-country skier
- Giorgio Vanzetta (born 1959), Italian cross-country skier

== See also ==
- Vanzetti
