= William Thompkins =

William Thompkins may refer to:

- William H. Thompkins (1872–1916), Buffalo Soldier in the United States Army
- William J. Thompkins (1884–1944), physician and health administrator in Kansas City
- William R. Thompkins (1925–1971), American actor and stuntman
