= Muzzy Marcellino =

American singer and musician (1912–97)

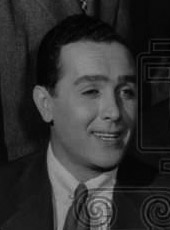
- Marcellino in 1953
- Born: November 27, 1912; San Francisco, California, U.S.
- Died: June 11, 1997 (aged 84)
- Relatives: Vince Guaraldi (nephew)

Maurice "Muzzy" Marcellino (November 27, 1912 – June 11, 1997) was an American singer and musician, known primarily for his clear, melodious style of whistling.

== Career ==
Marcellino was born in San Francisco. He began playing with the Lofner-Harris Orchestra in 1932 and then moved to the Ted Fio Rito band in 1935. He formed the Marcellino Orchestra in 1938, with Gloria DeHaven as his singer.

Marcellino's whistling was featured in many television and film soundtracks, such as The Mickey Mouse Club and Lassie. His contributions can also be heard on the soundtrack to the 1954 film The High and the Mighty and on Hugo Montenegro's 1968 hit version of the main theme to the film The Good, the Bad and the Ugly.

He was also the musical director of the CBS daytime show, Art Linkletter's House Party.

The Reader's Digest set of six records called Gaslight Music Hall (1969) featured Marcellino whistling in the tune Whistling Rufus, performed by the Gaslight Novelty Orchestra and conducted by Heinie Beau. Whistling Rufus was composed by Kerry Mills and, as stated on the record collection, the jaunty Whistling Rufus came at a transitional point in his career.

Marcellino was the maternal uncle of jazz musician Vince Guaraldi.
