= Grand Slam (1967 film) =

- US film poster
- Italian: Ad ogni costo
- Directed by: Giuliano Montaldo
- Screenplay by: Mino Roli; Augusto Caminito; Marcello Fondato; José Antonio de la Loma; Marcello Coscia
- Story by: Mino Roli; Augusto Caminito; Paolo Bianchini
- Produced by: Arrigo Colombo; Giorgio Papi
- Starring: Janet Leigh; Robert Hoffmann; Klaus Kinski; Riccardo Cucciolla; George Rigaud; Adolfo Celi; Edward G. Robinson
- Cinematography: Antonio Macasoli
- Edited by: Nino Baragli
- Music by: Ennio Morricone
- Production companies: Jolly Film; Coral Producciones Cinematográficas; Constantin Film
- Distributed by: Unidis (Italy); Filmax (Spain); Constantin Film (West Germany); Paramount Pictures (International)
- Release dates: 28 September 1967 (Italy); 6 January 1968 (West Germany); 21 April 1969 (Spain)
- Running time: 119 minutes
- Countries: Italy; Spain; West Germany
- Language: English

Grand Slam (Italian: Ad ogni costo, lit. 'At any cost') is a 1967 heist film directed by Giuliano Montaldo and starring Janet Leigh, Robert Hoffmann, Klaus Kinski, Riccardo Cucciolla, George Rigaud, Adolfo Celi and Edward G. Robinson. The musical score was composed by Ennio Morricone.

The film is an Italian, Spanish, and West German co-production. It premiered on September 28, 1967.

== Plot ==
A seemingly mild-mannered teacher, Professor James Anders, is an American working in Rio de Janeiro. Bored with years of teaching, Anders retires and sets about putting together a team to pull off a diamond heist during the Rio Carnival in Brazil.

With the help of Mark Milford, a youthhood friend and now successful criminal, Anders recruits a team of four international experts to carry out the robbery: Gregg, an English safecracking specialist; Agostino Rossi, an Italian mechanical and electronics genius; Jean-Paul Audry, a French playboy (whose job it is to seduce the only woman with a key to the building holding the diamonds, the lovely Mary Ann); and Erich, a German ex-military man.

The team develops a series of mechanical devices to defeat the layers of protection built within the building in which the diamonds are stored, mainly photocells which crisscross the entry corridor, and the new "Grand Slam 70" safe system: an alarm triggered by any sound detected near the safe room by means of a sensitive microphone that listens for sounds while the safe and its environs are secured. Although the presence of the latter system is found by the team only one day in advance and at first this seems to impose a stop to the entire action, Agostino is able to find a genial solution to overcome the problem, so that the action can start.

The team successfully enters the safe using a pneumatic trestle to bypass the photocell beams by crawling over them, accesses the safe room with Mary Ann's key stolen by Jean-Paul, moves the safe to the corridor using shaving cream to dampen their sounds, and finally opens the safe with specific nitroglycerin charges. They successfully escape, but the following day the police are alerted by Mary Ann, who has found that the safe key had been temporarily taken. While the team passes through a road block, Jean-Paul is identified and Gregg is killed during the ensuing chase. After evading the police, Erich turns on his comrades and murders Jean-Paul; Agostino escapes back to Rio to join Stetuaka, a woman he has fallen in love with, only to be shot by the police.

Erich delivers the diamond case to the meeting point, but is intercepted and murdered by Milford, who discovers the case to be empty. Anders meets with Mary Ann, his secret partner in crime who swapped the diamonds for the empty case, in a cafe in Rome, but they promptly lose the gems to two thieves on a motorcycle.

== Cast ==
- Janet Leigh as Mary Ann
- Edward G. Robinson as Professor James Anders
- Robert Hoffmann as Jean-Paul Audry
- Klaus Kinski as Erich Weiss
- Riccardo Cucciolla as Agostino Rossi
- George Rigaud as Gregg Hutchinson
- Adolfo Celi as Mark Milford
- Jussara as Stetuaka
- Miguel Del Castillo as Bank Manager

== See also ==
- Heist film
