= Gruppo di Improvvisazione Nuova Consonanza =

Italian musical group

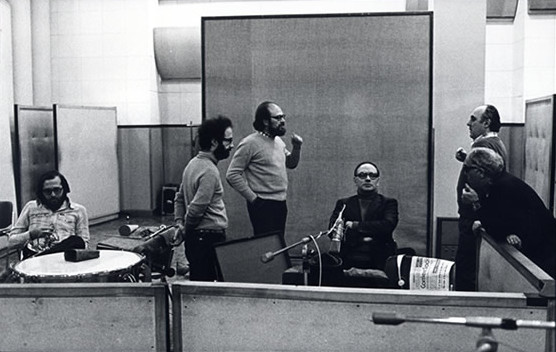
- Il Gruppo in 1978

Background information
- Origin: Rome, Italy
- Genres: Noise; avant garde; experimental; free improvisation
- Years active: 1964–1980
- Labels: Deutsche Grammophon, RCA, Cramps, General Music
- Past members: Ennio Morricone, Egisto Macchi, Franco Evangelisti, Frederic Rzewski, John Heineman, Mario Bertoncini, Walter Branchi, Roland Kayn
- Website: http://www.nuovaconsonanza.it

Gruppo di Improvvisazione Nuova Consonanza (lit. 'New Consonance Improvisation Group'), also known as The Group or Il Gruppo, was an avant-garde free improvisation group considered the first experimental composers collective.

== History ==
The collective was formed by Italian composer Franco Evangelisti in Rome in 1964. Drawing on jazz, serialism, musique concrete, and other avant-garde techniques developed by contemporary classical music composers such as Luigi Nono and Giacinto Scelsi, the group was dedicated to the development of new music techniques by improvisation, noise-techniques, and anti-musical systems. The group members and frequent guests made use of extended techniques on traditional classical instruments, as well as prepared piano, tape music and electronic music. During the 1970s the music continued to evolve to embrace techniques and genres such as guitar feedback and funk. In addition to concerts, the group issued a series of albums and contributed to many scores by group member Ennio Morricone, including A Quiet Place in the Country (1968) and Cold Eyes of Fear (1971). The group slowly disbanded after Evangelisti's death in 1980.

== Main Members ==
- Franco Evangelisti (piano, percussion)
- Ennio Morricone (trumpet, flute)
- Egisto Macchi (perc, celesta, strings)

== Other Members at times ==
- Mario Bertoncini (perc, piano)
- Walter Branchi (double-bass)
- Richard Aaker Trythall (piano)
- John Heineman (trombone, cello)
- Roland Kayn (Hammond organ, vibraphone, marimba)
- Frederic Rzewski (piano)
- Giancarlo Schiaffini (trombone, assorted wind instruments)
- Giovanni Piazza (horn, flute, violin)
- Antonello Neri (piano, et al)
- Jesus Villa Rojo (clarinet, et al)
- Bruno Battisti D'Amario (allsorts)

== Discography ==
- 1966 "Nuova Consonanza", LP RCA
- 1967 "The Private Sea of Dreams" (as Il Gruppo), LP RCA Victor
- 1968 "Improvisationen" LP Deutsche Grammophon
- 1970 "The Feed-back" (as The Group), LP RCA
- 1973 "Improvvisazioni a Formazioni Variate" (also known as "Gruppo d'Improvvisazione Nuova Consonanza"), LP General Music
- 1975 "Nuova Consonanza", LP Cinevox Records. Reissue 2007 CD Bella Casa
- 1976 "Musica su Schemi", LP Cramps Records. Reissue 2002: LP Get Back, CD Ampersand
- 1992 "1967-1975", CD Edition RZ
- 2006 "Azioni", CD Die Schachtel
- 2010 "Niente", CD Cometa Edizioni Musicali. Reissue
- 2012 LP The Omni Recording Corporation/The Roundtable
- 2011 "Eroina", CD Cometa Edizioni Musicali
