= A Fistful of Dollars =

1964 film directed by Sergio Leone

- Italian theatrical release poster
- Italian: Per un pugno di dollari
- Directed by: Sergio Leone
- Based on: Yojimbo; 1961 Japanese film by Akira Kurosawa; Ryūzō Kikushima
- Produced by: Arrigo Colombo; Giorgio Papi
- Starring: Clint Eastwood; Marianne Koch; Joseph Egger; Wolfgang Lukschy; Gian Maria Volonté; Daniel Martín; Bruno Carotenuto; Benito Stefanelli
- Cinematography: Massimo Dallamano
- Edited by: Roberto Cinquini
- Music by: Ennio Morricone
- Production companies: Jolly Film; Constantin Film; Ocean Films
- Distributed by: Unidis (Italy); Constantin Film (West Germany); Izaro Films (Spain)
- Release dates: 12 September 1964 (Italy); 5 March 1965 (West Germany); 27 September 1965 (Spain)
- Running time: 99 minutes
- Countries: Italy; Spain; West Germany
- Language: English
- Budget: $200,000–225,000
- Box office: $19.9 million

A Fistful of Dollars (Italian: Per un pugno di dollari, "For a Fistful of Dollars") is a 1964 spaghetti Western film directed by Sergio Leone and starring Clint Eastwood in his first leading role, alongside Gian Maria Volonté, Marianne Koch, Wolfgang Lukschy, Sieghardt Rupp, José Calvo, Antonio Prieto and Joseph Egger. The film, an international co-production between Italy, West Germany and Spain, was filmed on a low budget (reported to be US$200,000), and Eastwood was paid $15,000 for his role.

Released in Italy in 1964 and in the United States in 1967, the film initiated the popularity of the spaghetti Western genre. It is considered a landmark in cinema and one of the greatest and most influential films of all time. It was followed by For a Few Dollars More and The Good, the Bad and the Ugly, both also starring Eastwood. Collectively, these three films became known as the Dollars Trilogy, or the Man with No Name Trilogy, after the United Artists publicity campaign referred to Eastwood's characters in all three films as the "Man with No Name". All three films were released in sequence in the United States in 1967, making Eastwood a national celebrity.

The film has been identified as an unofficial remake of the Akira Kurosawa film Yojimbo (1961), which resulted in a successful lawsuit by Toho, Yojimbo's production company. Kurosawa wrote to Leone directly, saying, "Signor Leone, I have just had the chance to see your film. It is a very fine film, but it is my film. Since Japan is a signatory of the Berne Convention on the international copyright, you must pay me." He and Toho received 15 percent of the film's revenue. Kurosawa earned more money from this settlement than from Yojimbo.

Few spaghetti Westerns had been released in the United States at the time, so many of the European cast and crew adopted American-sounding stage names. These included Leone ("Bob Robertson"), Gian Maria Volonté ("Johnny Wels") and the composer, Ennio Morricone ("Dan Savio"). A Fistful of Dollars was shot in Spain, mostly near Hoyo de Manzanares close to Madrid, but also (like its two sequels) in the Tabernas Desert and in the Cabo de Gata-Níjar Natural Park, both in the Province of Almería.

== Plot ==
An unnamed stranger (Note: The character, notably publicized as "the Man with No Name", is listed in the credits as "Joe" and is so called, in multiple instances, by the character Piripero; nevertheless, that may not be his real name.) arrives at the little frontier town of San Miguel. Silvanito, the town's innkeeper, tells the Stranger about a feud between two smuggler families vying to gain control of the town: the Rojo brothers — Don Miguel, Esteban and Ramón — and the family of the town sheriff, John Baxter; his matriarchal wife, Consuelo; and their son, Antonio. To make money, the Stranger decides to play these families against each other. He demonstrates his deadliness to both sides by shooting to death with ease the four men who insulted him as he entered town.

The Stranger witnesses the Rojos massacre a detachment of Mexican soldiers escorting a chest of gold (to exchange for rifles) and comes up with a plan. He takes two of the dead bodies to a nearby cemetery and props them up to make them appear alive. He sells information to both factions, claiming two Mexican soldiers survived the attack. Each faction races to the cemetery, the Baxters to get the supposed survivors to testify against the Rojos, and the Rojos to silence them. They engage in a gunfight, with Ramón "killing" the supposed survivors and Esteban capturing Antonio Baxter.

While the Rojos and the Baxters are fighting, the Stranger searches the Rojo hacienda for the gold, and accidentally knocks out a woman, Marisol, whom Ramón is in love with and is holding captive. He takes her to the Baxters, who arrange to return her to the Rojos in exchange for Antonio. During the hostage exchange, Marisol's son, Jesus, and husband, Julio, approach her. Ramón orders one of his men, Rubio, to kill Julio, but he is deterred by Silvanito and the Stranger. The Stranger orders Marisol to go back to Ramón, and Julio to take their son home. He learns from Silvanito that Ramón accused Julio of cheating during a card game and took Marisol as collateral.

That night, while the Rojos are celebrating, the Stranger kills the guards, frees Marisol, and wrecks the house where she was held to create the appearance of an attack by the Baxters. He gives money to Marisol and urges her family to leave town.

The Rojos eventually discover that it was the Stranger who freed Marisol. They capture and torture him, but he escapes. Believing that he is protected by the Baxters, the Rojos set fire to the Baxter home, massacring everyone, including Baxter's wife, as they flee the burning building. With help from the local coffinmaker named Piripero, the Stranger escapes town by hiding in a coffin, and recuperates in an abandoned mine.

When Piripero tells him that Silvanito has been captured and tortured by the Rojos for the Stranger's whereabouts, he returns to town to confront them. With a steel chest plate hidden beneath his poncho, he taunts Ramón to "aim for the heart" as Ramón's shots deflect until Ramón exhausts his Winchester rifle's ammunition. The Stranger shoots the weapon from Ramón's hand and kills Don Miguel, Rubio and the other Rojo men standing nearby. He uses the last shot to free Silvanito, who is hanging from a rope by his hands.

After challenging Ramón to reload his rifle faster than he can reload his revolver, the Stranger shoots and kills him. Esteban aims for the Stranger's back from a nearby building, but is shot dead by Silvanito. The Stranger bids Silvanito and Piripero farewell, and rides away from town.

== Cast ==
- Clint Eastwood as "Joe"
- Marianne Koch as Marisol
- Gian Maria Volonté as Ramón Rojo
- Wolfgang Lukschy as Sheriff John Baxter
- Sieghardt Rupp as Esteban Rojo
- Joseph Egger as Piripero
- Antonio Prieto as Don Benito Rojo ('Don Miguel Rojo' in the English version)
- Pepe Calvo as Silvanito
- Margherita Lozano as Consuelo Baxter
- Daniel Martín as Julio
- Benny Reeves as Rubio
- Mario Brega as Chico
- Nino del Arco as Jesus
- Bruno Carotenuto as Antonio Baxter
- Aldo Sambrell as Manolo

Additional cast members include Antonio Moreno as Juan De Dios, Enrique Santiago as Fausto, Umberto Spadaro as Miguel, Fernando Sánchez Polack as Vicente, and José Riesgo as the Mexican cavalry captain. Members of the Baxter gang include Luis Barboo, Frank Braña, Antonio Molino Rojo, Lorenzo Robledo and William R. Thompkins. Members of the Rojo gang include José Canalejas, Álvaro de Luna, Nazzareno Natale and Antonio Pica.

== Development ==
A Fistful of Dollars was originally called Il Magnifico Straniero ("The Magnificent Stranger"), before the title was changed to A Fistful of Dollars. The production and development of A Fistful of Dollars, from anecdotes, was described by Italian film historian, Roberto Curti, as both contradictory and difficult to decipher. Tonino Valerii alternatively said that Barboni and Stelvio Massi met Leone outside a theater in Rome where they had seen Yojimbo, suggesting to Leone that it would make a good Western. The actor Mimmo Palmara, a friend of Leone, told a similar story to Valerii, saying that Barboni had told him about Yojimbo, and he would see it the next day with Leone and his wife, Carla.

Adriano Bolzoni stated in 1978 that he had the idea of making Yojimbo into a Western, and brought the idea to Franco Palaggi, who sent Bolzoni with Duccio Tessari to watch the film and take notes on it. Bolzoni said that both he and Tessari wrote a first draft, which moved on to Leone, noting that Tessari wrote the majority of the script.

Fernando Di Leo also claimed authorship of the script, saying that both A Fistful of Dollars and For a Few Dollars More were written by him and Tessari, and not Luciano Vincenzoni. Di Leo claimed that after Leone had the idea for the film, Tessari wrote the script and he gave him a hand. Di Leo would repeat this story in an interview, saying that he was at the first meetings of Tessari and Leone discussing what kind of film to make from Yojimbo. Di Leo noted that Leone did not like the first draft of the script, which led to him to drastically rewrite it with Tessari. Production papers for the film credit Spanish and German writers, but these were added to play into coproduction standards during this period of filmmaking, to get more financing from the Spanish and West German companies. Leone would suggest that he wrote the entire screenplay, based on Tessari's treatment.

Originally, Sergio Leone intended Henry Fonda to play the "Man with No Name". However, the production company could not afford to employ a major Hollywood star. Next, Leone offered the part to Charles Bronson. He, too, declined, saying that the script was bad. Both Fonda and Bronson would eventually star in Leone's Once Upon a Time in the West. Other actors who turned down the role were Henry Silva, Rory Calhoun, Tony Russel, Steve Reeves, Ty Hardin and James Coburn. Leone said he wanted Coburn for the role, but he was deemed too expensive. Leone turned his attention to Richard Harrison, an expatriate American actor who had recently starred in the Italian Western, Gunfight at Red Sands. Harrison, however, had not been impressed with his experience in that film, and refused. The producers presented a list of available, lesser-known American actors and asked Harrison for advice. Harrison suggested Eastwood, who he knew could play a cowboy convincingly. Harrison would state, "Maybe my greatest contribution to cinema was not doing A Fistful of Dollars and recommending Clint for the part." Eastwood said "In Rawhide, I did get awfully tired of playing the conventional white hat ... the hero who kisses old ladies and dogs and was kind to everybody. I decided it was time to be an antihero."

Eastwood said that he had a similar idea for adapting Yojimbo into a Western a few years earlier in Los Angeles, when a friend who was a fan of samurai cinema took him to watch Yojimbo at a Western Avenue theater that ran Japanese films. Eastwood recalled that he "remembered sitting there" and saying, "Boy, this would be a great western if only someone had nerve enough to do it, but they'd never have enough nerve." A few years later, after someone handed him the script for A Fistful of Dollars, "about five or 10 pages in" he "recognized it as an obvious rip-off" of Yojimbo, which he found ironic.

A Fistful of Dollars was an Italian, German and Spanish co-production, so there was a significant language barrier on set. Leone did not speak English and Eastwood communicated with the Italian cast and crew mostly through the actor and stuntman Benito Stefanelli, who also acted as an uncredited interpreter for the production, and later appeared in Leone's other pictures. Similar to other Italian films shot at the time, all footage was filmed silent, and the dialogue and sound effects were dubbed in post-production. For the Italian version of the film, Eastwood was dubbed by the actor Enrico Maria Salerno, whose sinister rendition of the Man with No Name's voice contrasted with Eastwood's cocksure and darkly humorous interpretation.

== Visual style ==
A Fistful of Dollars became the first film to exhibit Leone's distinctive style of visual direction. This was influenced by both John Ford's cinematic landscaping and the Japanese method of direction honed by Akira Kurosawa. Leone wanted an operatic feel to his Western, so there are many examples of extreme closeups of the faces of different characters, functioning like arias in a traditional opera. The rhythm, emotion and communication within scenes can be attributed to Leone's meticulous framing of his closeups. Leone's closeups are akin to portraits, often lit with Renaissance-type lighting effects, and are considered by some as pieces of design in their own right.

Eastwood was instrumental in creating the Man with No Name's distinctive visual style. He bought black jeans from a sports shop on Hollywood Boulevard; the hat came from a Santa Monica wardrobe firm; and the trademark cigars from a Beverly Hills store. He also brought props from Rawhide, including a Cobra-handled Colt, a gunbelt and spurs. The poncho was acquired in Spain. Leone and the costume designer Carlo Simi decided on the Spanish poncho for the Man with No Name. On the DVD commentary for The Good, the Bad and the Ugly, it is said that although Eastwood is a non-smoker, he felt that the foul taste of the cigar in his mouth put him in the right frame of mind for his character. Leone reportedly took quickly to Eastwood's distinctive style, and commented, "More than an actor, I needed a mask, and Eastwood, at that time, only had two expressions: with hat and no hat."

=== Title design ===
Iginio Lardani created the film's title design.

== Soundtrack ==
The film's music was written by Ennio Morricone, initially credited as Dan Savio.

Leone requested Morricone to write a theme that would be similar to Dimitri Tiomkin's El Degüello (used in Rio Bravo). Although the two themes are similar, Morricone stated that he used a lullaby that he had composed previously, and developed the theme from that. He added that what makes the two themes similar is the execution, not the arrangement.

In 1962 the expatriate American folk singer Peter Tevis recorded a version of Woody Guthrie's "Pastures of Plenty" that was arranged by Morricone. During a conference with Morricone discussing the music in the film, a recording of Tevis's "Pastures of Plenty" was played. Leone said, "That's it", with Tevis claiming that the tune and musical arrangements were copied for the music for the opening title, "Titoli".

"Some of the music was written before the film, which is unusual," said Morricone. "Leone's films were made like that because he wanted the music to be an important part of it, and he often kept the scenes longer simply because he didn't want the music to end. That's why the films are so slow — because of the music."

Although not used in the completed film, Peter Tevis recorded lyrics to Morricone's main theme for the film. As a movie tie-in to the American release, United Artists Records released a different set of lyrics to Morricone's theme, called "Restless One", and recorded by Little Anthony and the Imperials.

Tracks (2006 GDM version)

No.	Title	Length
1.	"Titoli"	2:58
2.	"Quasi morto"	1:40
3.	"Musica sospesa"	1:02
4.	"Square dance"	1:36
5.	"Ramon"	1:05
6.	"Consuelo Baxter"	1:18
7.	"Doppi giochi"	1:41
8.	"Per un pugno di dollari (1)"	1:26
9.	"Scambio di prigionieri"	0:55
10.	"Cavalcata"	3:29
11.	"L'inseguimento"	2:25
12.	"Tortura"	9:31
13.	"Alla ricerca dell'evaso"	1:22
14.	"Senza pietà"	2:08
15.	"La reazione"	2:36
16.	"Per un pugno di dollari (2)"	1:49
17.	"Per un pugno di dollari (finale)"	1:09
Total length:		38:10

=== Certifications and sales ===
Region	Certification	Certified units/sales
France (SNEP)	Gold	100,000^{*}
Summaries
Worldwide	—	3,000,000
^{*} Sales figures based on certification alone.

== Release and reception ==
=== Box office ===
Promoting A Fistful of Dollars was difficult, because no major distributor wanted to take a chance on a faux-Western and an unknown director. The film ended up being released in Italy 12 September 1964, which was typically the worst month for sales.

Despite the initial negative reviews from Italian critics, the film's popularity spread at a grassroots level, and, over the film's theatrical release, it grossed 2.7 billion lire ($4,375,000) in Italy, more than any other Italian film to that point. It sold admissions of 14,797,275 ticket sales in Italy. The film also sold 4,383,331 tickets in France and 3,281,990 tickets in Spain, earning a total of more than US$1 million grossed in international territories outside Italy and North America, and 22,462,596 tickets sold in Europe.

The release of the film was delayed in the United States, because distributors feared being sued by Kurosawa. As a result, it was not shown in American cinemas until 18 January 1967. The film grossed $4.5 million for the year. In 1969, it was rereleased, earning $1.2 million in theatrical rentals. It eventually grossed $14.5 million in the United States and Canada, totaling more than $19.9 million grossed worldwide.

=== Critical response ===
The film was initially shunned by Italian critics, who gave it extremely negative reviews. Some American critics felt differently from their Italian counterparts, with Variety praising it as having "a James Bondian vigor and tongue-in-cheek approach that was sure to capture both sophisticates and average cinema patrons".

On the film's American release in 1967, both Philip French and Bosley Crowther were unimpressed with the film itself. The critic Philip French of The Observer stated:

The calculated sadism of the film would be offensive were it not for the neutralizing laughter aroused by the ludicrousness of the whole exercise. If one didn't know the actual provenance of the film, one would guess that it was a private movie made by a group of rich European Western fans at a dude ranch ... A Fistful of Dollars looks awful, has a flat dead soundtrack, and is totally devoid of human feeling.

Bosley Crowther of The New York Times treated the film not as pastiche, but as camp-parody, stating that nearly every Western cliché could be found in this "egregiously synthetic but engrossingly morbid, violent film". He went on to patronize Eastwood's performance, stating: "He is simply another fabrication of a personality, half cowboy and half gangster, going through the ritualistic postures and exercises of each ... He is a morbid, amusing, campy fraud."

When the film was televised on the ABC network 23 February 1975, a four-and-a-half-minute prologue was added to the film to contextualize the character and justify the violence. Written and directed by Monte Hellman, it featured an unidentified U.S. official (Harry Dean Stanton) offering the imprisoned Man With No Name a chance at a pardon in exchange for cleaning up San Miguel. Closeups of Eastwood's face from archival footage are inserted into the scene alongside Stanton's performance. This prologue opened television presentations for a few years before disappearing; it reappeared on the Special Edition DVD and the more recent Blu-ray, along with an interview with Monte Hellman about its production.

The retrospective reception of A Fistful of Dollars has been much more positive, noting it as a hugely influential film in regard to the rejuvenation of the Western genre. Film historian Howard Hughes, in his 2012 book, Once Upon a Time in the Italian West, reflected by stating, "American and British critics largely chose to ignore Fistful's release, few recognizing its satirical humor or groundbreaking style, preferring to trash the shoddy production values".

A Fistful of Dollars has achieved a 98% approval rating from 55 critical reviews on Rotten Tomatoes, with an average rating of 8.3/10. The website's critical consensus reads: "With Akira Kurosawa's Yojimbo as his template, Sergio Leone's A Fistful of Dollars helped define a new era for the Western and usher in its most iconic star, Clint Eastwood." It has also placed at number 8 on the site's "Top 100 Westerns". Metacritic, which uses a weighted average, assigned the film a score of 65 out of 100, based on 7 critics, indicating "generally favorable" reviews.

The 67th Cannes Film Festival, held in 2014, celebrated the "50th anniversary of the birth of the spaghetti Western ... by showing A Fistful of Dollars".

== Legal dispute ==
The film was effectively an unofficial and unlicensed remake of Akira Kurosawa's 1961 film Yojimbo (written by Kurosawa and Ryūzō Kikushima); Kurosawa insisted that Leone had made "a fine movie, but it was my movie". This led to a lawsuit from Toho, Yojimbo's production company. Leone ignored the resulting lawsuit, but eventually settled out of court, reportedly for 15% of the worldwide receipts of A Fistful of Dollars and over $100,000.

The critic Christopher Frayling identifies three principal sources for A Fistful of Dollars: "Partly derived from Kurosawa's samurai film Yojimbo, partly from Dashiell Hammett's novel Red Harvest (1929), but most of all from Carlo Goldoni's eighteenth-century play Servant of Two Masters [sic]." Leone cited those alternative sources in his defense. He claimed a thematic debt, for both Fistful and Yojimbo, to Carlo Goldoni's Servant of Two Masters — the basic premise of the protagonist playing two camps against each other. Leone asserted that this rooted the origination of Fistful/Yojimbo in European, and specifically, Italian, culture. The plot of The Servant of Two Masters can also be seen in Hammett's detective novel, Red Harvest. The Continental Op hero of the novel is, significantly, a man without a name. Leone believed that Red Harvest had influenced Yojimbo: "Kurosawa's Yojimbo was inspired by an American novel of the series-noire so I was really taking the story back home again."

Leone also referenced numerous American Westerns in the film, most notably Shane and My Darling Clementine, both of which differ from Yojimbo.

== Digital restoration ==
In 2014, the film was digitally restored by Cineteca di Bologna and Unidis Jolly Film for its Blu-ray debut and 50th anniversary. Frame-by-frame digital restoration by Prasad Corporation removed dirt, tears, scratches and other defects. The directorial credit for Leone, which replaced the "Bob Robertson" card years ago, has been retained, but otherwise, the original credits (with pseudonyms, including "Dan Savio" for Morricone) remain the same.
