= Mario Bertoncini =

Italian composer, pianist, and music educator (1932–2019)

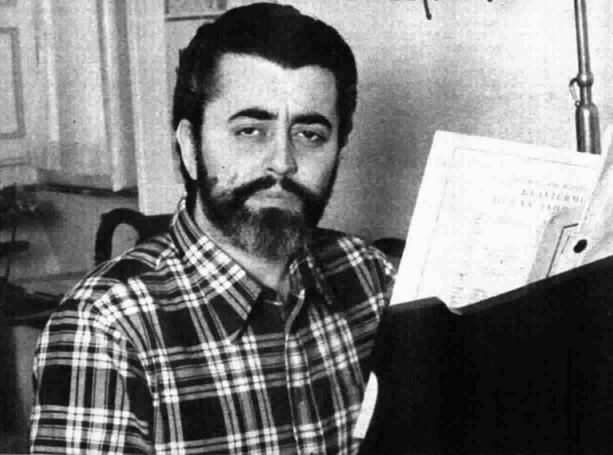
Mario Bertoncini in Radiocorriere magazine, 1975.

Mario Bertoncini (27 September 1932, in Rome – 19 January 2019, in Siena) was an Italian composer, pianist, and music educator. In 1962 he was awarded the Nicola d'Atri Prize by the Accademia Nazionale di Santa Cecilia for his Sei Pezzi per orchestra and in 1965 he was awarded both the Gaudeamus International Composers Award and the Fondation européenne de la Culture prize for Quodlibet. He has performed as a concert pianist with symphony orchestras throughout Europe and North America and in Israel and Korea.

== Life and career ==
Born in Rome, Bertoncini studied music composition with Goffredo Petrassi, piano with Rodolfo Caporali, and electronic music with Gottfried Michael Koenig. He began his career as a concert pianist in Europe in 1956. For several decades he performed widely as both a recitalist and orchestral soloist; appearing under the batons of such conductors as Bruno Maderna, Daniele Paris, Mario Rossi, Paul Hupperts, and Roelof Krol among others. He was a member of the Rome-based improvisation group Gruppo di Improvvisazione di Nuova Consonanza from 1965 to 1973; notably serving as the group's president from 1970 to 1972.

In 1967 Bertoncini was appointed to the music faculty of the Pesaro Conservatory, where he remained through 1973. In 1974 he was made an Artist-in-Residence at the German Academic Exchange Service in Berlin where he created open air kinetic sound-sculptures for presentation at the Berliner Festwochen. In 1975-1976 he worked on the music faculty of McGill University in Montréal. From 1980 until his retirement in 2004 he taught on the music faculty of the Berlin University of the Arts. His final home was in Cetona, Italy.
