= Riccardo Cucciolla =

Italian actor (1924–1999)

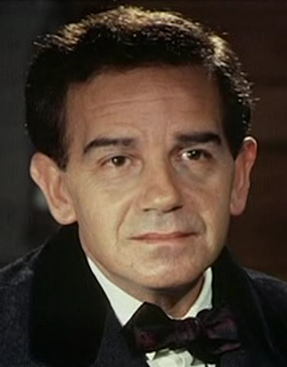
- Cucciolla in the movie Sacco & Vanzetti (1971)
- Born: 5 September 1924; Bari, Italy
- Died: 17 September 1999 (aged 75); Rome, Italy
- Occupations: Actor; voice actor; dubbing director
- Years active: 1953–1999
- Children: 3

Riccardo Cucciolla (5 September 1924 – 17 September 1999) was an Italian actor and voice actor. He appeared in 60 films between 1953 and 1999. He won the Best Actor Award at the 1971 Cannes Film Festival for the film Sacco & Vanzetti.

== Biography ==
Born in Bari, in southern Italy, Cucciolla gained a degree in law, then made his stage debut in an amateur production in his home city. From 1946, he started working in radio as a voice actor and as the narrator of documentaries; at the same time, he started working in cinema, as a dubber and a voice actor.

Cucciolla made his film debut in 1953, in Anton Giulio Majano's Good Folk's Sunday. After some minor roles, he had his first important role in Italiani brava gente (1965), followed by a further significant role in Giuliano Montaldo's Grand Slam (1967).

Cucciolla came to national and international recognition with the leading role in Montaldo's Sacco e Vanzetti, for which he was awarded best actor at Cannes and won a Silver Ribbon. In the wake of that sudden popularity, he intensively worked throughout the decade, alternating notable films with others of more modest quality and ambition. Starting from eighties he thinned out his appearances, mainly focusing on dubbing and television roles. As a dubber, he provided voice-overs for Roger Moore, Claudio Villa, Erland Josephson, John Cazale, Jonathan Pryce, Richard Egan, James Caan, Robert Duvall and more.

On 17 September 1999, Cucciolla died in Rome at the age of 75. He is survived by his wife, the poet Alida Sessa; their son Riccardo Mario Cucciolla (historian of the Soviet Union); and two children by his first wife, Francesco and Lietta.

== Selected filmography ==
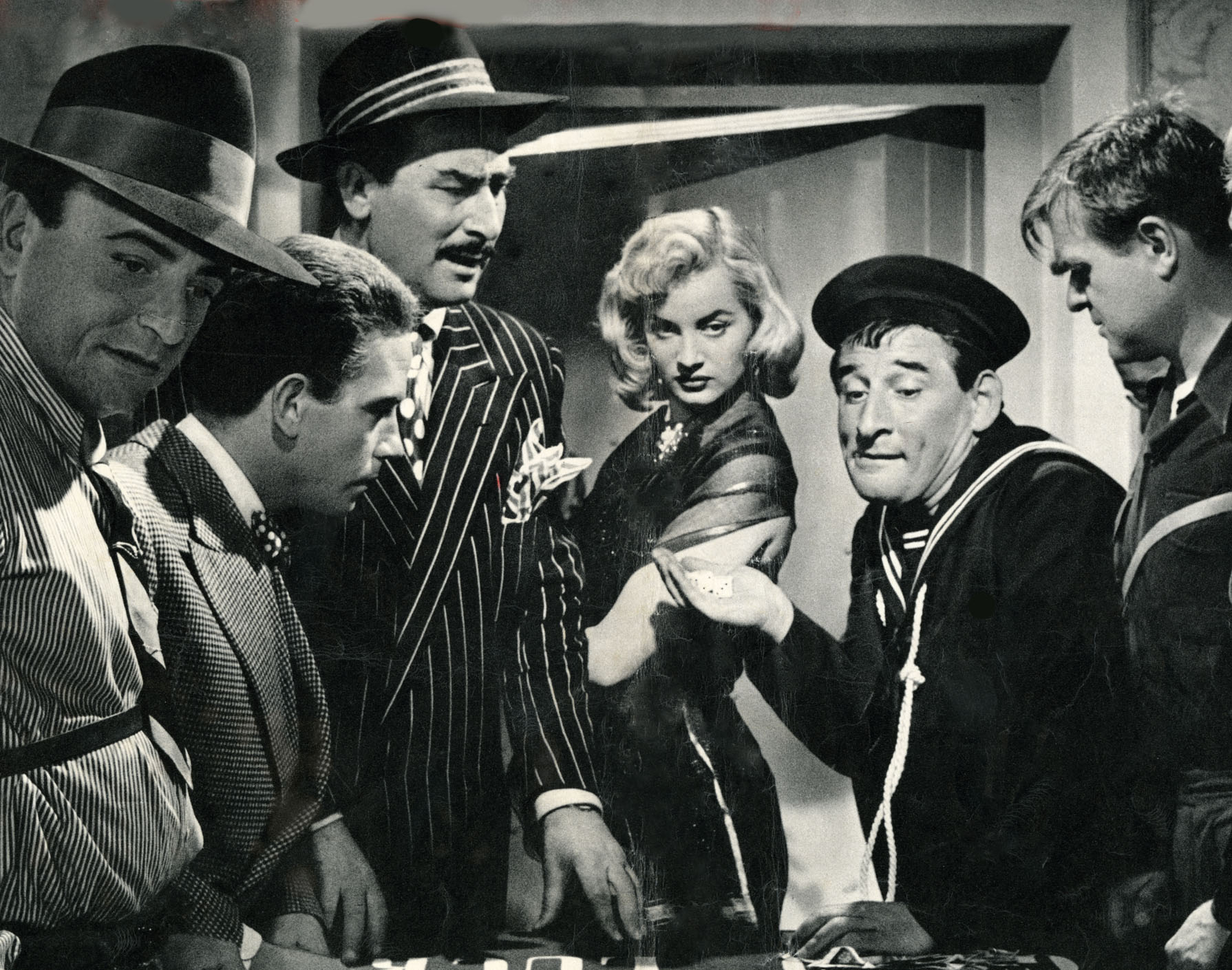
Cucciolla (second left) in Rascel-Fifì (1957)

- Good Folk's Sunday (1953) - Cesco
- I Vitelloni (1953) - Narrator (voice, uncredited)
- Il seduttore (1954) - Racca
- Il piccolo vetraio (1955) - (voice)
- Rascel-Fifì (1957) - Undici
- Silver Spoon Set (1960) - Anselmo Foresi (voice, uncredited)
- Love in Rome (1960) - Narrator (uncredited)
- Primitive Love (1964) - Narrator (uncredited)
- Attack and Retreat (1964) - Sanna
- Six Days a Week (1965)
- Grand Slam (1967) - Agostino Rossi
- The Seven Cervi Brothers (1968) - Gelindo Cervi
- Bandits in Rome (1968) - Vice Commissioner Pascuttini
- La rivoluzione sessuale (1968) - Emilio Missiroli
- Una sull'altra (1969) - Benjamin Wormser
- Giacomo Casanova: Childhood and Adolescence (1969) - Narratore (voice, uncredited)
- Sacco e Vanzetti (1971) - Nicola Sacco
- The Case Is Closed, Forget It (1971) - Pesenti
- We Are All in Temporary Liberty (1971) - Mario De Rossi
- The Sicilian Checkmate (1972) - Professor Salemi
- Un apprezzato professionista di sicuro avvenire (1972) - Nicola Perella
- Un flic (1972) - Paul Weber
- Incensurato provata disonestà carriera assicurata cercasi (1972) - Commissario
- The Assassination of Matteotti (1973) - Antonio Gramsci
- No, The Case Is Happily Resolved (1973) - Professor Eduardo Ranieri
- Paolo il caldo (1973) - Paolo's Father
- 24 ore... non un minuto di più (1973) - Minister Handras
- The Sensual Man (1974) - Celio D'Altamura
- Le Hasard et la Violence (1974) - Dr. Puget (uncredited)
- High School Girl (1974)
- Borsalino & Co. (1974) - Volpone
- Rabid Dogs (1974) - Riccardo
- The Last Day of School Before Christmas (1975) - Ambro
- C.I.A. Secret Story (1975) - Giuseppe Pinelli
- Il pleut sur Santiago (1975) - Olivares
- Il fratello (1975)
- La linea del fiume (1976) - Dr. Roder
- Take All of Me (1976) - Padre di Stella
- Meet Him and Die (1976) - Commissioner Sacchi
- Antonio Gramsci: The Days of Prison (1977) - Antonio Gramsci
- Turi and the Paladins (1979) - Don Saverio
- Il ragazzo di Ebalus (1984) - Old farmer
- The Assisi Underground (1985) - Luigi Brizzi
- Una casa in bilico (1986) - Teodoro detto Teo
- Il coraggio di parlare (1987) - Don Carmelo Fiorillo
- Remake (1987) - Himself
- 32 dicembre (1988) - Anselmi, lo spasimante (segment "La gialla farfalla")
- Il segreto dell'uomo solitario (1988)
- Vanille fraise (1989) - Andreani
- Pizza Colonia (1991) - Massimo Serboli
- In Calabria (1993) - Narrator (voice)
- L'Affaire (1994) - Van Doude
- La voce del cuore (1995, TV Mini-Series) - Antonio
- Lucky Punch (1996) - Zipolino
- Our God's Brother (1997) - The Monk

== Dubbing roles ==
=== Live action ===
- Fredo Corleone in The Godfather
- Fredo Corleone in The Godfather Part II
- Alexander in The Sacrifice
- Judge Cancedda in I Am Afraid
- Elliot Carver in Tomorrow Never Dies
- Lee Stegler in Countdown
- Mr. Hillyer in Rambling Rose
