= Rosanna Fratello =

Italian singer and actress

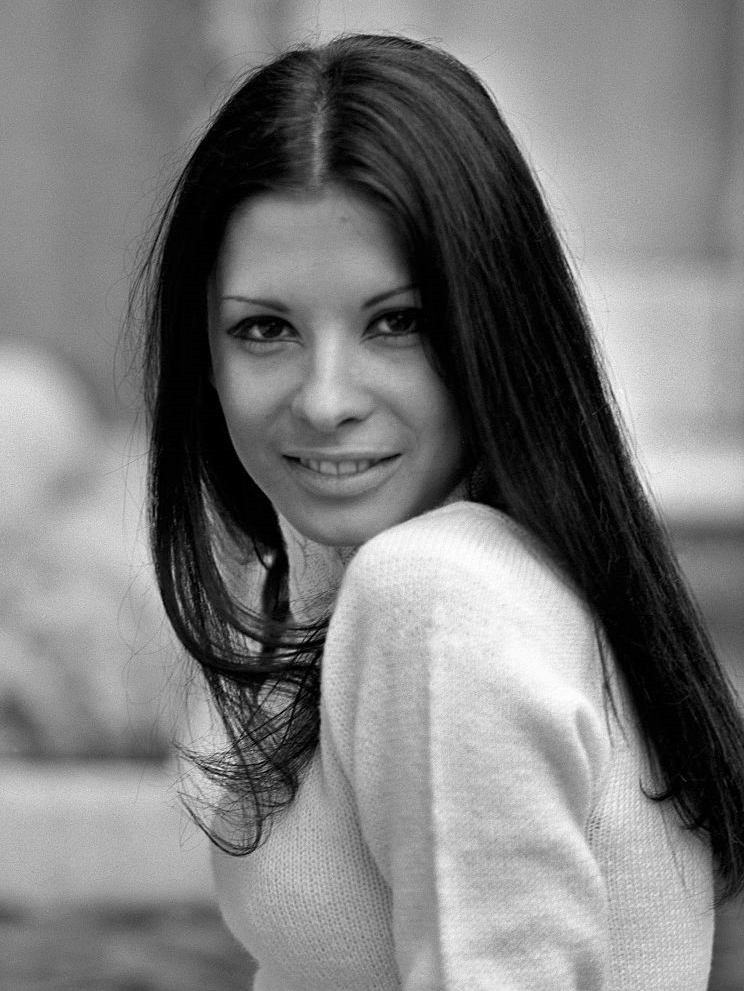
- Fratello in 1970
- Born: 26 March 1950 (age 76); San Severo, Foggia, Italy
- Occupations: Singer; actress
- Known for: Sacco e Vanzetti "Sono una donna, non sono una santa"
- Awards: Nastro d'Argento for Best New Actress, 1971

Rosanna Fratello (Italian pronunciation: [roˈzanna fraˈtɛllo]; born 26 March 1950) is an Italian singer and actress.

== Biography and career ==
Rosanna Fratello was born in San Severo, Foggia, and as a child she moved to Cinisello Balsamo, Milan, where she has grown up. Rosanna emerged as singer in 1969, when she took part at the Sanremo Music Festival with the song "Il treno" and obtained her first commercial success with the song "Non sono Maddalena".

In 1971, she made her debut as actress with the film Sacco e Vanzetti; for her performance she was awarded a Nastro d'Argento as best new actress. Her other roles were in the crime films The Black Hand (1973) and Cross Shot (1976).

In 1972, she topped the Hit Parade with her major success, the song "Sono una donna, non sono una santa"; in the following years she experimented with various genres such as disco music, folk music and Italo disco and competed in a number of Sanremo Festivals, but failed to repeat that success.

In 1985, Fratello took part in the musical project "Ro Bo T" together with Bobby Solo and Little Tony. In 1994, she came back to the Sanremo Music Festival with the supergroup Squadra Italia.

In 2023-2024, she participated in the seventeenth edition of Grande Fratello (the Italian version of Big Brother); as a result, her 1982 success "Se t'amo t'amo" (written by Cristiano Malgioglio) has become popular again.
