= Milagros (TV series) =

- Genre: Drama, Romance
- Created by: Delia Fiallo
- Developed by: América Televisión
- Starring: Roberto Mateos; Sonya Smith
- Opening theme: "El Milagro de Amar" by Jessyca Sarango
- Country of origin: Peru
- Original language: Spanish

Production
- Producer: José Enrique Crousillat
- Camera setup: Multi-camera

Original release
- Network: América Televisión
- Release: August 21, 2000 – August 3, 2001

Related
- Pobre Diabla; Soledad

Milagros is a Peruvian telenovela produced and broadcast by América Televisión in 2001.

== Plot ==
The novel tells us the story of two rival families: Echevarrías and De La Torres. One of the main heads of this last family, the evil Lucrecia, hires assassins led by Leoncio Peña "Jaguar" to annihilate all the Echevarría's in a social gathering they were having: Raquel Echevarría's wedding with John Wilson. The massacre occurs and the Echevarría clan ceases to exist in the midst of fire and blood. But there were two survivors: Raquel and her nephew José Antonio. As a result of the beating and rape suffered by Raquel by "Jaguar" moments before the fire, she becomes pregnant with Melissa. After what happened, Raquel becomes a cold woman with a desire for revenge.

On the other hand, Rafael De La Torre, Lucrecia's brother and highest authority in the De La Torre clan, has an affair with the family's servant, Chachita Vargas, who becomes pregnant and knowing that Rafael asks her to abort the baby, she leaves the house. of the family and gives birth in a convent. Minutes later, she dies, but not before asking the nuns to name the girl Milagros.

Over time, Milagros grows up and becomes a pretty, intelligent and enterprising girl, but she has a problem with her leg and finds out about her past. After Rafael's death in a car accident, he leaves in his will that his assets will remain in the hands of the bastard daughter he had, which causes great anger among the members of his family, especially Lucrecia, who was determined to get it all. At the same time, José Antonio is already an intelligent man and trained by his aunt Raquel, he infiltrates the De La Torre family, to begin with the revenge plan for the death of his family. But in his revenge he will find Milagros and love will quickly grow between them, even though a dark past is involved, full of death, pain and misfortune, not to mention the eternal confrontation between Lucrecia and Raquel, that will cause more than one misfortune around the protagonists. Finally, Milagros and José Antonio manage to be happy and end up getting married.

== Cast ==
- Sonya Smith ... Milagros de la Torre Vargas/ Chachita Vargas (Mother of Milagros)
- Roberto Mateos ... José Antonio Wilson Gómez / José Antonio Echevarria
- Yvonne Frayssinet ... Lucrecia De La Torre de Muñoz, Condesa de Santana del Sol (Main villain)
- Malena Elías ... Raquel Echevarría Romero Viuda de Wilson (Secondary villain)
- Juan Vitali ... Gerardo Bellido
- Roberto Vander ... Benjamin Muñoz, Conde de Santana del Sol
- Hugo Cosiansi ... Juan Bermúdez
- Karina Calmet ... Fernanda Muñoz De La Torre
- Virna Flores ... Lucía Muñoz De La Torre
- Gonzalo Revoredo ... Sebastián Muñoz De La Torre

Special appearance

- Alberto Ísola ... Rafael De La Torre (patriarch of De La Torre family, died of car accident)

Reparto

- Regina Alcóver ... Teresa Rosas de Bellido
- Reynaldo Arenas ... Leoncio Peña 'Jaguar'
- Norma Martínez ... Coca Ferrari
- Mirna Bracamonte ... Blanca Rivera de San Martín
- Hertha Cárdenas ... Consuelo Rivera
- Ana María Jordan ... Carlota de Avalos
- Atilia Boschetti ... Micaela 'Chela'
- Paul Martin ... Martín Bellido Rosas
- Ana Cecilia Natteri ... Margarita Manrique
- Ruth Razzeto ... Rosa de Bermúdez
- Carlos Mesta ... Celso / Benito López
- Tatiana Astengo ... Irene Ramírez 'Body'
- Gabriela Billotti ... Sofía Camino
- Saskia Bernaola ... Rossy Bermúdez
- Renato Rossini ... Juan Bermúdez Jr. 'Juanito'
- María Pía Ureta ... Mariana Avalos
- Mari Pili Barreda ... Raquel Echevarría (young) / Melissa Wilson Echevarría (Sister / cousin of José Antonio)
- William Bell Taylor ... Pablo San Martín
- Melania Urbina ... Macerena San Martín
- Jesús Delaveaux ... Jesús Rivera
- Rafael Santa Cruz ... Godofredo 'Godo' del Aguila
- Paco Varela ... Sergio Zarate
- Fabrizio Aguilar ... Renzo Malatesta
- Nadia Berdichevsky ... Silvia Zapata
- Milagros Cabanillas ... Marcela Cordoba
- Roger Del Aguila ... Felipe Guzmán 'Pipo'
- Irene Eyzaguirre ... Teodora Cardenas
- Marissa Minetti ... Claudia Rosales
- Andrea Montenegro ... Erika Zevallos
- Milene Vásquez ... Paloma Manrique
- Milagros Vidal ... Rene
- Bernie Paz ... Gringo Belauchaga
- Fernando de Soria ... Peter Farfán
- Fernando Pasco ... Rambo
- Rodrigo Sánchez Patiño ... Robin
- Carlos Tuccio ... Bernardo
- Javier Valdez ... Gabriel
- Javier Delgiudice ... father of José Antonio, brother of Raquel
- Ricardo Mejía ... Homero López Rabanal 'Gordo'
