= Crossing a Shadow =

2007 film by Augusto Tamayo

Una sombra al frente
- Theatrical release poster
- Directed by: Augusto Tamayo San Román
- Written by: Augusto Tamayo San Román
- Produced by: Augusto Tamayo San Román
- Starring: Diego Bertie; Vanessa Saba; Carlos Carlín; Alberto Ísola; Paul Vega; Gianfranco Brero
- Cinematography: Juan Durán
- Edited by: Martín Haro; Cinthia McKenzie
- Music by: Victor Villavicencio
- Production companies: Argos Producciones Audiovisuales (Peru); ICAIC (Cuba); Filmocentro Sonido (Chile)
- Distributed by: Argos Producciones Audiovisuales
- Release date: 13 September 2007
- Running time: 135 minutes
- Countries: Peru; Chile; Cuba
- Language: Spanish

Crossing a Shadow (Spanish: Una sombra al frente) is a 2007 Peruvian historical drama film directed and written by Augusto Tamayo. It was Peru's submission to the 80th Academy Awards for Academy Award for Best Foreign Language Film, but was not accepted as a nominee.

== See also ==
- Cinema of Peru
- List of submissions to the 80th Academy Awards for Best Foreign Language Film
