= Here's to You (song) =

1971 song by Joan Baez and Ennio Morricone

Single by Joan Baez and Ennio Morricone

from the album Sacco e Vanzetti
- B-side: "The Ballad of Sacco & Vanzetti – Part 2"
- Released: 1971
- Recorded: 1971
- Genre: Folk; political
- Length: 3:06
- Label: RCA Victor
- Composer: Ennio Morricone
- Lyricist: Joan Baez

Joan Baez singles chronology
"The Night They Drove Old Dixie Down" (1971)	"Here's to You" (1971)	"Let It Be" (1971)

"Here's to You" is a song by Ennio Morricone and Joan Baez, released in 1971 as part of the soundtrack of the film Sacco & Vanzetti, directed by Giuliano Montaldo. The lyrics consist of only four lines, sung over and over. The song became a freedom anthem, sung in demonstrations and featured in other media.

== Background ==
The song is a tribute to two anarchists of Italian origin, Nicola Sacco and Bartolomeo Vanzetti who were sentenced to death by a United States court in the 1920s. Mainstream opinion has concluded since that the ruling was based on abhorrence to their anarchist political beliefs rather than on any proof that they committed the robbery and murders of which they were accused.

The lyrics for "Here's to You" make use of a statement attributed to Vanzetti by Philip D. Stong, then a reporter for the North American Newspaper Alliance, who visited Vanzetti in prison in May 1927, three months before his execution.

If it had not been for these things, I might have lived out my life talking at street corners to scorning men. I might have died, unmarked, unknown, a failure. Now we are not a failure. This is our career and our triumph. Never in our full life we could have hoped to do such work for tolerance, for justice, for man's understanding of man as we now do by accident. Our words—our lives—our pains—nothing! The taking of our lives—lives of a good shoemaker and a poor fish peddler—all! That last moment belongs to us—that agony is our triumph.

== Lyrics ==
Here's to you, Nicola and Bart
Rest forever here in our hearts
The last and final moment is yours
That agony is your triumph.

== Legacy ==
The song became an anthem of freedom, used in demonstrations, films, and video games.

"Here's to You" was included in other films. In the 1978 film Germany in Autumn, it accompanies footage of the funeral for Red Army Faction members Andreas Baader, Gudrun Ensslin, and Jan-Carl Raspe, who had committed suicide in prison, under suspicious circumstances.

The song is used in the 2004 film The Life Aquatic with Steve Zissou.

The song also appears in the opening sequence as well as the credits of the 2014 video game Metal Gear Solid V: Ground Zeroes produced by Hideo Kojima; a cover version is also used as the end theme for its predecessor Metal Gear Solid 4: Guns of the Patriots (2008), which was also directed by Kojima.

=== Cover versions ===
In 1972 the German songwriter Franz Josef Degenhardt sang the song under the title "Sacco und Vanzetti", with five verses. The Israeli singer Daliah Lavi sang it in English, French and German. Swedish singer-songwriter Agnetha Fältskog recorded the song in German and released it as a single in 1972, entitled "Geh' mit Gott". Another German cover version in Colognian dialect titled "Die Stadt" [The Town] was created and sung by Trude Herr in 1987 and later by the group Höhner.

The Italian version of the song is titled "Ho visto un film" sang by Gianni Morandi and originally released in 1971.

The French version of the song is titled "La Marche de Sacco et Vanzetti". It was written and recorded by Greek folk artist Georges Moustaki. It was Baez herself who asked him to adapt it to French. When Moustaki sang it live, he often mixed the French and English lyrics. The French version was later covered by others including popular singer Mireille Mathieu.

British composer Harry Gregson-Williams orchestrated a cover of "Here's to You", featuring vocals by Lisbeth Scott. This version is heard during the end credits of the 2008 game Metal Gear Solid 4: Guns of the Patriots. In 2011, Bandista covered the song with the name "Selam size" on their album Daima!. Hayley Westenra and Ennio Morricone performed "Here's To You" on the album Paradiso, released in 2011 and nominated for a 2012 Classic Brit Award. Corsica-based band L'Arcusgi used "Here's to You" music in their 2011 song "Alba Nova" (in Corsican "A New Dawn").

In 2011 Tunisian musician Emel Mathlouthi covered the song in Arabic for the memory of Mohamed Bouazizi, a Tunisian street vendor who set himself on fire on December 17, 2010, an act which became a catalyst for the Tunisian Revolution and the wider Arab Spring against autocratic regimes.
