= Roland Kayn =

Composer of electronic music

Roland Kayn (born 3 September 1933 in Reutlingen, Germany; died 5 January 2011 in Nieuwe Pekela, Netherlands) was a composer of electronic music. He is known for his lengthy works of cybernetic music.

From 1952 to 1955 he studied composition and organ at the State University of Music and Performing Arts Stuttgart. From 1956 to 1958 he studied with Boris Blacher and Josef Rufer in Berlin. After 1960 he lived in Rome and then in Venice. In 1964 he co-founded the free improvisation group Gruppo di Improvvisazione Nuova Consonanza. Beginning in 1970 he worked at the Institute of Sonology in Utrecht, (which later moved to The Hague) and lived in the Netherlands until his death in 2011. In 1995 he created the label Reiger-records-reeks to release his own works.

His 14-hour composition A Little Electronic Milky Way of Sound (2009) was released on 16 CDs in October 2017 by the Finnish label Frozen Reeds. Since May 2020, the Kayn estate has released a recording every month on the digital distribution platform Bandcamp. At the current rate, they estimate that it will take 20 years for his complete catalog to be released. Since 2017, releases have been restored and mastered by Jim O'Rourke.

== Discography ==
=== Physical Releases ===
- 1977 – Simultan (Colosseum, 3 LPs)
- 1977 – Elektroakustische Projekte (Colosseum, 3 LPs)
- 1981 – Makro I–III (Colosseum, 3 LPs)
- 1981 – Infra (Colosseum, 4 LPs)
- 1984 – Tektra (Colosseum, 6 LPs)
- 1994 – Keyboard-Works 1 (Reiger-records-reeks, 2 CDs)
- 1995 – Works for Orchestra / Ensemble (RRR, 2 CDs)
- 1995 – Cybernetic Music (RRR, 2 CDs)
- 1997 – Cybernetic Music II (RRR, 1 CD)
- 1996 – Cybernetic Music III (RRR, 2 CDs)
- 1997 – Electronic Symphony I–III / Equivalence Sonore II–III (RRR, 2 CDs)
- 1998 – Electronic Symphony IV / Frottage – Minimax (RRR, 2 CDs)
- 1998 – Electronic Symphony V / Emissioni trasformati I–II (RRR, 2 CDs)
- 1999 – Electronic Symphony VI–VII / Frottage II (RRR, 2 CDs)
- 2000 – Electronic Symphony VIII–X (RRR, 2 CDs)
- 2000 – Gärten der Lüste / Cybernetics II / L’innominata (RRR, 2 CDs)
- 2003 – Ultra / Redunancy TR / Megaphonie (RRR, 2 CDs)
- 2004 – Requiem pour Patrice Lumumba / Interations / Composizione AD / Prismes Reflectes (RRR, 2 CDs)
- 2005 – Etoile du nord / Ghyress für Ilse-Emily Kayn (RRR, 2 CDs)
- 2006 – Invisible Music / Hommage à K.R.H. Sonderborg (RRR, 2 CDs)
- 2017 – A Little Electronic Milky Way of Sound (Frozen Reeds, 16 CDs)
- 2019 – Scanning (RRR, 10 CDs)
- 2024 – The Ortho-Project (Frozen Reeds, 15 CDs)
- 2025 – Elektroakustische Projekte & Makro (RRR, 5 CDs)

=== Digital Releases ===
2020

- The Man and the Biosphere
- Music for the Isle of Man
- Made in the NL After the Sixties and Beyond
- Sound-Hydra
- November Music
- Dino Concerto
- A Pan-Air Music

2021

- Electronic Symphony I–III
- Matego I–II
- Electronic Symphony IV
- Accumulation
- Electronic Symphony V
- Xutus
- Electronic Symphony VI & VII
- Spectral
- Reflets du Spectral
- Extensity
- Zone Senza Silenzio
- Remake A
- Remake B
- Transit
- Cybernet AS & TLS
- Agila
- An Algorithm MA 71

2022

- Impactions
- The Art of Sound
- Triades
- Contra-Compositie
- De-Compositie
- Atix
- Reversioni Comprimati
- Abstracta
- Mutenaces
- Cyber Panoramical Music
- Sonority ERT
- Audiogenic Events

2023

- Otron
- Yellowings Conglomerations
- Rathan
- Ghyress
- Actual Basic Elements
- Oktrol
- Constellations
- Decares
- Sorales I
- Sorales II
- Superficies
- Residual Sounds
- La Ranar

2024

- Hybriditys
- Demodulations
- Athary NLX
- TLS
- Random Distributions
- Electronic Stabile
- Areals
- Textures
- Les Characées
- Break Rotations
- Metaphysis
- Configurations

2025

- Canthara
- Dispersions
- Sezarytes
- Othyrsis
- La Manerale
- Osmotic Sounds
- TLX
- The Segmentry Fields
- Kalamarho
- Cyrales
- Extary I
- Extary II

2026

- Easy Music
- Les Variales
- Les Spirales
- Raccan
- Pericycles
- Cascades
- Réafférances
- Syrites
- Sinotron
- Darano
- Devirations
