= The Law (1959 film) =

1959 film

- Theatrical release poster
- Directed by: Jules Dassin
- Written by: Diego Fabbri; Françoise Giroud; Jules Dassin
- Based on: La Loi (1957 novel) by Roger Vailland
- Produced by: Jacques Bar; Maleno Malenotti
- Starring: Gina Lollobrigida; Yves Montand; Pierre Brasseur; Marcello Mastroianni
- Cinematography: Otello Martelli
- Edited by: Roger Dwyre; Mario Serandrei
- Music by: Roman Vlad
- Production companies: Le Groupe des Quatre; Cité Films; Titanus; G.E.S.I. Cinematografica
- Distributed by: Les Films Corona
- Release date: 25 January 1959
- Running time: 126 minutes
- Countries: Italy; France
- Languages: English; French; Italian
- Budget: FRF 450,000,000 (estimated)
- Box office: $1,075,000

The Law (Italian: La legge, French: La Loi and originally released in America as Where the Hot Wind Blows) is a 1959 French-Italian film directed by Jules Dassin.

== Plot ==
Beautiful Marietta is a small-town girl who lives in southern Italian fishing village of Porto Manacore, a corrupt village ruled by a petty crook Matteo Brigante. An engineer, Enrico Tosso comes into town to drain the marshes, and helps the villagers to take back their town.

== Cast ==
- Gina Lollobrigida as Marietta
- Pierre Brasseur as Don Cesare
- Marcello Mastroianni as Enrico Tosso, the Engineer
- Melina Mercouri as Donna Lucrezia
- Yves Montand as Matteo Brigante
- Raf Mattioli as Francesco Brigante
- Vittorio Caprioli as Attilio, the Inspector
- Lydia Alfonsi as Giuseppina
- Gianrico Tedeschi as First Loafer
- Nino Vingelli as Pizzaccio
- Bruno Carotenuto as Balbo
- Luisa Rivelli as Elvira
- Anna Maria Bottini as Maria
- Anna Arena as Anna, Attilio's wife
- Edda Soligo as Giulia
- Joe Dassin as Nico

== Production ==
The shooting took place in particular in the Gargano: precisely in Carpino, while some scenes were shot in Rodi Garganico, Ischitella, Peschici and San Menaio. The locality "Baia di Manacore" really exists a short distance from Peschici. It is one of the first films shot on the Gargano promontory. If in the novel and in the French version the story is set in the Gargano, in the Italian version the setting of the story is moved to Corsica.

== Reception ==
On review aggregator website Rotten Tomatoes, the film holds an approval rating of 60% based on 5 reviews.

== Box office ==
According to MGM records the film earned $750,000 in the US and Canada and $325,000 elsewhere, resulting in a net loss to the studio of $39,000.
