= Violent City =

1970 film directed by Sergio Sollima

- Italian film poster by Tino Avelli
- Italian: Città violenta
- Directed by: Sergio Sollima
- Screenplay by: Sauro Scavolini; Gianfranco Calligarich; Lina Wertmüller; Sergio Sollima
- Story by: Dino Maiuri; Massimo De Rita
- Produced by: Arrigo Colombo; Giorgio Papi
- Starring: Charles Bronson; Telly Savalas; Jill Ireland; Umberto Orsini; Michel Constantin
- Cinematography: Aldo Tonti
- Edited by: Nino Baragli
- Music by: Ennio Morricone
- Production companies: Unidis; Fono Roma; Jolly Film; Universal Productions France
- Distributed by: Universal Pictures
- Release dates: 17 September 1970 (Italy); 16 October 1970 (France)
- Running time: 104 minutes
- Countries: Italy; France
- Language: English
- Box office: ₤950.623 million

Violent City (Italian: Città violenta, also released as The Family) is a 1970 crime thriller film directed by Sergio Sollima from a screenplay co-written with Lina Wertmüller, starring Charles Bronson, Jill Ireland, Telly Savalas, Umberto Orsini and Michel Constantin. Bronson plays a former hitman framed by a former boss and left for dead. He seeks revenge, but realizes his real enemy may be closer than he thinks.

The Italian-French co-production was filmed in New Orleans, the U.S. Virgin Islands, and Cinecittà Studios in Rome. It was released in Italy by Universal Pictures on September 17, 1970.

== Plot ==
Professional assassin Jeff Heston and his lover Vanessa are holidaying in the Virgin Islands, when they are set upon by thugs led by Jeff's former associate Jerry Coogan. Jeff is shot and left for dead, while Vanessa seemingly runs off with Coogan. Jeff is imprisoned for the shooting and visited by Steve, a lawyer for crime boss Al Weber, Jeff's previous boss. Jeff refuses to disclose Vanessa's involvement as a potential exonerating witness, even if it means a longer sentence for him.

Months later, Jeff is released and travels to New Orleans, where he's immediately accosted by thugs working for Weber, who wants him to come work for him again. Jeff refuses, saying he's retired. With the help of his old friend Killain, a drug-addicted hitman, Jeff tracks down Coogan at a motor race where he is a driver. Jeff kills Coogan by shooting out one of his tires, causing a fiery crash, while taking precautions to avoid being seen.

Jeff reunites with Vanessa at a debutante ball. At first, he's harsh and confrontational with her, upset that she didn't disclose that she was Coogan's former mistress, and that she left him for dead. She says she only did it because she was afraid, and wants to rekindle their relationship. They decide to leave town together, but Jeff is stopped by Weber's thugs carrying incriminating photos of him killing Coogan.

Under blackmail, Jeff finally takes a meeting with Weber, who has grown his criminal enterprise into a semi-legitimate, billion-dollar business predicated on finance instead of violence and wants Jeff to work for him as his hatchet man. Steve likewise offers Jeff a lucrative job in Venezuela, but he refuses them both. Weber shocks him by revealing that Vanessa is actually his wife, the two having eloped while Jeff was imprisoned.

Jeff confronts Vanessa at her hideaway in the wetlands. After rough sex, he takes her out into the woods with plans to kill her. She catches on, and only asks that he makes it quick and painless. He relents, and the two embrace. She tells him she only married Weber for security and despises him. The two are ambushed by Killain, but Jeff shoots and kills him. He realizes Weber must have sent him to kill Vanessa.

The two confront Weber in his office, destroying the photo negatives of the incriminating pictures. When Vanessa leaves the room, Weber tells him she's playing them both, and will betray him soon enough. Disbelieving, Jeff kills Weber. But when he reaches their rendezvous, Vanessa isn't there, and the police arrive shortly thereafter. Realizing he's been double-crossed, he narrowly flees law enforcement.

It's revealed that Vanessa and Steve had orchestrated everything to eliminate Weber and take over his organization, Jeff was just another convenient pawn in their game. As they ride the elevator up their new skyscraper, Jeff shoots Steve with a sniper rifle from a rooftop across the street. Vanessa cries out for Jeff to "make it painless," and he kills her instantly with a bullet to the head. Police converge on the rooftop, and Jeff provokes a rookie officer into killing him.

== Cast ==
- Charles Bronson as Jeff Heston
- Telly Savalas as Al Weber
- Jill Ireland as Vanessa Shelton
- Michel Constantin as Killain
- Umberto Orsini as Steve
- George Savalas as Shapiro
- Ray Saunders as Older Cellmate
- Benjamin Lev as Younger Cellmate
- Peter Dane as Tom Shandy
- Arnold Williams as Jerome
- Iver Gilborn as Sherman

Sports racers Stirling Moss, Denny Hulme, and Jo Siffert make uncredited cameo appearances during the motor race sequence.

== Production ==
=== Writing ===
Director Sergio Sollima was initially unenthusiastic about the treatment he was given for Violent City, stating that "the story was rather bad and rhetorical: a love story, a hitman who falls in love, nothing extraordinary. But we had the chance to shoot in the U.S., and I would do whatever it took to do that." He rewrote the screenplay with filmmaker Lina Wertmüller, incorporating a non-linear flashback structure that was not present in the original draft.

=== Casting ===
After Jon Voight and Sharon Tate were initially considered for the leading roles of Jeff and Vanessa, Sollima and producer Arrigo Colombo settled on Tony Musante and Florinda Bolkan. Eventually, Charles Bronson was sent the script for the role of Jeff; he accepted on the condition that his wife Jill Ireland be cast as Vanessa.

Although he enjoyed working with them, Sollima admitted to finding Bronson and Ireland to be a "curious" couple and noted the differences in their backgrounds and personalities, especially Bronson's uncommunicativeness. He also enjoyed working with Telly Savalas as he believed that other directors had failed to utilize the actor's penchant for humor, but was surprised that Savalas and Bronson shared little off-screen rapport.

=== Filming ===
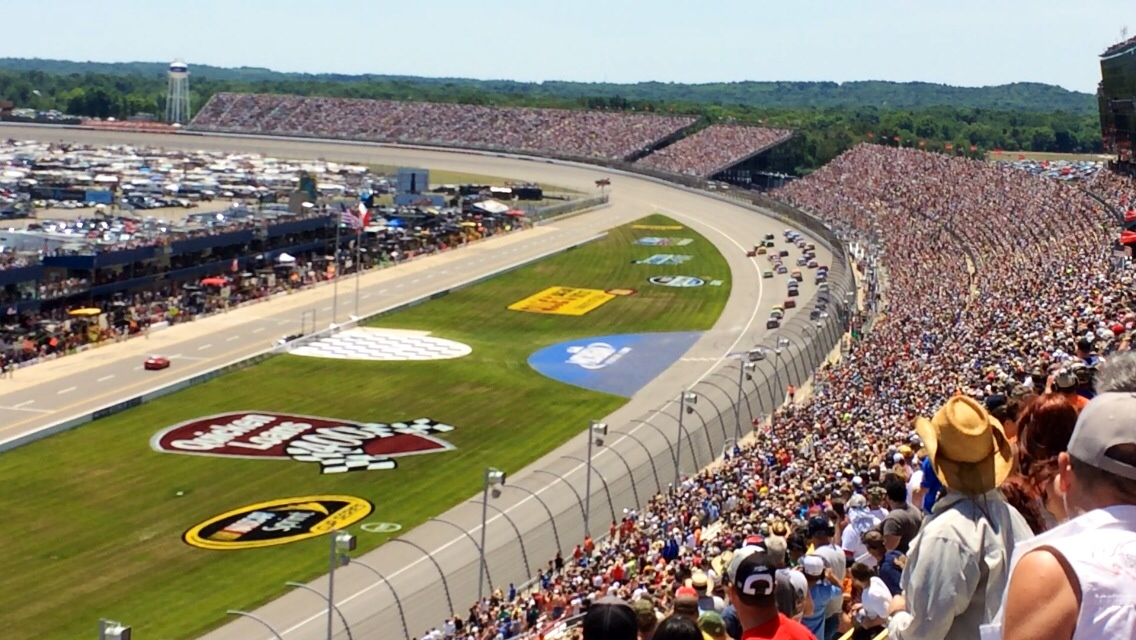
The Michigan International Speedway, one of the film's notable locations.

Violent City was shot primarily on location in New Orleans and Saint Thomas in the Virgin Islands, while interiors were shot at Cinecittà in Rome. The film's opening car chase in the streets of Saint Thomas was performed by Rémy Julienne; when Bronson asked the director if he was influenced by Bullitt during the shooting of this sequence, he claimed that he was instead reprising a similar chase he had created for his earlier film Agent 3S3: Massacre in the Sun.

Describing New Orleans as a "magical city", Sollima was driven to take its various cultures into account when choosing locations, such as a neighborhood that had suffered property damage in the wake of a race riot, which the production office was hesitant about filming in. The racing sequence was shot at the real Michigan International Can-Am of the 1969 Can-Am season, at the Michigan International Speedway in Brooklyn. Several of the real racers, including Stirling Moss; Denny Hulme, and Jo Siffert, make cameo appearances.

The film's finale was shot in three different locations: the rooftop from which Jeff fires from was in New Orleans, the exterior of the building he fires at was in San Francisco, and the interior of the elevator ridden by Vanessa and Killain was a set in Cinecittà. Although Ennio Morricone composed a score for this sequence, Sollima ultimately chose to have the scene play without music or sound effects aside from those of Jeff's shots hitting the glass of the elevator.

Carlo Rambaldi contributed some uncredited special effects, creating an animatronic tarantula for the jail cell sequence.

== Themes ==
Comparing Violent City to his earlier Spaghetti Westerns, Sollima noted that the film repeats a primary thematic concern of those films: that of "the encounter and struggle between the individual and the society which is all around him, and the way he reacts to it".

== Release ==
Violent City was released as Bronson was emerging from his career as a character actor into a period of stardom as a leading man; Sollima noted that while Bronson was a star in Europe at the time of the film's production, he was less popular with American audiences than Savalas, and suggested that this may have affected the film's commercial performance. In Italy, the film was distributed by Universal Pictures on September 17, 1970; it grossed a total of 950,652,000 Italian lire during its initial domestic run, and was less successful than Sollima's Spaghetti Westerns. It was released in Paris on October 16, 1970, as La cite de la violence, with Bronson dubbed into French by Claude Bertrand.

In the United States, Violent City was first released in April 1973 by International Co-Productions, during which it was retitled The Family to capitalize on the success of The Godfather, and later saw a wider release by United Artists. The English-dubbed version of the film runs eight minutes shorter than the original Italian prints.

=== Home media ===
Violent City was released on DVD by Anchor Bay Entertainment, and later Blue Underground; both releases restore the scenes excised from the English version but, because they were not dubbed into English at the time, they are presented in their original Italian language with English subtitles.

A remastered Blu-Ray was released by Kino Lorber on May 17, 2022.

== Reception ==
=== Critical response ===
From retrospective reviews, Italian film historian and critic Roberto Curti noted that the film had a "bare-bones story" with a style heavily borrowed from American hard-boiled films, specifically John Boorman's Point Blank. He felt that Sollima devised several "extraordinary scenes", namely the introductory car chases that were completely devoid of dialogue, and Jeff's final revenge. In an otherwise mixed review of the 2008 DVD release, Eric Henderson of Slant Magazine also singled out the opening car chase for praise, claiming that it almost outdoes those of Bullitt and The French Connection "by staging its engine-revving, pedestrian-dodging antics not on the wide streets of American cities but, rather, the narrow, winding pathways (and, in one case, staircases) of a Caribbean island."

=== Legacy ===
In a 2010 interview, Danish film director Nicolas Winding Refn cited Violent City as his favorite Italian film.

== See also ==
- New Orleans in fiction
