= The Good, the Bad and the Ugly (soundtrack) =

1966 soundtrack album by Ennio Morricone

The Good, The Bad and The Ugly: Original Motion Picture Soundtrack

Soundtrack album by Ennio Morricone
- Released: 1966 (original album); 2004 (remastered, expanded)
- Genre: Contemporary classical
- Length: 33:13 (original release); 53:03 (2004 re-release); 172:38 (2020 re-release)
- Labels: EMI America; Capitol Records; Quartet Records (2020 expansion)
- Producer: Ennio Morricone

Professional ratings
Review scores
Source	Rating
AllMusic	link
Blender	link
SoundtrackNet	link
Music from the Movies	5/5 stars

The Good, the Bad and the Ugly: Original Motion Picture Soundtrack was released in 1966 alongside the Western film The Good, the Bad and the Ugly, directed by Sergio Leone. The score is composed by frequent Leone collaborator Ennio Morricone, whose distinctive original compositions, containing gunfire, whistling, and yodelling permeate the film. The main theme, resembling the howling of a coyote, is a two-note melody that is a frequent motif, and is used for the three main characters, with a different instrument used for each one: flute for Blondie, arghilofono for Angel Eyes, and human voices for Tuco.

Among other elements, the score complements the film's American Civil War scenes, containing the mournful ballad "The Story of a Soldier", which is sung by prisoners as Tuco is being tortured by Angel Eyes. The film's famous climax, a three-way Mexican standoff, begins with the melody of "The Ecstasy of Gold" and is followed by "The Trio".

The main theme was a hit in 1968. The soundtrack album was on the charts for more than a year, reaching No. 4 on the Billboard pop album chart and No. 10 on the black album chart. The main theme was also a hit for American musician Hugo Montenegro, whose rendition on the Moog synthesizer was a No. 2 Billboard pop single in 1968. In 2008, the score was featured in the Grammy Museum at L.A. Live.

The album was remastered and re-released on Capitol Records on 18 May 2004, which had ten additional musical cues from the film. A European release by GDM music in 2001 contains even more music, with a running time of 59:30. In 2020, a three-disc release presenting the complete score and the original album was issued by the Spanish label Quartet Records.

== Track listings ==
All works composed by Ennio Morricone.

Original release date: 29 December 1966
Audio CD release date: 25 October 1990

Original release
No.	Title	Length
1.	"The Good, the Bad and the Ugly (main title)"	2:38
2.	"The Sundown"	1:12
3.	"The Strong"	2:20
4.	"The Desert"	5:11
5.	"The Carriage of the Spirits"	2:06
6.	"Marcia"	2:49
7.	"The Story of a Soldier"	3:50
8.	"Marcia Without Hope"	1:40
9.	"The Death of a Soldier"	3:05
10.	"The Ecstasy of Gold"	3:22
11.	"The Trio (main title)"	5:00
Total length:		33:13

2001 extended release (GDM Music)
No.	Title	Length
1.	"Il Buono, Il Cattivo, Il Brutto (Titoli)"	2:38
2.	"Il Tramonto"	1:14
3.	"Sentenza" (*)	1:39
4.	"Fuga A Cavallo" (*)	1:05
5.	"Il Ponte Di Corde" (*)	1:51
6.	"Il Forte"	2:19
7.	"Inseguimento" (*)	2:22
8.	"Il Deserto"	5:14
9.	"La Carrozza Dei Fantasmi"	2:06
10.	"La Missione San Antonio" (*)	2:13
11.	"Padre Ramirez" (*)	2:36
12.	"Marcetta"	2:49
13.	"La Storia Di Un Soldato"	5:30
14.	"Il Treno Militare" (*)	1:22
15.	"Fine Di Una Spia" (*)	1:12
16.	"Il Bandito Monco" (*)	2:43
17.	"Due Contro Cinque" (*)	3:45
18.	"Marcetta Senza Speranza"	1:48
19.	"Morte Di Un Soldato"	3:07
20.	"L'Estasi Dell'Oro"	3:23
21.	"Il Triello" (*) (**)	7:14
Total length:		59:30

2004 remaster (Capitol Records)
No.	Title	Length
1.	"Il Buono, Il Cattivo, Il Brutto (The Good, the Bad and the Ugly) (main title)" (2004 digital remaster)	2:41
2.	"Il Tramonto (The Sundown)" (2004 digital remaster)	1:15
3.	"Sentenza"	1:41
4.	"Fuga A Cavallo"	1:07
5.	"Il Ponte Di Corde"	1:51
6.	"Il Forte (The Strong)" (2004 digital remaster)	2:22
7.	"Inseguimento"	2:25
8.	"Il Deserto (The Desert)" (2004 digital remaster)	5:16
9.	"La Carrozza Dei Fantasmi (The Carriage of the Spirits)" (2004 digital remaster)	2:09
10.	"La Missione San Antonio"	2:15
11.	"Padre Ramirez"	2:36
12.	"Marcetta (Marcia)" (2004 digital remaster)	2:52
13.	"La Storia Di Un Soldato (The Story of a Soldier)" (2004 digital remaster)	3:53
14.	"Il Treno Militare"	1:25
15.	"Fine Di Una Spia"	1:16
16.	"Il Bandito Monco"	2:45
17.	"Due Contro Cinque"	3:46
18.	"Marcetta Senza Speranza (Marcia Without Hope)" (2004 digital remaster)	1:40
19.	"Morte Di Un Soldato (The Death of a Soldier)" (2004 digital remaster)	3:08
20.	"L'Estasi Dell'Oro (The Ecstasy of Gold)" (2004 digital remaster)	3:23
21.	"Il Triello (The Trio - main title)" (2004 digital remaster)	5:02
Total length:		53:03

(*) tracks previously unreleased on the original album issued in 1966.
(**) this track is extended and features music previously only heard in the film version of this piece, namely the original ending. The last part of this song is in mono.

== Personnel ==
- Ennio Morricone – composer
- Bruno Nicolai – conductor
- Unione Musicisti di Roma – orchestra
- I Cantori Moderni di Alessandroni – chorus
- Edda Dell'Orso, Franco Cosacchi, Nino Dei, Enzo Gioieni, Gianna Spagnulo – vocals
- Alessandro Alessandroni – whistling
- Italo Cammarota – arghilofono
- Nicola Samale – flute
- E. Wolf Ferrari – english horn
- Michele Lacerenza, Francesco Catania – trumpet
- Pino Rucher – electric guitar
- Bruno Battisti D'Amario – classical guitar
- Franco De Gemini – harmonica
- Pierino Munari – percussion

== Certifications ==
Region	Certification	Certified units/sales
United States (RIAA)	Gold	1,000,000^{^}
^{^} Shipments figures based on certification alone.
