= The Diary of Sacco and Vanzetti =

- DVD cover art
- Directed by: David Rothauser
- Written by: David Rothauser
- Produced by: David Rothauser; Rob W. Gray
- Starring: David Rothauser
- Cinematography: Paul Taggart; Russ Jaquith
- Edited by: Russ Jaquith; Chi-Ho Lee
- Music by: John T. LaBarbera
- Production company: Memory Productions
- Release date: January 27, 2004
- Running time: 57 minutes
- Country: United States
- Language: English

The Diary of Sacco and Vanzetti is a 2004 American docudrama, written and directed by David Rothauser, about the trial of Sacco and Vanzetti and an account of Vanzetti's life from the moment of his arrival as an immigrant in the United States, to the events leading to his execution. Rothauser performs in his film in the role of Bartolomeo Vanzetti.

== Background ==
David Rothauser had been interested in the events surrounding the trial of Sacco and Vanzetti since having written of them for his graduate thesis at Boston University in 1973. The concept was first developed as a full-length screenplay that included over 50 characters, but over the 30-year period of its development, Rothauser narrowed the focus to concentrate on Bartolomeo Vanzetti as the film's central figure, and to point out the flaws in the trial which led to then-Governor of Massachusetts Michael Dukakis’ official declaration in August of 1977, that "Sacco and Vanzetti had been treated unjustly and any disgrace should be forever removed from their names."

== Synopsis ==
The film uses archived letters, speeches and documents to cover Bartolomeo Vanzetti's arrival to the United States as an immigrant, his involvement with Nicola Sacco, and the events of his trial leading up to his execution in Massachusetts in 1927.

== Release ==
The film had its theatrical premiere at the Boston Underground Film Festival in October 2003, and continues to screen in New England seven years after initial release.

== See also ==
- Sacco e Vanzetti, 1971 film
- Sacco and Vanzetti, 2006 film
