= Vanzetti =

Vanzetti is an Italian surname. Notable people with the surname include:

- Bartolomeo Vanzetti (1888–1927), Italian-born U.S. anarchist (see Sacco and Vanzetti)
- Tito Vanzetti (1809–1888), Italian surgeon

== See also ==
- Sacco and Vanzetti (disambiguation)
