= Bruno Carotenuto =

Italian actor (born 1941)

- Born: 8 May 1941 (age 84); Rome, Italy
- Occupation: Actor
- Father: Memmo Carotenuto
- Relatives: Mario Carotenuto (uncle)

Bruno Carotenuto (born 8 May 1941) is an Italian actor. He is known for playing Antonio Baxter in A Fistful of Dollars (1964), and Tom Strike in La sceriffa (1959).

== Filmography ==
- Solo Dios me detendrá (1957)
- Mattino di primavera (1957) as Alberto Morandi
- Legs of Gold (1958)
- Mujeres peligrosas (1958) as 'Tato' Bertuetti
- Gagliardi e pupe (1958) as 'Impiccetta'
- The Law (1959) as Balbo
- Violent Summer (1959) as Giulio
- Il principe fusto (1960)
- The Sheriff (1960) as Tom Strike
- Gioventù di notte (1961) as Gianfranco
- Madame (1961) as Blanchet - un garde
- Desert War (1962) as Cunego
- Ali Baba and the Seven Saracens (1964) as Saracen Leader
- A Fistful of Dollars (1964) as Antonio Baxter
- Sangre en la pradera (1964) as Lopez
- Torneo a muerte (1964) as Saracen Leader
- Napoleone a Firenze (1964)
- Seven Dollars to Kill (1966) as Rosario
