= Bruno Battisti D'Amario =

Italian classical guitarist and composer (1937–2026)

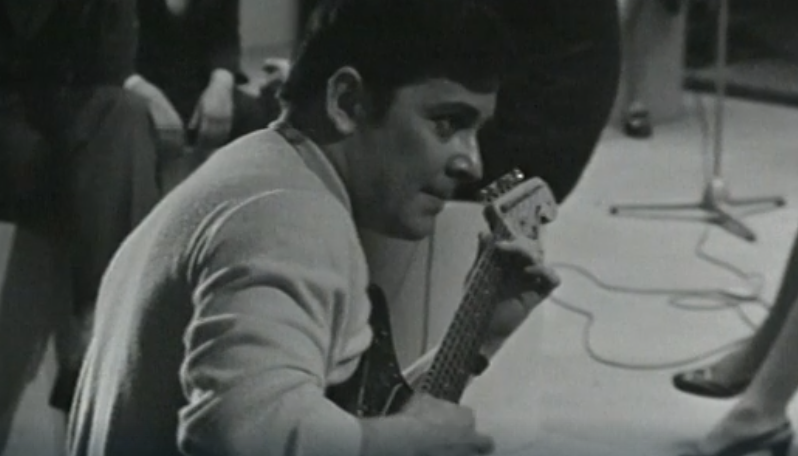
Bruno Battisti D'Amario in 1969

Bruno Battisti D'Amario (5 October 1937 – 5 August 2026) was an Italian classical guitarist, teacher and composer.

D'Amario is known for his performances on film scores by Ennio Morricone and Nino Rota, and became Professor of Classical Guitar at the Santa Cecilia Conservatory in Rome. Morricone commented that D'Amario is "able to conjure up extraordinary sounds with his guitar" for his appearances on the soundtrack to the film The Good, The Bad and the Ugly. He was a member of the Gruppo di Improvvisazione Nuova Consonanza.

In 2011 he published a composition inspired by the Tarot cards.

D'Amario died on 5 August 2026, at the age of 88.
