= William R. Thompkins =

American actor and stuntman

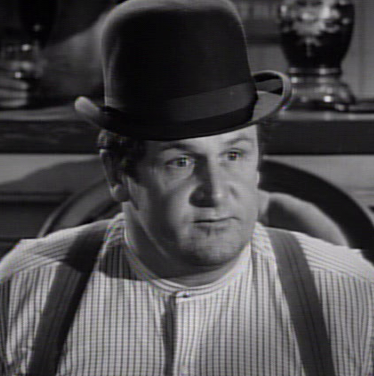
- William R. Thompkins in Rawhide (1960-1964)
- Born: April 21, 1925; Tacoma, Washington, US
- Died: September 18, 1971 (aged 46); Coupeville, Washington, US
- Occupation(s): Actor and stuntman

William R. Thompkins (April 21, 1925 – September 18, 1971) was an American actor and stuntman known for playing Toothless in the TV series Rawhide between 1960 and 1964, and Baxter Gang Member in A Fistful of Dollars (1964). He was killed on September 18, 1971, in a road accident.

== Filmography ==
Year	Title	Role	Notes
1964	A Fistful of Dollars	Baxter Gang Member	

== Television ==
Year	Title	Role	Notes
1959-1960	Rawhide	Drover	S2:11 Episodes
1960	Rawhide	Dinger	S2:E21, "Incident at Sulphur Creek"
1960	Rawhide	Achilles	S2:E24, "Incident of the Dancing Death"
1960-1961	Rawhide	Drover	S3:15 Episodes
1961	Rawhide	Thomkins	S3:E12, "Incident at the Top of the World"
1961	Rawhide	Toothless	S3:E17, "Incident of the New Start"
1961	Rawhide	Corporal	S3:E20, "Incident of the Running Iron"
1961	Rawhide	Thomkins	S3:E23, "Incident of the Phantom Bugler"
1961-1962	Rawhide	Drover	S4:12 Episodes
1961	Rawhide	Jeffries	S4:E2, "The Sendoff"
1961	Rawhide	Sloan's Heavy	S4:E24, "The Child Woman"
1962-1963	Rawhide	Toothless	S5:26 Episodes
1963-1964	Rawhide	Toothless	S6:20 Episodes
1964	Rawhide	Toothless	S7:E1, "The Race"
