= The Story of a Soldier =

Song by Ennio Morricone

from the album The Good, the Bad and the Ugly
- Language: English
- Released: 1966
- Genre: Contemporary Classical
- Label: EMI America; Capitol Records
- Composer: Ennio Morricone
- Lyricist: Tommie Connor

"The Story of a Soldier" ("La storia di un soldato" in Italian) is a song from Sergio Leone's 1966 Western The Good, the Bad and the Ugly. Like the rest of the film's score, it was composed by Ennio Morricone, and it is the only song in the score accompanied by lyrics written by Tommie Connor. The song is played by a band of Confederate prisoners of war while the character Tuco is tortured for information. It is an example of Diegetic music.

== Differing versions ==
The song is available in two versions. The original soundtrack featured a running time of 3 minutes 50 seconds which was edited down from a length of 7-and-a-half minutes. This take was featured in its entirety in the Italian premiere cut of the film, but as the production was prepared for general release the scene in question was shortened by two minutes. The re-edited scene called for a different arrangement for the song. It is this version which is presented on the expanded soundtrack released in 2001. Its running time is 5 minutes 33 seconds.
