= Sacco and Vanzetti (2006 film) =

- Directed by: Peter Miller
- Produced by: Amy Carey Linton; Jesse Crawford; Peter Miller; Nicole Opper; Tom Roche
- Starring: Henry Fonda; Arlo Guthrie; David Kaiser; Giuliano Montaldo; Nunzio Pernicone; Tony Shalhoub; Studs Terkel; Mary Anne Trasciatti; John Turturro; Howard Zinn
- Cinematography: Stephen McCarthy
- Edited by: Amy Carey Linton
- Music by: John T. LaBarbera
- Production company: Willow Pond Films
- Distributed by: First Run Features
- Release date: April 6, 2006 (Full Frame Documentary Film Festival)
- Running time: 80 minutes
- Country: United States
- Language: English

Sacco and Vanzetti is a 2006 documentary film directed by Peter Miller. Produced by Peter Miller and Editor Amy Linton, the film presents interviews with researchers and historians of the lives of Nicola Sacco and Bartolomeo Vanzetti, and their trial. It also presents forensic evidence that refutes that used by the prosecution during the trial. Prison letters written by the defendants are read by voice actors with Tony Shalhoub as Sacco and John Turturro as Vanzetti. Interviewees include Howard Zinn, Studs Terkel and Arlo Guthrie.

Sacco and Vanzetti won the 2007 John E. O'Connor Film Award, the American Historical Association's annual prize for the best historical film. It was released nationally in theaters in March 2007 and later on DVD.

== Reception ==
On review aggregator website Rotten Tomatoes, the film holds an approval rating of 86% based on 29 reviews, with an average rating of 7.5/10.

== See also ==
- Sacco e Vanzetti, a 1971 Italian film portrayal of the affair
- The Diary of Sacco and Vanzetti, a 2004 docudrama
