= Giorgio Papi =

Italian film producer

- Born: 1917
- Died: 2002 (aged 84–85); Rome, Italy
- Occupation(s): Film producer and production manager
- Children: Maria Ludovica Papi
- Relatives: Pier Giorgio Palladino

Giorgio Papi (1917–2002) was an Italian film producer and production manager.

He met Orson Welles in the set of Black Magic (1949), where he was the head of production, and they worked in Othello (1951).

He produced along Arrigo Colombo A Fistful of Dollars (1964). Both hired Sergio Leone to direct the film with a budget of 200.000 dollars. In 1964 they founded Jolly Film, and they produced Gunfight at Red Sands (1963), and Grand Slam (1967), between others.

He was member of the jury at the Cannes Film Festival in 1972.

== Filmography ==
- Sacco & Vanzetti (1971)
- Violent City (1970)
- Grand Slam (1967)
- A Fistful of Dollars (1964)
- Inspector Maigret (1958)
- The Intruder (1956)
- Othello (1951)
- Cagliostro (1949)
- Te amaré siempre (1943)
- Four Steps in the Clouds (1942)
- Before the Postman (1942)
