= Arrigo Colombo =

Italian film producer

- Born: 1916; Italy
- Died: 1998 (aged 81–82)
- Occupation: Film producer

Arrigo Colombo (1916–1998) was an Italian film producer.

He founded Jolly Film with Giorgio Papi, which produced Gunfight at Red Sands (1963).

Arrigo Colombo and Giorgio Papi hired Sergio Leone to direct A Fistful of Dollars (1964) with a budget of 200.000 dollars. He was the only one who accepted the project by Giuliano Montaldo Sacco & Vanzetti (1971).

== Filmography ==
=== As producer ===
- La viuda indomable (1978)
- Seven Beauties (1975)
- The Master and Margaret (1972)
- Sacco & Vanzetti (1971)
- Violent City (1970)
- Grand Slam (1967)
- A Fistful of Dollars (1964)
- I motorizzati (1962)
- Inspector Maigret (1958)
- The Intruder (1956)
- On Trial (1954)
- I'm the Capataz (1951)

=== As writer ===
- More Dollars for the MacGregors (1970)
- Requiem for a Gringo (1968)
- La duchessa di Santa Lucia (1959)
- Under the Southern Cross (1938)

=== As director ===
- Black Magic (1949)
