= Sacco and Vanzetti (play) =

1960 play by Mino Roli and Luciano Vincenzoni

- Written by: Mino Roli and Luciano Vincenzoni
- Original language: Italian

Premiere
- Date premiered: December 27, 1960
- Place premiered: Parioli di Roma

Sacco and Vanzetti (Italian: Sacco e Vanzetti) is a 1960 play by Mino Roli and Luciano Vincenzoni about the Sacco and Vanzetti case.

== Development ==
Mino Roli and Luciano Vincenzoni wrote the chronicle play in 1960. Following its successful Italian production in Rome's Paroli Theater, the play traveled to Germany, France, Great Britain, and Latin America. A musical version of the play, The Shoemaker and the Peddler, played off-Broadway in New York.

Following its French translation by César Gattegno and Eli Marinelli, Raymond Gerbal staged the production with the Franc Théâtre in Paris's Théâtre Récamier in April 1964. Later productions moved to the suburbs.

== Bibliography ==
- Lo spettacolo, enciclopedia Garzanti, 1976, p. 647
- La Stampa, 1961-09-17
- Corriere della sera, 1961-06-29
- La Stampa, 1960-12-12
- "Sacco e Vanzetti". Teatro Nuovo. 1 (3): 19–40. 1961. OCLC 20408622.
