= Luciano Vincenzoni =

Italian screenwriter (1926–2013)

- Born: 7 March 1926; Treviso, Veneto, Kingdom of Italy
- Died: 22 September 2013 (aged 87); Rome, Italy
- Occupation: Screenwriter

Luciano Vincenzoni (Italian pronunciation: [luˈtʃaːno vintʃenˈtsoːni]; 7 March 1926 – 22 September 2013) was an Italian screenwriter, known as the "script doctor". He wrote for some 65 films between 1954 and 2000.

== Biography ==
Vincenzoni was born in Treviso, Veneto. He is probably best known in world cinema for his scriptwriting of Sergio Leone's For a Few Dollars More (1965) and The Good, the Bad and the Ugly in 1966, but he also wrote for a number of other Spaghetti Westerns.

== Filmography ==
His screenwriting credits also include:

- The Wanderers (1956)
- The Italians They Are Crazy (1958)
- Revolt of the Mercenaries (1961)
- La vita agra (1964)
- Seduced and Abandoned (1964)
- The Birds, the Bees and the Italians (1966)
- Death Rides a Horse (1967)
- The Mercenary (1968)
- Duck, You Sucker!, a.k.a. A Fistful of Dynamite (1971)
- Orca (1977)
- Raw Deal (1986)
- Once Upon a Crime (1992)
- Malèna (2000)

== See also ==
- Sergio Leone
- Sacco e Vanzetti (play)
