= Shutter Island (film) =

2010 American film by Martin Scorsese

- Theatrical release poster
- Directed by: Martin Scorsese
- Screenplay by: Laeta Kalogridis
- Based on: Shutter Island by Dennis Lehane
- Produced by: Mike Medavoy; Arnold W. Messer; Bradley J. Fischer; Martin Scorsese
- Starring: Leonardo DiCaprio; Mark Ruffalo; Ben Kingsley; Michelle Williams; Emily Mortimer; Patricia Clarkson; Max von Sydow
- Cinematography: Robert Richardson
- Edited by: Thelma Schoonmaker
- Production companies: Phoenix Pictures; Sikelia Productions; Appian Way Productions
- Distributed by: Paramount Pictures
- Release dates: February 13, 2010 (Berlinale); February 19, 2010 (United States)
- Running time: 138 minutes
- Country: United States
- Language: English
- Budget: $80 million
- Box office: $294.8 million

Shutter Island is a 2010 American neo-noir psychological thriller film directed by Martin Scorsese. The screenplay was adapted by Laeta Kalogridis from the 2003 novel by Dennis Lehane. It follows Deputy U.S. Marshal Edward "Teddy" Daniels and his partner Chuck, who come to the fictional Shutter Island in Boston Harbor to investigate its criminal psychiatric facility after one of its patients goes missing; Daniels has his own ulterior motives for taking the case. The film stars Leonardo DiCaprio and Mark Ruffalo, with Ben Kingsley, Max von Sydow and Michelle Williams in supporting roles.

Development began when Phoenix Pictures acquired the film rights to the novel directly from Lehane after Columbia Pictures had allowed their rights to lapse in 2003. Phoenix hired Laeta Kalogridis to work on a screenplay for a year, and in 2007, announced that both Scorsese and DiCaprio had joined the project. Production began on March 6, 2008, at various locations in Massachusetts; filming ended on July 2, 2008.

Partnering with Paramount Pictures, the film's wide release was on February 19, 2010, and received generally positive reviews from critics. It was ranked by the National Board of Review in their top ten films of 2010, and grossed $295 million worldwide. The film is also noted for its soundtrack, which prominently featured classical music by composers such as Gustav Mahler, Krzysztof Penderecki, György Ligeti, John Cage, Ingram Marshall and Max Richter. In 2025, the film was voted for the "Readers' Choice" edition of The New York Times' list of "The 100 Best Movies of the 21st Century", finishing at number 169.

== Plot ==
In 1954, U.S. Marshal Edward "Teddy" Daniels and his new partner Chuck Aule travel to Ashecliffe Hospital for the criminally insane on Shutter Island in Boston Harbor. They are investigating the disappearance of Rachel Solando, a patient of the hospital who had killed her three children by drowning.

The staff, led by psychiatrist John Cawley and his colleague Jerimiah Naehring, appear uncooperative. The marshals learn that Lester Sheehan, the doctor who was treating Solando, left the island on vacation immediately after Solando disappeared. Teddy experiences migraines and flashbacks of his time as a U.S. soldier in the liberation of Dachau, as well as vivid dreams of his wife Dolores, who was killed in a fire in their building set by pyromaniac Andrew Laeddis. Teddy tells Chuck he took this case to find Laeddis, who he believes is a patient. Solando suddenly resurfaces, but believes Teddy is her husband.

Teddy breaks into the restricted Ward C to find Laeddis, but meets patient George Noyce, who acts as if he knows Teddy. Noyce says the doctors experiment on patients and lobotomize them in the lighthouse. He warns Teddy that everyone will deceive him and not to trust his partner Chuck.

Teddy and Chuck climb the cliffs toward the lighthouse but are separated. Believing he saw Chuck's body on the rocks below, Teddy climbs down but finds a cave where a woman claiming to be the real Rachel Solando is hiding. She reveals she is a former psychiatrist who discovered clandestine experiments on mind control at the facility, and was forcibly committed to silence her. She warns that Cawley and Naehring will use Teddy's war trauma to feign a psychotic break, so they can have him committed. Teddy returns to the hospital. When he asks about Chuck, Cawley insists that Teddy arrived at Shutter Island alone.

Convinced that Chuck has been taken to the lighthouse, Teddy is intercepted by Naehring, who attempts to sedate him. Teddy overpowers him and breaks into the lighthouse to find Cawley waiting for him. Cawley tells him that Rachel Solando never existed and that Teddy has not been drugged but is experiencing withdrawal from chlorpromazine, a neuroleptic medication he has taken for the past two years.

Chuck arrives and reveals that he is Sheehan. Cawley reveals that "Teddy" is really Andrew Laeddis, a former U.S. Marshal incarcerated at Ashecliffe for killing his manic depressive wife Dolores Chanal after she drowned their three children. Andrew failed to seek treatment for Dolores when she burned down their apartment. He instead moved his family to a lakehouse where Dolores carried out the killings. As a result of his guilt, Andrew became delusional and created the alternate persona of Edward Daniels. (Note: "Edward Daniels" is an anagram of Andrew Laeddis, and "Rachel Solando" is an anagram of his dead wife's name, Dolores Chanal.) The "investigation" of Rachel Solando was an elaborate roleplay, supported by hospital staff, to help Andrew play out his delusion so he might break out of it and return to reality. Overwhelmed, Andrew faints.

Awakening, Andrew recounts the truth, satisfying the doctors that he is lucid. Cawley notes they had achieved this state nine months ago but had quickly regressed. He warns that this will be Andrew's last chance, and if he lapses again, he will be lobotomized due to his violent conduct toward the guards and other patients, such as Noyce.

Some time later, Andrew relaxes on the hospital grounds with Sheehan. Appearing delusional, he calls Sheehan "Chuck", and says they must leave the island. Sheehan signals to a watching Cawley, who orders the lobotomy. Andrew asks Sheehan if it would be worse "to live as a monster or to die as a good man". A stunned Sheehan calls Andrew "Teddy", but the latter does not respond and leaves peacefully with the orderlies for his operation.

== Cast ==
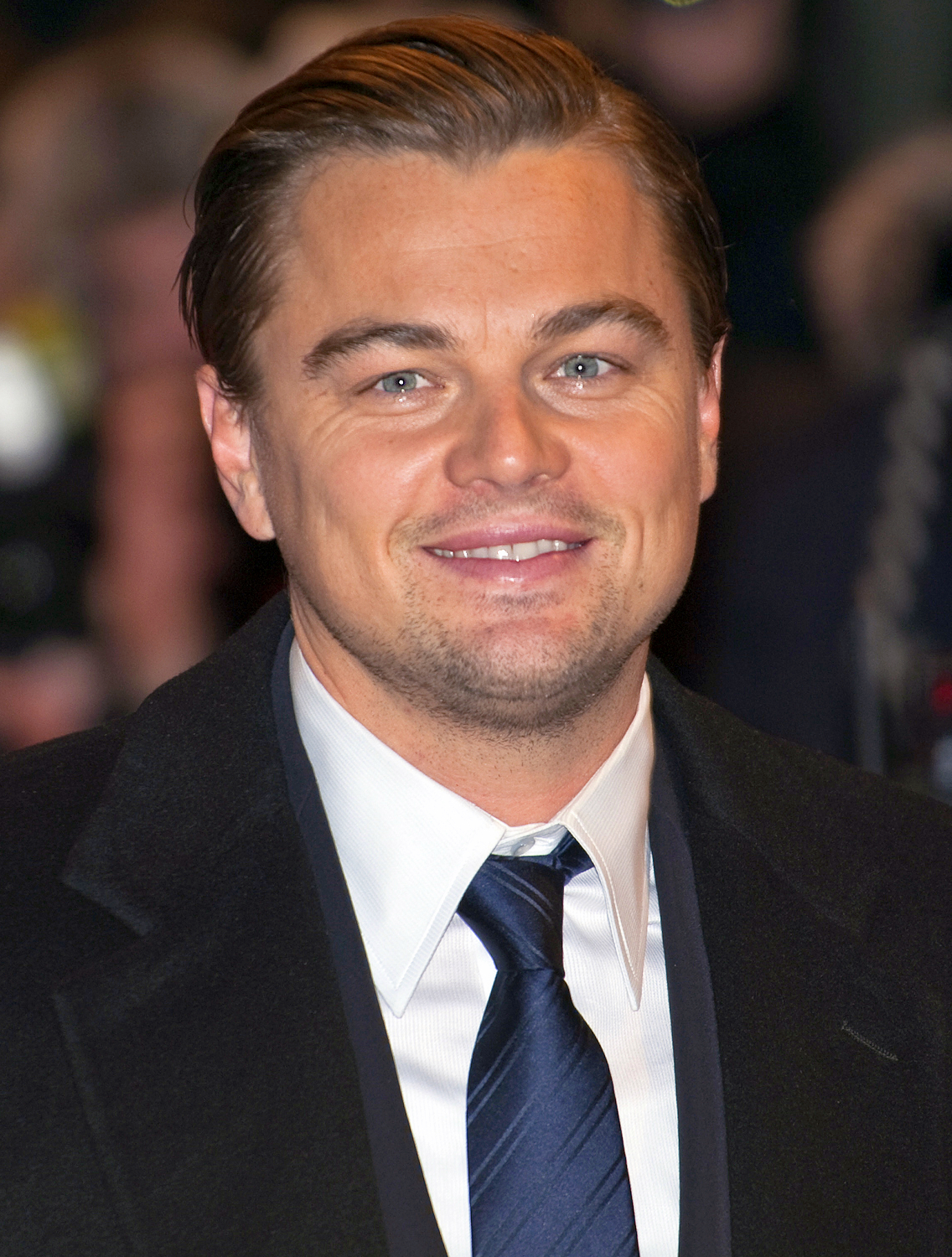
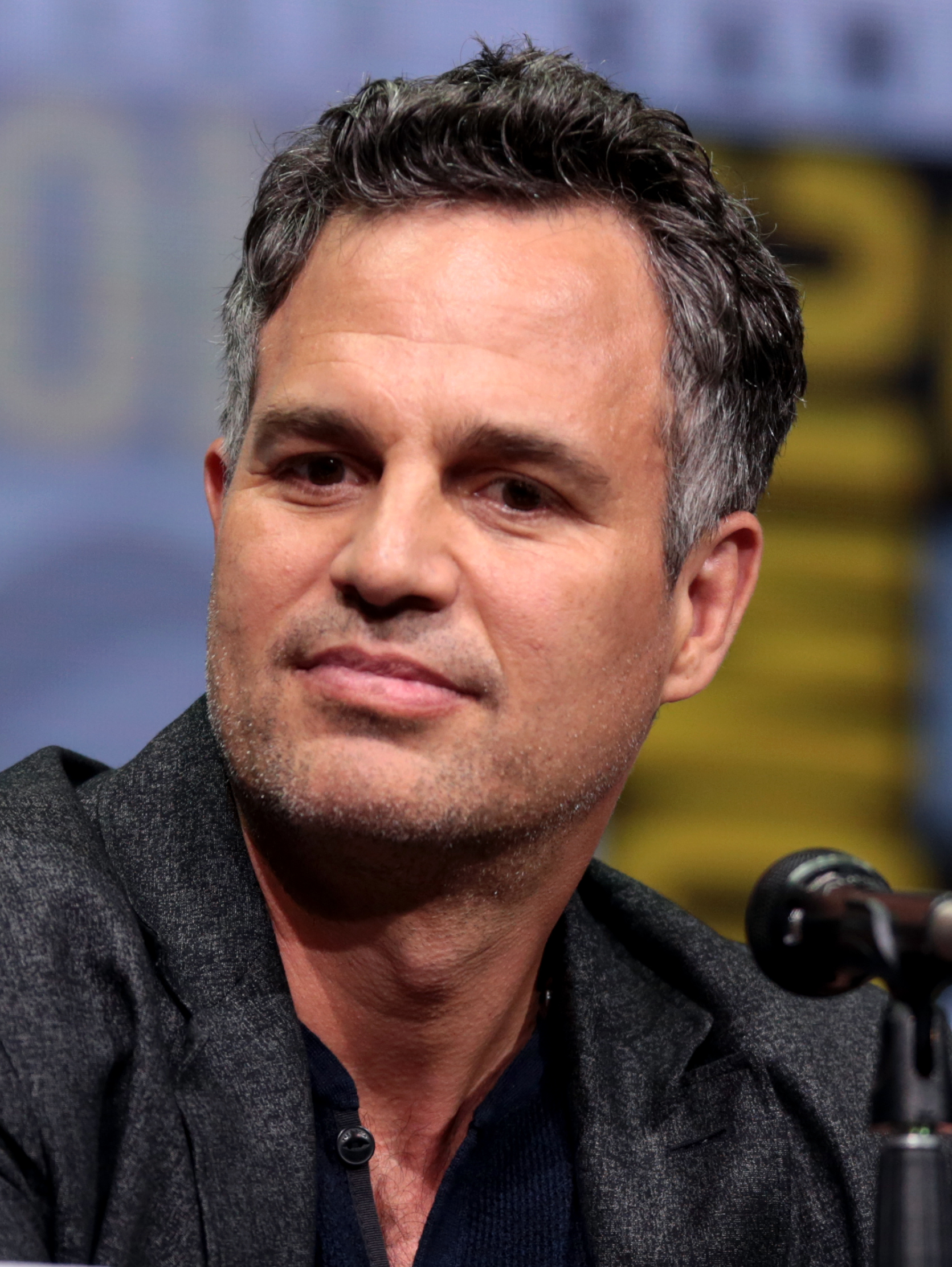
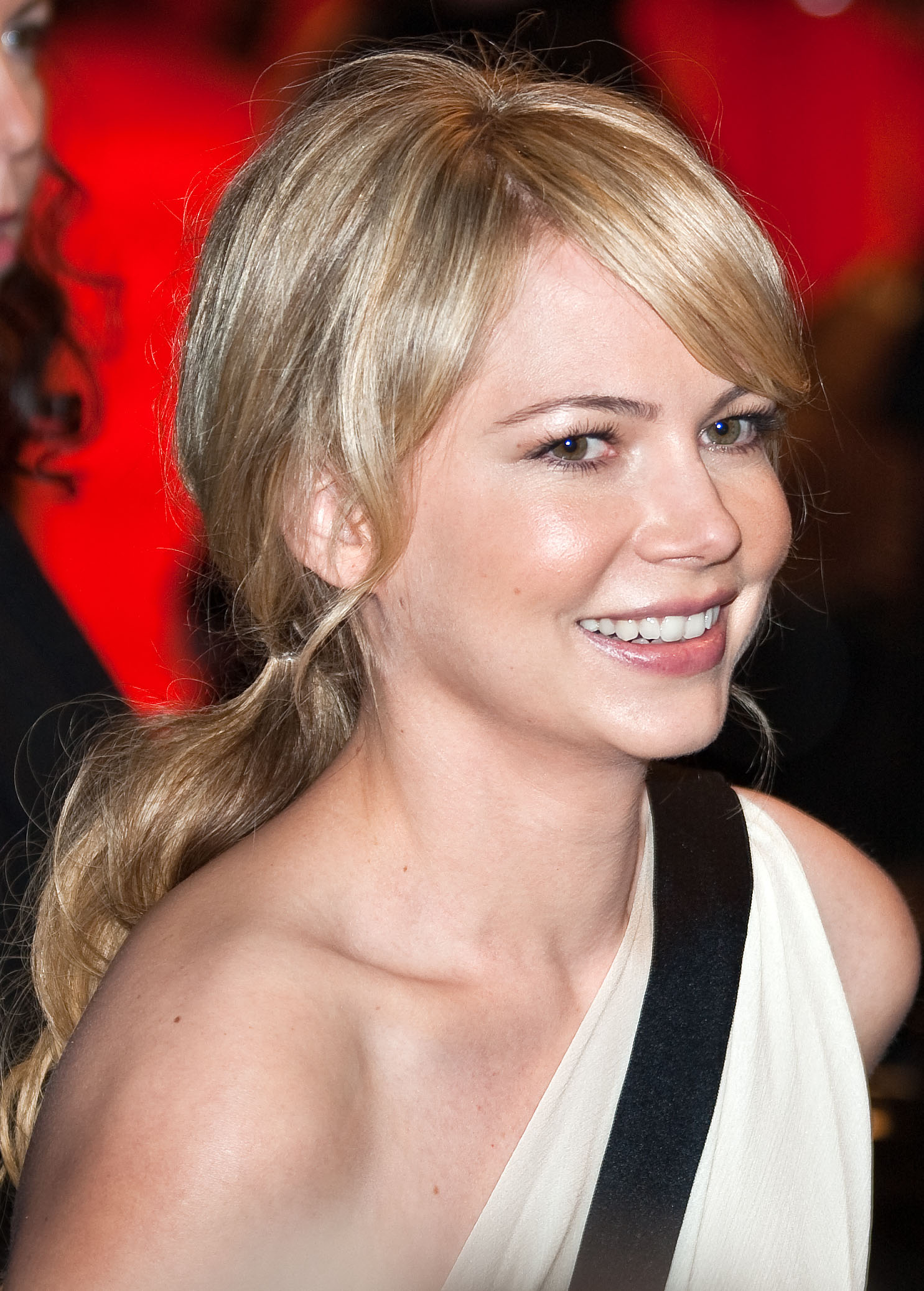
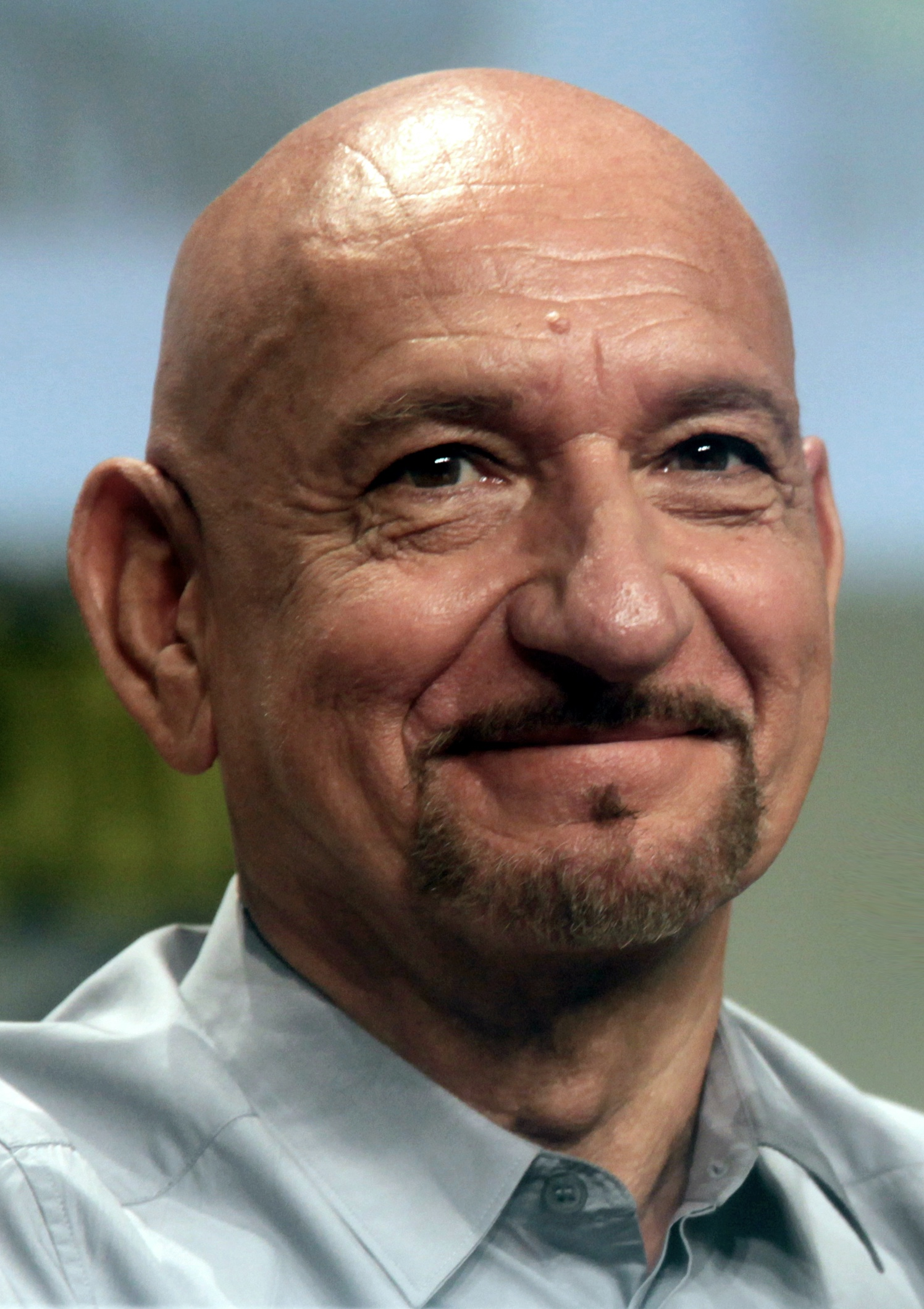
(Clockwise) Shutter Island stars Leonardo DiCaprio, Mark Ruffalo, Ben Kingsley, and Michelle Williams
- Leonardo DiCaprio as Edward "Teddy" Daniels / Andrew Laeddis, a former U.S. Marshal who investigates the Shutter Island insane asylum
- Mark Ruffalo as Chuck Aule / Dr. Lester Sheehan, Teddy's primary psychiatrist doubling as his Marshal partner
- Ben Kingsley as Dr. John Cawley, a senior psychiatrist at Shutter Island
- Max von Sydow as Dr. Naehring, a colleague of Cawley
- Michelle Williams as Dolores Chanal, Teddy's manic-depressive wife
- Emily Mortimer and Patricia Clarkson as Rachel Solando:
  - Mortimer portrays the version presented by Cawley as the one who escaped Shutter Island, later revealed to be a nurse in disguise
  - Clarkson portrays the version met by Teddy in a cave who affirms his conspiracies, later revealed to be a hallucination
- Jackie Earle Haley as George Noyce, a patient in Ward C
- Ted Levine as Warden
- John Carroll Lynch as Deputy Warden McPherson
- Joseph Sikora as Glen Miga
- Elias Koteas as Laeddis
- Robin Bartlett as Bridget Kearns
- Christopher Denham as Peter Breene
- Curtiss Cook as Trey Washington

== Production ==
=== Development ===
The rights to Dennis Lehane's novel Shutter Island were first optioned to Columbia Pictures in 2003. Columbia did not act on the option, and it lapsed back to Lehane, who sold it to Phoenix Pictures. Phoenix hired Laeta Kalogridis, and together, they developed the film for a year. Director Martin Scorsese and actor Leonardo DiCaprio were both attracted to the project. Production began on March 6, 2008.

Lehane's inspiration for the hospital and island setting was Long Island in Boston Harbor, which he had visited as a child with his uncle and family during the blizzard of 1978.

=== Filming ===
Shutter Island was mainly filmed in Massachusetts, with Taunton being the location for the World War II flashback scenes. Old industrial buildings in Taunton's Whittenton Mills Complex replicated the Dachau concentration camp. The old Medfield State Hospital in Medfield, Massachusetts, was another key location.

Cawley's office scenes were the second floor of the chapel during the late evening. Lights were shone through the windows to make it appear to be daytime. The crew painted the hospital's brick walls to look like plywood. This served the dual purpose of acting as scenery and blocking the set from view of a local road.

The crew wanted to film at the old Worcester State Hospital, but demolition of surrounding buildings made it impossible. The stone lodge next to Leach Pond at Borderland State Park in Easton, Massachusetts, was used for the cabin scene. The film used Peddocks Island as a setting for the story's island. East Point, in Nahant, Massachusetts, was the location for the lighthouse scenes. The scenes in which Teddy and Chuck are caught in the hurricane were filmed at the Wilson Mountain Reservation in Dedham, Massachusetts. Filming ended on July 2, 2008.

== Music ==
Shutter Island: Music from the Motion Picture

Soundtrack album by various artists
- Released: February 2, 2010
- Genre: Film soundtrack
- Length: 116:41
- Label: Rhino Records
- Producers: Robbie Robertson; John Powell

The film does not have an original score. Instead, Scorsese's longtime collaborator Robbie Robertson created an ensemble of previously recorded material to use in the film. Shutter Island: Music from the Motion Picture was released on February 2, 2010, by Rhino Records.

According to a statement on Paramount's website: "The collection of modern classical music [on the soundtrack album] was hand-selected by Robertson, who is proud of its scope and sound. 'This may be the most outrageous and beautiful soundtrack I've ever heard.' [Robertson stated]."

Los Angeles Times' classical music reviewer Mark Swed noted that "Robertson went through a lot of trouble to make things work as well". He argues that while other reviewers have called the music "melodramatic", "nothing could be further from the truth".

Another reviewer noted that "Scorsese has abandoned his oft-used classic rock soundtrack habits and, almost positively taking a queue from Stanley Kubrick's soundtracks, adopted a selection mostly of various modern classical pieces", and that "this set of pieces certainly suggests a different mood rather than a conventional score".

Pop culture critic Noel Murray lists the album at #24 in Vulture's 2018 "40 Greatest Movie Soundtracks of All Time", saying, "Besides drawing attention to the modern geniuses of a wholly different genre, the unfamiliar, almost alien sounds of the Shutter Island soundtrack reinforce the movie's tale of hallucinatory madness".

A full track listing of the album is below. All the musical works are featured in the final film.

Disc 1

1. "Fog Tropes" (Ingram Marshall) – Orchestra of St. Lukes & John Adams
2. "Symphony No. 3: Passacaglia – Allegro Moderato" (Krzysztof Penderecki) – National Polish Radio Symphony & Antoni Wit
3. "Music for Marcel Duchamp" (John Cage) – Philipp Vandré
4. "Hommage à John Cage" – Nam June Paik
5. "Lontano" (György Ligeti) – Wiener Philharmoniker & Claudio Abbado
6. "Rothko Chapel 2" (Morton Feldman) – UC Berkeley Chamber Chorus
7. "Cry" – Johnnie Ray
8. "On the Nature of Daylight" – Max Richter
9. "Uaxuctum: The Legend of the Mayan City Which They Themselves Destroyed for Religious Reasons – 3rd Movement" (Giacinto Scelsi) – Vienna Radio Symphony Orchestra
10. "Quartet for Strings and Piano in A Minor" (Gustav Mahler) – Prazak Quartet

Disc 2

1. "Christian Zeal and Activity" (John Adams) – The San Francisco Symphony & Edo de Waart
2. "Suite for Symphonic Strings: Nocturne" (Lou Harrison) – The New Professionals Orchestra & Rebecca Miller
3. "Lizard Point" – Brian Eno
4. "Four Hymns: II for Cello and Double Bass" (Alfred Schnittke) – Torleif Thedéen & Entcho Radoukanov
5. "Root of an Unfocus" (John Cage) – Boris Berman
6. "Prelude – The Bay" – Ingram Marshall
7. "Wheel of Fortune" – Kay Starr
8. "Tomorrow Night" – Lonnie Johnson
9. "This Bitter Earth"/"On the Nature of Daylight" – Dinah Washington & Max Richter; arrangement by Robbie Robertson

== Genre ==
Shutter Island is a period piece with nods to different films in the film noir and horror genres, paying particular homage to Alfred Hitchcock's works. Scorsese stated in an interview that the main reference to Teddy Daniels was Dana Andrews's character in Laura, and he was also influenced by several very low-budget 1940s zombie movies by Val Lewton.

The main plot resembles William Peter Blatty's The Ninth Configuration, as well as The Cabinet of Dr. Caligari. La Croix noted Shutter Island was a "complex and puzzling" work that borrowed from genres as diverse as detective, fantasy, and the psychological thriller.

There have been differing opinions of the film's ending, in which Laeddis asks Dr. Sheehan "which would be worse—to live as a monster, or to die as a good man?", a line that does not appear in the book. Professor James Gilligan of New York University was Scorsese's psychiatric adviser, and he said that Laeddis's last words mean: "I feel too guilty to go on living. I'm not going to actually commit suicide, but I'm going to vicariously commit suicide by handing myself over to these people who're going to lobotomize me." Dennis Lehane, however, said, "Personally, I think he has a momentary flash.... It's just one moment of sanity mixed in the midst of all the other delusions."

== Release ==
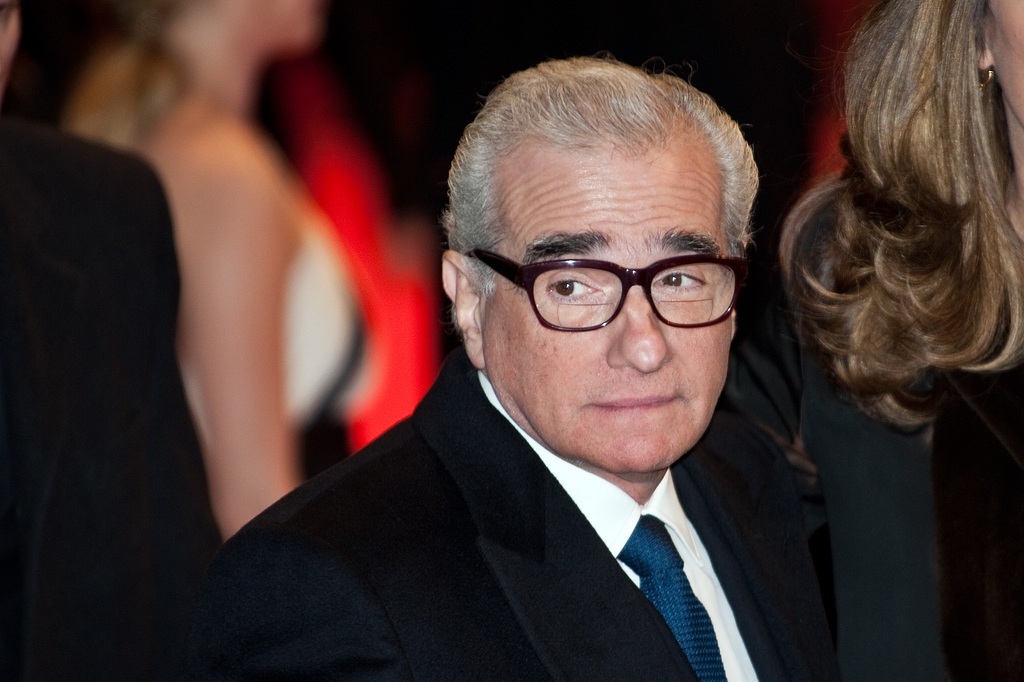
Director Martin Scorsese at the film's premiere at the 60th Berlin International Film Festival

The film was originally scheduled to be released by Paramount Pictures in the United States and Canada on October 2, 2009. Paramount announced it was pushing back the release date to February 19, 2010. Reports attribute the pushback to Paramount not having "the financing in 2009 to spend the $50 to $60 million necessary to market a big awards pic like this", to DiCaprio's unavailability to promote the film internationally, and to Paramount's hope the economy might rebound enough by February 2010 that a film geared toward adult audiences would be more viable financially.

The film premiered at the 60th Berlin International Film Festival as part of the competition screening on February 13, 2010. Paramount released the film worldwide, with the exception of Germany, Austria, Italy, Spain, the CIS and the Baltics. Paramount Vantage International distributed the film in some countries, such as selling it to Concorde Filmverleih for Germany and Austria, Medusa Distribuzione for Italy, Vertice Cine for Spain, Cascade Film for Russia and Ukraine, and ACME Film for the Baltics.

== Reception ==
=== Critical response ===
Rotten Tomatoes gives the film an approval rating of 69% based on 263 reviews, with an average rating of 6.7/10. The site's critical consensus reads: "It may not rank with Scorsese's best work, but Shutter Island's gleefully unapologetic genre thrills represent the director at his most unrestrained." On Metacritic, the film received a weighted average score of 63 out of 100, based on 37 critics, indicating "generally favorable" reviews. Audiences surveyed by CinemaScore gave the film an average "C+" grade on a scale of A+ to F.

Lawrence Toppman of The Charlotte Observer gave the film four stars out of four, claiming, "After four decades, Martin Scorsese has earned the right to deliver a simple treatment of a simple theme with flair".

Writing for The Wall Street Journal, John Anderson highly praised the film, suggesting it "requires multiple viewings to be fully realized as a work of art. Its process is more important than its story, its structure more important than the almost perfunctory plot twists it perpetrates. It's a thriller, a crime story and a tortured psychological parable about collective guilt."

Awarding the film three-and-a-half stars out of four, Roger Ebert of the Chicago Sun-Times wrote, "The movie is about: atmosphere, ominous portents, the erosion of Teddy's confidence and even his identity. It's all done with flawless directorial command. Scorsese has fear to evoke, and he does it with many notes."

The Orlando Sentinel's Roger Moore, who gave the film two-and-a-half stars out of four, wrote, "It's not bad, but as Scorsese, America's greatest living filmmaker and film history buff should know, even Hitchcock came up short on occasion. See for yourself."

Dana Stevens of Slate described the film "an aesthetically and at times intellectually exciting puzzle, but it's never emotionally involving".

The Washington Post film critic Ann Hornaday negatively described the film as being "weird".

A. O. Scott of The New York Times wrote, "Something TERRIBLE is afoot. Sadly, that something turns out to be the movie itself." In 2025, it was on the "Readers' Choice" edition of The New York Times' list of "The 100 Best Movies of the 21st Century", finishing at number 169.

Keith Uhlich of Time Out (New York) named Shutter Island the fifth-best film of 2010.

=== Box office ===
Shutter Island earned $41 million in its first weekend, finished first at the box office and gave Scorsese his highest-grossing box office opening to date. The film remained at #1 in its second weekend, with $22.2 million. Eventually, it grossed worldwide $294,805,697 and became Scorsese's second highest-grossing film worldwide. It is Scorsese's fifth movie to debut at the box office at #1, following Taxi Driver, Goodfellas, Cape Fear and The Departed.

=== Home media ===
Shutter Island was released by Paramount Home Entertainment on DVD and Blu-ray on June 8, 2010, in the US, and on August 2, 2010, in the UK. The UK release features two editions: a standard edition and a limited steel-case edition. For the tenth anniversary of the film's release, Paramount Pictures released a 4K steelbook and Blu-ray version on February 11, 2020.

== Other media ==
A Shutter Island video game was released for PC in 2010. A Nintendo DS version was canceled. In August 2014, Paramount Television and HBO were reported to be developing a prequel TV series, Ashecliffe.
