= Canticum Canticorum Salomonis =

1973 choral composition by Krzysztof Penderecki

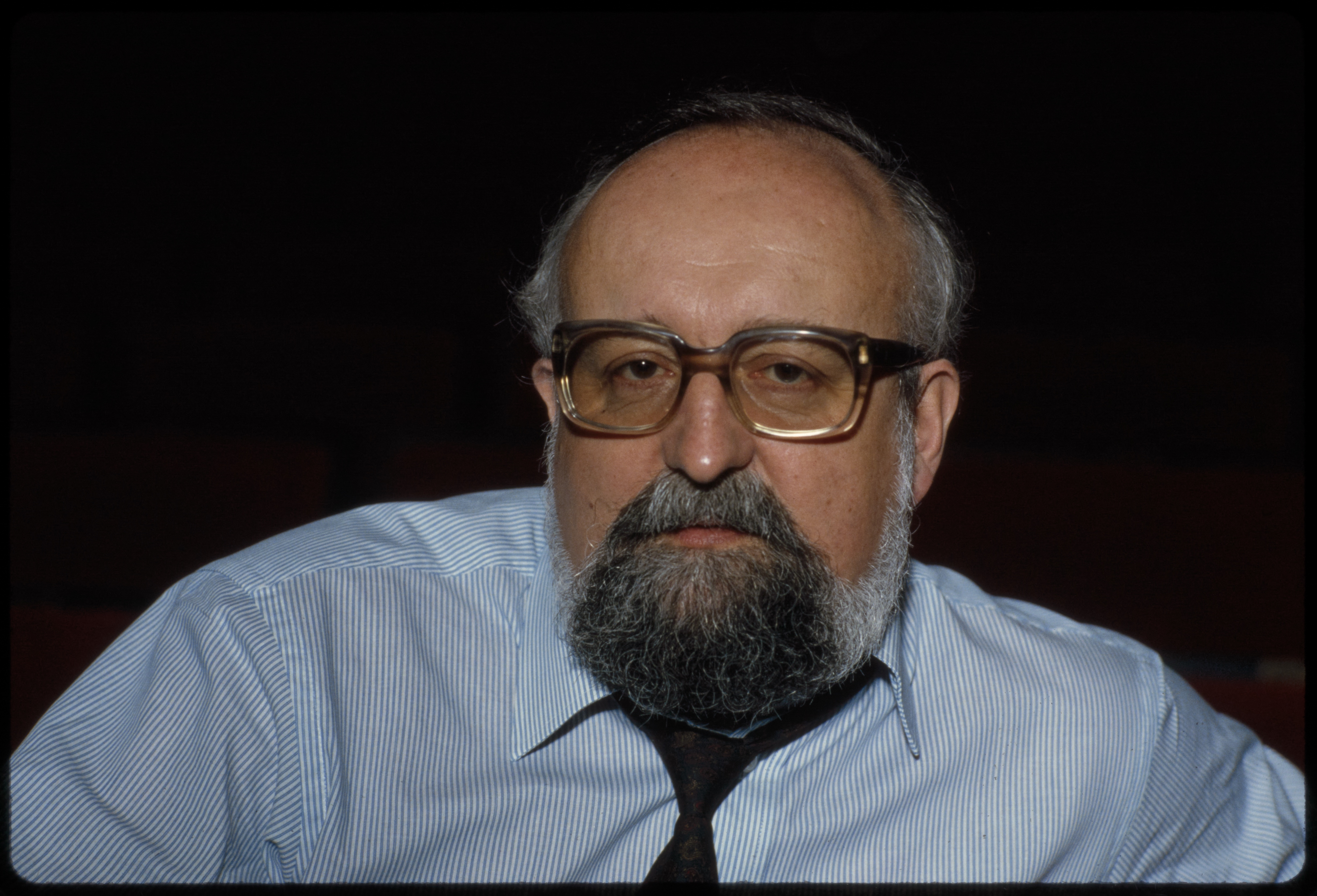
Krzysztof Penderecki in the 1980s

Canticum Canticorum Salomonis is a choral composition by Polish composer Krzysztof Penderecki. It was finished in 1973. The composition, which is in one movement, takes approximately 16 minutes to perform, and uses an erotic text which is extracted from the Song of Songs. It is scored for a 16-voice choir and orchestra.

== Composition ==
The composition was commissioned by the Gulbenkian Foundation and took Penderecki from 1970 to 1973 to finish it. It was premiered in Lisbon on June 5, 1973. Werner Andreas Albert conducted the Gulbenkian Orchestra and Les Percussions de Strasbourg, together with the NCRV Vocal Ensemble, which considered the composition too difficult to be performed. It is dedicated to Emil Breisach and was published by the Polish Music Publishing House and Schott Music.

== Text ==
Following is the complete text used in the composition:

(Sponsa, Song of Solomon 1:1-2,12)
Osculetur me osculo oris sui
Quia meliora sunt ubera tua vino
Fragrantia unguentis optimis
Fasciculus murrae dilectus meus mihi
Inter ubera mea commorabitur

(Sponsus, Song of Solomon 1:14)
Ecce tu pulchra es amica mea ecce tu pulchra
Oculi tui columbarum

(Sponsa, Song of Solomon 1:15, Song of Solomon 2:4-6)
Ecce tu pulcher es dilecte mi et decorus
Lectulus noster floridus
Introduxit me in cellam vinariam
Ordinavit in me caritatem
Fulcite me floribus
Stipate me malis
Quia amore langueo
Leva eius sub capite meo
Et dextera illius amplexabitur me

(Sponsus, Song of Solomon 2:7)
Adiuro vos filiae Hierusalem
Per capreas cervosque camporum
Ne suscitetis neque evigilare faciatis dilectam
Quoadusque ipsa velit

(Sponsa, Song of Solomon 2:8-9)
Ecce iste venit
Saliens in montibus transiliens colles
Similis est dilectus meus capreae
Hinuloque cervorum
En ipse stat post parietem nostrum
Despiciens per fenestras
Prospiciens per cancellos

(Sponsus, Song of Solomon 2:10-11,13–14)
Surge propera amica mea
Formonsa mea et veni
Iam enim hiemps transiit
Imber abiit et recessit
Surge amica mea speciosa mea et veni
Columba mea in foraminibus petrae in caverna maceriae
Ostende mihi faciem tua

== Reception ==
The composition received mixed opinions by critics. Opinions from Polish critics ranged from "one of the best of Penderecki's works", by Malinowski and Michałowski, and "colorful, subtle, elegant, and expressively discreet", by Zielinski, to remarks by Kaczynzki, who deplored the low dynamism of the composition and stated that the composition "deserved a warmer welcome, despite the incoherence of its texts". Polish critic Marian Fuks described the musical style of the work as "lukewarm".
