= Elżbieta Penderecka =

Polish cultural activist (1947–2025)

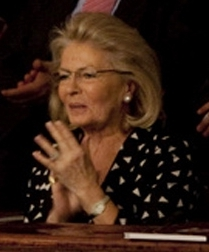
- Penderecka in 2011
- Born: Elizabeth Ludwika Solecka; 19 November 1947; Kraków
- Died: 31 October 2025 (aged 77)
- Occupation: cultural activist
- Spouse: Krzysztof Penderecki (1965–2020; his death)

Elżbieta Ludwika Penderecka (née Solecka; 19 November 1947 – 31 October 2025) was a Polish cultural activist, patron of culture, initiator and organizer of music festivals who was a member of the authorities of international music foundations.

== Biography ==
=== Family and education ===
She was born into the family of Leon Solecki, concertmaster of the Kraków Philharmonic. She passed her secondary school leaving examination at the 10th High School in Kraków. She then studied physics at the Jagiellonian University in Kraków. On 19 December 1965, she married Krzysztof Penderecki. They had two children: Łukasz (born 1966, a graduate of four fields of study, practicing as a psychiatrist) and Dominika (born 1971, a graduate of Italian philology).

=== Professional and social activities ===
From the mid-1960s, she ran Krzysztof Penderecki's secretariat. In 1990, she founded and managed the first private cultural agency, Heritage Promotion of Music and Art, until 1995. From 1992, she assisted her husband in organizing the Pablo Casals Festival in San Juan, Puerto Rico (Krzysztof Penderecki served as artistic director of this festival from 1992 to 2002). She served on the supervisory boards of several cultural organizations and co-founded the European Mozart Foundation. She contributed to the establishment of the Sinfonietta Cracovia chamber orchestra, the official orchestra of Kraków. In 1997, together with the "Studio" Art Center, she organized a charity concert for flood victims, featuring Sinfonia Varsovia, Yehudi Menuhin, the National Philharmonic Choir, and soloists (including Ewa Pobłocka. In the same year, she initiated the series "Concerts of the Great Masters – Elżbieta Penderecka Invites," presenting artists such as Mstislav Rostropovich, Jessye Norman, and Simon Estes. From 1996 to 2000, she chaired the program council of the Kraków 2000 – European City of Culture Festival, and in 1998 served as artistic director of the Krzysztof Penderecki Festival. In 1997, she organized the first Ludwig van Beethoven Easter Festival, which for the first seven years was held in Kraków, before being moved to Warsaw in 2004.

In 2003, she assumed the position of president of the Ludwig van Beethoven Association. She also became general director of the piano festival, initiated in 2004 in Warsaw and a continuation of the "Masters of the Piano – Great Talents" festival. In 2005, she initiated the formation of the Beethoven Academy Orchestra, composed of the most talented students and graduates of the Academy of Music in Kraków.

In 2005, she joined the honorary committee supporting Lech Kaczyński as a candidate for the office of President of the Republic of Poland. In 2010 and 2015, she became involved in Bronisław Komorowski's presidential campaign, joining his support committee.

She died in 2025 and is buried at the National Pantheon in Krakow.

== Awards and distinctions ==
Orders and decorations

- Krzyż Wielki Orderu Odrodzenia Polski (pośmiertnie, 2025)
- Krzyż Komandorski z Gwiazdą Orderu Odrodzenia Polski (2023)
- Krzyż Oficerski Orderu Odrodzenia Polski (2012)
- Krzyż Kawalerski Orderu Odrodzenia Polski (1996)
- Złoty Medal Zasłużony Kulturze Gloria Artis” (2023)
- Srebrny Medal Zasłużony Kulturze Gloria Artis” (2011)
- Odznaka Honorowa Bene Merito” (2010)
- Krzyż Kawalerski Orderu Bernardo O’Higginsa – Chile (2008)
- Złota Odznaka Honorowa za Zasługi dla Republiki Austrii – Austria (2003)
- Krzyż Oficerski Orderu „Za zasługi dla Litwy” – Litwa (2006)
- Krzyż Komandorski Orderu Gwiazdy Solidarności Włoskiej – Włochy (2006)
- Krzyż z Gwiazdą Orderu Pro Merito Melitensi – Zakon Maltański (2011)
- Krzyż Zasługi na Wstędze Orderu Zasługi Republiki Federalnej Niemiec – Niemcy (2012)
- Krzyż Kawalerski Orderu Białej Róży Finlandii – Finlandia (2023)
- Kawaler Orderu Zasługi Wielkiego Księstwa Luksemburga – Luksemburg (2024)

Awards and distinctions

- Tytuł honorowego obywatela Zabrza – 2022
- Paszport „Polityki” 2012 w kategorii kreator kultury (wraz z mężem Krzysztofem Pendereckim) – 2013
- Złoty Medal Kraków 2000 – 2003
- Europejska Nagroda Kultury – 2002
- Nagroda Tytana Tytanów na festiwalu Crackfilm za działania na rzecz promocji wizerunku Polski w świecie – 2002
- Medal im. prof. Juliana Aleksandrowicza – 2000
- Medal 40-lecia Programu Fulbrighta w Polsce – 1999
- Honorowa Odznaka „Za zasługi dla województwa krakowskiego” – 1998
- Złota Statuetka Business Centre Club – 1998
- Nagroda Pro Musica Viva za znaczący wkład i osiągnięcia w polskim i międzynarodowym życiu muzycznym – 1997

== Bibliography ==
- "Penderecka Elżbieta". beethoven.org.pl. Archived from the original on 2016-08-29.
