= David A. J. Richards =

American attorney (born 1944)

- Born: March 4, 1944 (age 82)
- Occupations: Lawyer, academic and author
- Title: Edwin D. Webb Professor of Law

Academic background
- Education: Harvard University (AB, JD); Oxford University (DPhil)
- Thesis: A Theory of Reasons for Action (1971)

Academic work
- Discipline: Constitutional rights
- Institutions: Harvard University; Fordham University; New York University

David A. J. Richards is an American constitutional lawyer and moral philosopher, authoring works which integrate interdisciplinary approaches to law and culture. He is the Edwin D. Webb Professor of Law at New York University.

Richards has authored over twenty books including Identity and the Case for Gay Rights: Race, Gender, Religion as Analogies, Free Speech and the Politics of Identity, Patriarchal Religion, Gender, and Sexuality: a Critique of New Natural Law and Boys' Secrets and Men's Loves: a Memoir. He has co-taught for many years an interdisciplinary seminar, Resisting Injustice, with the developmental psychologist Carol Gilligan, resulting in their co-authoring two books on the psychology of resisting injustices rooted in patriarchy. He has also co-taught an interdisciplinary seminar, Retributivism in Criminal Law Theory and Practice, with the psychiatrist of personal and political violence, James Gilligan.

== Education ==
Richards received his Bachelor of Arts degree in Liberal Arts in 1966 from Harvard College. He then earned his D.Phil. in Moral Philosophy from Oxford University in 1970. His doctoral dissertation, A Theory of Reasons for Action was published by Oxford University Press in 1971. He completed his legal education and received his J.D. degree from Harvard Law School in 1971.

== Career ==
After his doctoral studies, Richards got appointed by Harvard University in 1968, and taught as a lecturer in General Education till 1971. He then took a break from academics and worked for Cleary Gottlieb Steen & Hamilton as an Associate for three years. In 1974, Richards joined Fordham University Law School and taught as an Associate Professor for three consecutive years before getting appointed by New York University School of Law in 1977, and teaching as Professor of Law. In 1994, he became the Edwin D. Webb Professor of Law.

== Research ==
Richards has conducted research on developing arguments on decriminalization and toleration as a key constitutional value, gay rights and the distorting impact of patriarchy on interpretation in law and religion. His arguments supporting gay rights were cited by the Indian Supreme Court in its opinion decriminalizing gay sex in India. He has authored over twenty books regarding these disciplines.

=== US Constitution ===
As a teacher of both constitutional and criminal law, Richards has conducted studies of constitutional interpretation in the United States. His books in this area of research include Toleration and the Constitution which was reviewed as "an interesting read" and "a book which touches on many areas of life and thought". In 1989, he published his book, Foundations of American Constitutionalism, for which Rozann Rothman of Indiana University states that "Richards provides a provocative and interesting journey through the ideas and theories of the framers", and that "the outcome of his research is satisfying to all who want the first priority of U.S. Constitutionalism to be the guarantee of in-alienable human rights."

Richards' book, Women, Gays, and the Constitution: The Grounds for Feminism and Gay Rights in Culture and Law was published in 1998 and was reviewed as "an engaging book". Sandra F. VanBurkleo from Wayne State University stated that Richards succeeds in offering an "interpretive proposal as to how Americans might better understand and use the Reconstruction amendments" and that "David Richards's convention-defying resort to the past dignifies and elevates us all".

=== Patriarchy and democracy ===
Richards also writes on patriarchy and democracy. He published his book Italian American: The Racializing of an Ethnic Identity in 1999 and Tragic Manhood and Democracy: Verdi's Voice and the Powers of Musical Art in 2004. His book, "Disarming Manhood: Roots of Ethical Resistance", dealing with nonviolent civil disobedience from Garrison, Tolstoy, Gandhi, to Martin Luther King, was published in the following year and was reviewed as "one of the most important books of our time". Carol Gilligan stated that "this is a book for all mothers of sons—for everyone invested in human survival". In 2005, Richards published The Case for Gay Rights: From Bowers to Lawrence and Beyond.

Richards published The Sodomy Cases: Bowers v. Hardwick and Lawrence v. Texas in 2009 and Fundamentalism in American Religion and Law: Patriarchy as Threat to Democracy in the following year. He has authored two books with Carol Gilligan, entitled The Deepening Darkness: Resistance and Democracy's Future in 2008 and Darkness Now Visible: Patriarchy's Resurgence and Feminist Resistance in 2018.

=== Gay rights ===
Richards' work on gay rights includes his book, The Case for Gay Rights and his memoir, Boys' Secrets and Men's Loves, in which he discusses the connections between his personal life, teaching, and scholarship, during his term at N.Y.U. School of Law. His work on gay rights also include his book in 1982, titled, Sex, Drugs, Death and the Law and Toleration and the Constitution in 1986. Two years later, he published Women, Gays, and the Constitution: The Grounds for Feminism and Gay Rights in Culture and Law, and he published Why Love Leads to Justice: Love Across the Boundaries in 2015. The book dealt with resistance to the Love Laws - forbidding love across the boundaries of race, religion, gender, and caste - by straight and gay and lesbian couples.

Richards published Identity and the Case for Gay Rights in 1999, which was reviewed by Steven Wozniak as "a book about change". He also stated that "this book presents a compelling and ambitious argument for the full recognition of equal rights for gay and lesbian people based upon the United States Constitution."

In 2008, Richards published a book titled, Patriarchal Religion, Gender and Sexuality: A Critique of New Natural Law. Richards published two books regarding gay rights in 2009. A collaborative book by Gilligan and Richards, titled, The Deepening Darkness: Patriarchy, Resistance, and Democracy's Future is a criticism of the ways in which patriarchy distorts the interpretation of various religions, resulting in anti-Semitism and the tension between patriarchal religion and American constitutional democracy. The book was reviewed as an "important study of gender, resistance, and human flourishing".

In 2010, Richards published Fundamentalism in American Religion and Law: Patriarchy as Threat to Democracy, which is a critical study of fundamentalist patriarchal religion in American religion and constitutional law, including its impact on originalism in American constitutional interpretation. In 2013, Richards extended his argument for gay rights, as universal human rights, to other cultures and nations and international politics, publishing The Rise of Gay Rights and the Fall of the British Empire: Liberal Resistance and the Bloomsbury Group.

== Awards and honors ==
- 2000 - American Book Award for Italian American: The Racializing of an Ethnic Identity

== Bibliography ==
=== Selected books ===
- Toleration and the Constitution (1986) ISBN 978-0-19-536308-1
- Foundations of American Constitutionalism (1989) ISBN 978-0-19-505939-7
- The Deepening Darkness: Patriarchy, Resistance, and Democracy's Future (2009) ISBN 978-1-139-47522-8
- The Rise of Gay Rights and the Fall of the British Empire: Liberal Resistance and the Bloomsbury Group (2013) ISBN 978-1-107-03795-3
- Darkness Now Visible: Patriarchy's Resurgence and Feminist Resistance (2018) ISBN 978-1-108-47065-0
- The Antipatriarchal Jesus: Psychoanalysis, Christianities, Love, Ethics, & Democracy (2026) ISBN 979-8-3852-4258-0

=== Selected articles ===
- "Free Speech and Obscenity Law: Toward a Moral Theory of the First Amendment," vol. 123 University of Pennsylvania Law Review at p. 45 (1974)
- "Sexual Autonomy and the Constitutional Right to Privacy: a Case Study in Human Rights and the Unwritten Constitution," vol. 30 Hastings Law Journal at p. 957 (1979)
- "Commercial Sex and the Rights of the Person: A Moral Argument for the Decriminalization of Prostitution," vol. 127 University of Pennsylvania Law Review at p. 1195 (1979)
- "The Individual, the Family, and the Constitution: A Jurisprudential Perspective," vol. 55 New York University Law Review at p. 1 (1980)
- "Constitutional Legitimacy and Constitutional Privacy," vol. 61 New York University Law Review at p. 800 (1986)
