= James Gilligan =

American forensic psychiatrist and author on violence

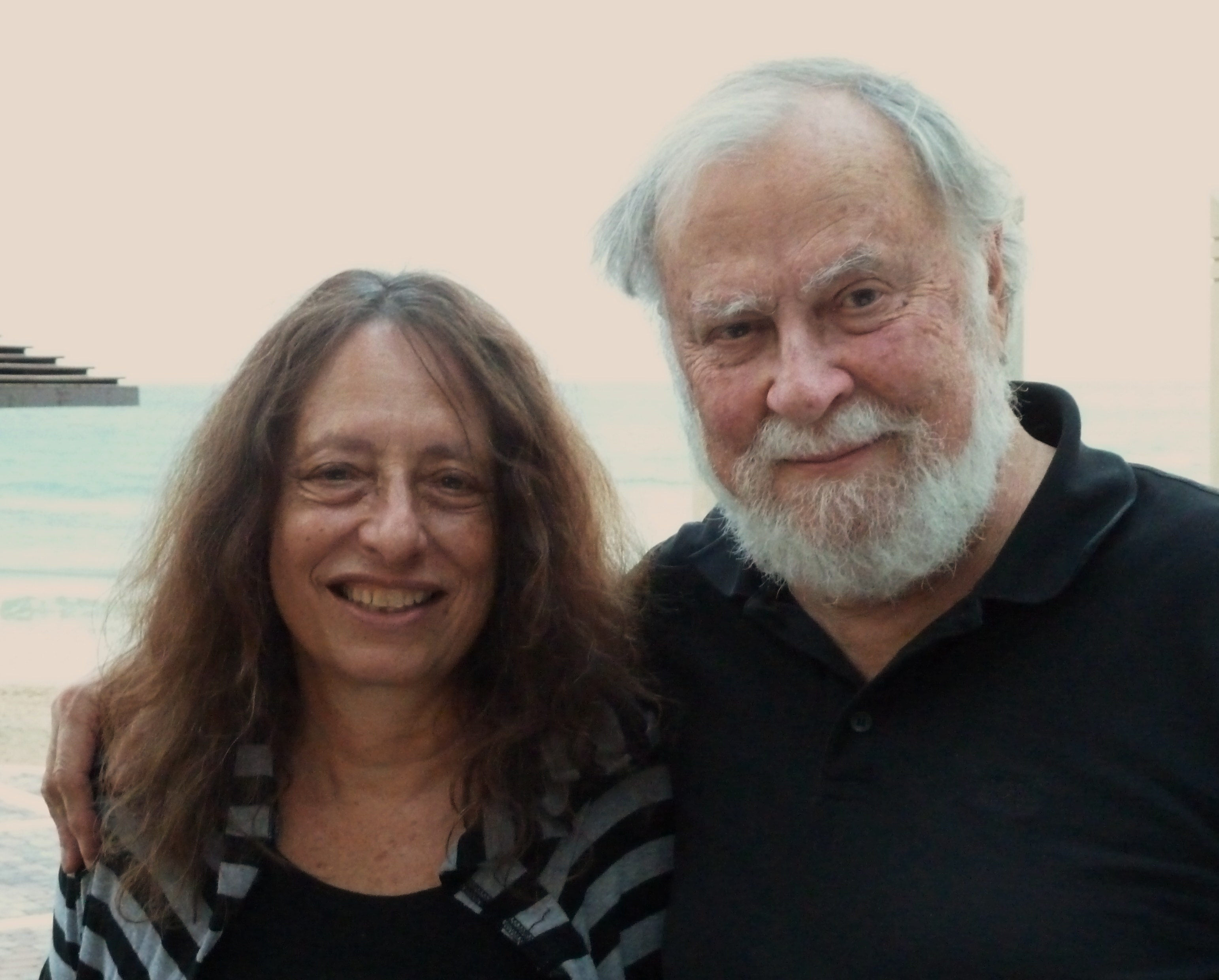
- Carol and James Gilligan
- Education: Harvard College
- Occupation: Professor
- Spouse: Carol Gilligan
- Writing career
- Subjects: Psychology, Violence, Crime

James Gilligan is an American expert on violence. The former director of the Harvard Institute of Law and Psychiatry, he is best known as the author of a series of books entitled Violence.

Gilligan is an adjunct professor of law at New York University School of Law and clinical professor of psychiatry at New York University School of Medicine, and was a visiting professor at the Institute of Criminology in the Faculty of Law at the University of Cambridge.

In 2000, he was appointed by President of the United States Bill Clinton to chair the Committee on Violence Prevention, and in 2005 Secretary-General of the United Nations Kofi Annan requested that he draft the first global study on violence against children.

In 2010, Gilligan was a psychiatric advisor to Martin Scorcese's Shutter Island. He is recognized as Scorcese's model for senior psychiatrist John Cawley, portrayed by Ben Kingsley.

== Education ==
Gilligan obtained a BA from Harvard College in 1957, and trained at the Schools of Medicine of Case Western Reserve University (1961-1965), the University of Chicago (1965-1966), and Harvard University (1966-1969).

== Academic career ==
In 1966, Gilligan joined the faculty of the Department of Psychiatry at Harvard Medical School, where he served until 2000. In 1977, Gilligan became the director of the Harvard Institute of Law and Psychiatry.

In 1991 Gilligan was invited to deliver the Erikson Lectures at Harvard University on the roots of violence. During 1993 and 1994 he was a Visiting Fellow at the Institute of Criminology, University of Cambridge in England, where he expanded his lectures into the book, Violence: Our Deadly Epidemic and Its Causes, published in 1996 by G. P. Putnam's Sons, and republished in paperback in the United States and the United Kingdom in 1997 by Vintage Books and Jessica Kingsley. In 1999, Gilligan was elected president of the International Association for Forensic Psychotherapy.

Gilligan joined the faculty at New York University in 2002, and served as an adjunct professor at New York University School of Law and collegiate professor at New York University's College of Arts and Sciences. Known for his use of English literature, he lectured on the relationship between psychology, law and world literature, teaching the works of William Shakespeare, Joseph Conrad, Leo Tolstoy, and Fyodor Dostoyevsky.

== Psychology ==
Gilligan is known for his work on violence, victims and perpetrators, crime and punishment, innocence and guilt, as well as for his criticism of academic discourses and professional approaches to understanding the causes and consequences of violence.

=== The tragic dimensions of violence ===
In the introduction to Violence: Our Deadly Epidemic and Its Causes, Gilligan argues that "Human violence is much more complicated, ambiguous, and most of all, tragic, than is commonly realized or acknowledged. Much of what has been written about violence, even by those experts who study it—criminologists, criminal lawyers, forensic psychiatrists, moral philosophers, political scientists, and historians—comes only from the point of view of their own specialties, which tend to preclude the tragic dimension of violence. But those who deal with individual violence on a daily basis, judges and lawyers, criminologists and forensic psychiatrists, law-enforcement professionals and prison administrators, are fully aware of how tragic violence is, not only for the victims but also for the perpetrators." According to Gilligan, such "conventions of professional discourse leave little room for the articulation of the tragic point of view, even for those who see the phenomenon itself most clearly."

Gilligan continues, "If we limit ourselves to the mode of discourse of the criminal legal process in the courtroom, only two questions about violence are admissible: how to distinguish the innocent from the guilty; and the guilty from the criminally insane. The problem with this discourse is that it limits our capacity both to understand violence and to prevent it." Gilligan concludes, "This moral, legal framework, which is the existing arena of jurisprudence, judgement, and punishment, often leads to the aggravation of violence and its perpetuation, rather than deterring it. And perhaps no one realizes this more clearly than those very judges and lawyers whose thinking about the problem of violence is confined by necessity to the narrow and limited range of conventional legal discourse." As a result, Gilligan positions tragedy as an interpretative lens to understand violence,

After spending much of my professional career working with violent offenders and with the judges, lawyers, and correctional professionals who are called upon to deal with them, I have come to see the necessity of bringing the discussion of violence into the interpretative arena of tragedy, in the realization that just as tragic drama is always violent, violence itself is always tragic.

== Philosophy ==
As a psychologist, Gilligan has written works on violence in New York and California prisons, the United States, and the Western world. The following works represent his most notable contributions to the fields of psychology and psychoanalysis.

=== Violence: Our Deadliest Epidemic and Its Causes ===
In Violence, Gilligan analyzes a "culture and history of violence," from the closing of the American frontier to the present day, in an attempt to arrive at an understanding of the causes of the various forms of violent behavior. Gilligan argues that it is first necessary to question and reject the moral and legal assumptions that make up the foundations of western ethics and law.

Kirkus Reviews called the book a "deeply compassionate survey of America's contemporary Desolation Row," noting that Gilligan "zeroes in on the pitch-black emptiness within America's murderers." Five Books called the book "profoundly important," highlighted Dr. Gilligan's call to consider and reframe violence as a public health issue, and concluded that "When we begin to see violence in that kind of way it begins to open all sorts of new channels to try and deal with violence in society."

== Violence prevention ==
=== Massachusetts Prisons ===
In 1992, the U.S. District Court in Boston and the Massachusetts Supreme Court—reacting to an epidemic of suicides, homicides, riots, hostage-taking, arson, and mass rapes throughout the state prison system—concluded that much of the violence was the result of severe, undiagnosed, and untreated psychopathology, brought about by the pathogenic conditions within the prisons themselves, such as prolonged solitary confinement, beatings, death threats, post-traumatic stress disorder, and the absence of mental health services. In response, the Boston and Massachusetts Courts ordered the state to bring the level of health care and violence prevention in the prisons up to community standards.

The Massachusetts Department of Correction entered a contract with McLean Hospital and Harvard Medical School to fulfill the obligation. As the McLean Hospital clinician selected to serve as Medical Director of Bridgewater State Hospital, the Massachusetts Prison Hospital for the "criminally insane," and Clinical Director of Mental Health Services for state prisons, Dr. Gilligan supervised the training and clinical practice of Harvard psychiatrists, psychologists, and other mental health professionals. During his tenure as Medical Director of Bridgewater State Hospital, the team succeeded in preventing all further riots from the beginning of the program, and all hostage-taking by the fifth year of the program, reducing the rates of both suicide and homicide to zero for up to a year at a time throughout the state-wide prison system.

=== Boston Miracle ===
In 1996, Paul F. Evans, Commissioner of the Boston Police Department, requested that Dr. Gilligan outline methods to end an epidemic of youth homicides, which tripled by the end of the 1990s. In response, Gilligan organized a group of experts drawn from Harvard Law School, Harvard Medical School, Harvard School of Public Health, and the Kennedy School of Government to design an inter-disciplinary strategy, in collaboration with local clergy and churches, juvenile courts, educators in the Massachusetts school system, police, parole and probation officers, gun dealers, gang members, and families of at-risk youth, to end the epidemic of violence. The program resulted in two and a half years without a single teenage or adult victim of homicide in the City of Boston, a phenomenon referred to as the "Boston Miracle." In 1999, in response to Dr. Gilligan's work in Boston, Senator Edward M. Kennedy, chair of the United States Senate Committee on the Judiciary, invited Dr. Gilligan to present research findings relevant to the implementation of safe schools at the Massachusetts Youth Violence Summit.

== Personal life ==
Gilligan is the husband of American feminist, ethicist, and psychologist Carol Gilligan.

In 2003, Gilligan was honored by Physicians for Social Responsibility. In 2011 he was given a lifetime achievement award by the Institute on Violence, Abuse and Trauma, Family Violence and Sexual Assault Institute, the National Partnership to End Interpersonal Violence Across the Lifespan, and the Children’s Institute.

== Selected bibliography ==
=== Books ===
- Gilligan, J. (1996).Violence: Our Deadly Epidemic and Its Causes. New York: G.P. Putnam's Sons.
- Gilligan, J. (1997). Violence: Reflections on a National Epidemic. New York: Penguin Random House.
- Gilligan, J. (1999). Violence: Reflections on Our Deadliest Epidemic. London: Jessica Kingsley Publishers.
- Gilligan, J. (1999). Violence in America: an Encyclopedia. New York: Charles Scribner's Sons.
- Gilligan, J. (2000).Violence: Reflections on a Western Epidemic. Oxford: Taylor & Francis.
- Gilligan, J. (2000). Violence in California Prisons: A Proposal for Research into Patterns and Cures. Philadelphia: Diane Publishing Co. ISBN 978-0-7567-0680-7
- Gilligan, J. (2001). Preventing Violence: An Agenda for the Coming Century. London: Thames & Hudson.
- Gilligan, J. (2011). Why Some Politicians Are More Dangerous Than Others. Cambridge: Polity.
- A.J. Richards, D. and Gilligan, J. (2021). Holding a Mirror up to Nature: Shame, Guilt, and Violence in Shakespeare. Cambridge: Cambridge University Press. ISBN 978-1-108-83339-4, 978-1-108-97039-6

=== Book chapters ===
- Gilligan, J. “Chronic Schizophrenia: A Review of Recent Clinical Research.” Drug and Social Therapy in Chronic Schizophrenia, edited by Milton Greenblat et al., Charles C. Thomas, 1965, pp. 39-72.
- Gilligan, J. “Beyond Morality: Psychoanalytic Reflections on Shame, Guilt and Love.” Moral Development and Behavior: Theory, Research and Social Issues, edited by Thomas Lickona, Holt McDougal 1976 pp. 144-48.
- Gilligan, J. “Exploring Shame in Special Settings: A Psychotherapeutic Study.” Forensic Psychotherapy: Crime, Psychodynamics and the Offender Patient, vol. II, Jessica Kingsley Publishers, 1995, pp. 475-490.
- Gilligan, J. “The Agenbite of Inwit: Or, The Varieties of Moral Experience." Remorse and Reparation, pp. 33-47.
- Gilligan, J. “Pictures of Pain." Behind the Razor Wire: Portrait of a Contemporary American Prison System.
- Gilligan, J. “Psychological Violence." Violence in America: An Encyclopedia, 1999, pp. 626-631.
- Gilligan, J. “Structural Violence." Violence in America: An Encyclopedia, Charles Scribner's Sons, pp. 229-233.
- Gilligan, J. “Terrorism, Fundamentalism And Nihilism: Analyzing The Dilemmas Of Modernity.” The Future of Prejudice: Applications of Psychoanalytic Understanding toward its Prevention, 2006, pp. 37-62.
- Gilligan, J. “Spare the Rod: Why Are More American Children Victims and Perpetrators of Violence than Those of Any Other Developed Country?” A Child's Right to a Healthy Environment, Springer, 2010, pp. 75-104.
- Gilligan, J. “The Interpretation of Violence.” Aggression: From Fantasy to Action, 2011, pp. 67-95.
- Gilligan, J. “Punishment, Shaming and Violence,” Routledge Handbook of the Philosophy and Practice of Punishment, edited by Farah Focquaert, Elizabeth Shaw and Bruce Waller, Routledge, 2020

=== Journal articles ===
- Gilligan, J. (1998). “Reflections from a Life Behind Bars: Build Colleges, Not Prisons," Chronicle of Higher Education, www.chronicle.com/article/reflections-from-a-life-behind-bars-build-colleges-not-prisons-5196/
- Gilligan, J. (1999). “Civilization and Its Malcontents: Rethinking the Relationship between Violence and Civilization as We Enter the Coming Millennium." At the Threshold of the Millennium, edited by Maria Rosa Fort Brescia et al., Seminario Interdisciplinario de Estudios Andinos, Volume 2, pp. 25-30.
- Gilligan, J. (2000). “Punishment and Violence: Is the Criminal Justice System Based on One Huge Mistake?” Social Research, vol. 67(3): 745-772. https://www.jstor.org/stable/40971409
- Gilligan, J. (2000). “Violence as a Problem in Public Health and Preventive Medicine,” The Lancet
- Gilligan, J. (2001). “The Last Mental Hospital,” Psychiatric Quarterly, vol. 72 (1): 45-61.
- Gilligan, J. (2003). “Shame, Guilt and Violence,” Social Research, vol. 70 (4): 1149-1180.
- Gilligan, J. (2004). “Youth Violence: Scientific Approaches to Prevention,” Annals of the New York Academy of Sciences, vol. 1036 (1): 9-12. https://nyaspubs.onlinelibrary.wiley.com/toc/17496632/2004/1036/1
- Gilligan, J. (2009). “Sex, Gender and Violence,” British Journal of Psychotherapy, vol. 25(2): 239-256, 2009. https://onlinelibrary.wiley.com/doi/abs/10.1111/j.1752-0118.2009.01118.x
- Gilligan, J. (2015). “Editorial - Special Issue on the Application of Psychoanalysis to Violent Offenders,” International Journal of Applied Psychoanalytic Studies, vol. 12(2): 89-95, 2015.
- Gilligan, J. (2015). “A Modest Proposal to Universalize the Insanity Defense and Replace Prisons and Punishment with Treatment and Education,” International Journal of Applied Psychoanalytic Studies, vol.12(2): 134-142, 2015. https://onlinelibrary.wiley.com/doi/abs/10.1002/aps.1444
- Gilligan, J. (2016). “Can psychoanalysis help us to understand the causes and prevention of violence?” Psychoanalytic Psychotherapy. https://www.tandfonline.com/doi/full/10.1080/02668734.2016.1169768
- Gilligan, J. (2017). “Toward a psychoanalytic theory of violence, fundamentalism and terrorism,” International Forum of Psychoanalysis. https://www.tandfonline.com/doi/abs/10.1080/0803706X.2017.1333145
