= 30th Locarno Film Festival =

Film festival in Locarno, Switzerland

- Location: Locarno, Switzerland
- Founded: 1946
- Awards: Golden Leopard: Antonio Gramsci: The Days of Prison directed by Lino del Fra
- Artistic director: Moritz de Hadeln
- Festival date: 4 August 1977 – 14 August 1977
- Website: Locarno Film Festival

Locarno Film Festival
- 31st 29th

The 30th Locarno Film Festival was held from 4 to 14 August 1977 in Locarno, Switzerland. One of the festival highlights was La Paloma, directed by Daniel Schmid, a director discovered by This Brunner. The experimental film Amerikai Anzix [American Souvenir] was met with more walk-outs than any others, while Annie Hall was screened twice due to audience enthusiasm.

The year's Cannes Palme d'Or winner Padre Padrone, directed by Paolo and Vittorio Taviani, was also shown at the festival. The festival's night showings were very popular and singlehandedly earned back a third of the festival's $200,000 budget.

The Golden Leopard, the festival's top prize, was awarded to Antonio Gramsci: The Days of Prison, directed by Lino del Fra.

== Jury ==
- Nelson Pereira dos Santos, Jury President
- Jean-Luc Bideau, Swiss actor
- Anja Breien, Norwegian director
- Istvan Dosai, Hungarian producer
- Lino Miccichè, Italian film critic

== Official sections ==
The following films were screened in these sections:

=== Principal program ===
Feature Films in Competition

Original title	English title	Director(s)	Year	Country of origin
Ajuricaba, o Rebelde da Amazônia		Oswaldo Caldeira	1977	Brazil
Antonio Gramsci, I Giorni Di Carcere	Antonio Gramsci: The Days of Prison	Lino Del Fra	1977	Italy
Cascabel	The Rattlesnake	Raúl Araiza	1977	Mexico
Dagny		Haakon Sandøy	1977	Norway, Poland
Der Hauptdarsteller	The Leading Man	Reinhard Hauff	1977	West Germany
Derniere Sortie Avant Roissy	Last Exit Before Roissy	Bernard Paul	1977	France
Venok sonetov	A Wreath of Sonnets	Valeri Rubinchik	1977	Soviet Union
Les Indiens Sont Encore Loin	The Indians Are Still Far Away	Patricia Moraz	1977	France Switzerland
Muerte al amanecer	Death at Dawn	Francisco José Lombardi	1977	Peru, Venezuela
Passing Through		Larry Clark	1977	United States
Pokfoci	Spider Football	János Rózsa	1977	Hungary
Pour Clémence	For Clemence	Charles Belmont	1977	France
San Gottardo		Villi Hermann	1977	Switzerland
Soy Un Delincuente	I Am a Delinquent	Clemente de la Cerda	1976	Venezuela
Sven Klangs kvintett	Sven Klang's Combo	Stellan Olsson	1976	Sweden
The Guest: An Episode in the Life of Eugène Marais		Ross Devenish	1977	South Africa
The Rubber Gun		Allan Moyle	1977	Canada
Un anno di scuola	A Year of School	Franco Giraldi	1977	Italy

Official information

Original title	English title	Director(s)	Year	Country of origin
El Sayed El Takadomy		Nabil Maleh	1974	Syria
Bolwieser	The Stationmaster's Wife	Rainer Werner Fassbinder	1977	West Germany
Haixia		Chen Huai'ai, Qian Jiang		China
Jane Bleibt Jane	Jane is Jane Forever	Walter Bockmayer, Rolf Bührmann	1977	West Germany
Mababangong Bangungot	Perfumed Nightmare	Kidlat Tahimik	1977	Philippines
Padre Padrone		Paolo and Vittorio Taviani	1977	Italy
Tenda Dos Milagres	Tent of Miracles	Nelson Pereira dos Santos	1977	Brazil
Una giornata particolare	A Special Day	Ettore Scola	1977	Canada, Italy

=== Out of Competition ===
Original title	English title	Director(s)	Year	Country of origin
Annie Hall		Woody Allen	1977	United States
Gli Ultimi Tre Giorni	The Last Three Days	Gianfranco Mingozzi	1977	Italy
The Car		Elliot Silverstein	1977	United States

=== Film Critics Week ===
FIPRESCI - International Federation of Film Critics Week
Original title	English title	Director(s)	Year	Country of origin
Amerikai Anzix	American Torso	Gábor Bódy	1975	Hungary
Åpenbaringen	The Revelation	Vibeke Løkkeberg	1977	Norway
Der Umsetzer		Brigitte Toni Lecht, Benno Trautmann	1976	West Germany
Doda Clara	Aunt Clara	Avram Heffner	1977	Israel
Nós por cá Todos Bem	Except for This, Everything is All Right at Home	Fernando Lopes	1977	Portugal
Pani Bovary To Ja	Madame Bovary, That's Me	Zbigniew Kaminski	1977	Poland
Paradiso		Christian Bricout	1977	France

=== Special sections ===
==== Open Forum ====
Open Forum
English title	Original title	Director(s)	Year	Country of origin
The Expulsion from Paradise	Die Vertreibung aus dem Paradies	Niklaus Schilling	1977	West Germany
Europe '51	Europa '51	Roberto Rossellini	1952	Italy
Fortini/Cani		Danièle Huillet, Jean-Marie Straub	1976	France, Italy, United Kingdom, United States
Here and Elsewhere	Ici Et Ailleurs	Jean-Luc Godard, Anne-Marie Miéville	1976	France
Nine Months	Kilenc hónap	Márta Mészáros	1976	Hungary
The Lorry	Le Camion	Marguerite Duras	1977	France
The Devil, Probably	Le diable probablement	Robert Bresson	1977	France
News From Home		Chantal Akerman	1976	Belgium, France, West Germany
Omar Gatlato		Merzak Allouache	1977	Algeria
Invisible Adversaries	Unsichtbare Gegner	Valie Export	1977	Austria
The Betrayer	Vanina Vanini	Roberto Rossellini	1961	France, Italy

==== Retrospectives ====
Retrospective: Citel Films Geneva
Original title	English title	Director(s)	Year	Country of origin
Black Out		Jean-Louis Roy	1970	Switzerland
Celine Et Julie Vont En Bateau	Celine and Julie Go Boating	Jacques Rivette	1974	France
Docteur Françoise Gailland		Jean-Louis Bertuccelli	1976	France
Jonas qui aura 25 ans en l'an 2000	Jonas Who will be 25 in the Year 2000	Alain Tanner	1976	France, Switzerland
L'Invitation	The Invitation	Claude Goretta	1973	France, Switzerland
La dentellière	The Lacemaker	Claude Goretta	1977	France, Switzerland, West Germany
La fille au violoncelle	The Girl with the Cello	Yvan Butler	1973	France, Switzerland
La Paloma	La Paloma	Daniel Schmid	1974	France, Switzerland
Le juge Fayard dit Le Shériff	Judge Fayard Called the Sheriff	Yves Boisset	1977	France
Le milieu du monde	The Middle of the World	Alain Tanner	1974	France, Switzerland
Les arpenteurs	The Surveyors	Michel Soutter	1972	Switzerland
Les vilaines manières	The Awful Manners	Simon Edelstein	1973	France, Switzerland
Pas si méchant que ça	The Wonderful Crook	Claude Goretta	1975	France, Switzerland
Providence		Alain Resnais	1977	France, Switzerland
Retrospective: Mauritz Stiller
Original title	English title	Director(s)	Year	Country of origin
Alexander den Store	Alexander the Great	Mauritz Stiller	1917	Sweden
Erotikon		Mauritz Stiller	1920	Sweden
Gunnar Hedes saga	The Blizzard	Mauritz Stiller	1923	Sweden
Herr Arnes pengar	Sir Arne's Treasure	Mauritz Stiller	1919	Sweden
Johan		Mauritz Stiller	1921	Sweden
Kärlek och journalistik	Love and Journalism	Mauritz Stiller	1916	Sweden
Mauritz Stiller		Mauritz Stiller	1969	Sweden
Sången om den eldröda blomman	Song of the Scarlet Flower	Mauritz Stiller	1919	Sweden
Thomas Graals bästa barn	Thomas Graal's Best Child	Mauritz Stiller	1918	Sweden
Thomas Graals bästa film	Wanted - A Film Actress	Mauritz Stiller	1917	Sweden

==== Swiss information ====
Swiss information
Original title	English title	Director(s)	Year	Country of origin
Das Unglück		Georg Radanowicz	1976	Switzerland, West Germany
Lieber Herr Doktor		Hans Stürm	1977	Switzerland
Pagine di vita dell'emigrazione		Alvaro Bizzarri	1973	Switzerland, West Germany
Une dionée		Michel Rodde	1976	Switzerland

== Official awards ==
=== International Jury ===
- Golden Leopard: Antonio Gramsci: The Days of Prison by Lino del Fra
- Silver Leopard: San Gottardo by Villi Hermann
- Ernest Artaria Prize: The Guest writer Athos Fugard
- International Jury special Prize: Pokfoci actor Jozsef Madaras
- International Jury Mention: The Indians Are Still Far Away by Patricia Moraz, Soy Un Delincuente by Clemente de la Cedra, Passing Through by Larry Clark

=== Oecumenical Jury ===
- Oecumenical Jury Prize: The Guest by Ross Devenish
- Oecumenical Jury Mention: The Indians Are Still Far Away by Patricia Moraz, Muerto Al Amanecer by Francisco Jose Lombardi

=== FIPRESCI Jury ===
- International Critics Award: Pani Bovary To Ja by Zbiginiew Kaminski, Jane Bleibt Jane by Walter Bockmayer and Rolf Bührmann
