= Cecilia Mangini =

Italian film director (1927–2021)

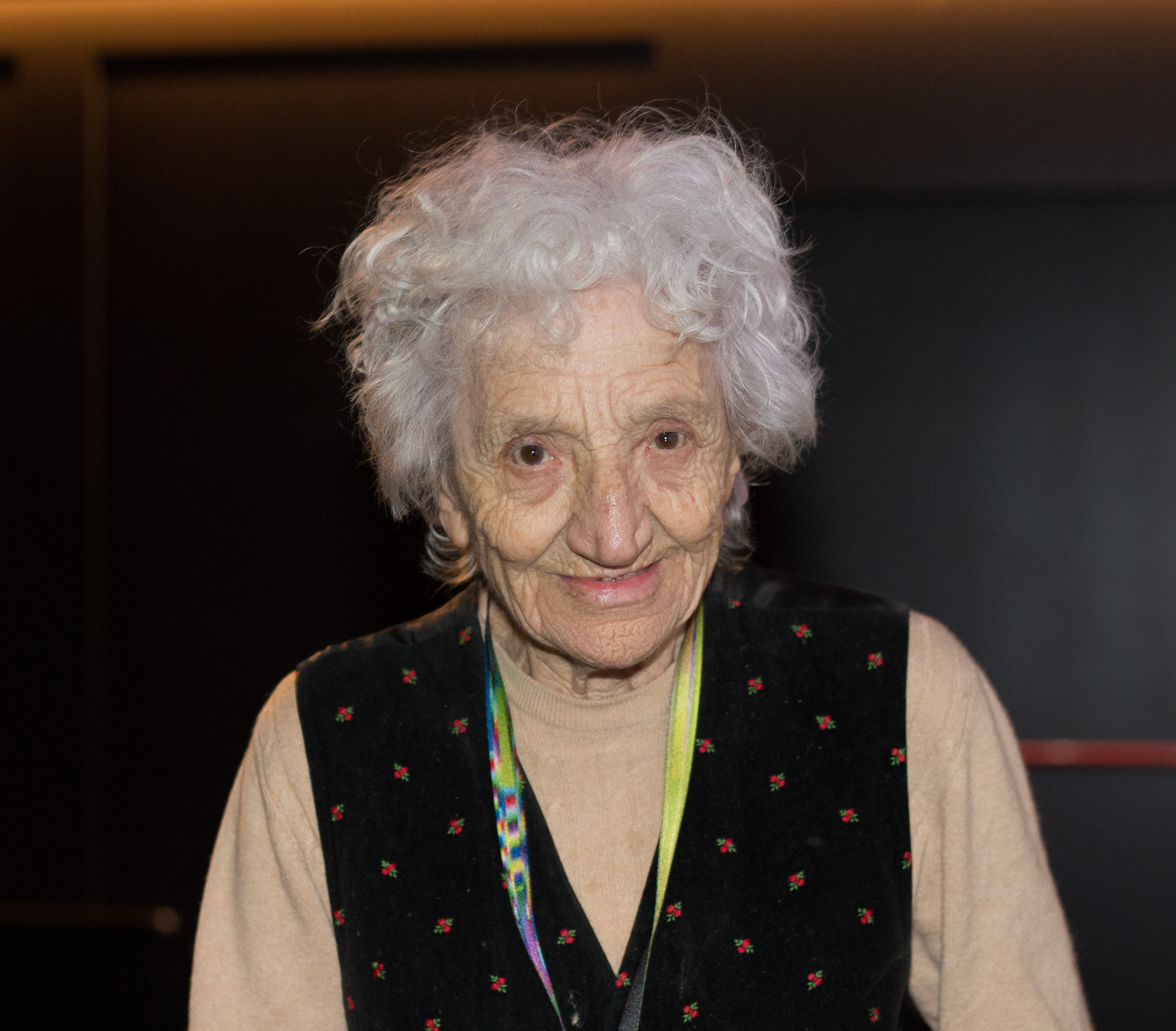
Cecilia Mangini in 2020

Cecilia Mangini (31 July 1927 – 21 January 2021) was an Italian film director, considered the first female documentary filmmaker in Italy.

In 1958, her first documentary was released, titled Ignoti alla Città (Unknown to the City). Written by Pier Paolo Pasolini, the film focused on adolescents in Rome's suburbs after World War II.

Mangini died on 21 January 2021 in Rome.

== Personal life ==
Born in 1927 in Mola di Bari, Italy, Mangini moved with her family to Florence at age six, when her father's leather business failed. She then moved to Rome in 1952 and worked in a film club federation, where she met and eventually married Lino Del Fra, with whom she collaborated on several film projects.

== Filmography ==
=== Director ===
- Ignoti alla città (1958)
- Maria e i giorni (1959)
- Firenze di Pratolini (1959)
- La canta delle marane (1960)
- Stendalì - Suonano ancora, (1960)
- La passione del grano, co-directed with Lino Del Fra (1960)
- Fata Morgana, co-directed with Lino del Fra (1961)
- All'armi, siam fascisti!, co-directed with Lino del Fra and Lino Miccichè (1962)
- La statua di Stalin, co-directed with Lino del Fra (1963)
- Divino amore (1963)
- Trieste del mio cuore (1964)
- Pugili a Brugherio (1965)
- Felice Natale (1965)
- Essere donne (1965)
- Brindisi '65 (1966)
- Tommaso (1967)
- Domani vincerò (1969)
- La briglia sul collo (1974)
- In viaggio con Cecilia, co-directed with Mariangela Barbanente (2013)
- Due scatole dimenticate – un viaggio in Vietnam, co-directed with Paolo Pisanelli (2020)

=== Screenwriter ===
- Firenze di Pratolini (1959)
- Stendalì - Suonano ancora (1960)
- All'armi, siam fascisti!, directed by Lino Del Fra, Cecilia Mangini and Lino Miccichè (1962)
- La torta in cielo, directed by Lino Del Fra (1970)
- Black Holiday, directed by Marco Leto (1973)
- Antonio Gramsci: The Days of Prison, directed by Lino Del Fra (1977)
- Klon, directed by Lino Del Fra (1994)
- Regina Coeli, directed by Nico D'Alessandria (2000)
- In viaggio con Cecilia, directed by Mariangela Barbanente and Cecilia Mangini (2013)

== Sources ==
- Casadio, Gianfranco (1997). La guerra al cinema : i film di guerra nel cinema italiano dal 1944 al 1996 (in Italian). Ravenna: Angelo Longo Editore. ISBN 88-8063-131-4. OCLC 37897234.
