= Black Holiday =

1973 film

- Film poster
- Directed by: Marco Leto
- Written by: Lino Del Fra; Marco Leto; Cecilia Mangini
- Produced by: Enzo Giulioli
- Starring: Adalberto Maria Merli; Adolfo Celi; Milena Vukotic; John Steiner
- Cinematography: Volfango Alfi
- Edited by: Giuseppe Giacobino
- Music by: Egisto Macchi
- Release date: 13 November 1973
- Running time: 112 minutes
- Country: Italy
- Language: Italian

Black Holiday (Italian: La villeggiatura) is a 1973 Italian political drama film directed by Marco Leto and starring Adalberto Maria Merli and Adolfo Celi.

== Cast ==
- Adolfo Celi as Commissioner Rizzuto
- Adalberto Maria Merli as Franco Rossini
- John Steiner as Scagnetti
- Luigi Uzzo as Massanesi
- Aldo De Correllis as Prisoner
- Gianfranco Barra as Priest
- Silvio Anselmo as Inventor
- Vito Cipolla as Renzetti
- Roberto Herlitzka as Guasco
- Biagio Pelligra as Mastrodonato
- Giuliano Petrelli as Nino
- Nello Riviè as Prisoner
- Milena Vukotic as Daria Rossini
