= Doheny =

Doheny is an Irish surname. Notable people with the surname include:

- Ed Doheny (1873–1916), American baseball player
- Edward Laurence Doheny (1856–1935), American oil tycoon
- Jer Doheny (1874–1929), Irish sportsman
- John Doheny (born 1953), American jazz musician
- Lawrence Doheny (1924–1982), American television director
- Michael Doheny (1805–1863), Irish writer and politician
- Ned Doheny, American singer, songwriter and guitarist
- Megan Doheny, American professional wrestler

== See also ==
- Doheny & Nesbitt – Victorian Pub in Dublin, Ireland
- Doheny Eye Institute, a nonprofit ophthalmic research institute.
- Doheny Drive, a major north/south thoroughfare of Beverly Hills and West Hollywood, California
- Doheny State Beach, a California state park
- Doheny Library, on the campus of the University of Southern California
- Doheny Plaza, high-rise building in West Hollywood, California.
- Greystone Mansion, also known as the Doheny Mansion, Beverly Hills, California
- Doheny, one of the two campuses of Mount St. Mary's College, Los Angeles, California
- Dohenys GAA, a Gaelic Athletic Association club in Dunmanway, County Cork, Ireland
