= Cugino & cugino =

- Country of origin: Italy
- Original language: Italian
- No. of seasons: 1
- No. of episodes: 12

Original release
- Network: Rai 1
- Release: February 22 – March 22, 2011

Cugino & cugino was a 2011 television series. The series had one season of twelve episodes, which were broadcast over six nights.

== Cast ==
- Giulio Scarpati: Filippo Raimondi
- Nino Frassica: Carmelo Mancuso
- Gabriele Caprio: Marco Raimondi
- Denny Méndez: Eleonora Muñez
- Pierpaola Janvier: Margherita
- Euridice Axen: dott.ssa Monica Fontana
- Giorgio Borghetti; Alex Maini
- Edy Angelillo: Anna Fissore
- Francesco Scali: Nerone
- Francesco Paolantoni: Babà

== Episodes ==
No.	Title Italian	Title English	Directed by	Original release date
1	"Cugini e segreti"	Cousins and Secrets	Vittorio Sindoni	February 22, 2011
2	"Benvenuto zio Carmelo"	Welcome Uncle Carmelo	Vittorio Sindoni	February 22, 2011
3	"L'attorcuoco"	The Cook Actor	Vittorio Sindoni	February 24, 2011
4	"Alla ricerca di Tris"	Looking for Tris	Vittorio Sindoni	February 24, 2011
5	"Dove si dorme in tre si può dormire in quattro"	Where You Sleep in Three You Can Sleep in Four	Vittorio Sindoni	March 1, 2011
6	"Sono innocente!"	I'm Innocent!	Vittorio Sindoni	March 1, 2011
7	"Artisti per caso"	Artists for Case	Vittorio Sindoni	March 8, 2011
8	"Il tesoretto"	Treasury	Vittorio Sindoni	March 8, 2011
9	"Offresi cuoco disperatamente"	Offer Desperately Cook	Vittorio Sindoni	March 15, 2011
10	"Prigionieri di un sogno"	Prisoners of a Dream	Vittorio Sindoni	March 15, 2011
11	"Salvate Khadija"	Saved Khadija	Vittorio Sindoni	March 22, 2011
12	"Cugini per sempre"	Cousins Forever	Vittorio Sindoni	March 22, 2011

== See also ==
- List of Italian television series
