= Euridice Axen =

Italian actress (born 1980)

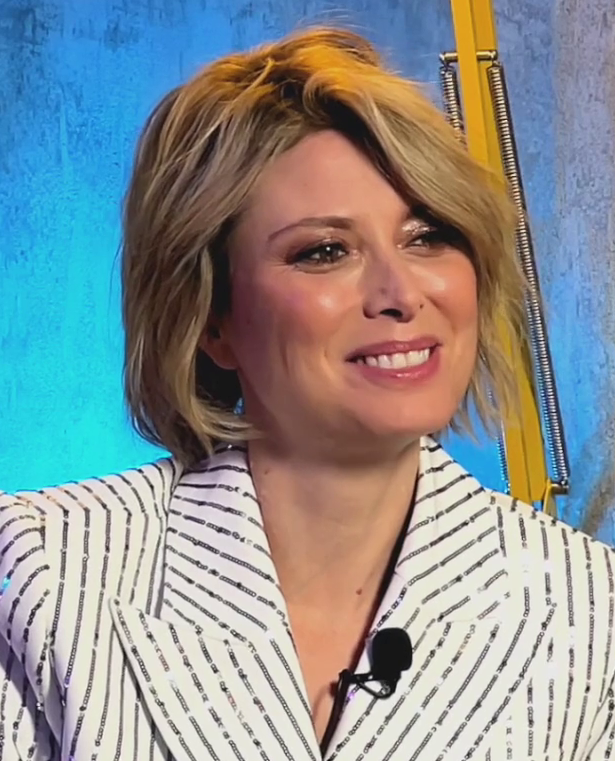
- Axen in 2024
- Born: Euridice Evita Axen; 20 September 1980 (age 46); Rome, Italy
- Citizenship: Italy; Sweden
- Occupation: Actress
- Years active: 1999–present
- Parents: Adalberto Maria Merli (father); Eva Axén (mother)

Euridice Evita Axen (Italian pronunciation: [euriˈdiːtʃe ˈaksen]; born 20 September 1980) is an Italian actress.

== Early life ==
Euridice is the daughter of the Swedish actress Eva Axén and of the Italian actor, director, and dubber Adalberto Maria Merli. Euridice bears her maternal surname by mutual agreement of her parents.

== Filmography ==
=== Cinema ===
Year	Title	Director	Role
2015	Crushed Lives – Il sesso dopo i figli	Alessandro Colizzi	Olivia
2017	The End?	Daniele Misischia	Marta
2018	Loro	Paolo Sorrentino	Tamara
2018	Bene ma non benissimo	Francesco Mandelli	Luisa
2019	Nati 2 volte	Pierluigi Di Lallo	Paola
2020	The Players	Stefano Mordini	Suspicious Wife
2021	Diversamente	Max Nardari	Erika
2021	Per tutta la vita	Paolo Costella	Delia
2023	La tentazione di esistere	Fabio Pellegrinelli	Paola Galli
2024	Volare	Margherita Buy	Cristina
2024	Succede anche nelle migliori famiglie	Alessandro Siani	Deborah
2024	Io e te dobbiamo parlare	Alessandro Siani	Amanda Marsala
2026	Scuola di seduzione	Carlo Verdone	Gaia

=== Television ===
Year(s)	Title	Role	Note(s)
2005–2006	CentoVetrine	Monica Graziosi	—N/a
2006–2007	Vivere	Valeria Castri	—N/a
2008	Carabinieri	Marzia Cherubini	Episode 7×22
2009–2010	Medicina generale	Letizia Conti	—N/a
2010–2012	R.I.S. Roma – Delitti imperfetti	Captain Lucia Brancato	—N/a
2011	Cugino & cugino	Monica Fontana	—N/a
2016	L'ispettore Coliandro	Anna	Episode 5×06
2016	The Young Pope		Episode 1×04
2019	Il processo	Mara Raimondi	—N/a
2021	40 & Climbing	Isabella	Television film
2021	Carla	Esmée Bulnes	Television film
2021	An Astrological Guide for Broken Hearts	Barbara Buchneim	—N/a
2021–2023	A casa tutti bene – La serie	Elettra	—N/a
2022	Il segno delle donne	Luisa Spagnoli	Episode 3×02
2023	Essere Moana – Segreti e misteri	Moana Pozzi	—N/a
2024	Illuminate	Herself/narrator	Episode 6×04
2025	Tutta scena		—N/a
2026	Gigolò per caso	Elsa	Episode 2×05
