= Adalberto Maria Merli =

Italian actor and voice actor

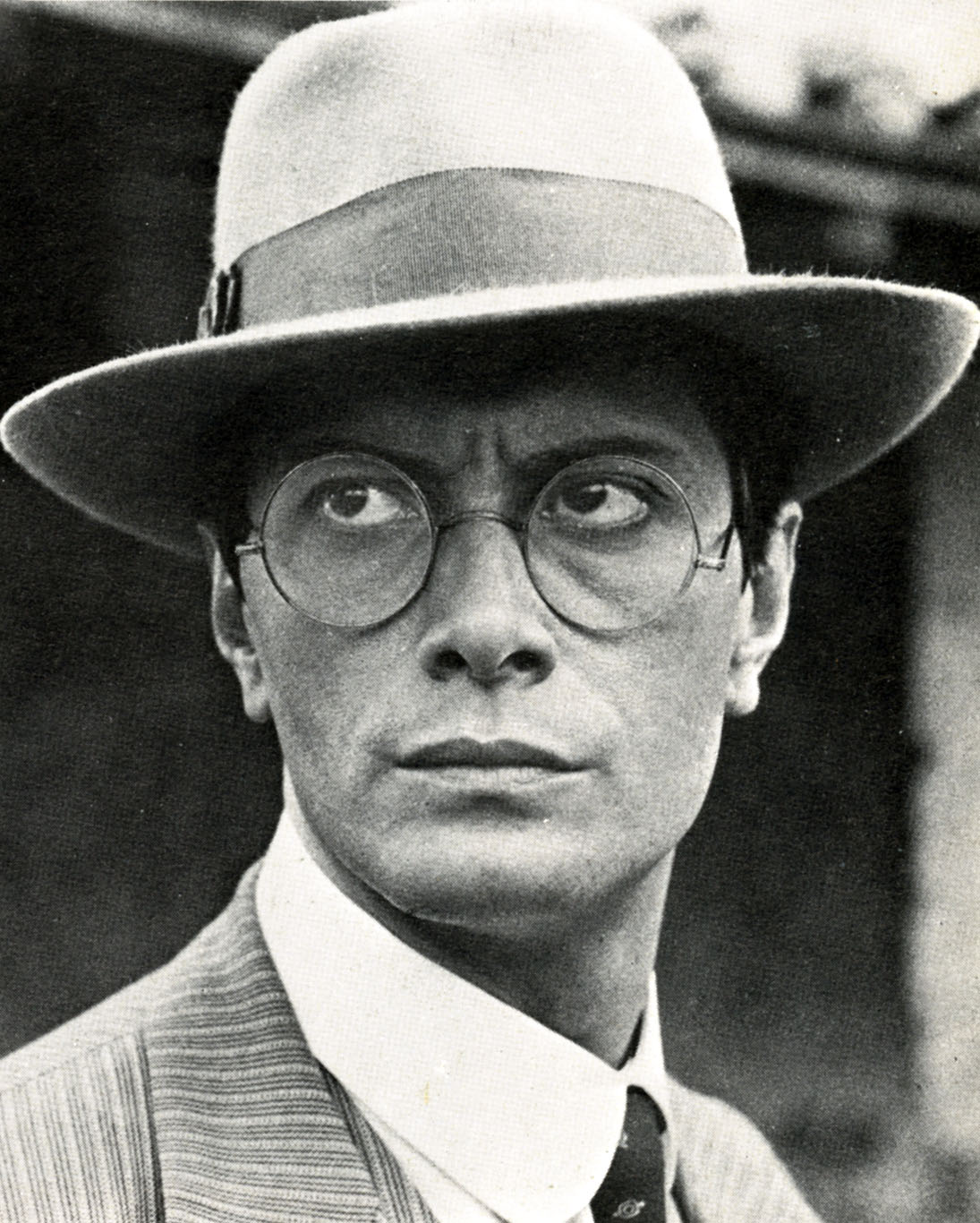
- Merli in Black Holiday (1973)
- Born: 14 January 1938 (age 87); Rome, Italy
- Occupations: Actor; voice actor
- Years active: 1965–present
- Children: Euridice Axen

Adalberto Maria Merli (born 14 January 1938) is an Italian actor and voice actor.

== Biography ==
Born in Rome, Merli is active on film and television and he has appeared in over 27 films since 1965. He had his breakout role in the 1968 RAI television series La freccia nera. After some further television success through the TV series Le terre di Sacramento and E le stelle stanno a guardare Merli made his film debut in the 1971 Miklós Jancsó's drama film La tecnica e il rito, then he became quite active in films of "poliziottesco" or political genre, often in leading roles.

Merli is also active as a voice actor. He is known for having dubbed over the voices of Clint Eastwood, Ed Harris, Robert Redford, Jack Nicholson, David Carradine, Brian Cox, Malcolm McDowell and Michael Caine in some of their films. In his Italian dubbed animation roles, he voiced James P. Sullivan in Monsters, Inc., Mr. Incredible in The Incredibles, The Spirit of the West in Rango, and Pacha in The Emperor's New Groove.

=== Personal life ===
From Merli's relationship with the Swedish actress Eva Axén, he has one daughter, Euridice Axen, born in 1980. Euridice holds her mother’s surname.

== Filmography ==
- Roma (1972) - Narrator (voice, uncredited)
- The Hassled Hooker (1972) - Claudio Santini
- Indian Summer (1972) - Gerardo Favani
- Black Holiday (1973) - Franco Rossini
- Flatfoot (1973) - Police Commissioner Tabassi
- Processo per direttissima (1974) - Brigadiere Pendicò
- La femme aux bottes rouges (1974) - Man
- Peur sur la ville (1975) - Pierre Valdeck / Minos
- Faccia di spia (1975) - Captain Felix Ramos
- Le Gang (1977) - Manu
- Per questa notte (1977) - Ossorio
- Sciopèn (1982) - Andrea Serano
- Cento giorni a Palermo (1984) - Mafioso
- Let's Hope It's a Girl (1986) - Cesare Molteni (uncredited)
- L'orchestre rouge (1989) - Berg
- Duel of Hearts (1991, TV Movie) - Grimaldi
- State Secret (1995) - Ermes Ravida
- Stupor mundi (1997) - The Pope
- The Dinner (1998) - Bricco
- Crimine contro crimine (1998) - Monzi
- The Card Player (2004) - Police Commissioner

== Dubbing roles ==
=== Animation ===
- Pacha in The Emperor's New Groove
- James P. "Sulley" Sullivan in Monsters, Inc., Mike's New Car, Sulley Car in Cars
- Bob Parr / Mr. Incredible in The Incredibles
- Spirit of the West in Rango

=== Live action ===
- Frankie Dunn in Million Dollar Baby
- Agamemnon in Troy
- Randle Patrick McMurphy in One Flew Over the Cuckoo's Nest
- Christof in The Truman Show
- Eric "Rick" Masters in To Live and Die in L.A.
- The Big Man in Dogville
- Alex DeLarge in A Clockwork Orange
- Bill in Kill Bill: Volume 1, Kill Bill: Volume 2
- Dušan Gavrić in The Peacemaker
- Jonathan Lansdale in The Hand
- Allan Quatermain in The League of Extraordinary Gentlemen
- Mark Hunter in Beyond a Reasonable Doubt
- Ed Crane in The Man Who Wasn't There
- Lieutenant Riker in The Secret of the Sahara
- Sam Quint in Black Moon Rising
- Stephen Malley in Lions for Lambs
- Harman Sullivan in Charley Varrick
- Jack Sclavino in Live Free or Die Hard
- Harry Bailey in Getting Straight
- Veteran Gangster in Gangster No. 1
- Sam Lawson in Too Late the Hero
- Thomas Fowler in The Quiet American
- Joaquin Manero in The Morning After

=== Video games ===
- Bob Parr / Mr. Incredible in The Incredibles, The Incredibles: Rise of the Underminer
