= Al piacere di rivederla =

1976 film

- Directed by: Marco Leto
- Written by: Ruggero Maccari; Maurizio Costanzo; Paolo Levi; Marco Leto
- Produced by: Lucio Ardenzi
- Starring: Ugo Tognazzi
- Cinematography: Ennio Guarnieri
- Music by: Fred Bongusto
- Release date: 1976
- Running time: 102 minutes
- Country: Italy
- Language: Italian

Al piacere di rivederla is a 1976 Italian giallo-comedy film directed by Marco Leto. It is based on the novel Ritratto di provincia in rosso by Paolo Levi.

== Cast ==
- Ugo Tognazzi: Mario Aldara
- Françoise Fabian: Viviana Bonfigli
- Miou-Miou: Patrizia
- Alberto Lionello: Don Luigi
- Franco Graziosi: Pietro Bonfigli
- Biagio Pelligra: Maresciallo dei Carabinieri
- Maria Monti: Bianca Bonfigli
- Philippe March: Morlacchi
- Cesarina Gheraldi: La vecchia Bonfigli
- Paolo Bonacelli: the moneylender
- Claudio Bigagli:
- Roberto Longo:
- Francesco Comegna:
- Lia Tanzi:
- Barbara Nay:
- Shirley Corrigan:
- Lino Coletta:
- Angelo Botti:

== See also ==
- List of Italian films of 1976
