= Pesaro International Film Festival =

Italian film festival

Mostra internazionale del Nuovo Cinema di Pesaro
- Location: Pesaro, Italy
- Founded: 1964
- Founded by: Lino Micciché and Bruno Torri
- Website: pesarofilmfest.it

The Pesaro International Film Festival (Italian: Mostra internazionale del Nuovo Cinema di Pesaro) is one of the most important Italian film festivals, representing historically an alternative to the Venice Film Festival for what concerns both for the political view and the choices of films it screened. The festival of Pesaro, especially in its early years, kept an agenda of praising and discussing the craft of cinema without following the film star system.

Founded and designed in Rome by Lino Miccichè and Bruno Torri at the end of 1964, the event took place in Pesaro since the first edition (29 May - 6 June 1965), the exhibition is promoted, financed, and managed by the Pesaro Nuovo Cinema Onlus Foundation with the contribution from the Municipality of Pesaro, the Province of Pesaro and Urbino, the Marche Region, the Ministry for Cultural Heritage and Activities, the Media Program of the European Union.

== History ==
=== Early years ===
In the first four editions, the exhibition became a sort of world reference point for cinematographic renewal, with the participation, among others, of Joris Ivens, Roberto Rossellini, Cesare Zavattini, Jean-Marie Straub, Bernardo Bertolucci, Jonas Mekas, Jerzy Skolimowski, Jean- Luc Godard, Pier Paolo Pasolini, Glauber Rocha. Among the hundreds of films presented in the four-year period between 1965 and 1968, there are almost all the major achievements of the Czechoslovak New Wave, titles of the new cinema in Budapest, of the Soviet, Polish, Romanian and less conformist German-democratic cinema.

The first four years of the event were the 'golden season' of the Pesaro exhibition, there were international meetings that took place annually there: both those on the concrete problems of the production, circulation and diffusion of the 'new cinema' which took place in 1965, in 1966 (in collaboration with UNESCO), and in 1967 as the first congress of the International Center for the diffusion of new cinema, promoted by the Festival itself; and those dedicated to filmmakers and / or cinematographers, generally organised in small specific reviews, such as Introduction to the new Czechoslovak cinema (1965), Encounter with the new German cinema (1966), The New American Cinema (1967), Latin American Cinema: culture as action (1968, on the occasion of the world premiere of La hora de los hornos by Fernando E. Solanas and Octavio Getino), and finally the most famous ones "for a new criticism", namely La critics and the new cinema (1965), For a new critical awareness of cinematographic language (1966), Language and ideology in film (1967).

The first golden season closed with 1968, the year in which - after the closing of the Cannes Film Festival contested and interrupted by filmmakers - the Festival was the first Italian cultural institution to be contested: but the management opened the doors to students and he called an assembly in front of which he resigned accepting a technical coordination that guaranteed the screening of all the films on the program but not the collateral initiatives.
