= Toner's Pub =

Pub in Dublin, Ireland

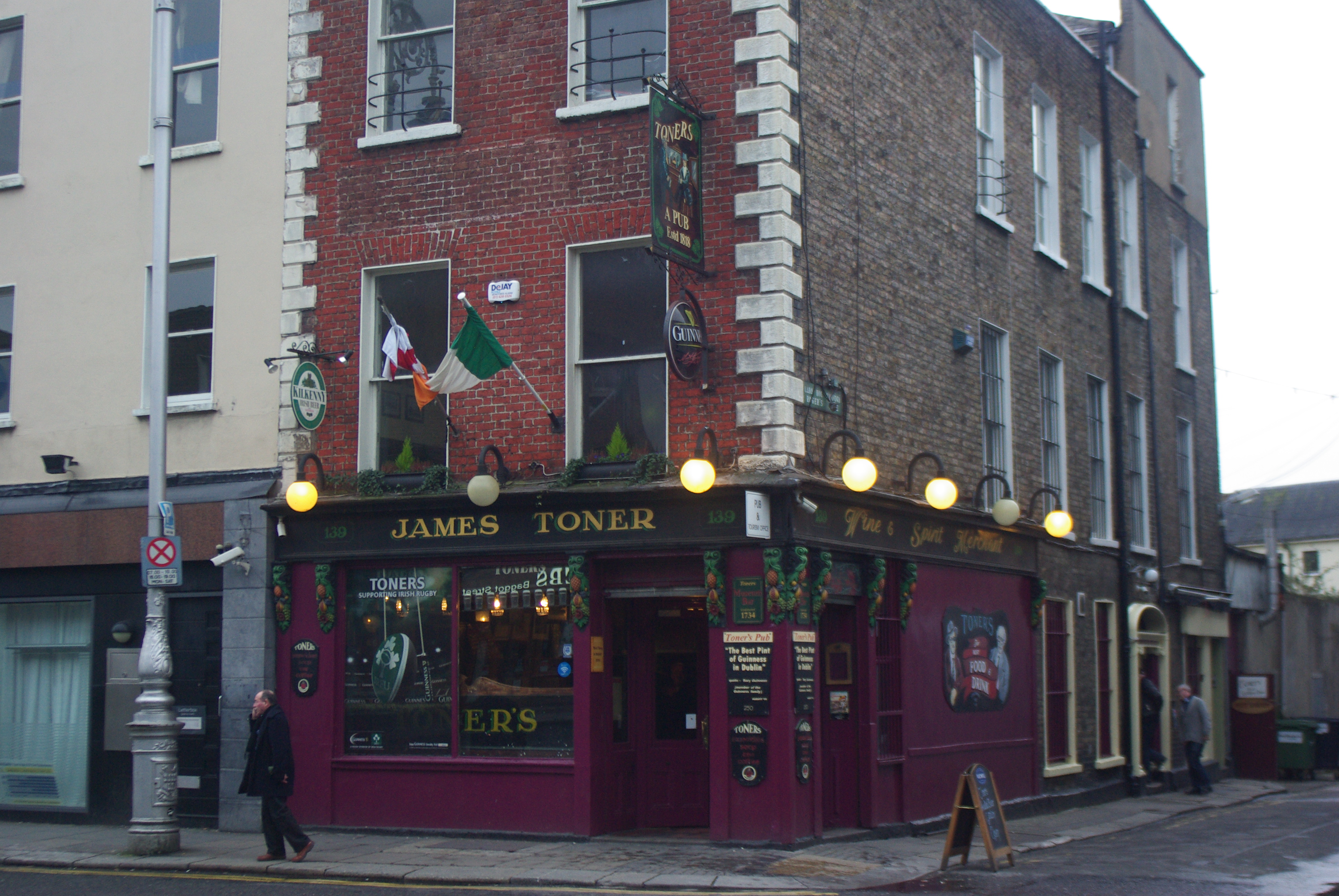
- Toner's pub in February 2013
- Interactive map of the Toner's Pub area

General information
- Type: 3 storey red brick
- Architectural style: Victorian
- Location: 139 Lower Baggot Street, Dublin 2 (corner of Roger's Lane), Dublin, Ireland
- Coordinates: 53.337758°N 6.252438°W
- Completed: c.1734 (original building)
- Owner: Mick Quinn and Frank Quinn (acquired in 1987)

Website
- www.tonerspub.ie

Toner's Pub or James Toner's Pub is a traditional Irish pub on Baggot Street in Dublin, Ireland. A pub has been in operation on the site since 1818 when the original license was purchased by Andrew Rogers and it has been known as Toner's since coming under the ownership of James Toner in 1921.

The pub has been known to be frequented by politicians and media figures owing to its proximity to the Dáil and Government buildings.

Toner's is situated on Lower Baggot Street in close proximity to other notable pubs and eateries including Doheny & Nesbitt and the Merrion Hotel/Restaurant Patrick Guilbaud.

The Quinn family owns the pub along with nearby pubs the Waterloo, the 51 bar on Haddington Road and the Lansdowne Hotel.

The pub was used as a filming location, by Sergio Leone, for the bar-related flashback scenes in Duck, You Sucker!.

== Gallery ==
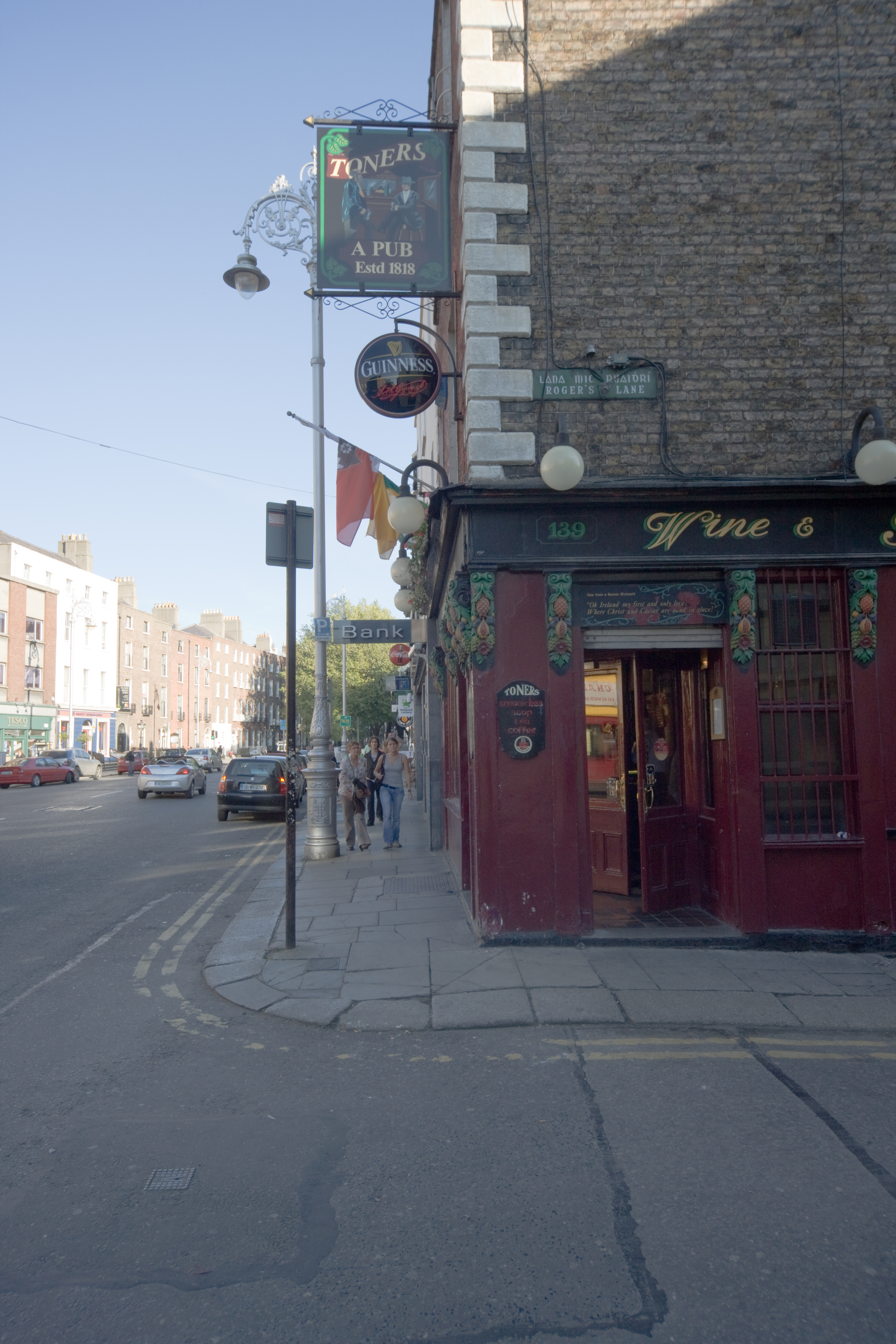
A view of Baggot Street and Toner's Pub in September 2008

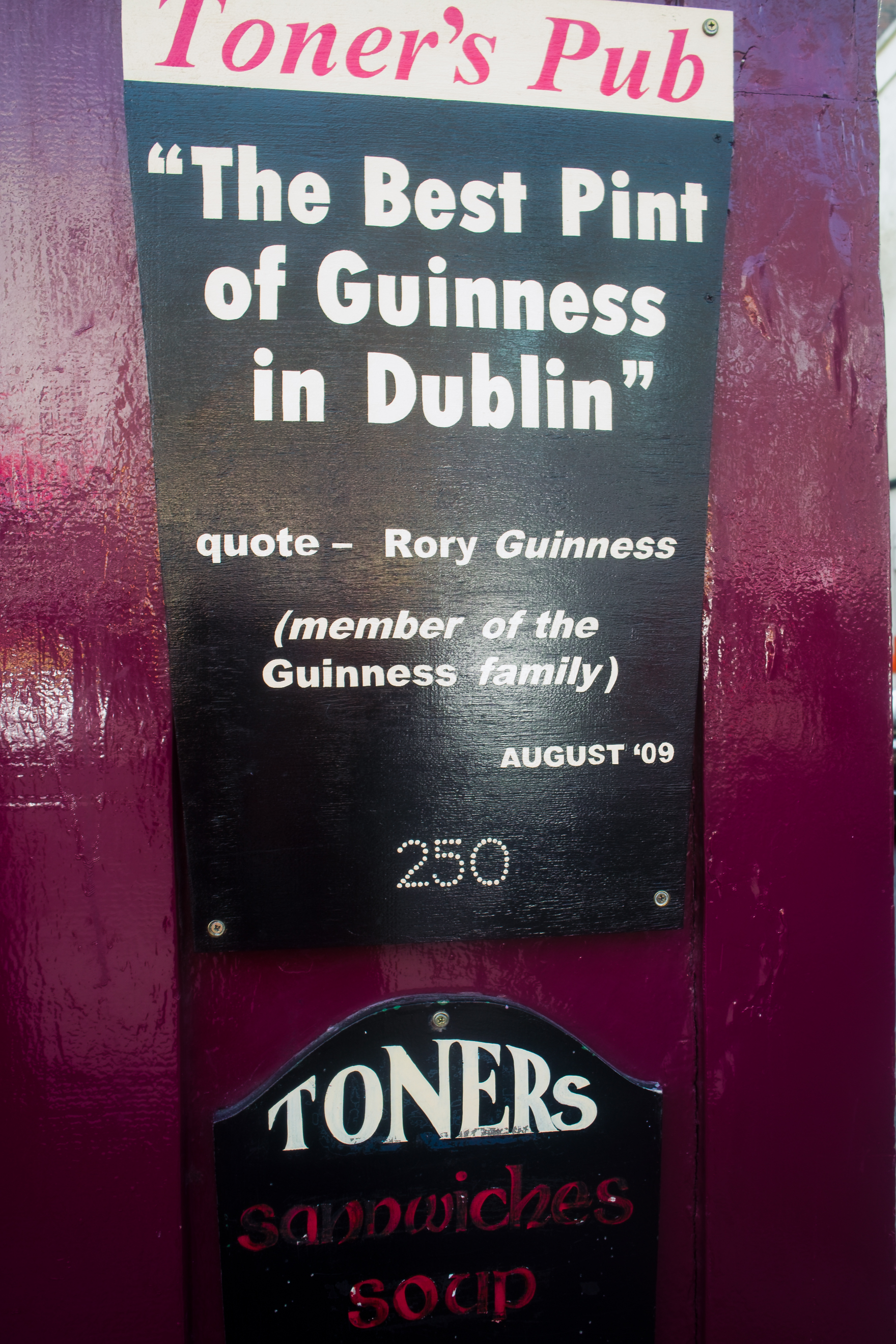
A sign on the outside wall of Toner's Pub in 2010

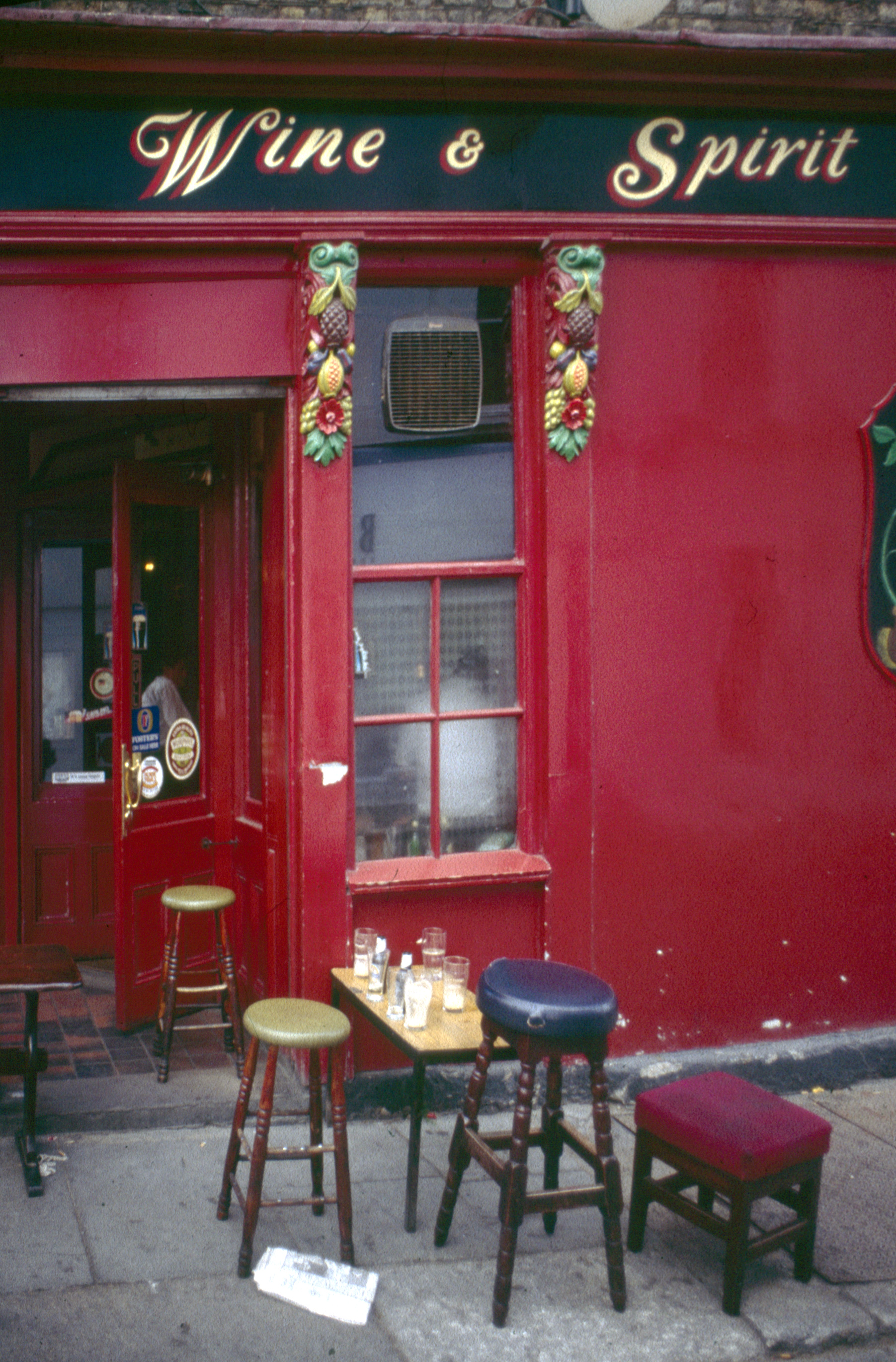
Toner's in 1989

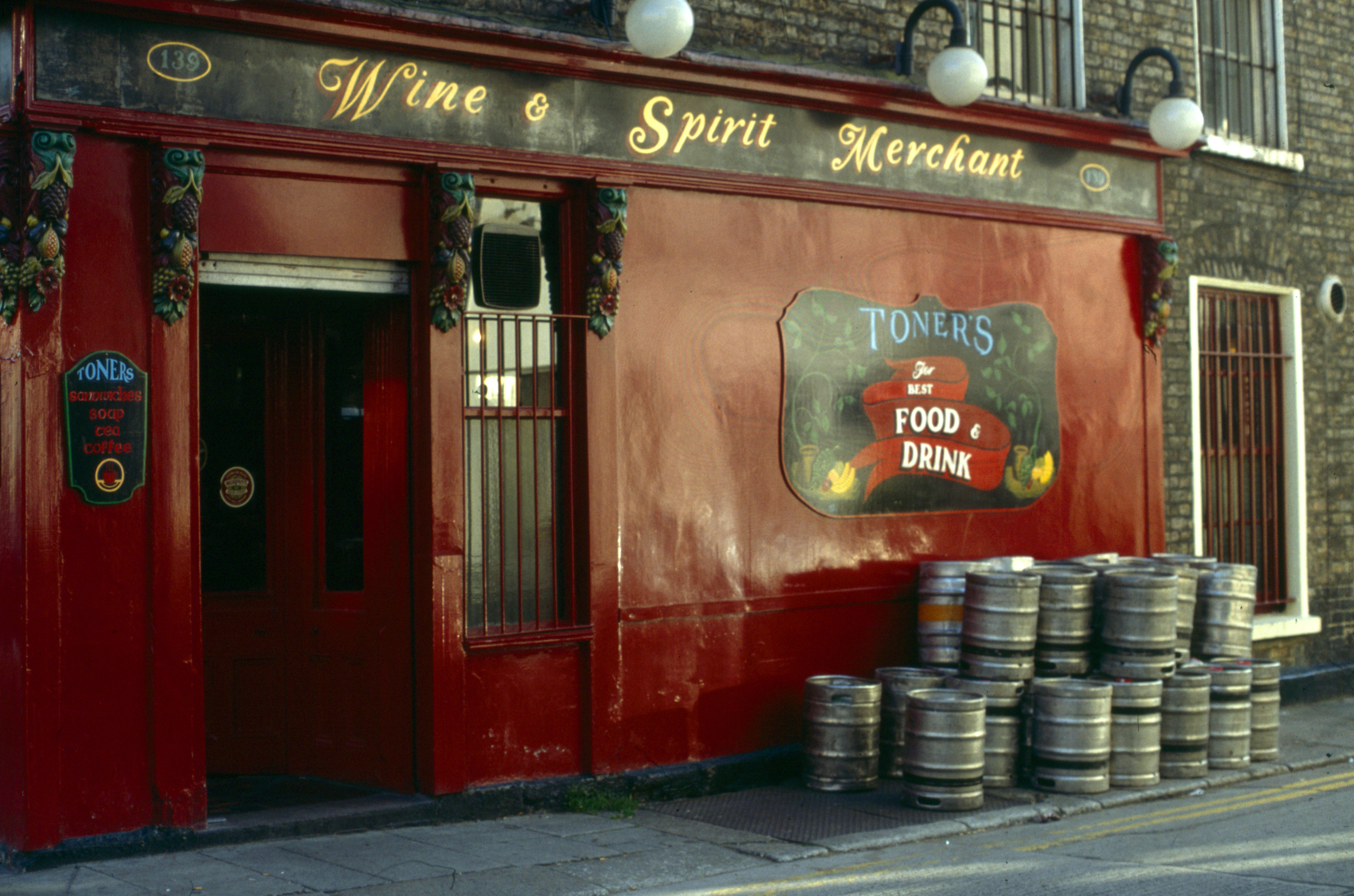
Kegs outside Toner's Pub in 1993

== See also ==
- List of pubs in Dublin
