= Duck, You Sucker! =

1971 Zapata Western film directed by Sergio Leone

- Italian theatrical release poster
- Directed by: Sergio Leone
- Screenplay by: Luciano Vincenzoni; Sergio Donati; Sergio Leone
- Dialogue by: Roberto de Leonardis; Carlo Tritto
- Story by: Sergio Leone; Sergio Donati
- Produced by: Fulvio Morsella
- Starring: Rod Steiger; James Coburn; Romolo Valli; Maria Monti; Rik Battaglia; Franco Graziosi
- Cinematography: Giuseppe Ruzzolini
- Edited by: Nino Baragli
- Music by: Ennio Morricone
- Production companies: Rafran Cinematografica; Euro International Films; San Miura; United Artists
- Distributed by: Euro International Films (Italy); United Artists (International)
- Release dates: 29 October 1971 (Italy); 7 July 1972 (USA)
- Running time: 157 minutes (Italian version); 154 minutes (standard version); 138 minutes (US theatrical version)
- Country: Italy; United States
- Languages: Italian; English
- Box office: ₤1.829 billion (Italy); 4,731,889 admissions (France)

Duck, You Sucker! (Italian: Giù la testa, lit. "Duck Your Head", "Get Down"), also known as A Fistful of Dynamite and Once Upon a Time ... the Revolution, is a 1971 epic Zapata Western film directed and co-written by Sergio Leone and starring Rod Steiger, James Coburn, and Romolo Valli.

Set during the Mexican Revolution of the 1910s, the film tells the story of Juan Miranda, a Mexican outlaw, and John Mallory, a former member of the Irish Republican Army (IRA) and Irish Volunteer Army. After they accidentally meet under less-than-friendly circumstances, Juan and John involuntarily become heroes of the revolution, despite being forced to make heavy sacrifices.

It is the second film of Leone's unofficial Once Upon a Time Trilogy, following Once Upon a Time in the West (1968) and preceding Once Upon a Time in America (1984). The last Western directed by Leone, some critics consider it among his most overlooked films.

== Plot ==
In revolution-torn 1913 Mexico, outlaw Juan Miranda leads a family of bandits, robs a coach of wealthy people, and rapes a female passenger who slandered Mexicans in front of him. Passing by on a motorcycle is John H. Mallory, an Irish Republican explosives expert, who works in Mexico as a silver prospector. Juan asks John (who initially states his name as "Seán") to help him rob the Mesa Verde National Bank. After John refuses, Juan frames him for the murder of his employer and several soldiers, making him a wanted criminal and offering to "protect" him in exchange for his help. John reluctantly agrees, but escapes on the way to Mesa Verde.

Arriving in the city before Juan, John makes contact with revolutionaries led by physician Dr. Villega and agrees to use his explosives in their service. When Juan arrives, John inducts him into the revolutionaries' ranks. The bank is hit as part of an orchestrated attack on the Mexican army. Juan, interested only in money, is shocked to find that the bank has no funds and is instead being used by the army as a political prison. After freeing several prisoners, Juan inadvertently becomes a "glorious hero of the revolution".

The revolutionaries are chased into the hills by an army detachment led by Colonel Gunther Ruiz. John and Juan volunteer to stay behind, armed with machine guns and dynamite. Much of the detachment is destroyed while crossing a bridge, which John explodes. Ruiz, however, survives. After the battle, John and Juan find most of their comrades, including Juan's father and children, have been killed by the army. Enraged, Juan decides to fight the army single-handed, and is captured. John sneaks into camp, where other revolutionaries are being executed by firing squad. They were informed on by Dr. Villega, who has been tortured by Ruiz and his men. This evokes in John memories of a similar betrayal by Nolan, his best friend in Ireland. Nolan identified John, who killed two British soldiers and then killed Nolan, making himself a fugitive and forcing him to flee Ireland. Juan is facing a firing squad when John saves him with dynamite.

After escaping on a motorcycle, John and Juan hide in the animal coach of a train. It stops to pick up the tyrannical Governor Don Jaime, who is fleeing (with a small fortune) from revolutionary forces. As the train is ambushed, John lets Juan choose between shooting Jaime or accepting a bribe from him. Juan kills Jaime, also stealing the governor's spoils. Juan and John decide to flee to America with the money, but as the door opens, Juan is greeted by the revolutionaries. The money is taken away by the revolutionaries, so Juan and John are forced to stay in Mexico.

On a train with commanders of the revolution, John and Juan are joined by Dr. Villega, who has escaped. John alone knows of Villega's betrayal. Pancho Villa's forces will be delayed by twenty-four hours, and a military train will arrive that evening carrying over a thousand soldiers and heavy weapons, led by Ruiz, which will surely overpower the rebel position. John suggests they rig a locomotive with dynamite and send it head-on. He requires one other man, but instead of picking Juan, who volunteers, he chooses Villega. Villega realizes that John knows of the betrayal, but does not judge him. John begs him to jump off the locomotive before it hits the army's train, but Villega feels guilty and stays on board. John jumps in time and the trains collide, killing Villega and many Mexican soldiers.

The revolutionaries' ambush is successful, but as John approaches to meet Juan, he is shot by Ruiz. Enraged, Juan kills Ruiz with a machine gun. As John lies dying, Juan kneels by his side to ask about Villega. John only says that Villega died a hero of the revolution. As Juan goes to seek help, John relives a memory of Nolan, and of a woman they both apparently loved, before letting off a second charge he secretly laid in case the battle went badly. Horrified, Juan later stares at John's burning remains and forlornly asks, "What about me?"

== Cast ==
- Rod Steiger as Juan Miranda, is a Mexican peon leading a band of outlaws composed mostly of his own children. He does not care about the revolution at first, but becomes involved after his encounter with John.
- James Coburn as John (Seán) H. Mallory, is a Fenian revolutionary and explosives expert. Wanted for killing British forces in Ireland, he flees to Mexico, where he ends up getting involved in another revolution.
- Romolo Valli as Dr. Villega, is a physician and commander of the revolutionary movement of Mesa Verde.
- Maria Monti as Adelita, is a wealthy female passenger on the stagecoach robbed and raped by Juan at the beginning of the film.
- Rik Battaglia as General Santerna, is a commander leading the Mexican revolutionary army.
- Franco Graziosi as Governor Don Jaime, is the corrupt and tyrannical local governor.
- Antoine Saint-John as Colonel Günther Ruiz, is a ruthless commander leading a detachment of federales and the main antagonist of the film.
- Vivienne Chandler as Coleen, is John's girlfriend; she appears only in flashbacks.
- David Warbeck as Nolan, is John's best friend, also an Irish nationalist; he appears only in flashbacks.

== Production ==
=== Development ===
The development of Duck, You Sucker! began during the production of Once Upon a Time in the West, when Sergio Leone's collaborator Sergio Donati presented him with an early treatment of the film. Around the same time, political riots had broken out in Paris, and the ideals of revolution and left-wing nationalism had become popular among university students and filmmakers across Europe. Leone, who had used his previous films to deconstruct the romanticization of the American Old West, decided to use Duck, You Sucker! to deconstruct the romanticized nature of revolution, and to shed light on the political instability of contemporary Italy.

Leone, Donati, and Luciano Vincenzoni worked together on the film's screenplay for three to four weeks, discussing characters and scenes for the film. Donati, who had previously acted as an uncredited script doctor for The Good, the Bad and the Ugly, conceived Juan Miranda's character as an extension of Tuco from The Good, the Bad, and the Ugly. Meanwhile, Leone was largely responsible for the character of John Mallory, and the film's focus on the development of John and Juan's friendship. At times, however, Leone, Donati, and Vincenzoni found that they had highly differing opinions about how the film should be made, with Leone wanting to have the film produced on a large scale with an epic quality, while Donati and Vincenzoni perceived the film as a low-budget thriller.

Leone never intended to direct Duck, You Sucker!, and wanted the film to be directed by someone who could replicate his visual style. Peter Bogdanovich, his original choice for director, soon abandoned the film due to perceived lack of control. Sam Peckinpah then agreed to direct the film after Bogdanovich's departure, only to be turned down for financial reasons by United Artists. Donati and Vincenzoni, noting the director's frequent embellishment of the facts concerning his films, claim that Peckinpah did not even consider it - Donati stated that Peckinpah was "too shrewd to be produced by a fellow director". Leone then recruited his regular assistant director, Giancarlo Santi, to direct, with Leone supervising proceedings, and Santi was in charge for the first 10 days of shooting. However, Rod Steiger refused to play his role as Juan unless Leone himself directed, and the producers pressured him into directing the film. Leone reluctantly agreed, and Santi was relegated to second unit work.

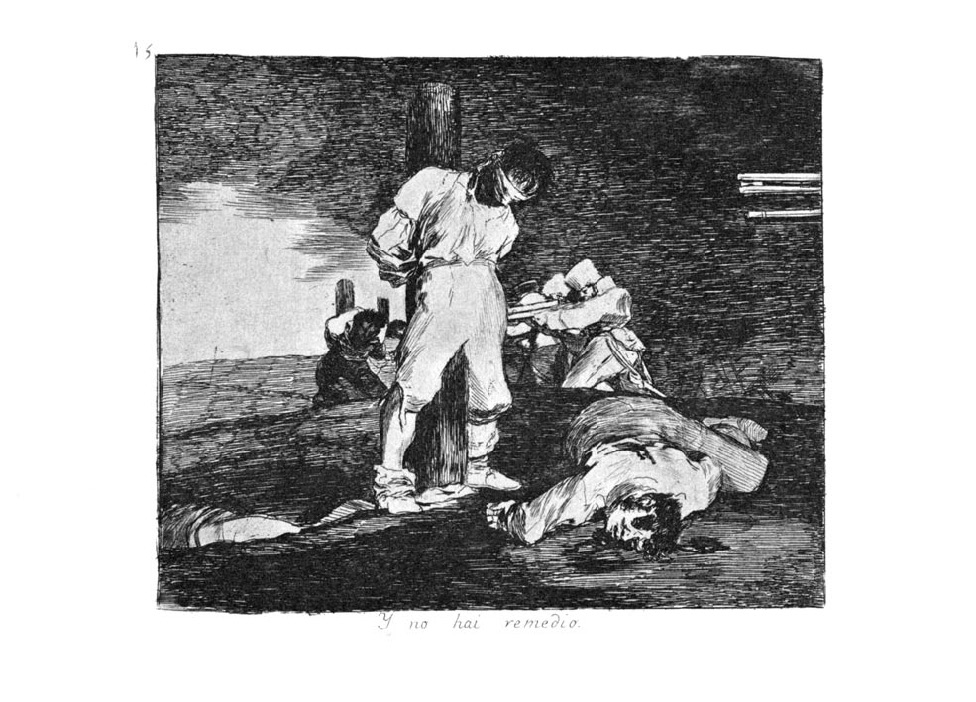
Goya's work inspired Giuseppe Ruzzolini's cinematography for the execution scene.

The inspiration for the firing-squad scene came from Francisco Goya, and in particular from his set of prints The Disasters of War. Leone showed the prints to director of photography Giuseppe Ruzzolini to get the lighting and color effects he wanted. The film is believed to have been influenced by Peckinpah's The Wild Bunch, and it shares some plot elements with Pat Garrett and Billy the Kid, a Western film also starring Coburn and released a year later. Leone biographer and film historian Sir Christopher Frayling noted that Duck, You Sucker! was made in a period of Italian cinema where filmmakers were "rethinking" their relationship with fascism and the Nazi occupation of Rome. He has identified numerous references to both world wars in the film, such as Colonel Reza's commanding of an armored car resembling a Nazi tank commander, the massacre of Juan's family (which bears similarities to the Ardeatine massacre of 1944), and an execution victim resembling Benito Mussolini.

=== Casting ===
Casting the lead roles of Duck, You Sucker! proved to be a difficult process. The role of John Mallory was written for Jason Robards, who had played Cheyenne in Once Upon a Time in the West, but the studio wanted a bigger name for his character. Clint Eastwood was then approached by Leone for the role, but he saw it as just a different take of the same character he had already played in the Dollars Trilogy, and he also wanted to end his association with the Italian film industry. As a result, he declined the offer and starred in Hang 'Em High, instead. George Lazenby was then approached to play John, but he declined. A young Malcolm McDowell, then mostly known for his performance in if...., was considered for both John and Nolan, John's Irish friend, but Leone eventually settled on James Coburn to play John. Coburn had previously been considered for other Leone projects, including A Fistful of Dollars and Once Upon a Time in the West. He had also previously been considered for a role in another United Artists-financed Zapata Western, Sergio Corbucci's The Mercenary, but Franco Nero was later cast in what was originally his role.

The role of Juan Miranda was written for Eli Wallach, based on his performance as Tuco in The Good, the Bad, and the Ugly, but Wallach had already committed to another project with Jean-Paul Belmondo. After Leone begged Wallach to play the part, he dropped out of the other project to play Juan. Rod Steiger owed the studio another film, though, and they refused to back the picture unless Steiger was used. Leone offered no compensation to Wallach, and Wallach subsequently sued.

Leone was initially dissatisfied with Steiger's performance in that he played his character as a serious, Zapata-like figure. As a result, tensions rose between Steiger and Leone numerous times, including an incident that ended with Steiger walking off during the filming of the scene when John destroys Juan's stagecoach. After the film's completion, Leone and Steiger were content with the final result, and Steiger was known to praise Leone for his skills as a director.

=== Filming ===
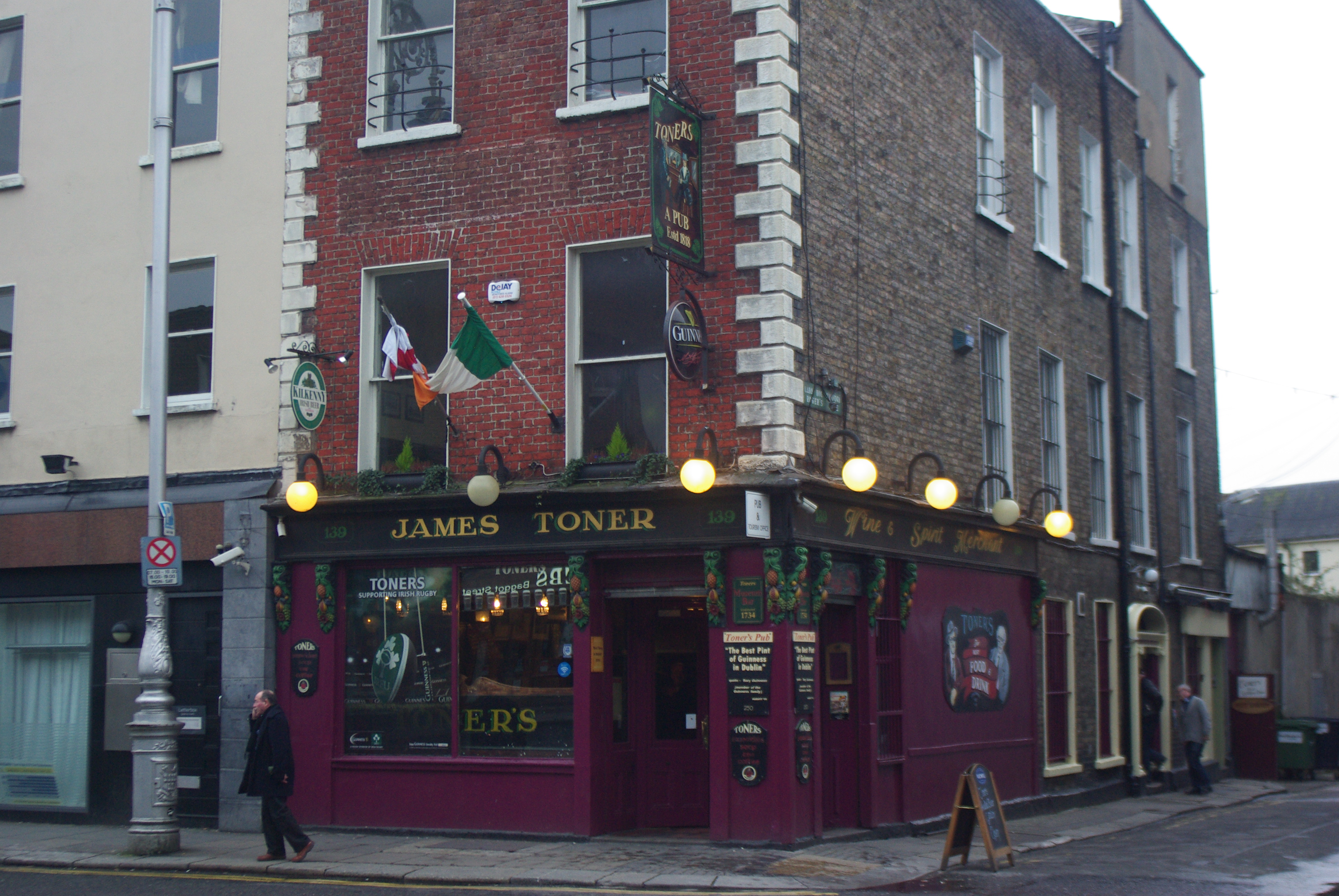
Toner's Pub, Dublin

Exterior filming mostly took place in Andalusia, southern Spain. Some of the locations used previously featured in Leone's Dollar Trilogy films; for example, the Almería Railway Station, used for the train sequence in For a Few Dollars More, returns in this film as Mesa Verde's station. The flashback scenes with Sean and friends were shot in Ireland at Howth Castle in Dublin and Toner's Pub on Baggot Street, Dublin. As filming progressed, Leone modified the script; as he did not originally plan on directing Duck, You Sucker, he thought the script was "conceived for an American filmmaker". Duck, You Sucker! was one of the last mainstream films shot in Techniscope.

Antonio Margheriti claims to have done the miniature work on the film, particularly the train sequences. Alberto De Martino filmed second unit of the final battle.

=== Music ===
The musical score for Duck, You Sucker! was composed by Ennio Morricone, who collaborated with Leone in all his previous projects as a director with the exception of his debut, The Colossus of Rhodes. Elvis Mitchell, former film critic for The New York Times, considered it as one of Morricone's "most glorious and unforgettable scores". He also sees "Invention for John", which plays over the opening credits and is essentially the film's theme, "as epic and truly wondrous as anything Morricone ever did". A soundtrack album was released in the United States in 1972, and many tracks can be found in Morricone's compilation albums. Music was recorded in April 1971 and second recording sessions in August/September the same year. A 35th-anniversary OST was issued in 2006 with previously unreleased alternate takes.

== Themes ==
Despite the politically charged setting, Duck, You Sucker! was not intended as a political film; Leone himself said that the Mexican Revolution in the film is meant only as a symbol, not as a representation of the real one, and that it was chosen because of its fame and its relationship with cinema, and he contends that the real theme of the film is friendship:

I chose to oppose an intellectual, who has experienced a revolution in Ireland, with a naïve Mexican... you have two men: one naïve and one intellectual (self-centred as intellectuals too often are in the face of the naïve). From there, the film becomes the story of Pygmalion reversed. The simple one teaches the intellectual a lesson. Nature gains an upper hand and finally the intellectual throws away his book of Bakunin's writings. You suspect damn well that this gesture is a symbolic reference to everything my generation has been told in the way of promises. We have waited, but we still are waiting! I have the film say, in effect "Revolution means confusion".

Another theme is disillusioned non-engagement: Juan is very loyal to his family (consisting of his six children, each from a different mother) and has learned not to place his trust in anyone else. He is also very cynical about priests and disregards codified law. By practicing non-engagement, he deliberately refrains from taking part in battles where the grounds of engagement are defined by others, especially his adversaries. Just because someone is determined to fight, to play the role of a noble liberator or a victim, does not mean he has to participate.

The film also explores the relationship between Mexican bandits and peasant communities at the time of the revolution, idealized by figures including Juan José Herrera and Elfego Baca, whom Leone may have had in mind in his creation of the character of Juan.

== Release and reaction ==
=== Performance ===
The film was moderately successful in Italy, where it grossed 1,829,402,000 lire on its first run; it was the third-highest grossing spaghetti Western at the Italian box office that year, behind Trinity is Still My Name (which overtook For a Few Dollars More as the highest-grossing film ever released in Italy at that time) and Red Sun. Although it was the lowest-grossing of Leone's five Westerns in Italy by a notable margin, it was also the highest-grossing Zapata Western released there. In France, it was the fourth-most popular film released there in 1972, behind A Clockwork Orange, Stadium Nuts, and Last Tango in Paris.

=== Reception ===
Duck, You Sucker! failed to gain any substantial recognition from the critics at the time of debut, especially compared to Leone's other films, though he did win the David di Donatello for Best Director. Since then, however, it has received a more favorable reception; on review aggregator Rotten Tomatoes, the film holds an approval rating of 92% based on 26 reviews, with an average rating of 7.40/10. The website's critical consensus reads, "Duck, You Sucker is a saucy helping of spaghetti Western, with James Coburn and Rod Steiger's chemistry igniting the screen and Sergio Leone's bravura style on full display". Metacritic, which uses a weighted average, assigned the film a score of 77 out of 100, based on 5 critics, indicating "generally favorable" reviews.

The Chicago Reader praised it for its "marvelous sense of detail and spectacular effects". The New York Observer argues that Leone's direction, Morricone's score, and the leads' performances "ignite an emotional explosion comparable to that of Once Upon a Time in the West". In Mexico, where the film is known as Los Héroes de Mesa Verde, it was refused classification and effectively banned until 1979, because it was considered offensive to the Mexican people and the revolution. Leslie Halliwell wrote: "Overblown action spectacular, far too long to be sustained by its flashes of humour and excitement ... " Leonard Maltin gave it three of four stars: "Big, sprawling story of Mexican revolution ... Tremendous action sequences; Leone's wry touches and ultra-weird Ennio Morricone score make it worthwhile diversion."

=== Release history ===
The film was originally released in the United States in 1972 as Duck, You Sucker!, and ran for 121 minutes. Many scenes were cut because they were deemed too violent, profane, or politically sensitive, including a quote from Mao Zedong about the nature of revolutions and class struggle. Theatrical prints were generally of poor quality, and the film was marketed as a light-hearted spiritual successor to the Dollars Trilogy, not at all as Leone intended, and it did not succeed in gaining press notice. In part because of this, United Artists reissued the film under the new name of A Fistful of Dynamite, meant to recall the notoriety of A Fistful of Dollars. According to Peter Bogdanovich, the original title Duck, You Sucker! was meant by Leone as a close translation of the Italian title Giù la testa, coglione! (translated: "Duck your head, dumbass!"), which he contended to be a common American colloquialism. The expletive coglione (a vulgar way to say "testicle") was later removed to avoid censorship issues. One of the working titles, Once Upon a Time... the Revolution, was also used for some European releases.

In 1989, Image Entertainment released the film on laserdisc, including some material cut from the original US version and lasting 138 minutes. This version was released in Europe as Once Upon a Time in Mexico, again intended to evoke an earlier Leone film, Once Upon a Time in the West.

Subsequent re-releases have largely used the title A Fistful of Dynamite, although the DVD appearing in The Sergio Leone Anthology box set, released by MGM in 2007, used the original English language title of Duck, You Sucker!.

The film's first English-language DVD was released by MGM in the UK in 2003. This version of the film runs 154 minutes and is almost complete, but it uses a truncated version of the film's final four-minute-long flashback. In 2005, following the restoration of Leone's The Good, the Bad and the Ugly, MGM re-released the film in the UK with more supplemental material, the aforementioned flashback scene reinstated, and with a newly created 5.1 surround soundtrack. The restored version had a brief art house theatrical run in the U.S., and was subsequently released there in a "Collector's Edition" in 2007. The remastered surround tracks have attracted criticism online for the replacement of certain music cues throughout the film (most prominently during the last two flashback scenes and the end credits) and for censoring at least two expletives from the film's soundtrack. Furthermore, the mono soundtrack reportedly included on the 2007 Collector's Edition is not the original mix, but simply a fold-down of the surround remaster.

Duck, You Sucker! was shown in 2009 as part of the Cannes Classics series of the 62nd Cannes Film Festival. The print used for the festival was restored by the Cineteca di Bologna and the film laboratory Immagine Ritrovata.

In October 2014, MGM released the film on Blu-ray, akin to its Blu-ray releases of the Dollars Trilogy.
