= Franco Graziosi =

Italian actor (1929–2021)

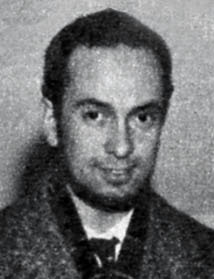
- Graziosi in 1957
- Born: 10 July 1929; Macerata, Italy
- Died: September 8, 2021 (aged 92); Rome, Italy
- Occupation: Actor

Franco Graziosi (10 July 1929 – 8 September 2021) was an Italian actor. Entering films in 1960, he made some 28 motion picture and television appearances between then and 2013. He appeared regularly in television mini-series throughout his career. In 1971, he appeared in Sergio Leone's Duck, You Sucker!.

== Filmography ==
Year	Title	Role	Notes
1961	The Corsican Brothers	Domenico	
1963	The Terrorist	Quadro Aldrigui	
1969	Sierra Maestra		
1970	Quel maledetto giorno d'inverno... Django e Sartana all'ultimo sangue		
1970	Many Wars Ago	Major Ruggero Malchiodi	
1971	Duck, You Sucker!	Governor Huerta	
1972	The Mattei Affair	Minister	
1973	Los Amigos	Gen. Lucius Morton	
1976	Al piacere di rivederla	Pietro Bonfigli	
1977	Antonio Gramsci: The Days of Prison	Manuilsky	
2011	We Have a Pope	Cardinal Bollati	
2013	The Great Beauty	Count Colonna	(final film role)
