= Egisto Macchi =

Italian composer

- Born: 4 August 1928; Grosseto, Kingdom of Italy
- Died: 8 August 1992 (aged 64) Montpellier, France
- Genres: library music
- Occupations: Composer, orchestrator, music director, conductor, violinist, pianist
- Years active: 1953–1992

Egisto Macchi (4 August 1928 – 8 August 1992) was an Italian composer.

== Biography ==
Born in Grosseto, Macchi moved to Rome to study composition, piano, violin and singing with Roman Vlad (1946–51) and Hermann Scherchen (1949–54), among others. It was around this period that he also studied literature and human physiology at La Sapienza University.

From the late fifties, he began his collaboration with a group of musicians (Franco Evangelisti, Domenico Guaccero and Daniele Paris), to whom he was bound by intense friendship. Together with Domenico Guaccero, Daniele Paris and Antonino Titone, he was one of the editors of the magazine Orders, which first appeared in 1959. With Bertoncini, Bortolotti, Clementi, De Blasio, Evangelisti, Guaccero, Paris, Pennisi, and Franco Norris, he founded the Association of New Consonance in 1960. He made a frequent hand at directing the association, and he held the office of President from 1980 to 1982, and also in 1989.

From the day of its conception, he followed the activity of the International Week of New Music in Palermo. After creating the Musical Theatre of Rome with Guaccero, he founded Studio R7, an experimental, electronic music laboratory born in 1967. It is in the same year that he joined Franco Evangelisti's Gruppo di Improvvisazione di Nuova Consonanza, an avant garde improvisation group that also recruited Macchi's close friend and collaborator Ennio Morricone.

In 1978, he was part of the Italian commission for the music of UNICEF, together with Luis Bacalov, Franco Evangelisti, Ennio Morricone and Nino Rota.

In 1983, he created, together with Guaccero, the Institute of Voice, seeking to deal with problems related to vocal work in the field of classical music and folk music of all continents. The institute made use of new technologies in the field of electronics and cybernetics. He took over the direction of the institute after the death of his friend in 1984.

Further initiatives followed. In 1984 he became one of the founders of I.R.T.E.M (Institute of Research for Musical Theatre), together with Paola Bernardi, Carlo Marinelli and Ennio Morricone. In this context he also founded the Sound Archive for Contemporary Music, of which he was the director until his death. It is with the Sound Archive that he created a series of conferences, meetings and seminars for the knowledge and diffusion of contemporary music.

In his last years, he had been working with Ennio Morricone to promote the 'New Opera'. In November 1991 he completed La Bohème, a transcription for sixteen instruments and four synthesizers, and Morricone similarly adapted Tosca. Both works were ready to be staged when Macchi died in 1992.

== Style ==
Macchi described his music as Dionysian and he credited this to a profound period of loss and despair: "[I experienced a] time of loss... But it was only a moment, though that lasted almost a year: a moment of silence and despair. Today I found the strength to walk" (to Titone on December 23, 1957: Titone 1980, 161). Such a feeling of rebirth is evident in the earlier work Composizione (1958) for chamber orchestra in which sounds flow from silence in the frame of a "process narrative" (Titone 1980, 43).

The composer later tried his hand at serialism in Composizione no. 2, however this was an isolated attempt and Macchi soon moved on to adapt newer techniques, reassessing the formal stability that characterized his earlier works (Annibaldi 2001; Grove & Macmillan). There began a more functional use of more challenging devices, such as aleatory writing in Composizione no. 3 and the transformation of the orchestra into a chorus in Composizione no. 5 (Annibaldi 2001; Grove & Macmillan).

From 1967, Macchi became absorbed in work for television and film. His typical mixtures of media and styles displayed a kind of applied experimentalism in which he reconciled the most ingenious sound research with the greatest evocative immediacy; he maintained the same kind of organisational rigour and expressiveness that was to be found in his concert music (Grove & Macmillan).

His film work included the scores to Bandidos (1967), Gangsters '70 (1968), The Assassination of Trotsky (1972), Black Holiday (1973), Mr. Klein (1976), Padre Padrone (1977), Antonio Gramsci: The Days of Prison (1977), Charlotte (1981), Menuet (1982), The Malady of Love (1986), Salome (1986), and Havinck (1987). More recently, his compositions Modulo Lunare and Forme Planetarie featured on the soundtrack of Ashim Ahluwalia's 2012 film, Miss Lovely.

== Compositions ==
1953

Tre evocazioni in memoria, for orchestra. Premiere: Rome, RAI Orchestra, 1954, dir. Ferruccio Scaglia.

1954

Due pezzi for string quartet.

1955

Micropolittico, for clarinet, trumpet, horn, bass and percussion.

1956

Quattro espressioni, for chamber orchestra. First performance: Milan, Conservatory, 1957. Dir. Piero Santi.

1958

Due variazioni for chamber orchestra. Premiere: Naples, Scarlatti Orchestra, 1959. Dir. Max Pradella.

Composizione for chamber orchestra. Premiere: Naples, Scarlatti Orchestra, 1960. Dir. Daniele Paris.

Il mestiere della pace, two poems for baritone and piano.

1959

Schemi, for two violins, two pianos and saxophone. Premiere: Florence Conservatory, 1960.

1960

Composizione 3 (Studio per dodici strumenti). First performance: Palermo, The International Week of New Music, 1960. Dir. Andrzej Markowski.

1961

Composizione 4 (Coplas de otras tardes), for nine tools. Premiere: Rome, Festival of New Consonance, Arts Theatre, 1961. Dir. Daniele Paris.

Composizione 5 (No han muerto!), for orchestra. First performance: Palermo, Ila International Week New Music.

1962

Anno Domini, a theatre composition for orchestra and chorus, from text of Antonino Titone. First performance: Palermo Orchestra conducted by Paris, Teatro Biondo, 1965. Opera runner at the International ISCM 1962.

1963

Parabola, a composition for theatre (unfinished). Based on a text by Antonino Titone.

1964

Morte all'orecchio di Van Gogh, for voice acting, harpsichord, magnetic tape and chamber orchestra. First performance: Milan, Musical Afternoons, Opera House, 1964. Dir. Daniele Paris.

1965

Per cembalo (clavicembalo solo). Premiere: Rome, Festival of New Consonance, Arts Theatre, 1965.

1966

Alteraction, composition for theatres in two parts, based on texts by Antonin Artaud and Deacon Mario. Premiere: Rome, Teatro Olimpico, 1966, the Musical Theatre Company.

1968

Composizione 6 (Piccolo requiem per Dachau), for children's choir. Premiere: Rome, New Consonance, 1981, Aureliano Choir. Dir. Brunette Liguori Valenti.

Composizione 7, for double quartet and chamber orchestra. First performance: Milan, Teatro Lirico, 1968.

1980

O Vos Omnes, for female chorus and/or voices, for eight voices. Premiere: Rome, New Consonance, 1984, Aureliano Female Choir. Dir. Brunette Liguori Valenti.

1985

Venere e il Leone, opera in one act to a libretto by Nicola Badalucco, for soprano and piano. First run Pergine, Trent, 1986.

Lontano come uno specchio, for male choir and orchestra.

Ma già dall'orizzonte accenni addio, for soprano, piano, double quartet and chamber orchestra. Intended for the Teatro La Fenice in Venice in the Cloister of San Niccolo at Lido sung by Maria Alide Salvetta .

1986

Venere e il Leone, one-act opera on a libretto by Nicola Badalucco, version for soprano, piano and 14 instruments.

Sura per García, for soprano and string quartet. First performance: Cagliari, Festival Spaziomusica, 1986.

Canzoni Italiane degli anni '20 e '40, scelte e rivisitate da Egisto Macchi, for soprano and piano. First performance: Palermo, Friends of Music, Theatre Blonde, 1987.

Dies Irae, for children's choir and/or female and fireworks. Premiere: Rome, Music Festival, Villa Medici, Aureliano Female Choir. Dir. Brunette Liguori Valenti.

1987

A Matra, a chamber opera in one act to a libretto by Nicola Badalucco, for female voice and piano.

Passi e Voci, choirs and 2 suites for 8 synthesizers. Premiere: Rome, Sports Hall, 1987.

1988

Bolero, for 11 strings. First performance: Makes, IV Music Festival today, 1988, Music Group today, dir. Vittorio Bonolis.

Bolero, version for 19 strings.

È vicina l'ora: s'è spaccata la luna, for female choir and string quartet. Premiere: Rome, Research Group and musical experimentation, S. Michele, Living the Drying, 1988, Aureliano Female Choir. Dir. Brunette Liguori Valenti.

Repliche di Bruna, for soprano and piano. Premiere: Rome, XXV Festival of New Consonance, Gallery of Modern Art, 1988.

Quando l'ora verrà, for male chorus.

Quando l'ora verrà, version for female chorus.

Apocalypsis Altera, for children's choir, keyboard, gong, 2 voices, 3 trumpets, 3 horns, 3 trombones and 3 tuba.

1989

Luoghi della luce, for mixed choir for 8 voices and 2 male choirs.

1990

Canzoni Italiane degli anni '20 e '40, scelte e rivisitate da Egisto Macchi, version for chorus and orchestra (4 songs). Premiere: Rome, Musical Events '900, Auditorium of the Foro Italico, 1990, RAI Orchestra. Dir. Antonio Ballista.

Qui me tradit, for mixed chorus a cappella.

E io?, for soprano and piano. World premiere: Amelia, Festival Ameroe, 1991. Lazotti Barbara, soprano; Carlo Negroni, piano.

1991

La Bohème, by Giuseppe Giacosa and Luigi Illica, music by Giacomo Puccini, reworked by Egisto Macchi for 16 instruments and 4 synthesizers (with sound archive league).

Una Via Crucis, sacred representation of texts by Sergio Miceli. Music by Michael Dall, Egisto Macchi, Ennio Morricone, Antonio Poce. Egisto Macchi: Intermezzo instrumental, VII and XIV station, for soprano, mezzo soprano, tenor, baritone, bass, mixed choir and chamber orchestra. First performance: Ferentino, Church St. Maria Maggiore, 1991. Lazotti Barbara, soprano Daniela Gentile, mezzo-soprano; Carlo Di Giacomo, tenor, Roberto Abbondanca, low. Ex Novo Ensemble. Dir. Claudio Ambrosini.

Ma l'amore no..., Italian songs of the '20s and 30s, transcribed for voice and piano. World premiere: Rome, Sala d'Ercole Palace of the Conservatives in the Capitol, December 29, 1992 for the Voice Institute. Elizabeth Norberg-Schulz and Barbara Lazotti Sopranos. Luca Salvadori, piano.

== Discography ==
Macchi's concert music was never recorded officially, although it is still performed and celebrated in Italy. However, thanks to the composer's prolific output in the world of film and library music (over 1000 television shows and 20 films scored), some of his soundtrack music is available on LP and CD, albeit rather hard to find.

=== Library music ===
Many collectors seek out Macchi's library music as it is distinct from most other soundtrack music and bears all the hallmarks of his dark and playful avant garde style. The exact number of these recordings is unknown; however, below is a select list:

- 1972 I Futuribili (also released as Futurissimo on St Germain Des Prés), LP Gemelli
- 1972 Città Notte, LP Sermi
- 1972 Fauna Marina, LP Leonardi
- 1975 Andes, LP Globevision
- 1975 Voix, LP Gemelli
- 1975 Sei Composizioni, LP Gemelli
- 1975 Contemporanea, LP Gemelli
- 1979 Bioritmi, LP Gemelli; reissued, Roma 106LP, 2015
- 197? Neuro Tensivo, LP Gemelli
- 2021 The Complete AYNA Sessions 72-76, CD box set, Cinedelic

=== Film music ===
- 1967 Bandidos, (LP, Cometa Edizioni Musicali 1979)
- 1967 La via del petrolio, directed by Bernardo Bertolucci
- 1972 The Assassination of Trotsky (CD, Beat Records 2011)
- 1975 Mr. Klein (LP, EMI 1976)
- 1977 Padre Padrone (LP, Feeling Record Italiana 1977; reissue RCA 1979)
- 1978 Antonio Gramsci – The Days of Prison (LP, Feeling Record Italiana 1978)
- 1986 Salomé (LP, CAM 1986)
- 1986 La Coda Del Diavolo (LP, CAM 1987)

== Sources ==
- Annibaldi, Claudio. 2001. "Macchi, Egisto". The New Grove Dictionary of Music and Musicians, second edition, edited by Stanley Sadie and John Tyrrell. London: Macmillan Publishers.
- Archive. Music of the Twentieth Century. Monograph on Egisto Macchi, edited by CIMS Music-Center for Initiatives in Sicily. Palermo:, 1996.
- Macchi, Claudio Annibaldi. The New Grove Dictionary of Music and Musicians, edited by Stanley Sadie. London: Macmillan Publishers, 1980.
- Titone, Antonino. 1980..
- Tortora, Daniela. 1990. Nuova Consonanza: Trent'anni Di Musica Contemporanea in Italia, 1959–1988. Musicalia 2. Lucca: Libreria Musicale Italiana. ISBN 9788870960198.
