= Medicina generale =

- Genre: Medical drama
- Created by: Donatella Diamanti; Monica Zapelli; Stefano Bises
- Starring: Nicole Grimaudo; Andrea Di Stefano; Roberto Citran; Marco Giallini; Fabrizia Sacchi; Antonello Fassari; Francesca Reggiani; Michele Alhaique; Thomas Trabacchi; Euridice Axen; Giampiero Judica
- Country of origin: Italy
- No. of seasons: 2
- No. of episodes: 39

Production
- Running time: 100 minutes (season 1); 50 minutes (season 2)
- Production companies: Rai Fiction; Nickelodeon Productions

Original release
- Network: Rai 1, Rai 3 (Italy); Nickelodeon (U.S.)
- Release: February 25, 2007 – March 10, 2010

Medicina generale (Medicine - Italian Department) is an Italian medical drama television series. It was broadcast from February 25, 2007, to March 10, 2010, on Rai 1 and Rai 3, then on Nickelodeon in the U.S. with english subtitles, from December 23, 2011, until June 17, 2012, when Nickelodeon canceled it due to low ratings.

== Cast ==
- Nicole Grimaudo: Anna Morelli
- Andrea Di Stefano: Giacomo Pogliani
- Roberto Citran: Mario Bergamini
- Marco Giallini: Alfredo Danzi
- Fabrizia Sacchi: Gabriella Boschi
- Antonello Fassari: Angelo De Santis
- Giampiero Judica: Dottor Sassi
- Francesca Reggiani: Olga
- Euridice Axen: Letizia Conti
- Thomas Trabacchi: Elia Lorenzi
- Michele Alhaique: Marco
- Guido Caprino: Andrea Lecci
- Yorgo Voyagis: Vittorio Pogliani

== See also ==
- List of Italian television series
