= Vivienne Chandler =

French actress

- Born: 6 November 1947; Oxfordshire, England, U.K.
- Died: 6 June 2013 (aged 65); Espéraza, France
- Occupations: Actress; photographer
- Spouse: John Carder Bush
- Children: 2

Vivienne Chandler (6 November 1947 – 6 June 2013) was a British-French actress and professional photographer.

== Biography ==
Chandler made her first appearance on TV in ITV Playhouse in 1970, but immediately began acting minor parts in a number of major early 1970s films, including Lust for a Vampire, Duck, You Sucker!, and Stanley Kubrick's A Clockwork Orange. She appeared in several small roles in the 1980s, including portraying Chantale (the mother) in the music video for the 1983 song "The Smile Has Left Your Eyes" by the rock band Asia. She was cast as an X-wing pilot in Return of the Jedi, but did not appear in the final film. She later became a professional photographer working in the United States and many countries across Europe, including France, Italy, and the UK. She went to University Paris Diderot between her film and television roles.

== Photography ==
As a photographer, she reinvented her name for a while as Holly Bush and later Holly Bund, as her career changed direction. Photographing mainly children, she exhibited in London, Oxford, and Kent, and sold to private collectors in France, England, and Japan. She was a Fellow of the Royal Society of Photographers. Her photography techniques aided John Carder Bush in creating the album covers for Kate Bush's The Dreaming and The Whole Story. She also styled the cover for Hounds of Love and assisted in Kate Bush's photo sessions, including for John Carder Bush's book Cathy.

== Personal life ==
She had a son and a daughter with John Carder Bush. Her final struggle with cancer is featured in a short video "Ceaseless Sound".

== Filmography ==
- ITV Playhouse (1 episode, 1970) as Liza Curtis
- Lust for a Vampire (1971) as Schoolgirl
- Twins of Evil (1971) as Schoolgirl (uncredited)
- Duck, You Sucker! (1971) as Coleen, John's Girlfriend (flashback)
- A Clockwork Orange (1971) as Handmaiden in Bible Fantasy
- Victor Victoria (1982) as Chambermaid
- The Draughtsman's Contract (1982) as Laundress
- The Ploughman's Lunch (1983) as Mum in Commercial
- Return of the Jedi (1983) as Dorovio Bold, Fighter Pilot (uncredited)
- Young Sherlock Holmes (1985) as Mrs. Holmes
- Babies (1997, TV Series) as Advertising Executive 2

== External links and sources ==
- Vivienne Chandler at IMDb
- Official website
