= An Astrological Guide for Broken Hearts =

Italian romantic comedy television series (2021–2022)

- Italian: Guida astrologica per cuori infranti
- Genre: Romantic comedy
- Created by: Bindu De Stoppani
- Based on: An Astrological Guide for Broken Hearts by Silvia Zucca
- Directed by: Bindu De Stoppani; Michela Andreozzi
- Starring: Claudia Gusmano; Michele Rosiello; Lorenzo Adorni; Alberto Paradossi
- Country of origin: Italy
- Original language: Italian
- No. of seasons: 2
- No. of episodes: 12

Production
- Running time: 30–38 minutes

Original release
- Release: 27 October 2021 – 8 March 2022

An Astrological Guide for Broken Hearts (Italian: Guida astrologica per cuori infranti) is an Italian romantic comedy television series based on the novel of the same name by Silvia Zucca. It was released on Netflix on 27 October 2021. After two seasons, the series was cancelled in 2022.

== Premise ==
Single and in her thirties, Alice works as a lowly production assistant at a small television network in Turin. To make matters worse, her ex-boyfriend Carlo is about to get married and become a father. Alice has a chance meeting with Tio, an actor from the network's flagship soap opera and self-proclaimed astrology guru, who soon becomes her personal astrological guide for broken hearts.

== Cast ==
=== Main ===
- Claudia Gusmano as Alice Bassi
- Michele Rosiello as Davide Sardi
- Lorenzo Adorni as Tiziano "Tio" Falcetti
- Alberto Paradossi as Carlo Barresi

=== Recurring ===
- Esther Elisha as Paola Costa
- Fausto Maria Sciarappa as Enrico Crippa
- Emanuela Grimalda as Marlin De Rose
- Lucrezia Bertini as Cristina Chioatto
- Giancarlo Ratti as Giordano Bodrato
- Bebo Storti as Guido Bassi
- Maria Amelia Monti as Ada Bassi
- Francesco Arca as Alejandro
- Euridice Axen as Barbara Buchneim
- Alberto Boubakar Malanchino as Andrea Magni
- Filippo De Carli as Guido
- Massimiliano Vado as Professor Klauzen
- Giampiero Mancini as Valentino Felice
- Noemi Iuvara as Raffaella Fannucci
- Raniero Monaco di Lapio as Luca
- Rebecca Mogavero as Mara D’Amico
- Sebastiano Di Bella as Sergio Russo
- Sarvarì Ferraris as Lisa Radonich
- Edoardo Di Pietro as Olmo Zambetti
- Alba Maria Porto as Michela Tabelli
- Gabriele Roma as Paolo Claretti
- Vittorio Martini as Riccardino
- Maria Elisa Pagano as Simona
- Silvia Di Santo as Sonia
- Leonardo Salerni as Giovanni
- Anna Maria Palma as Tio's grandmother

== Episodes ==
=== Series overview ===
Series	Episodes	Originally released
1	6	27 October 2021
2	6	8 March 2022

=== Season 1 ===
Season 1 was released on 27 October 2021.

No. overall	No. in season	Title	Duration	Original release date
1	1	"Aries" (Ariete)	36 min	27 October 2021
2	2	"Taurus" (Toro)	37 min	27 October 2021
3	3	"Gemini" (Gemelli)	30 min	27 October 2021
4	4	"Cancer" (Cancro)	38 min	27 October 2021
5	5	"Leo" (Leone)	33 min	27 October 2021
6	6	"Virgo" (Vergine)	33 min	27 October 2021

=== Season 2 ===
Season 2 was released on 8 March 2022.

No. overall	No. in season	Title	Duration	Original release date
7	1	"Libra" (Bilancia)	30 min	8 March 2022
8	2	"Scorpio" (Scorpione)	34 min	8 March 2022
9	3	"Sagittarius" (Sagittario)	31 min	8 March 2022
10	4	"Capricorn" (Capricorno)	34 min	8 March 2022
11	5	"Aquarius" (Acquario)	33 min	8 March 2022
12	6	"Pisces" (Pesci)	37 min	8 March 2022

== Production ==
The first season of the series was shot entirely in Turin, with filming locations including Arca Studios and the National Museum of Cinema. Principal photography began in February 2021.

The second season was filmed in Paris and Turin.
