= Antonio Gramsci: The Days of Prison =

1977 film by Lino Del Fra

- Directed by: Lino Del Fra
- Written by: Lino Del Fra; Cecilia Mangini; Piergiovanni Anchisi
- Starring: Riccardo Cucciolla; Lea Massari
- Cinematography: Gábor Pogány
- Edited by: Silvano Agosti
- Music by: Egisto Macchi
- Release date: 1977
- Language: Italian

Antonio Gramsci: i giorni del carcere (internationally released as Antonio Gramsci: The Days of Prison) is a 1977 Italian drama film directed by Lino Del Fra. It was awarded with the Golden Leopard at the Locarno International Film Festival.

== Plot ==
Antonio Gramsci, sentenced to twenty years in prison by the fascist courts, relives the stages of his political career and private life: in particular the foundation of the Italian Communist Party, the useless resistance to the right-wing offensive, marriage, arrest, the conflict with Palmiro Togliatti. In prison, the politician is first considered a hero, then shunned because of his unconventional views on Stalin and the authoritarian involution of the USSR. Discharged from prison for health reasons, he died in 1937 in a clinic in Rome.

== Cast ==
- Riccardo Cucciolla as Antonio Gramsci
- Lea Massari as Tania
- Mimsy Farmer as Giulia
- Jacques Herlin as Lo Santo
- Franco Graziosi as Dmitry Manuilsky
- Andrea Aureli as anarchist
- Umberto Raho as chaplain
- Luigi Pistilli as Gennaro Gramsci
- John Steiner as Laurin
- Biagio Pelligra as Bruno
- Paolo Bonacelli as Bocchini
- Antonio Piovanelli as Athos
- Luciano Bartoli as Worker in Turin
- Severino Saltarelli as Giovanni Laj
- Rate Furlan as Director of the prison
- Gianfranco Bullo as Palmiro Togliatti
- Pier Giovanni Anchisi as Worker in Turin
- Pier Paolo Capponi as Enrico
- Claudio Carafoli as Ercole
- Pier Luigi Giorgio as Giuseppe
- Gianni Pulone as Worker in Turin
- Pino Ammendola
- Pietro Biondi
- Sergio Gibello
- Antonio La Raina
- Fabrizio Miglione
- Raymond Pellegrin
- Bruno Rosa
- Gino Usai
