= Marco Leto =

Italian film director

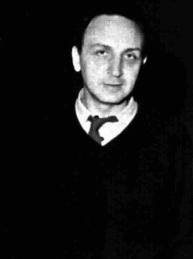
- Born: 18 January 1931; Rome, Italy
- Died: 21 April 2016 (aged 85); Rome, Italy
- Occupations: Film director, screenwriter
- Years active: 1960–1993

Marco Leto (18 January 1931 – 21 April 2016) was an Italian film and television director and screenwriter.

Born in Rome, Leto started his career in the 1950s as an assistant director in a large number of films. In 1965 he started a collaboration with RAI TV, for which he directed several serials and TV movies. After signing some screenplays, Leto made his film directorial debut in 1973, with the critically appreciated Black Holiday. In the following years he kept active both in cinema and in television.

== Selected filmography ==
- Pistol for a Hundred Coffins (1968, screenwriter)
- Dead Men Don't Count (1968, screenwriter)
- Dear Parents (1973, screenwriter)
- Black Holiday (1973, director and screenwriter)
- Al piacere di rivederla (1976, director and screenwriter)
