= Lino Del Fra =

Italian film director and screenwriter

Lino Del Fra (20 June 1927 – 19 July 1997) was an Italian director, screenwriter and film critic.

== Biography ==
Born in Rome, Del Fra graduated in philosophy and pedagogy from the Sapienza University of Rome, and started his career as a film critic, collaborating among others with the newspaper L'Avanti and the cinema magazines Cinema Nuovo and Bianco e Nero. He began his career as a documentary filmmaker in 1960. As a documentarist, he is best known for the 1962 film All'armi, siam fascisti!, he co-directed with Lino Miccichè and his wife and usual collaborator Cecilia Mangini.

In 1961, he won the San Marco Lion at the Venice International Film Festival for the short film Fata Morgana, which deals with southern Italian emigrants to Northern Italy.

After directing a segment of the anthology film I misteri di Roma, Del Fra made his narrative feature film debut in 1973, with Cake in the Sky. He won the Golden Leopard at the Locarno Film Festival for the 1977 film Antonio Gramsci: The Days of Prison.

== Selected filmography ==
- Fata Morgana (1961)
- All'armi, siam fascisti, co-directed with Cecilia Mangini and Lino Miccichè (1962)
- Stalin, co-directed with Cecilia Mangini (1963)
- I misteri di Roma, co-directed with Cecilia Mangini (1963)
- Cake in the Sky (1973)
- Antonio Gramsci: The Days of Prison (1977)
- Klon (1994)
