= The Indians Are Still Far Away =

1977 film

- Film poster
- Directed by: Patricia Moraz
- Written by: Patricia Moraz
- Produced by: Robert Boner
- Starring: Isabelle Huppert; Christine Pascal; Mathieu Carrière; Chil Boiscuille; Nicole Garcia
- Cinematography: Renato Berta
- Edited by: Thierry Derocles
- Production companies: Filmkollektiv Zürich AG; INA Institut National de l'Audiovisuel
- Release date: 1977
- Running time: 98 minutes
- Countries: Switzerland; France
- Language: French

The Indians Are Still Far Away (French: Les Indiens sont encore loin) is a 1977 Swiss-French drama film written and directed by Patricia Moraz and starring Isabelle Huppert. It follows the last days of a 17-year-old student, and received a commendation at the 1977 Locarno Film Festival.

== Background ==
The Indians Are Still Far Away formed the middle part of an intended trilogy by Patricia Moraz. Before directing the film, she had worked as a teacher, journalist and screenwriter. The first part was Le Chemin perdu, while a projected third film about adulthood was never made. Moraz had grown up in a politically engaged environment. She said she did not want to depict childhood solely in sentimental terms, but also to evoke a political and social context.

== Synopsis ==
Jenny Kern, a 17-year-old student, is found dead in the snow. The film follows the last days of her life without explaining her death or assigning responsibility, depicting the shifting emotions of adolescence and the social atmosphere in which her death becomes possible without being foreseeable.

== Cast ==
The cast includes:

- Isabelle Huppert as Jenny
- Christine Pascal as Lise
- Mathieu Carrière as Matthias
- Chil Boiscuille as Guillaume
- Nicole Garcia as Anna

== Reception ==
Filmdienst called the film an incisive and sensitive study of the post-1968 generation, and praised Renato Berta’s cool, almost blue-tinted cinematography along with the work of the lead actress and director. It also described the film as one focused on quiet gestures and feelings.

== Festival screenings ==
The film received a commendation from the Ecumenical Jury at the 1977 Locarno Film Festival, and was screened at the Solothurn Film Festival in January 1996.

== See also ==
- Isabelle Huppert on screen and stage
