= Doheny & Nesbitt =

Victorian Pub in Dublin, Ireland

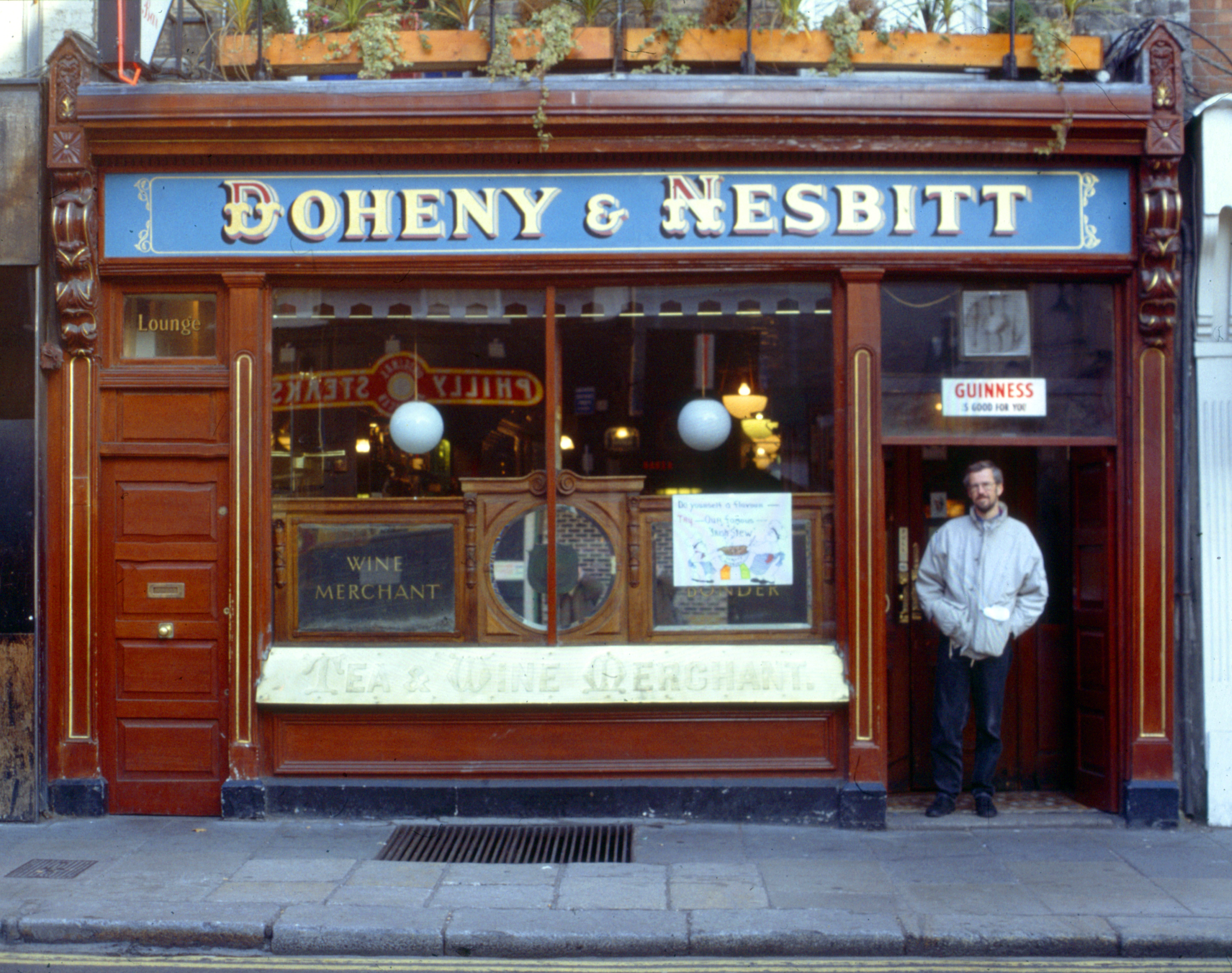
- Main façade in November 1993

- Location within Central Dublin

General information
- Type: 4 storey brown and red brick
- Architectural style: Victorian
- Location: 4–5 Lower Baggot Street, Dublin, Ireland
- Coordinates: 53.33804°N 6.2529°W
- Completed: c. 1840
- Owner: Swigmore Inns Ltd (Tom and Paul Mangan/Mangan Group)

Website
- dohenyandnesbitts.ie

Doheny & Nesbitt is a Victorian pub and restaurant on Baggot Street in Dublin, Ireland. The pub is a tourist attraction and notable political and media meeting place and has been described as "one of the most photographed" pubs in the city.

In his 1969 book Irish Pubs of Character, Roy Bulson describes the establishment thus: "Over 130 years old, it still maintains its original character. You can see old whiskey casks, pumps and tankards in the bar and the wood partitions, marble-topped tables together with the antique mirrors give a genuine and pleasant atmosphere in which to drink".

It was acquired by Tom and Paul Mangan for over IR£1m in 1987 and is still owned by them as of April 2020.

== Gallery ==
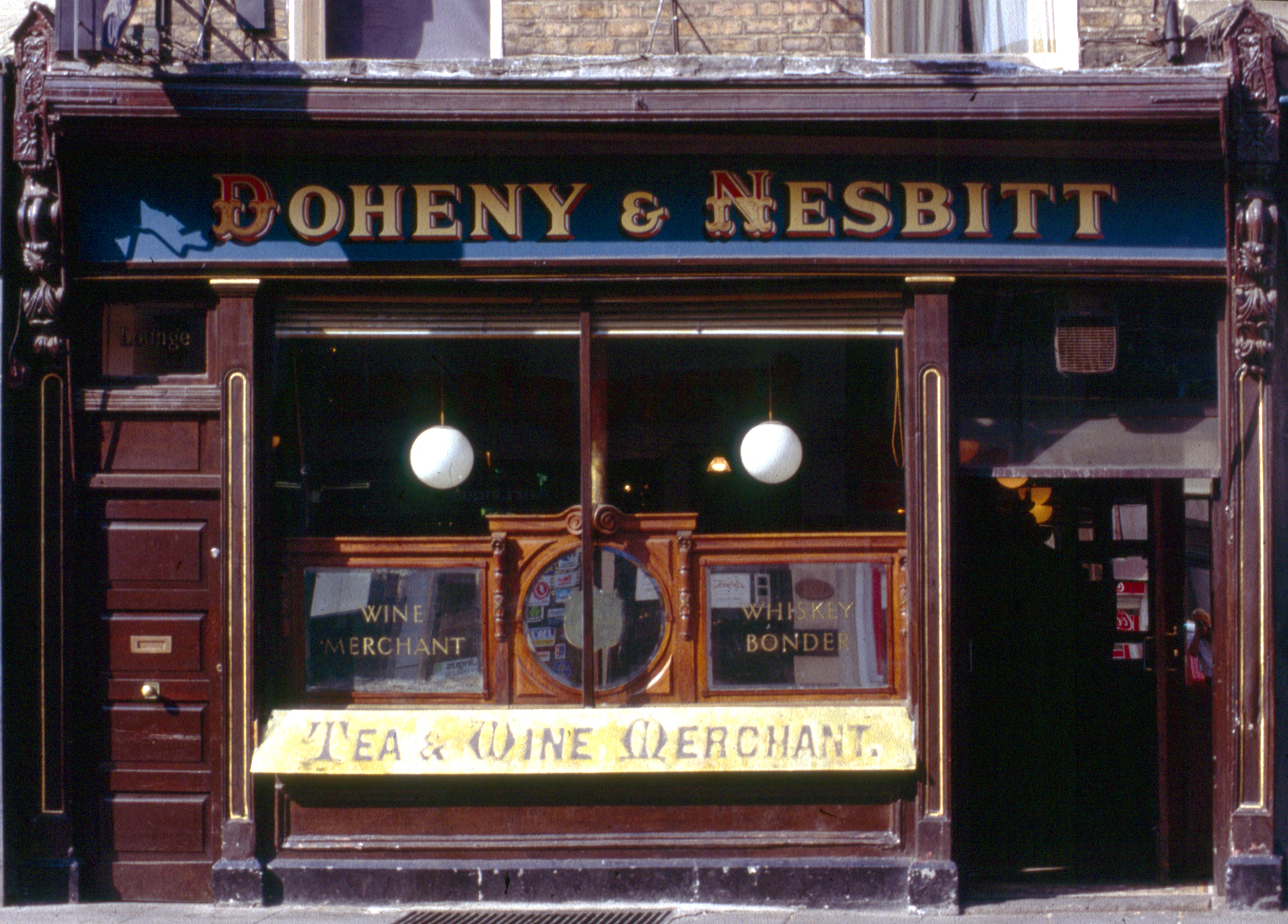
Doheny & Nesbitt in July 1989

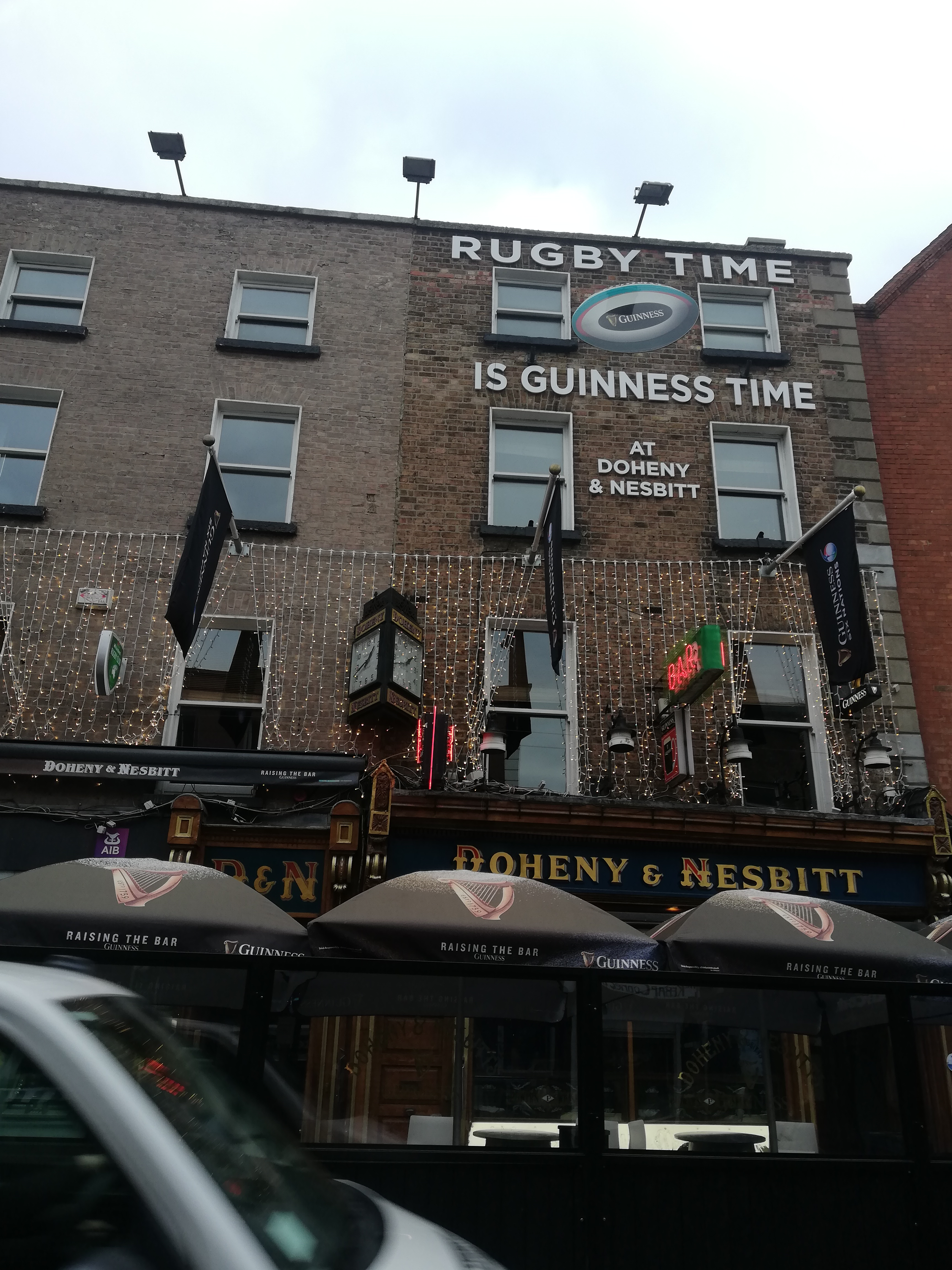
Pub exterior in 2022

== See also ==
- List of pubs in Dublin
- Toner's Pub

== Sources ==
- Bulson, Roy (1969). Irish Pubs of Character. Dublin: Bruce Spicer Ltd.
