= Lino Miccichè =

Italian film critic and historian (1934-2004)

- Born: Niccolò Miccichè; 31 July 1934; Caltanissetta, Kingdom of Italy
- Died: 1 July 2004 (aged 69); Rome, Italy
- Occupations: Film critic and historian

Niccolò "Lino" Miccichè (31 July 1934 – 1 July 2004) was an Italian film critic and film historian.

Born in Caltanissetta, Miccichè graduated in political sciences at the University of Florence. He made his debut as a film critic in 1956, working for various magazines and newspapers, notably L'Avanti!, as well as for radio and television programs. In 1964, he co-founded with Bruno Torri the Pesaro International Film Festival, which he directed for 25 years. In 1997 he briefly served as director of the Venice Film Festival, before becoming director of the Centro Sperimentale di Cinematografia. He was professor of history and critic of cinema at the Universities of Trieste, Siena and Roma Tre.

Miccichè also directed several short films and the 1962 documentary film All'armi, siam fascisti.
