= Macha Méril =

French actress and writer (born 1940)

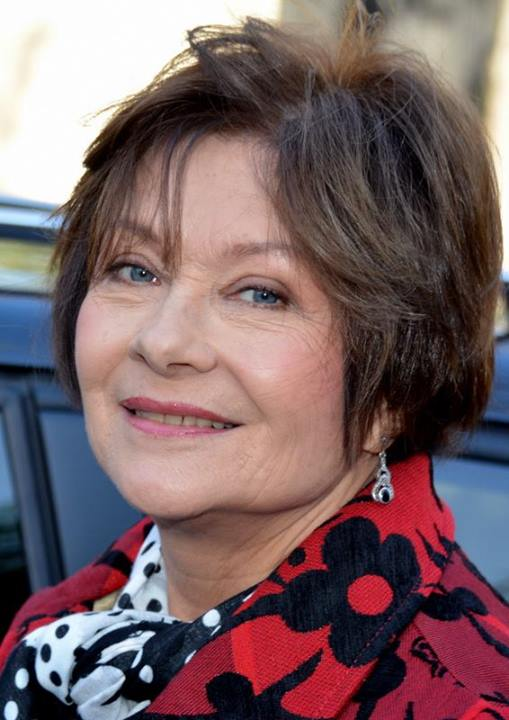
- Macha Méril in 2013
- Born: 3 September 1940 (age 86); Rabat, French Morocco
- Occupation: Actress
- Years active: 1960–present
- Spouse: Michel Legrand (m. 2014; died 2019)

Princess Maria-Magdalena Vladimirovna Gagarina (born 3 September 1940), known by her stage name Macha Méril (French pronunciation: [maʃa meʁil]), is a French actress, writer, and public commentator.

== Biography ==
Méril is descended by her father from the Russian princely house Gagarin and by her mother from a Ukrainian noble family. She appeared in 125 films between 1959 and 2012, including films directed by Jean-Luc Godard (A Married Woman / Une femme mariée), Luis Buñuel (Belle de jour), and Rainer Werner Fassbinder (Chinese Roulette).

She also appeared in the Quebec television series Lance et Compte. She is perhaps best known for her roles as Helga Ulmann in Dario Argento's Deep Red and in Aldo Lado's Night Train Murders (1975).

== Theater ==
Year	Title	Author	Director	Notes
1987	L'Éloignement	Loleh Bellon	Bernard Murat	Nominated for: Molière Award for Best Actress
1988–1989	The Seagull	Anton Tchekhov	Andrei Konchalovsky	
1990	L'Aiglon	Edmond Rostand	Jean-Luc Tardieu	
1993–1995	Roman Fever	Edith Wharton	Simone Benmussa	
1997	Bel Ami	Guy de Maupassant	Didier Long	
2006–2008	The Importance of Being Earnest	Oscar Wilde	Pierre Laville	
2006–2009	Feu sacré	George Sand	Simone Benmussa	
2009	Le Voyage de Victor	Nicolas Bedos	Nicolas Bedos	
2013	Rapport intime	Didier Van Cauwelaert	Alain Sachs	
2018	La Légende d'une vie	Stefan Zweig	Christophe Lidon	

== Filmography ==
Year	Title	Role	Director	Notes
1960	La main chaude	Yvette	Gérard Oury	
1960	Une question d'assurance		Pierre Kast	
1960	Dow Hour of Great Mysteries		William Graham	TV series (1 episode)
1961	Route 66	Perette Dijon	Sam Peckinpah	TV series (1 episode)
1961	Naked City	Gaby	William Graham	TV series (1 episode)
1962	Adorable Liar	Sophie	Michel Deville	
1962	The Sign of Leo	The blond at the 14th July	Éric Rohmer	
1962	Love on a Pillow	Raphaële	Roger Vadim	
1963	Sweet and Sour	The striptisist	Jacques Baratier	
1963	Who's Been Sleeping in My Bed?	Jacqueline Edwards	Daniel Mann	
1964	A Married Woman	Charlotte	Jean-Luc Godard	
1964	Anatomy of a Marriage: My Days with Jean-Marc	Nicole	André Cayatte	
1964	Anatomy of a Marriage: My Days with Françoise	Nicole	André Cayatte	
1964	Les petites demoiselles		Michel Deville	TV movie
1965	The Oil Prince	Lizzy	Harald Philipp	
1965	Der Fall Han van Meegeren	Tineke van Meegeren	André Michel	TV movie
1966	The Defector	Frieda Hoffmann	Raoul Lévy	
1966	Trois étoiles en Touraine		Maurice Régamey	TV movie
1967	L'horizon	Elisa	Jacques Rouffio	
1967	Belle de jour	Renée	Luis Buñuel	
1968	Au pan coupé	Jeanne Delaître	Guy Gilles	
1968	Ne jouez pas avec les Martiens	Maryvonne Guéguen	Henri Lanoë	
1968	L'auréole de plomb		André Michel	TV movie
1970	L'amore coniugale	Leda Pataneo	Dacia Maraini	
1971	We Are All in Temporary Liberty	Gisella	Manlio Scarpelli	
1972	La notte dei fiori	Macha	Gian Vittorio Baldi	
1972	We Won't Grow Old Together	Françoise	Maurice Pialat	
1974	Chinese in Paris	Madeleine Fontanes	Jean Yanne	
1974	Don't Hurt Me, My Love	Linda De Simone	Vittorio Sindoni	
1974	Sotto il placido Don	Caterina II	Vittorio Cottafavi	TV Mini-Series
1975	Deep Red	Helga Ulmann	Dario Argento	
1975	The Peaceful Age	Elsa	Fabio Carpi	
1975	Son tornate a fiorire le rose	Linda De Simone	Vittorio Sindoni	
1975	Last Stop on the Night Train	The Lady on the Train	Aldo Lado	
1975	The Last Day of School Before Christmas	Egle	Gian Vittorio Baldi	
1975	Il registratore		Gianni Amico	TV movie
1975	L'uomo dei venti	Anna	Carlo Tuzii	TV movie
1976	Chinese Roulette	Traunitz	Rainer Werner Fassbinder	
1976	Perdutamente tuo... mi firmo Macaluso Carmelo fu Giuseppe	Baroness Valeria Lamia	Vittorio Sindoni	
1976	Sins in the Country	Vincenzina Lo Curcio	Tiziano Longo	
1977	Pasión		Tonino Ricci	
1977	Delirio d'amore	Bianca	Tonino Ricci	
1977	Una donna di seconda mano	Clelia	Pino Tosini	
1977	Ride bene... chi ride ultimo	Esmeralda Benti Contini	Vittorio Sindoni	
1977	Emmenez-moi au Ritz	Barbara	Pierre Grimblat	TV movie
1977	Cinéma 16	Luce	Bernard Dubois	TV series (1 episode)
1978	Rock 'n' Roll	Annalisa	Vittorio De Sisti	
1978	En l'autre bord	Christine	Jérôme Kanapa	
1978	Robert et Robert	Agathe	Claude Lelouch	
1978	Ridendo e scherzando	Susy	Vittorio Sindoni	
1978	Tanto va la gatta al lardo...	Vera	Vittorio Sindoni	
1978	Va voir maman, papa travaille	Marianne	François Leterrier	
1978	Il y a encore des noisetiers	Jacqueline	Jean-Paul Sassy	TV movie
1979	La promessa	Signora Heller	Alberto Negrin	TV movie
1979	The Roses of Danzig	Elvira von Lehner	Alberto Bevilacqua	TV Mini-Series
1979	Morte a passo di valzer	Lady Flora Drayton	Giovanni Fago	TV Mini-Series
1980	Tender Cousins	Agnès	David Hamilton	
1980	Caméra une première	Jeanne	Jacques Fansten	TV series (1 episode)
1981	Beau-père	The Hostess	Bertrand Blier	
1981	Les Uns et les Autres	Magda Kremer	Claude Lelouch	
1981	Le bonheur des tristes	Madeleine	Caroline Huppert	TV movie
1981	La felicità		Vittorio De Sisti	TV Mini-Series
1981	Les enquêtes du commissaire Maigret	Lucie Decaux	Stéphane Bertin	TV series (1 episode)
1982	Le crime d'amour	Jeanne Bontemps / Odette Dumont	Guy Gilles	
1982	Chêne et lapins angora	Anna Grübel	Georges Wilson	TV movie
1982	L'apprentissage de la ville	Luc's mother	Caroline Huppert	TV movie
1983	Deadly Circuit	Madeleine	Claude Miller	
1983	Le grand carnaval	Armande Labrouche	Alexandre Arcady	
1983	For Those I Loved	Martin's mother	Robert Enrico	
1983	Lettres du bagne	Anne-Marie Gavrinis	Jean L'Hôte	TV movie
1983	Dorothée, danseuse de corde	The Comtesse de Chagny	Jacques Fansten	TV movie
1983	Les poneys sauvages		Robert Mazoyer	TV Mini-Series
1983	Les Uns et les Autres	Magda Kremer	Claude Lelouch	TV Mini-Series
1984	Les fauves	Sylvia	Jean-Louis Daniel	
1984	Cinéma 16	Claire	Pierre Bureau	TV series (1 episode)
1985	Vagabond	Madame Landier	Agnès Varda	Nominated - César Award for Best Supporting Actress
1985	Les Nanas	Françoise	Annick Lanoë	
1985	Les Rois du gag	Jacqueline	Claude Zidi	
1985	L'homme de pouvoir	Carole Cerf-Lebrun	Maurice Frydland	TV movie
1985	La robe mauve de Valentine	Valentine	Patrick Bureau	TV movie
1985	Colette	Colette	Gérard Poitou-Weber	TV Mini-Series
1985	Au nom de tous les miens	Martin's mother	Robert Enrico	TV Mini-Series
1986	Duet for One	Anya	Andrei Konchalovsky	
1986	Suivez mon regard	The opener's woman	Jean Curtelin	
1986	Macho	Anne-Marie Dutuillel	Nicolas Gessner	TV movie
1986	Investigatori d'Italia	Caterina	Paolo Poeti	TV series (1 episode)
1986–1989	He Shoots, He Scores	Maroussia Lambert	Jean-Claude Lord & Richard Martin	TV series (39 episodes)
1987	Chez le médecin	Madame Desrues	Pascal Aubier	Short
1988	La trajectoire amoureuse	The babouchka	Pascal Aubier	Short
1988	L'éloignement	Denise	Yves-André Hubert	TV movie
1989	La Vouivre	La Rodinet	Georges Wilson	
1989–1990	Laura und Luis	Viscida	Frank Strecker	TV series (6 episodes)
1991	Meeting Venus	Miss Malikoff	István Szabó	
1991	A Simple Story	Roccella's mother	Emidio Greco	
1991	Money	Madame Varles	Steven Hilliard Stern	TV movie
1991	Les mouettes	Madame Rose	Jean Chapot	TV movie
1992	Zuppa di pesce	Caterina	Fiorella Infascelli	
1992	Double Vision	Mrs. Perfect	Robert Knights	TV movie
1992	L'élixir d'amour	Madame Sabodet	Claude d'Anna	TV movie
1992	Marie-Galante		Jean-Pierre Richard	TV Mini-Series
1993	Berlin '39	Madame Vic	Sergio Sollima	
1993	Le Don	Margherita	David Delrieux	TV movie
1993	L'éternel mari	Claudia Pogoretz	Denys Granier-Deferre	TV movie
1994	Délit mineur	Madeleine	Francis Girod	
1994	Voyage en Pologne	Jeanne	Stéphane Kurc	TV movie
1994	Ho un segreto con papà		Gianpaolo Tescari	TV movie
1995	Le juge est une femme	Madame Vernier	Claude Grinberg	TV series (1 episode)
1996	Alla turca	Mélanie	Macha Méril	TV movie
1996	L'île aux secrets		Bruno Herbulot	TV movie
1996	Le crabe sur la banquette arrière	Catherine	Jean-Pierre Vergne	TV movie
1996	Morlock	Juliette d'Ortes	Yves Boisset	TV series (1 episode)
1997	Et si on faisait un bébé ?	Lucille	Christiane Spiero	TV movie
1998	A Soldier's Daughter Never Cries	Madame Beauvier	James Ivory	
1998	L'inventaire	Viviane Boyelles	Caroline Huppert	TV movie
1998	Belle grand-mère	Babou	Marion Sarraut	TV movie
1999	In punta di cuore	Mamie Berthe	Francesco Massaro	TV movie
1999	Tramontane	Bianca	Henri Helman	TV Mini-Series
2000	Le sciamane	Madre	Anne Riitta Ciccone	
2001	Un citronnier pour deux	Hélène	Élisabeth Rappeneau	TV movie
2001	Méditerranée	Carla	Henri Helman	TV series (2 episodes)
2002	Âges ingrats	Sabine	Cyril Gelblat	Short
2003	Rien, voilà l'ordre	Alexis's mother	Jacques Baratier	
2003	Rien ne va plus	Virginie Maurel de Ronchard	Michel Sibra	TV movie
2003	Belle grand-mère 2 - La trattoria	Babou	Marion Sarraut	TV movie
2003	L'agence coup de coeur	Jeanne	Stéphane Kurc	TV series (1 episode)
2004	Clochemerle	Baroness Alphonsine de Courtebiche	Daniel Losset	TV movie
2004	Famille, je vous haime	Jacqueline	Laurent Carcélès	TV movie
2004	Le fond de l'air est frais	Jacqueline	Laurent Carcélès	TV movie
2006	Mademoiselle Gigi	Mamita	Caroline Huppert	TV movie
2006	C'est arrivé dans l'escalier	Mademoiselle de Tassigny	Luc Béraud	TV movie
2006	Josephine, Guardian Angel	Tania Fournier	Laurent Levy	TV series (1 episode)
2007	René Bousquet ou Le grand arrangement	Evelyne Baylet	Laurent Heynemann	TV movie
2009	Trésor	Madame Girardon	Claude Berri & François Dupeyron	
2009	Hopital	Rose Marie	Maud Geffray & Sebastien Chenut	Short
2010	Les nuits d'Alice	Bettina	Williams Crépin	TV movie
2012	Happiness Never Comes Alone	Fanfan Keller	James Huth	
2012	Climats	Henriette Marcenat	Caroline Huppert	TV movie
2012	Malgré-elles	Alice Fabre	Denis Malleval	TV movie
2012	À dix minutes des naturistes	Suzy	Stéphane Clavier	TV movie
2013	Le bal des secrets	Rose	Christophe Barbier	TV Mini-Series
2013	Doc Martin	Bernadette Derville	François Velle	TV series (1 episode)
2014	The Price of Fame	Oona Chaplin (voice)	Xavier Beauvois	
2014	La Trouvaille de Juliette	Juliette	Jérôme Navarro	TV movie
2016	Alliances rouge sang	Béatrice	Marc Angelo	TV movie
2016	Mongeville	Natasha de Frénac	René Manzor	TV series (1 episode)
2017	Mr. Stein Goes Online	Marie	Stéphane Robelin	
2019	L'enfant que je n'attendais pas	Christine	Bruno Garcia	TV movie
