= Il notturno di Chopin =

2012 Italian film by Aldo Lado

- DVD cover
- Directed by: Aldo Lado
- Release date: 2012
- Country: Italy
- Language: Italian

Il notturno di Chopin (lit. The Chopin Nocturne or Chopin's Nocturne) is a 2012 Italian film directed by Aldo Lado.

== Plot ==
The plot revolves around the kidnapping of a little girl, Sofia, 9.

During her captivity she can hear Chopin's Nocturne in F major, Op. 15, No. 1 played somewhere nearby.

== Production ==
The cast chosen for ll notturno di Chopin is mostly composed of non professional actors. Some professional actors were also present, to a much lesser extent and in very small roles; among them were Davide Pulici, Manlio Gomarasca and Franca Gonella.

According to a review of the film, Lado explained in an interview that he had drawn inspiration for the story from the many cases of young girls who had disappeared in the region of Milan without leaving a trace, and that, the media treatment of such cases focused on the parents of the children, while he had wanted to focus on the victim and her experience.

== Release ==
The film was theatrically released in Italy on June 26, 2012. An Italian DVD version was released in 2014, with a new subtitle, Il notturno di Chopin: Prigionera del Tempo (lit. Prisoner (feminine) of Time).

== Reception ==
ll notturno di Chopin received mostly very positive reviews, some considering it one of Lado's major works. It has been compared to Lado's first film, Short Night of Glass Dolls (1971), for its subject (someone's mysterious disappearance) and to his second film Who Saw Her Die? (1972) for the central part played by a little girl. It has been described as "an object of art", experimental and intimist -most reviews concurring the film is for instance neither a thriller nor a giallo.
