= Laura Betti =

Italian actress (1934–2004)

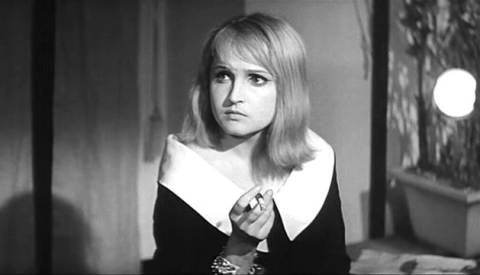
- Born: Laura Trombetti; 1 May 1934; Casalecchio di Reno, Bologna, Kingdom of Italy
- Died: 31 July 2004 (aged 70); Rome, Italy
- Occupation: Actress

Laura Betti (née Trombetti; May 1 1934 – 31 July 2004) was an Italian actress known particularly for her work with directors Federico Fellini, Pier Paolo Pasolini, and Bernardo Bertolucci. She had a long friendship with Pasolini and made a documentary about him in 2001.

Betti became famous for portraying bizarre, grotesque, eccentric, unstable or maniacal roles, such as Regina in Bernardo Bertolucci's 1900, Anna the medium in Twitch of the Death Nerve, Giovanna la pazza in Woman Buried Alive, hysterical Rita Zigai in Slap the Monster on Page One, Therese in Private Vices, Public Virtues, Emilia the servant in Pier Paolo Pasolini's Teorema, for which she won the Volpi Cup for Best Actress, and Mildred the protagonist's wife in Mario Bava's Hatchet for the Honeymoon.

== Early life ==
Born Laura Trombetti in Casalecchio di Reno, near Bologna, she grew up to be interested in singing. She first worked professionally in the arts as a jazz singer and moved to Rome.

== Film career ==
Betti made her film debut in Federico Fellini's La Dolce Vita (1960). In 1963, she became a close friend of the poet and movie director Pier Paolo Pasolini. Under his direction, she proved a wonderful talent and played in seven of his films, including La ricotta (1963), Teorema (Theorem, 1968), his 1972 version of The Canterbury Tales, in which she played Alice, the Wife of Bath, and his controversial Salò, or the 120 Days of Sodom (1975).

In 1976, Betti portrayed Regina, a cruel and eroto-maniacal fascist in Bernardo Bertolucci's 1900 (Novecento). She also played Miss Blandish in his Last Tango in Paris (1972), though her single scene was deleted.

In 1973, she dubbed the voice of the Devil for the Italian version of William Friedkin's The Exorcist.

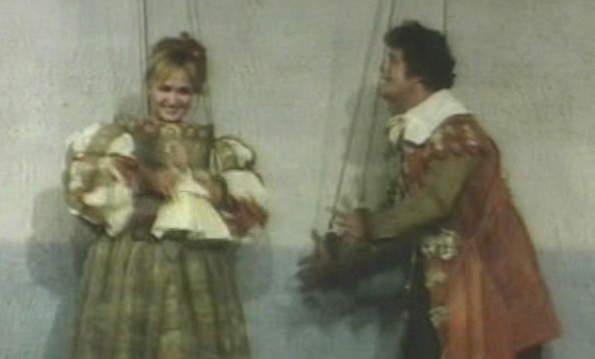
Betti with Franco Franchi (1965)

From the 1960s, Betti dedicated much of her time to literature and politics. She became the muse for a number of leading political and literary figures in Italy and came to personify the revolutionary and Marxist era of 1970s Italy.

In 2001, she made a documentary about Pasolini, Pier Paolo Pasolini e la ragione di un sogno. She also donated her papers related to their long friendship along with more than 1000 volumes and many documents connected to Pasolini to the archives of the Fondazione Cineteca di Bologna, thus creating the Centro Studi Archivio Pier Paolo Pasolini. This Centro, strongly wanted by Betti, owns also thousands of photograph and all the works of Pasolini: poetry, literature, cinema and journalism. After her death in 2004, her brother Sergio Trombetti has donated all the personal documents of her career to the Centro that has absorbed them under the name Fondo Laura Betti.

== Selected filmography ==
- La Dolce Vita (1960, directed by Federico Fellini) - Laura
- Escape by Night (1960, directed by Roberto Rossellini) - Teresa
- Labbra rosse (1960) - The Painter
- Ro.Go.Pa.G. (1963) - The 'Diva' (segment "La ricotta")
- The Witches (1967, produced by Dino De Laurentiis) - Male Tourist (segment "La terra vista dalla luna")
- Oedipus Rex (1967) - Jocasta's Maid (uncredited)
- Caprice Italian Style (1968) - Desdemona (segment "Che cosa sono le nuvole?")
- Teorema (1968) - Emilia, the servant, Betti won the Volpi Cup in the same year.
- Porcile (1969) - Madame Klotz (voice, uncredited)
- Paulina Is Leaving (1969) - Hortense
- Hatchet for the Honeymoon (1970, directed by Mario Bava) - Mildred Harrington
- Fermate il mondo... voglio scendere! (1970)
- A Man Called Sledge (1970, directed by Vic Morrow) - Sister
- A Bay of Blood (1971, directed by Mario Bava) - Anna Fosatti
- Nel nome del padre (1971) - Franco's Mother
- The Canterbury Tales (1972, directed by Pier Paolo Pasolini) - Alice, the Wife of Bath
- Sonny and Jed (1972, directed by Sergio Corbucci) - Betty
- Last Tango in Paris (1972) - Miss Blandish (scenes deleted)
- Slap the Monster on Page One (1972) - Rita Zigai
- Woman Buried Alive (1973, directed by Aldo Lado) - Giovanna la Pazza
- The Cousin (1974) - Rosalia
- Allonsanfàn (1974, directed by Paolo and Vittorio Taviani) - Esther
- Drama of the Rich (1974, directed by Mauro Bolognini) - Tisa Borghi
- The Woman in Red Boots (1974) - Leonore
- The Last Day of School Before Christmas (1975, directed by Gian Vittorio Baldi) - Passagera corriera
- Salò, or the 120 Days of Sodom (1975) - Signora Vaccari (voice, uncredited)
- Private Vices, Public Pleasures (1976, directed by Miklós Jancsó) - Therese
- 1900 (1976, directed by Bernardo Bertolucci) - Regina
- Le Gang (1977, directed by Jacques Deray) - Felicia
- Il gabbiano (1977, directed by Marco Bellocchio) - Irina
- At Night All Cats Are Crazy (1977, directed by Gérard Zingg) - Jacqueline
- Butterfly on the Shoulder (1978, directed by Jacques Deray) - Madame Carrabo
- The Word (1978, TV Mini-Series, directed by Richard Lang) - Maria
- Lovers and Liars (1979, directed by Mario Monicelli) - Laura
- La Luna (1979) - Ludovica (uncredited)
- Loin de Manhattan (1982) - Madame Hanska
- That Night in Varennes (1982) - Virginia Capacelli
- La Certosa di Parma (1982, TV Mini-Series, directed by Mauro Bolognini)
- La fuite en avant (1983) - Leonide
- L'Art d'aimer (1983) - Clio
- Retenez Moi...Ou Je Fais Un Malheur (1984) - Carlotta
- Klassenverhältnisse (1984, directed by Straub-Huillet) - Brunelda
- Mamma Ebe (1985, directed by Carlo Lizzani) - Lidia Corradi
- All the Fault of Paradise (1985, directed by Francesco Nuti) - Direttrice
- Corps et Biens (1986) - Laurie
- La chambre d'ami (1986)
- Sweets from a Stranger (1987, directed by Franco Ferrini) - Jolanda
- Jenatsch (1987) - Mademoiselle von Planta
- Noyade interdite (1987) - Keli
- Jane B. par Agnès V. (1988) - Lardy
- The Camels (1988, directed by Giuseppe Bertolucci) - Milena
- Le rose blu (1989) - La donna con la rosa blu
- Courage Mountain (1990) - Signora Bonelli
- Le champignon des Carpathes (1990) - Olympia
- Dames galantes (1990) - Catherine de Medicis
- Segno di fuoco (1990) - L'astrologa
- Caldo soffocante (1991) - Laura
- Mario, Maria and Mario (1993, directed by Ettore Scola) - Laura
- The Great Pumpkin (1993, directed by Francesca Archibugi) - Aida
- The Rebel (1993, directed by Aurelio Grimaldi) - Sister Valida
- With Closed Eyes (1994) - Beatrice
- Un eroe borghese (1995) - Dottoressa Trebbi
- We Free Kings (1996, directed by Sergio Citti)
- Marianna Ucrìa (1997, directed by Roberto Faenza) - Giuseppa
- An Air So Pure (1997, directed by Yves Angelo) - Mme Ruben
- The Protagonists (1999, directed by Luca Guadagnino) - Judge
- E insieme vivremo tutte le stagioni (1999)
- Fat Girl (2001, directed by Catherine Breillat) - Fernando's Mother
- Il diario di Matilde Manzoni (2002)
- Happiness Costs Nothing (2003, directed by Mimmo Calopresti) - Suora
- Household Accounts (2003, directed by Tonino Cervi) - Contessa Celi Sanguineti
- Gli astronomi (2003)
- Fratella e sorello (2004) - Presidente del Tribunale
- Raul: Straight to Kill (2004, directed by Andrea Bolognini) - Usuraia (final film role)

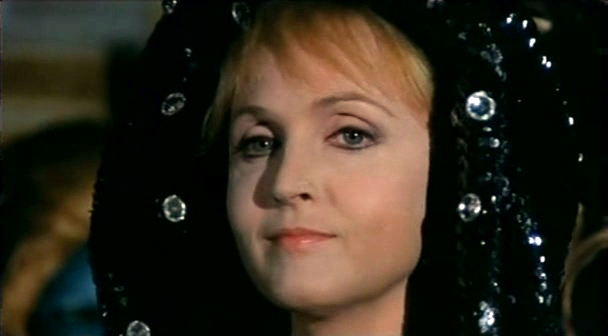
Betti in Hatchet for the honeymoon, by Mario Bava

== Discography ==
=== LP ===
- Laura Betti con l'orchestra di Piero Umiliani (Jolly LPJ 5020, 1960)
- Laura Betti canta Kurt Weill 1900-1933 (Ricordi SMRL 6031, 1963)
- Laura Betti canta Kurt Weill 1933-1950 (Ricordi SMRL 6032, 1963)

=== EP ===
- Laura Betti con Piero Umiliani e la sua orchestra. La commedia è finita/La canzone del giramondo/La canzone del tempo/Una venere ottimista (RCA Italiana A72U0220, 1958)
- Quattro canzoni con Laura Betti. Amare vuol dire mentire/ I hate Rome/ Lucciola/ Satellite (Jolly EPJ 3000, 1960)
- Laura Betti con l'orchestra di Piero Umiliani. Quella cosa in Lombardia/Piero/Io son' una (Jolly EPJ 3004, 1960)
- Laura Betti con l'orchestra di Piero Umiliani. Macrì Teresa detta Pazzia/Valzer della toppa/Cocco di mamma (Jolly EPJ 3005, 1960)
- Laura Betti con l'orchestra di Piero Umiliani. Venere tascabile/Vera signora/E invece no (Jolly EPJ 3006, 1960)
- Laura Betti dal film 'Cronache del '22' . Nel '22 sognavo già l'amore/Proprio oggi/Sulla strada che va a Reggio/La prima volta (Jolly EPJ3009, 1961)
- Laura Betti N.1. Je me jette/La parade du suicide/Je hais Rome/La belle Léontine (Chansons d'Orphée 150019, 1962)
- Laura Betti N.2. Je sais vivre/Piero/Maria le Tatuage/Une vraie dame (Chansons d'Orphée, 150021b, 1962)
- Laura Betti e Paolo Poli. Doppio EP. La bambinona/Guglielmino/La bella Leontine/Io Corpus Domini 1938/Mi butto/Donna bocca bella/Donna Lombarda/Orrenda madre/La Lisetta/La Ninetta/La Morettina/La Gigiotta (Carosello LC4001/2, 1964)
- Ordine e disordine. Ai brigoli di Casalecchio/M'hai scocciata, Johnny/Monologo della buca/Solitudine/Lamento del nord (I dischi del sole DS 40, 1965)

=== Singles ===
- Les pantoufles à papa/L'attesa (Rca Italiana N0595, 1957)
- Venere tascabile/Seguendo la flotta (Jolly J 20135, 1960)
- Ballata dell'uomo ricco/Ballata del pover'uomo (Jolly J 20128, 1961)
- E invece no/Solamente gli occhi (Jolly J 20136X45, 1961)
