= A Bay of Blood =

1971 film by Mario Bava

- Theatrical release poster
- Italian: Ecologia del delitto
- Directed by: Mario Bava
- Screenplay by: Mario Bava; Giuseppe Zaccariello (Note: Credited as Joseph McLee); Filippo Ottoni
- Story by: Dardano Sacchetti; Franco Barberi
- Produced by: Giuseppe Zaccariello
- Starring: Claudine Auger; Luigi Pistilli; Claudio Volonté; Anna M. Rosati; Laura Betti; Leopoldo Trieste; Brigitte Skay; Chris Avram; Isa Miranda
- Cinematography: Mario Bava
- Edited by: Carlo Reali
- Music by: Stelvio Cipriani
- Production company: Nuova Linea Cinematografica
- Distributed by: Nuova Linea Cinematografica
- Release date: 8 September 1971
- Running time: 84 minutes
- Country: Italy
- Language: Italian

A Bay of Blood (Italian: Ecologia del delitto, lit. 'Ecology of Crime' (Note: Although known by several different Italian-language titles, the film's original theatrical release title in Italy was Ecologia del delitto.), later retitled Reazione a catena, 'Chain Reaction'; also known as Carnage, Twitch of the Death Nerve and Blood Bath) is a 1971 Italian giallo film co-written and directed by Mario Bava and starring Claudine Auger, Luigi Pistilli, Claudio Volonté, Anna M. Rosati, Laura Betti, Leopoldo Trieste, Brigitte Skay, Chris Avram and Isa Miranda. The story details a string of mysterious murders that occur around the titular bay.

Widely considered Bava's most violent film, its emphasis on bloody murder set pieces, created by effects artist Carlo Rambaldi, was hugely influential on the slasher film subgenre that followed a decade later. In 2005, Total Film magazine named A Bay of Blood one of the 50 greatest horror films of all time.

== Plot ==
One night at her bayside mansion, Countess Federica Donati is attacked and strangled to death by her husband, Filippo, who stages the murder as a suicide. Shortly afterwards, Filippo is stabbed to death by an assailant, who removes his corpse from the scene. Police find what they believe to be a suicide note written by the countess but fail to locate Filippo. Architect Franco Ventura travels to the property in order to have Filippo sign over ownership of the bay, unaware that Filippo has been killed. Filippo's daughter, Renata, and her husband, Alberto, travel to the bay with their two children to determine Filippo's whereabouts.

Four gallivanting friends—Luca, Roberto, Sylvie, and Louise—trespass on the property and break into the seemingly deserted mansion. Louise goes skinny-dipping alone and encounters Filippo's corpse in the bay. While seeking the rest of the group, Louise is pursued and murdered by an assailant with a billhook. The assailant also uses the billhook to murder Roberto, then impales Luca and Sylvie with a spear while they have sex.

Alberto and Renata meet an eccentric entomologist named Paolo Fossati and his fortune teller wife, Anna, from whom they learn about Simone, the countess's illegitimate son, who lives by the bay as a fisherman. Alberto and Renata question Simone about Filippo and discover Fillipo's corpse in Simone's boat, though Simone says that he found the body in the bay. Alberto leaves Renata at Ventura's cottage while he gets their car. Renata discovers the bodies of Luca, Roberto, Sylvie, and Louise in Ventura's bathroom. Ventura attacks Renata with an axe, but Renata stabs him with scissors and leaves him for dead. Paolo and Anna separately discover the bodies at Ventura's cottage and are killed by Alberto and Renata before they can alert the police.

Ventura's secretary and lover, Laura, arrives at Ventura's cottage. She discovers that Ventura is wounded, and he tells her to bring Simone. At his cabin, Simone accuses Laura of conspiring with Ventura and Filippo to kill the countess. Laura confesses that Ventura had her seduce Filippo, but falsely claims that she did not know that Filippo would kill the countess. Simone strangles her to death. It is revealed that Simone killed Filippo, Louise, Roberto, Luca, and Sylvie, and that Ventura convinced him to sign away the property for a payoff, airline tickets, and a fake passport. Alberto and Renata follow Simone from his cabin, and Alberto kills him as part of the couple's plan to obtain the property. The couple returns to Ventura's cottage, where the still-alive Ventura attacks Alberto, who kills him after a struggle. Alberto burns the documents signed by Simone and Ventura.

Alberto and Renata prepare to return home to await the announcement of their inheritance when they are shot dead by their son, who has mistaken their shotgun for a toy. The son and daughter think their parents are playing dead and rush outside to play along the bay.

== Cast ==
- Claudine Auger as Renata Donati
- Luigi Pistilli as Alberto (Albert in the English version)
- Claudio Volonté as Simone (Simon)
- Anna M. Rosati as Laura
- Chris Avram as Franco Ventura (Frank Ventura)
- Leopoldo Trieste as Paolo Fossati (Paul Fossati)
- Laura Betti as Anna Fossati
- Brigitte Skay as Louise (Brunhilde)
- Isa Miranda as Countess Federica Donati
- Paola Rubens as Sylvie (Denise)
- Guido Boccaccini as Luca (Duke)
- Roberto Bonanni as Roberto (Bobby)
- Giovanni Nuvoletti as Count Filippo Donati
- Renato Cestiè as Renata and Alberto's son (uncredited)
- Nicoletta Elmi as Renata and Alberto's daughter (uncredited)

== Production ==
=== Development and writing ===
The genesis of A Bay of Blood was when producer Dino De Laurentiis heard that Dardano Sacchetti, screenwriter of the popular The Cat o' Nine Tails, had fallen out with the film's director Dario Argento. He contacted Sacchetti and persuaded him to collaborate with director Mario Bava on a giallo film. Sacchetti and Bava got along well, and together came up with a story in which two parents commit murder to secure a better future for their children. In this early version of the story, the parents are driven to commit one murder after another in a chain reaction, becoming so caught up in their plan that they abandon their children for several days. When they return home, the starving and terrified children kill them. The 13 murders were conceived as isolated sequences, with no initial idea of how they would fit into the story; Sacchetti credits Bava with the idea of two people being killed with a spear while making love and himself with the idea of a woman being killed in her wheelchair.

Sacchetti wrote the first draft of the script, titled Cosi imparano a fare i cattivi ("That Will Teach Them to Be Bad") after a line spoken by the children after killing their parents, with his writing partner Franco Barbieri. However, spectacular arguments with Bava and the production team led to Barbieri being fired, and Sacchetti quit as an act of solidarity with his partner. De Laurentiis, disenchanted when The Cat o' Nine Tails failed to recreate its domestic popularity when released abroad, also abandoned the project.

Bava, owing a massive amount in back taxes, felt he needed to complete a film soon, and turned to Giuseppe Zaccariello (who had silently backed Bava's earlier films Hatchet for the Honeymoon and Five Dolls for an August Moon) to take over as producer. Zaccariello insisted that the shooting script be written by Filippo Ottoni, who was reluctant to take the job since he did not like exploitation films. Numerous other writers, including Zaccariello himself, had their hands involved in devising the final screenplay.

=== Casting ===
The cast included Laura Betti, who had got along well with Bava on Hatchet for the Honeymoon. At the time De Laurentiis approached Bava about working with Sacchetti, Bava and Betti had been toying with the idea of making a film called Odore di carne ("stench of flesh") about cannibalism on Los Angeles colleges.

=== Filming ===
The film began production in early 1971, still under the shooting title Cosi imparano a fare i cattivi, which was soon changed to Reazione a catena ("chain reaction"). Yet another title used during shooting was La baia d'argento ("the bay of silver"), discarded for fear that the film would be perceived as a parody of Dario Argento's works as a result. The final title of Ecologia del delitto was suggested by Zaccariello because the word "ecologia" was in vogue at the time. The film's budget was extremely low, and it had to be shot very quickly and cheaply. Due to the severe budgetary restrictions, Bava not only acted as his own cinematographer, but also utilized a simple child's wagon for the film's many tracking shots.

Unusually for an Italian film of the time, Bava shot alternate dialogue takes in both Italian (for the domestic release) and in English (for international distribution) for ease of dubbing. Aside from some different character names, the two versions differ in runtime by approximately one minute.

The location shooting was mostly completed at Zaccariello's Sabaudia beach house and its outlying property. Bava had to resort to various camera tricks to convince the audience that an entire forest existed when in fact, only a few scattered trees were at the location. Betti recalled: "All of this had to occur in a forest. But where was it? Bava said, 'Don't worry. I will do the forest'. And he found a florist who was selling these little stupid branches with little bits of foliage on them, and he began to make them dance in front of the camera! We had to act the scenes strictly in front of those branches—if we moved even an inch either way, the 'woods' would disappear!"

=== Special effects ===
To ensure the utmost realism in depicting the thirteen different murders, Carlo Rambaldi was hired to provide the special make-up effects. To create the deaths of Anna, Louise, and Sylvie, wax effigies of the actresses' throats and backs were constructed and rigged to expulse brightly colored blood when cut. The illusion of Roberto being stabbed in the face with a billhook was achieved with a prop blade which was swiftly pulled out of frame to hide the fact that it was sculpted to conform exactly to actor Roberto Bonanni's profile.

== Release ==
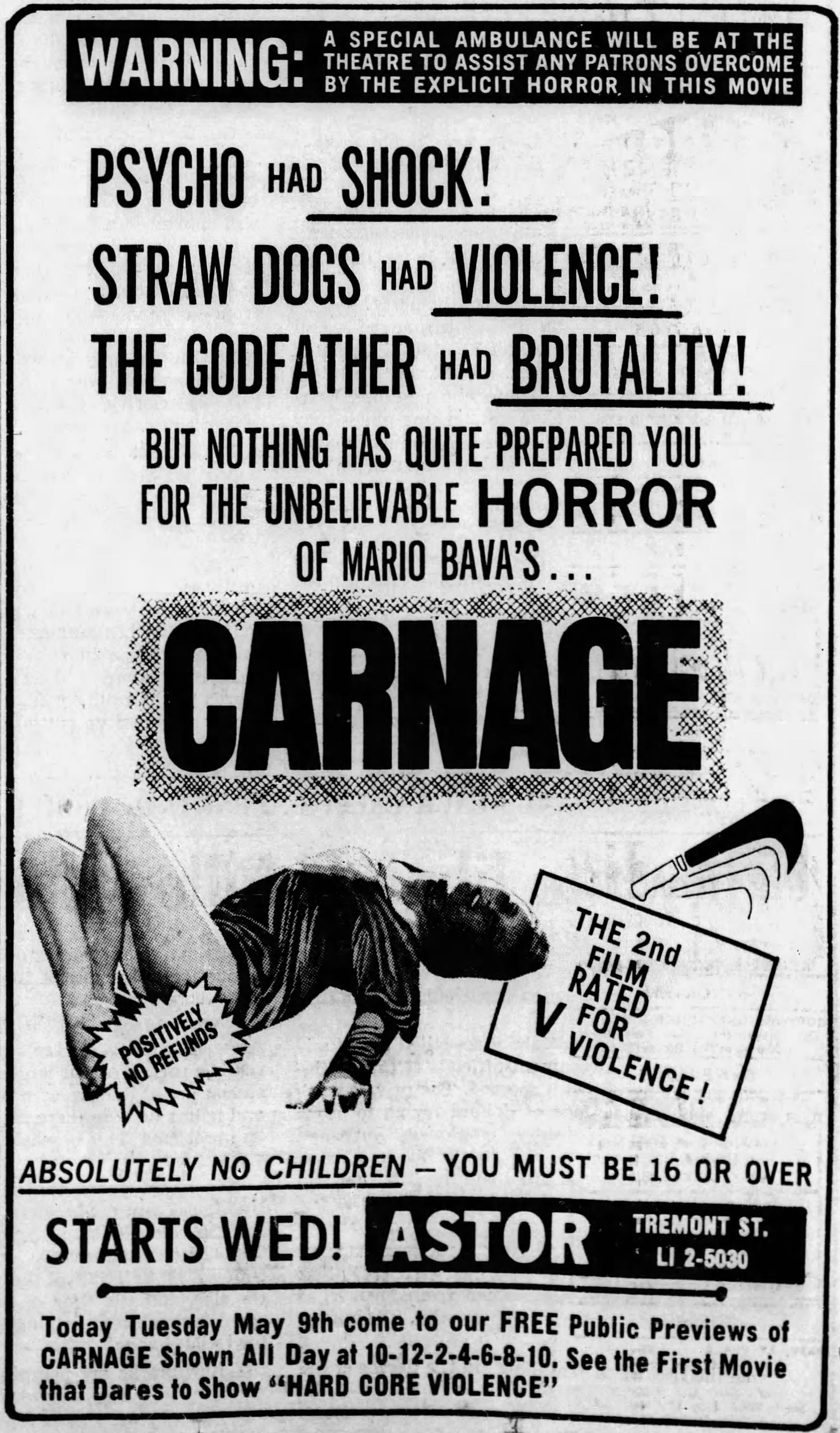
U.S. theatre advertisement under the title Carnage, 1972

A Bay of Blood was promoted with multiple different titles in Italy. The film was announced as Antefatto ("Before the Fact"), but when finally released to theatres, the title had changed to Ecologia del delitto ("Ecology of Crime"). When the film did poorly on its initial release, it was pulled from Italian theaters and retitled Reazione a Catena ("Chain Reaction"), and was later re-released as Bahia de Sangre ("Bay of Blood" in Spanish).

A Bay of Blood was acquired up for US distribution in 1972 by Steve Minasian's Hallmark Releasing, which specialized in exploitation films. Premiering the film under its original English title, Carnage, Hallmark copied their successful advertising campaign for Mark of the Devil by proclaiming that Bava's film was "The Second Film Rated 'V' for Violence!" (Devil having been the first). This campaign prompted a lawsuit from the Motion Picture Association of America on the grounds that it intruded on their exclusive right to rate motion pictures, and the film was withdrawn and re-released under the now common title Twitch of the Death Nerve with an R rating appearing in advertisements. Thanks to Hallmark's distribution partnership with Bava's former employer American International Pictures, the film played for years under this title in drive-ins and grindhouses throughout the country as part of a double or triple bill with other Hallmark/AIP films, most notably Wes Craven's equally-influential The Last House on the Left and Fernando Di Leo's Slaughter Hotel, but it has since been re-released theatrically and on home video under a variety of titles. In the US alone, its later titles include A Bay of Blood, Last House on the Left Part II, Last House Part II and New House on the Left.

=== Critical response ===
A Bay of Blood was greeted with extreme controversy and disappointment by several critics, especially by those who were fans of the director's earlier, more restrained films. At the 1971 Avoriaz Film Festival, where the film had its world premiere, Christopher Lee attended a screening of the film, having expressed an interest in seeing the latest effort from the director of The Whip and the Body, which Lee had starred in eight years before. Lee was reportedly completely revolted by the film. The festival jurors awarded the film the Best Make-Up and Special Effects Award. Rambaldi's effects work also earned the film a "Special Mention" Award at the prestigious Sitges Film Festival in 1971.

Controversy of the film continued in subsequent years and maintained a mixed critical response. Jeffrey Frentzen, reviewing the film for Cinefantastique, called Twitch of the Death Nerve "the director's most complete failure to date. If you were appalled by the gore and slaughter in Blood and Black Lace, this latest film contains twice the murders, each one accomplished with an obnoxious detail ... Red herrings are ever-present, and serve as the only interest keeping the plot in motion, but nothing really redeems the dumb storyline". Gary Johnson, on his Images website, said that "Twitch of the Death Nerve is made for people who derive pleasure from seeing other people killed ... The resulting movie is guaranteed to make audiences squirm, but the violence is near pornographic. In the same way that pornographic movies reduce human interactions to the workings of genitals, Twitch of the Death Nerve reduces cinematic thrills to little more than knives slicing through flesh". Phil Hardy's The Aurum Film Encyclopedia: Horror, while noting that Bava was able to "achieve some striking images", opined "zooms, no doubt programmed by the imperative to work quickly, spoil some scenes that cried out for Bava's particularly fluid use of camera movement which were so much in evidence in Operazione Paura (1966)".

On the review aggregator website Rotten Tomatoes, A Bay of Blood holds an approval rating of 80% based on 15 reviews, with an average rating of 6.8/10. Joe Dante was enthusiastic about the film, writing in The Film Bulletin (later reprinted in Video Watchdog) that it "features enough violence and gore to satisfy the most rabid mayhem fans and benefits from the inimitably stylish direction of horror specialist Mario Bava (Black Sunday). Assembled with a striking visual assurance that never ceases to amuse, this is typical Bava material, simply one ghastly murder after another – 13 in all – surrounded by what must be one of the most preposterous and confusing plots ever put on film". In Fangoria, Tim Lucas wrote thirteen years after the film's theatrical release that "Twitch unreels like a macabre, ironic joke, a movie built like an inescapable trap for its own anti-hero ... Seen today, the violence in this movie remains as potent and explicit as anything glimpsed in contemporary 'splatter' features ..."

=== Legacy ===
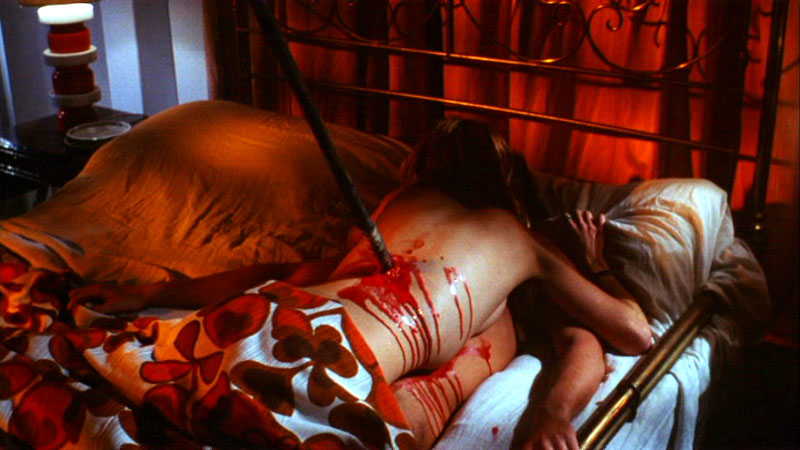
A snapshot of a murder scene in the film where a couple is impaled by an assailant with a spear in a bed. This scene has been imitated, notably in the film Friday the 13th Part 2 (1981).

Several critics have noted that the film is probably the most influential of Bava's career, as it had a huge and profound impact on the slasher film genre. It has also been credited as his most impactful work in the international cinema. Writing in 2000, Tim Lucas wrote that Bava's film is "the acknowledged smoking gun behind the 'body count' movie phenomenon of the 1980s, which continues to dominate the horror genre two decades later with such films as Scream, I Know What You Did Last Summer and their respective sequels". According to Gary Johnson, "Twitch of the Death Nerve is one of the most imitated movies of the past 30 years. It helped kick start the slasher genre ... [Bava's] influence still resonates today (although somewhat dully) in movies such as I Know What You Did Last Summer, Scream and Urban Legend". It was listed at No. 94 in IndieWire's "The 100 Greatest Horror Movies of All-Time", with its entry stating that the film "remains a vital watch for horror fans, and a reminder of how Bava continued to push horror into new and interesting realms, the reverberations of which are still felt today".

Several commentators have noted that two sequences in the 1981 film Friday the 13th Part 2 are strikingly similar to two of Bava's murder sequences: one character is slammed in the face with a hawkbill machete, though Bava's film had a billhook instead, and two teenage lovers are interrupted when a spear impales both of them. Along with The Burning, Just Before Dawn (Both 1981) and several other similarly plotted slashers, Friday the 13th specifically "followed Bava's inspired cue, having young people stalked by violent death amid beautiful wooded settings".
