= Fiona Gélin =

French actress (born 1962)

- Born: Bénédicte Gélin; 22 May 1962 (age 64); Boulogne-Billancourt, France
- Occupations: Film and stage actress
- Years active: 1981-
- Relatives: Xavier Gélin (half-brother); Maria Schneider (half-sister)

Fiona Gélin is a French actress.

Born Bénédicte Gélin, the daughter of actor Daniel Gélin, she started her acting career at an early age and made her breakthrough in cinema with the role Inspector Sabine Clément in the 1985 José Pinheiro film Parole de flic starring Alain Delon. Another role worthy of mention came in 1987 with Aldo Lado film Scirocco. Through her father, her half-siblings were Xavier Gélin and Maria Schneider. They were also actors.

== Filmography ==
- Scirocco (1987)
- Oh God, Women Are So Loving (1994)
