= The Cousin =

- Directed by: Aldo Lado
- Written by: Luisa Montagnana; Massimo Franciosa from the novel by Ercole Patti
- Produced by: Felice Testa Gay
- Starring: Massimo Ranieri; Dayle Haddon; Stefania Casini; Christian De Sica
- Cinematography: Gábor Pogány
- Edited by: Alberto Galletti
- Music by: Ennio Morricone
- Production company: Testa Gay Cinematografica
- Distributed by: Unidis
- Release date: 26 July 1974
- Running time: 92 minutes
- Country: Italy
- Language: Italian

The Cousin (Italian: La cugina, same meaning but with feminine expressed) is a 1974 Italian romance film by the director Aldo Lado, with a score by Ennio Morricone. From a novel by Ercole Patti, it tells the coming of age stories of a group of young people in Sicily in the 1950s.

== Summary ==
Like other young bourgeois men, Enzo learns about sex with servants, whores and married women. None excite him like his alluring cousin Agata, who has tantalised him with erotic games since childhood. Her ambition, however, is to keep her virginity and make an advantageous marriage. She sets her sights on Nini, amiable but dim, who is a nobleman and has a country estate. To force his hand, a venal priest arranges a fake abduction and then marries the pair. Now baroness and mistress of a vast palazzo, she discovers that her precious virginity was wasted on Nini, who is uninterested in marital sex. When a proud Enzo comes round to tell the two that he has graduated, she gives herself to him at last.

== Production ==
In an interview published in 2005 the director said the story of the original novel was altered so that the erotic tension between the two cousins gradually intensified up to the time of their final encounter. When filming it, he and his cinematographer decided to alternate between normal time and slow motion: “What I wanted to convey was that for them at that moment time as we know it had ceased to exist.”

== Cast ==
- Massimo Ranieri as Enzo
- Dayle Haddon as Agata
- Christian De Sica as Ninì Scuderi
- Stefania Casini as Lisa Scuderi
- Loredana Martinez as Giovannella
- Stefano Oppedisano as Ugo
- Francesca Romana Coluzzi as Deputy's Wife
- José Quaglio as Fragalà
- Laura Betti as Rosalia
- Conchita Airoldi as Maid
- Luigi Casellato as Peppino
- Cinzia Romanazzi as Carmela
- Lisa Seagram as Murderess
