= Teresa Ann Savoy =

British-born actress (1955–2017)

- Born: 18 July 1955; London, England
- Died: 9 January 2017 (aged 61); Milan, Italy
- Other names: Therese Ann Savoy, Terry
- Occupation: Actress
- Years active: 1974–2000
- Children: 2

Teresa Ann Savoy, FRSA (18 July 1955 – 9 January 2017) was a British actress who appeared in a number of Italian films.

== Biography ==
Savoy was 18 years old when she appeared in the October 1973 edition of Italian adult magazine Playmen, using an alias of "Terry." Savoy, who fled from home at 16, was living in a hippie community in Sicily and soon came to the attention of the press.

Savoy's acting career began in 1974 when film director Alberto Lattuada gave her her first role. She played Clotilde in the film Le farò da padre (I'll Take Her Like a Father).

Her next film was in 1975 in Vizi privati, pubbliche virtù (Private Vices, Public Pleasures) directed by the Hungarian director Miklós Jancsó. The film told the story of the Crown Prince Rudolf, son of the Austrian-Hungarian Emperor Franz Joseph, and his rebellion against his father. Savoy played the baroness Mary Vetsera, Rudolf's lover, but in Jancso's vision, she appears as an intersex person.

Savoy met Tinto Brass in 1975 and worked with him the following year in the film Salon Kitty. She played a young girl in the League of German Maidens who becomes a spy that poses as a prostitute for the SS Nazi paramilitary organization. In 1979, Brass directed her again as Drusilla in the controversial film Caligula.

In 1977, Savoy played Jamilah in the made-for-TV Italian film Sandokan alla riscossa! (Sandokan to the Rescue) based on the Sandokan novels by Emilio Salgari.

Savoy made a return to cinema in 1981 with La disubbidienza (Disobedience) by Aldo Lado, where she played Edith, an attractive Jewish governess. The film covered events under the reign of the Republic of Salò. She worked with Miklós Jancsó again in the film A zsarnok szíve, avagy Boccaccio Magyarországon (The Tyrant's Heart) the same year.

At this point, Savoy's stardom had faded and she was relegated to supporting roles in obscure movies and television series. In 1982, she had a cameo in the mini-series La Certosa di Parma (The Charterhouse of Parma). In 1984, she was a terrorist in the low budget movie Il ragazzo di Ebalus (The Boy from Ebalus). In 1986, she took the part of Maria di Gallese, the first wife of the writer and poet Gabriele D'Annunzio (played by Robert Powell), in the film D'Annunzio. The same year, she appeared in La Donna del Traghetto (The Woman of the Ferry).

Savoy received the title of Fellow of the Royal Society of Arts in 1989.

Savoy made her last film appearance in 2000 in La fabbrica del vapore (The Steam Factory), the first Italian digital movie.

== Death ==
Savoy died of cancer on 9 January 2017 in Milan, where she lived with her husband and two children.

== Legacy ==
In 2021, Spanish journalist and writer Martín Llade published the novel Lo que nunca sabré de Teresa (What I'll Never Know About Teresa), in which he reconstructs Savoy's life and career.

== Filmography ==
Year	Title	Role
1974	Le farò da padre (I'll Take Her Like a Father)	Clotilde Spina
1976	Salon Kitty	Margherita
1976	Vizi privati, pubbliche virtù (Private Vices, Public Pleasures)	Mary
1977	Sandokan alla riscossa! (Sandokan to the Rescue)	Jamilah
1979	Caligula	Drusilla
1981	La disubbidienza	Edith
1981	The Tyrant's Heart	Katalin
1984	Il ragazzo di Ebalus	Young terrorist
1986	La Donna del Traghetto	
1987	D'Annunzio	Maria di Gallese
2000	La fabbrica del vapore	Magazziniera
