= Roger Leenhardt =

French writer and filmmaker

Roger Leenhardt (23 July 1903 – 4 December 1985) was a French writer and filmmaker.

== Early life ==
Born in a bourgeois Protestant family, this brilliant student of philosophy was very soon fascinated by cinema. Through a cousin, he started working for the newsreel program Éclair Journal and in 1934 set up his own production company with René Zuber, "Les Films du Compas," later known as, "Roger Leenhardt Films.”

== Career ==
As a critic in the journal Esprit, he was considered one of the most perceptive observers of pre-war France and strongly influenced André Bazin and the entire "Nouvelle Vague.”

Thanks to his series of articles known as "La petite école du spectateur," cinema became considered as an art and a language in its own right. Leenhardt also contributed to other journals, such as Fontaine, Les Lettres Françaises, and l'Ecran français, in which in 1948 he delivered his famous cry, "Down with Ford! Long Live Wyler!"

In 1949, he fostered the creation of the cinema club Objectif 49 of which he was the co-president with Robert Bresson and Jean Cocteau. Destined to promote a new cinema d'auteur, the club resulted in the creation in Biarritz of the Festival of Cursed Films [Festival des Films Maudits]. Beginning in the 1950s he presided over the French Association for the Promotion of Cinema [Association française pour la diffusion du cinéma] which organized a traveling festival, Cinéma Days [Les Journées du cinéma] (1953–1960). Finally, in 1955 Leenhardt participated in the creation in Tours of the International Days of Film [Journées internationales du film] which became the Festival of Tours. Specialized in short films, the festival brought together the foremost filmmakers, including François Truffaut, Chris Marker, Agnès Varda, Jacques Demy, Roman Polanski, Robert Enrico, and others.

His documentary works are numerous and include the creation of more than 60 short films and the production of a similar number. There are two main categories of his work: Portraits of great writers (e.g. François Mauriac, Paul Valéry, Victor Hugo, etc.), and portraits of famous painters (e.g., Monet, Pissarro, Bazile, etc.). He also made a film on the origins of photography (Daguerre ou la Naissance de la photographie, 1964) and another on the invention of cinema (Naissance du cinéma, 1946), a masterpiece of pedagogical and intelligence. Privileging his artist vision, Leenhardt made only three feature-length fiction films: Les Dernières Vacances (1948), Le Rendez-vous de minuit (1961), and, for television, Une fille dans la montagne (1964).

Moreover, Roger Leenhardt appeared in three films as an actor. In Les Dernières vacances, he is the teacher. Jean-Luc Godard chose him to be the character "Intelligence" in Une femme mariée (1964) and François Truffaut chose him as the publisher in L'Homme qui aimait les femmes (1977).

He died from a heart attack in Paris on 4 December 1985.
