= Short Night of Glass Dolls =

- Directed by: Aldo Lado
- Produced by: Enzo Doria; Dieter Geissler
- Starring: Ingrid Thulin; Jean Sorel; Mario Adorf; Barbara Bach; Fabijan Šovagović; José Quaglio; Piero Vida; Relja Bašić; Daniele Dublino
- Cinematography: Giuseppe Ruzzolini
- Edited by: Mario Morra
- Music by: Ennio Morricone
- Production companies: Doria Cinematografica; Dieter Geissler Filmproduktion GmbH; Jadran Film
- Release dates: 28 October 1971 (Italy); 30 May 1972 (West Germany)
- Running time: 97 minutes
- Countries: Italy; West Germany

Short Night of Glass Dolls (Italian: La corta notte delle bambole di vetro) is a 1971 giallo film directed by Aldo Lado in his directorial debut, and starring Ingrid Thulin, Jean Sorel, and Barbara Bach. Its plot follows an American journalist in Prague who is found apparently dead in a park, and charts the disappearance of his girlfriend and his search for her in the days prior.

== Plot ==
In a park in Cold War-era Prague, the corpse of American journalist Gregory Moore is discovered and brought to the local morgue. Gregory is apparently dead, though a mortician observes that his body is unusually warm. Gregory is in fact alive and mentally recounts events from the previous several days while hospital technicians at the morgue contemplate whether to perform an autopsy on him in the surgical theater.

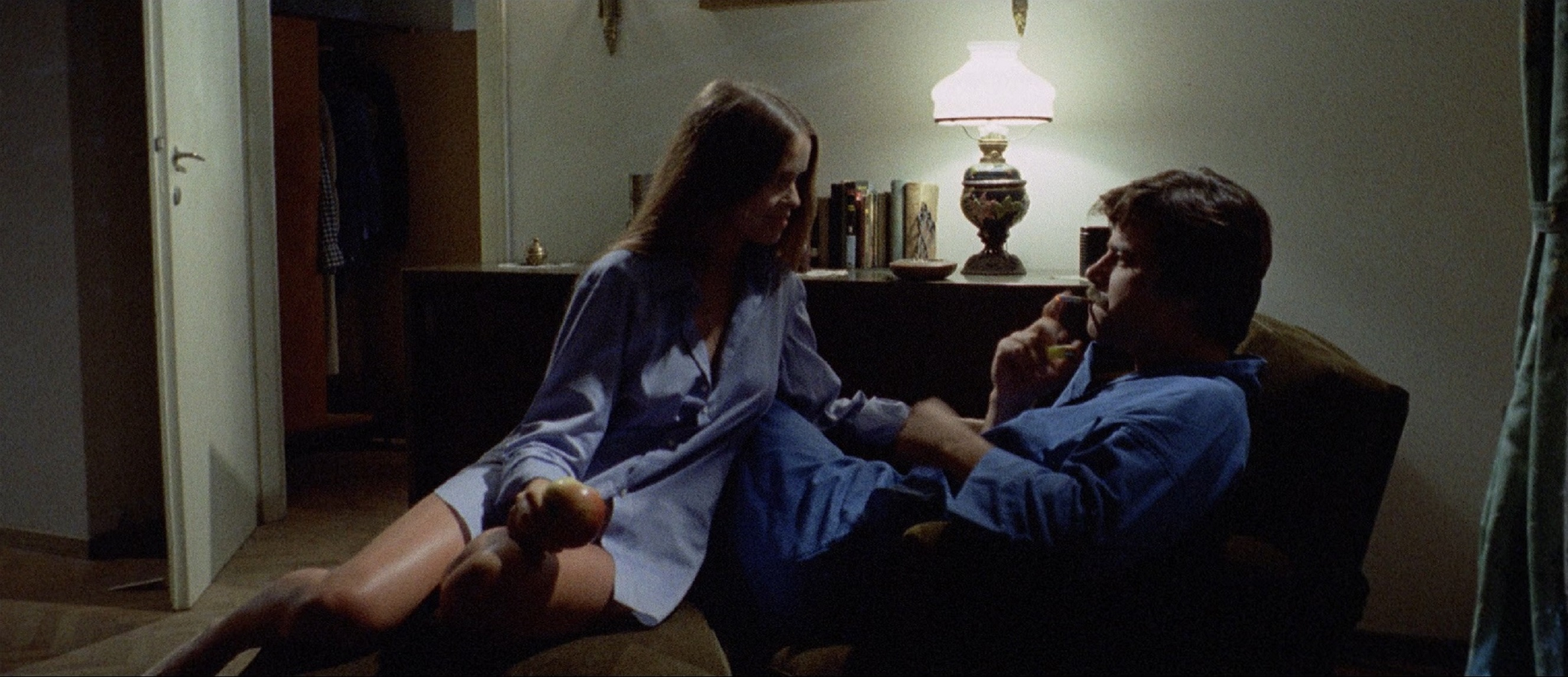
Barbara Bach and Jean Sorel in a scene from the film.

Days prior, Gregory reunited with his girlfriend, Mira Svoboda, who escaped to Prague from the Soviet Union. The two attend a party among other journalists and elites who marvel at her beauty. Jessica, another journalist and one of Gregory's former lovers, attempts to seduce him at the party, but he declines. Later that night, Mira disappears, leaving behind all of her personal belongings. Gregory attempts to seek help from authorities, who are evasive and unhelpful, while various guests at the party claim to have never spoken to Mira. Gregory's peer Jacques, along with Jessica, agrees to help him find Mira, but the group come up against police who threaten them should they continue further independent investigation.

When a woman's body is found, Gregory fears it to be Mira but discovers that it is another woman. Gregory and Jessica visit Professor Karting, a physician whom Mira spoke to at the party. Karting claims Mira told him she was returning to Moscow, which Gregory doubts. Gregory visits the library, where he researches newspaper archives about other missing women in Prague.

Greg receives a notice from a strange elderly man wishing to meet him, claiming he has information about Mira. The two meet at a train station, but a shadowy figure pushes the old man in front of an oncoming train to his death before fleeing. Gregory finds a matchbook among the old man's scattered belongings which reads "Klub 99". Gregory traces the club to an ornate but anonymous musical recital hall and discovers a room full of antiques and butterfly collections. A janitor attacks Gregory, who flees, preventing him from discovering Mira's body in a room full of flowers.

Later, Jacques phones to tell Gregory that he has learned that Klub 99 are international and likely practice black magic. Jacques is killed before Gregory can rendezvous with him. While watching a busker, Gregory is thrown off a bridge into the river. Gregory is interrogated by police who allege he murdered Mira. Gregory's friend Valinski, a Minister of the Interior, offers to take him home from the station. Valinski reveals he is the leader of Klub 99. In his apartment, Gregory finds Mira's body in the refrigerator. He flees back to Klub 99, where he encounters an occult ritual led by Valinski. The cultists attack Gregory, effectively paralyzing him with a spell before dumping his body in the park.

In the present, Professor Karting—a high priest in Klub 99—proceeds to perform an autopsy on Gregory in the operating theater for his medical students, which Jessica has also chosen to attend. Gregory musters the strength to lift his hand, hoping it will be noticed by the students and save him, but Karting holds down his hand, blocking it from view, before plunging a scalpel into Gregory's heart, killing him. As Karting drives the scalpel into Gregory's chest, Jessica screams.

== Cast ==
- Ingrid Thulin as Jessica
- Jean Sorel as Gregory Moore
- Mario Adorf as Jacques Versain
- Barbara Bach as Mira Svoboda
- Fabijan Šovagović as Professor Karting
- José Quaglio as Valinski
- Relja Bašić as Ivan
- Piero Vida as Kommissar Kierkoff
- Daniele Dublino as Doctor

== Production ==
The original story for the film took place in Sardinia with a story Aldo Lado described as being a story about Sicily and the mafia. Following the events of the Prague Spring, Lado was sent to Prague to scout locations for a production which never got made. The film was influenced by Lado's time in Prague, and went through various drafts, one titled Le Notti di Malastrana involved screenwriter Ernesto Gastaldi. Lado maintained that the screenwriter who put the final script into form was Sergio Bazzini, who is not mentioned in the credits.

The script went through several directors initially. First was Maurizio Lucidi, followed by Lado who initially turned down the offer to direct. The script then was given to Antonio Margheriti who tried to produce the film, and have Lado shoot the film in Greece. The film then moved on to producer Enzo Doria who got Lado to direct. Lado initially wanted to have the film as an Italian and Czech co-production shot in Prague. Lado had to fall back on Yugoslavian funding, shooting nearly the entire film in Zagreb, Ljubljana, with indoor scenes shot in Rome. He did eventually get to have three days of shooting in Prague with Barbara Bach. The film took five weeks to shoot in total.

== Release ==
Short Night of Glass Dolls was released in Italy on 28 October 1971 and in West Germany on 30 May 1972.

=== Home media ===
In 2002, Anchor Bay Entertainment released the film as part of a four-film DVD set alongside The Bloodstained Shadow, Who Saw Her Die?, and The Case of the Bloody Iris. The film was released on DVD by Blue Underground on 26 February 2008. Twilight Time issued a Blu-ray edition on 16 October 2018.

Celluloid Dreams released a four-disc deluxe limited edition 4K UHD Blu-ray set of the film on 29 April 2025.

== Reception ==
Alison Nastasi of Shock Till You Drop called it "nail-biting" and wrote, "Lado is at his best when Short Night of Glass Dolls confronts political and social unrest with nuanced symbolism." Noel Murray of The A.V. Club wrote, "Short Night presages Eyes Wide Shut in its account of a man wandering through a shadow city while uncovering layers of sleaze, and the film's simple social metaphor, imaginative setpieces, and unsettling finale make it a prime example of diverting suspense." Maitland McDonagh of TV Guide rated it 3/5 stars and called the ending "a genuine shocker". AllMovie praised the film's use of tension as opposed to the gore and violence common to the subgenre.

== Sources ==
- Curti, Roberto (2022). Italian Giallo in Film and Television. McFarland. ISBN 978-1-4766-8248-8.
