= The Last Day of School Before Christmas =

- Directed by: Gian Vittorio Baldi
- Written by: Gian Vittorio Baldi
- Starring: Macha Méril; Lino Capolicchio; John Steiner
- Cinematography: Emilio Bestetti
- Edited by: Gian Vittorio Baldi
- Release date: 1975
- Language: Italian

The Last Day of School Before Christmas (Italian: L'ultimo giorno di scuola prima delle vacanze di Natale) is a 1975 drama film written and directed by Gian Vittorio Baldi. It was screened at the 1975 Cannes Film Festival in the Directors' Fortnight section.

== Cast ==
- Macha Méril as Egle
- Lino Capolicchio as Erasmo
- John Steiner as The Lieutenant
- Luca Bonicalzi as Athos
- Delia Boccardo as Germana
- Riccardo Cucciolla as Ambro
- Lidia Biondi as Prostitute
- Laura Betti as Passenger
- Giovanella Grifeo as Girl of Remembrance
- Lou Castel as Partisan

== See also ==
- List of Christmas films
