= Woman Buried Alive =

- Directed by: Aldo Lado
- Written by: Aldo Lado; Claudio Masenza; Antonio Troisio
- Starring: Agostina Belli
- Cinematography: Mario Vulpiani
- Edited by: Alberto Gallitti
- Music by: Ennio Morricone
- Release date: 29 September 1973
- Country: Italy
- Language: Italian

Sepolta viva (internationally released as Woman Buried Alive) is a 1973 Italian drama film directed by Aldo Lado. The film obtained a great commercial success and launched a short-living revival of "feuilleton films". It has a sequel, Il figlio della sepolta viva.

== Cast ==
- Agostina Belli: Christine
- Maurizio Bonuglia: Ferdinand
- Fred Robsahm: Philippe
- Dominique Darel: Dominique de Fontenoy
- Laura Betti: Giovanna la pazza
- José Quaglio: Morel
- Francis Perrin: Gael
