= A Married Woman =

- French poster
- Directed by: Jean-Luc Godard
- Written by: Jean-Luc Godard
- Starring: Macha Méril
- Cinematography: Raoul Coutard
- Edited by: Andrée Choty; Françoise Collin; Agnès Guillemot; Gérard Pollicand
- Distributed by: Columbia Films S.A.
- Release date: 4 December 1964
- Running time: 94 minutes
- Country: France
- Language: French

A Married Woman (French: Une femme mariée) is a 1964 French drama film directed by Jean-Luc Godard, his eighth feature film.

== Plot ==
Charlotte is a woman in her twenties, married to Pierre, an affluent man in his later thirties or forties. Pierre's passion is flying, and he flies his own private plane, after previously having been an air force pilot. Pierre has a young son, Nicolas, from his first marriage, which dissolved when his wife left him for another man. Pierre, Charlotte, and Nicolas live together in a modern apartment outside Paris. Charlotte spends her days going to cafes, shopping, swimming, at the cinema, reading women's fashion magazines, or with her lover, Robert, an actor. Pierre believes that Charlotte's affair is over, having previously confronted her with evidence from a private investigator.

As the film opens, Charlotte and Robert are in a Paris love nest that Robert has rented. They have sex, and he repeats an earlier request that Charlotte divorce Pierre to marry him. Leaving the apartment, Robert drives Charlotte to the department store Printemps, where she says she is going to buy new bras. (Indeed, the film is permeated by shots of advertisements for bras and Charlotte's monologues or dialogues about breast size and body image.) However, instead of shopping, she cuts through the store and Charlotte takes a series of taxis to avoid a private investigator who she thinks is still following her, and she goes to collect her stepson from school. They go to an airport to collect Pierre and his colleague, the filmmaker Roger Leenhardt, who have returned from Germany in Pierre's private plane. While in Germany, Pierre and Roger attended sessions of the Frankfurt Auschwitz Trials, and both men have an interest in the Holocaust. They go back to the couple's apartment for dinner. After dinner they discuss the Holocaust and move to the question of memory and one's relationship to the past and present. After Roger's departure, Charlotte and Pierre play-fight and have sex.

The next morning, the maid tells Charlotte a story of a ribald sex session with her own husband. For this narrative, Godard borrowed from Louis-Ferdinand Céline's Death on Credit, which he acknowledges indirectly in the film. Charlotte then attends a fashion photo-shoot at a swimming pool and eavesdrops at a nearby café as two teenage girls discuss their love lives and first sexual encounters.

Charlotte goes to the doctor and learns that she is pregnant. She does not know which man is the father and asks the doctor about contraception, leading to a discussion of the relationship between love, sexual pleasure, and conception.

Charlotte then goes to Orly Airport for an assignation with Robert, as previously arranged, before he has to fly to Marseille to act in a production of Racine's Bérénice. They meet in the back of the airport's cinema, during a screening of Night and Fog, Alain Resnais's documentary about the Holocaust. Partway through the film, they leave the theater separately and rendezvous at the airport hotel to have sex. During their time together, Charlotte questions Robert about love. They hold hands on the mattress of the bed, echoing the opening shots of the movie. As Robert prepares to leave, they both say – one after the other – C'est fini ("It's over."). Fin ('End') appears on screen.

== Cast ==
- Macha Méril : Charlotte
- Bernard Noël : Robert, the lover
- Philippe Leroy : Pierre, the husband
- Roger Leenhardt : Pierre's friend, the filmmaker
- Rita Maiden : The maid
- Margaret Le-Van : a woman at the swimming pool
- Véronique Duval : another woman at the pool
- Christophe Bourseiller : Nicolas
- André Lesourd : "Dédé" the mechanic at the airport

== Background ==
Whilst in Cannes in May 1964 Godard met Luigi Chiarini, the director of the 1964 Venice Film Festival, and offered to make a film that would be completed in three months in time to premiere at Venice – the festival would run from August 27 to September 10. The film would be the story of a woman, her husband, and her lover, and the woman would find out that she is pregnant and not know whose child it is. The situation was mirrored to a great extent in François Truffaut's La Peau Douce, a film Godard admired, that had been based on the story of Truffaut's own infidelity. Godard wrote to Truffaut telling him he would take his film in a different direction if he thought his project too similar. Yet while Truffaut's film was a 'compact, classical melodrama' Godard's would be 'an explicitly and stringently modernist film', the melodrama subordinated 'to a surprisingly abstract style of filming'. Having liked André Cayatte's pair of films, Anatomy of a Marriage: My Days with Jean-Marc/Anatomy of a Marriage: My Days with Françoise – L'Amour conjugale, 1963, Godard chose Macha Méril, an actress who had featured in both in a supporting role, to play Charlotte.

== Censorship ==
The Married Woman – Godard's original title for his film – was shown at the Venice Film Festival on 8 September 1964. It was well received. Michelangelo Antonioni, whose first colour film Red Desert was also being shown in competition, went up to Godard after the screening and congratulated him. And it was praised by French critics. Cahiers du cinéma, which had not praised Bande à part, greeted The Married Woman as a major artistic and intellectual work. In September however, the Commission de Controle (the censorship board) voted 13-5, with two abstentions, to ban the film. Objections centered on the title, which the board said implied all married women were adulterous, and on the film's devotion 'to the salacious illustration of scenes of sexuality.' The commission's reasons were not made public but were relayed to the minister of information, Alain Peyrefitte. He agreed to meet Godard and months of debate and negotiation followed. Godard believed the real problem was political and that 'The people of the commission have sensed that my film attacks a certain mode of life, that of air conditioning, of the prefabricated, of advertising'. Ultimately, Godard made a few changes, including the title, though he refused to remove references to concentration camp inmates that Peyrefitte had wanted. Monokini footage shot by Jacques Rozier had been in the film, but it was edited out by the censors. The film was released on December 5.

== Music ==
The credits are accompanied by a Beethoven string quartet – one of five that are heard in the course of the film. "Quand le film est triste", sung by Sylvie Vartan, accompanies a montage of magazine advertising images.

The Ludwig van Beethoven excerpt heard over the credits and elsewhere in the film is the opening of the second movement of the String Quartet no 9 Op 59/3. An instrumental version of Claude Nougaro's song 'Le Jazz et la Java', its melody partly adapted from Joseph Haydn. underscores the maid's monologue.

== Reception ==
On review aggregator website Rotten Tomatoes the film has an approval rating of 85% based on 20 critics, with an average rating of 7.9/10.
