= Scirocco (film) =

- Directed by: Aldo Lado
- Written by: Aldo Lado; Fiorenzo Senese
- Starring: Fiona Gélin
- Cinematography: Ramón F. Suárez
- Music by: Pino Donaggio
- Release date: 12 August 1987
- Running time: 88 minutes
- Countries: France; Italy
- Language: French

Scirocco, also known as Amantide – Scirocco and with the international title Sahara Heat, is a 1987 French-Italian drama film directed by Aldo Lado and starring Fiona Gélin.

== Plot ==
Léa is married to engineer Alfredo who works at oil wells in the Maghreb. She visits her husband and finds that their marriage is deteriorating. She seeks relief in the exoticism the country offers and she is soon attracted to a local thug nicknamed Le Serpent she meets in the kasbah. However, her relationship with him starts to become increasingly exploitative.

== Cast ==
- Fiona Gélin as Léa
- Enzo De Caro as Alfredo
- Yves Collignon as Le Serpent (The Snake)
- Joshua McDonald as Jeff
- Gianluigi Ghione as Stefan
- Christophe Ratendra as Hotel groom
- Alberto Canova as Kurt
- Abdellatif Hamrouni as Old Arab man
- Nadia Saiji as Gitana

== Production ==
Fiona Gélin tells of her ordeal during the shooting of this film: "In fact, there were nude scenes that were hidden from me and that I had to play. The result was on the verge of an erotic film. I felt betrayed, completely disoriented and I broke down. I was ashamed of myself. This led to a depression and a month in a psychiatric hospital."
