= Dayle Haddon =

Canadian dancer, model, actress (1948–2024)

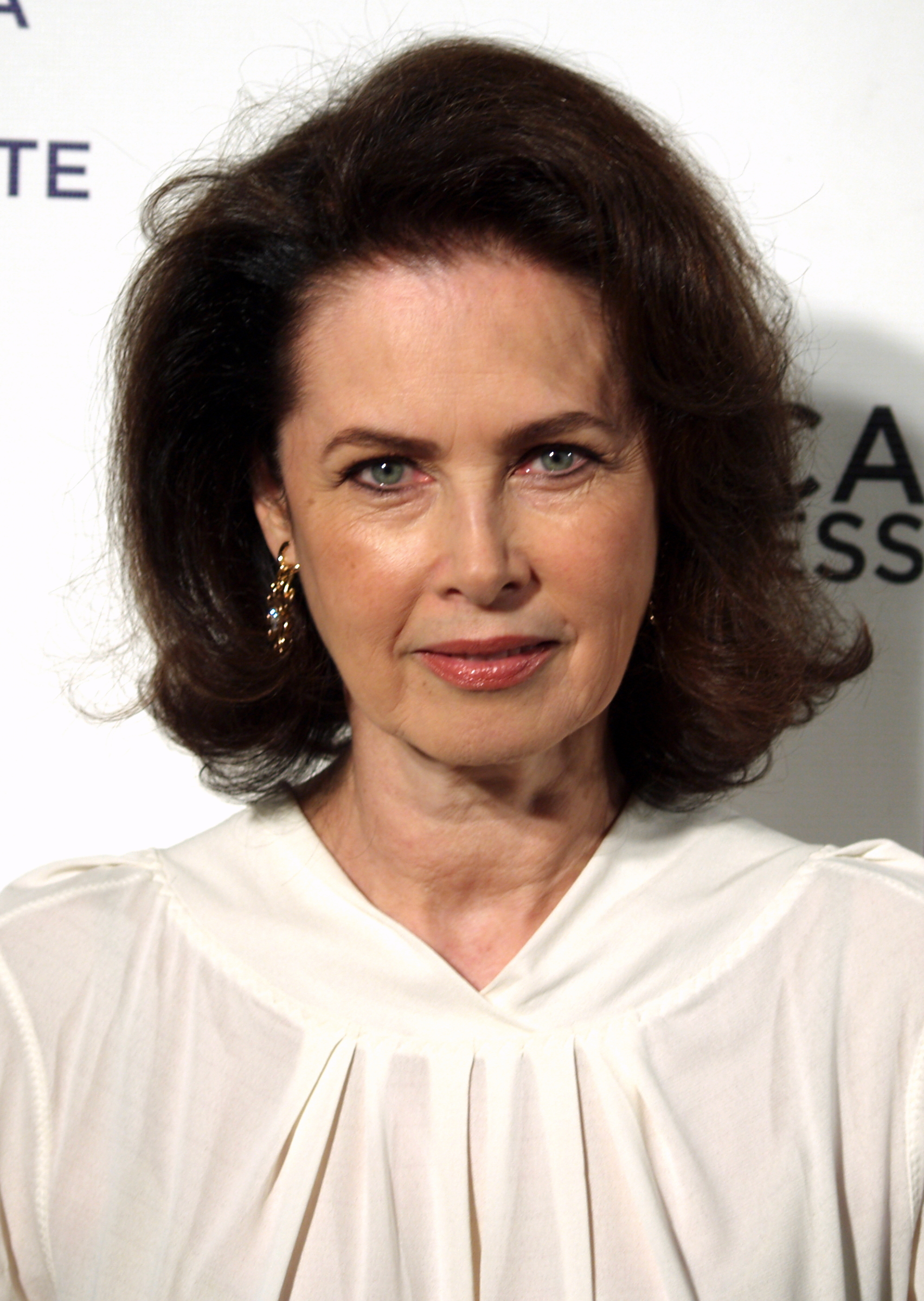
- Haddon in 2008
- Born: May 26, 1948; Montreal, Quebec, Canada
- Died: December 27, 2024 (aged 76); Solebury Township, Pennsylvania, U.S.
- Occupations: Model; actress
- Spouse: Glenn Souham (d. 1986)
- Children: 1
- Relatives: Christian Slater (former-son-in-law); Marc Blucas (son-in-law)
- Modeling information
- Height: 5 ft 7 in (1.70 m)
- Hair color: Brown
- Eye color: Green
- Agency: Bryan Bantry; Storm Model Management

Signature
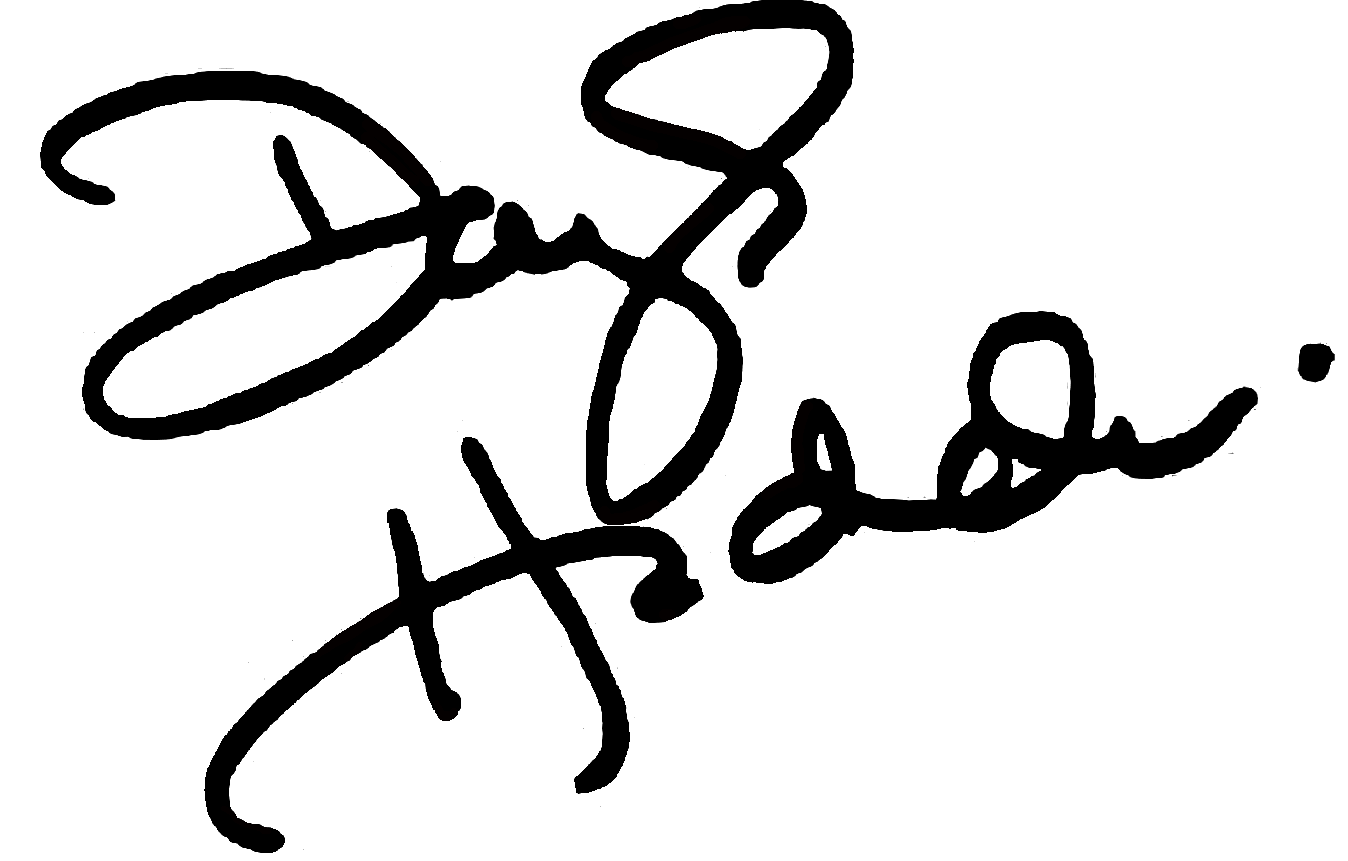

Dayle Haddon (May 26, 1948 – December 27, 2024) was a Canadian model and actress, known for promoting anti-aging products manufactured by L'Oréal. Additionally, she was credited as the author of Ageless Beauty: A Woman's Guide to Lifelong Beauty and Well-Being. During the earlier part of her career as a model, Haddon appeared on the covers of many top fashion and beauty magazines, as well as the cover of the Sports Illustrated Swimsuit Issue in 1973. Haddon also served as a wellness contributor to CBS News where she appeared regularly on The Early Show at the turn of the 21st century. Haddon married French businessman Glenn Souham, who was murdered because of his believed connections to the Iran-Contra affair. They had one daughter, journalist and producer Ryan Haddon. Haddon died at her daughter's property due to carbon monoxide poisoning in December 2024.

== Early life and career ==
Dayle Pauline Haddon was born on May 26, 1948, to Eileen and Edward Haddon. She was born and raised in Montreal, Quebec, Canada. As a child, she was enrolled in dancing classes to develop her physique, and she performed well enough to become a member of Les Grands Ballets Canadiens at 13. She started her modelling career partially to help finance her ballet career, as she wanted to study in France.

In January 1966, she had to decide between a career as a professional ballerina or as a model because she was offered a full-time job dancing. She chose to be a model and was modelling in Montreal and Toronto for department stores such as Eaton's and Simpson's when featured in a 3 June 1966 Montreal Star article. After the Star article got her noticed by Eileen Ford, she was contracted to the Ford Modeling Agency in July 1966. She began modelling in New York City at this time, and made the cover of Seventeen Magazine.

She competed in the Miss Montreal pageant and won at age 18 on 25 October 1966. She competed in the Miss Canada pageant in early November 1966, but finished as the fourth runner-up.

External image
- Haddon's Sports Illustrated Swimsuit Issue cover from January 29, 1973

=== Modelling career 1970s – 1980s ===
As a model in the 1970s and 1980s, Haddon represented Max Factor, Revlon, and Estée Lauder. She appeared on the cover of the Sports Illustrated Swimsuit Issue in 1973 (January 29). She was twice named to Harper's Bazaar's "Ten Most Beautiful Women" list. She also appeared nude in the April 1973 issue of Playboy.

=== Acting career ===
Haddon worked as an actress, appearing in the Disney movie The World's Greatest Athlete (1973) with Jan-Michael Vincent. She moved to Europe, continued modeling and acting, and appeared in a number of film roles in French and English. Her best known roles were in Madame Claude (1977), and North Dallas Forty (1979) opposite actor Nick Nolte.

Haddon was originally cast for the role of Dale Arden in the 1980 film version of Flash Gordon, but producer Dino De Laurentiis replaced her with Melody Anderson just before filming commenced. She took a hiatus from acting in the mid-1980s and returned to the industry when she took the lead role in Cyborg (1989).

=== Later modelling career and writer ===
After the death of her husband left her in financial trouble, Haddon returned to modelling in her late 30s. She became the main face for L'Oréal's cosmetic products aimed at older women. According to The New York Times, Dayle had "shattered age taboos" with her multiyear contracts with L'Oréal and Estée Lauder, among other companies. She also wrote books about aging gracefully, including Ageless Beauty, A Woman's Guide to Lifelong Beauty and Well-Being in 1999. Haddon also served as a wellness contributor to CBS News where she appeared regularly on The Early Show.

== Personal life ==
Haddon was married to French businessman Glenn Souham, who died on 24 September 1986 in Paris, after he was gunned down, most likely by Soviet agents. (Note: There is conflicting information about when her husband Glenn Souham died. The AP obit cites 1991, however, then says she was 38 when he died. Souham was assassinated as a suspected CIA agent in Paris likely by the KGB in 1986. That wasn’t the only fact wrong in that obituary, as it got her birth place wrong too. Be careful using information from the AP obituary.) In the press reports of the time, he was suspected of being part of Colonel Oliver North's schemes to arm the Contras in Nicaragua, part of what became known as the Iran-Contra Scandal. The family, through a representative, denied that Souham had any dealings with the Polish trade union Solidarity or Polish officials that were believed to be part of North’s arms stealing scheme. Haddon was 38 years old when she was widowed, and she never remarried.

Souham and Haddon had a daughter, Ryan Haddon, who works in the television industry. From her first marriage, Ryan had two children with Christian Slater. Ryan remarried in 2009 to actor Marc Blucas and had two daughters with him.

In early 2008 Haddon was named a UNICEF ambassador. She was also the founder of a non-profit called WomenOne. The organization's motto is "changing the world one woman at a time."

Through WomenOne, Haddon had partnered with Free The Children, an international charity, to provide scholarships for girls’ education in Kenya. Through her organization, she had raised and donated more than $150,000 for one of Free The Children's all-girls secondary schools.

Haddon also appeared as the face of a line of socially and environmentally responsible accessories launched by Me to We, Free The Children's partner organization.

=== Death ===
On December 27, 2024, first responders found her unresponsive in a carriage house in Solebury Township, Pennsylvania, which was a property owned by her daughter Ryan and son-in-law Marc Blucas. She was declared dead at the scene, and the cause was determined to be an accidental carbon monoxide poisoning caused by a defective boiler. Haddon was 76.

== Filmography ==
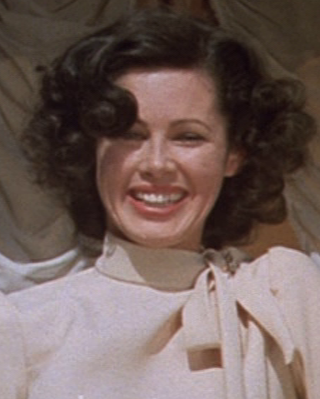
Haddon in the 1974 film The Cousin

- Paperback Hero (1973) .... Joanna
- The World's Greatest Athlete (1973) .... Jane Douglas
- The Cousin (1974) .... Agata
- Gambling City (1975) .... Maria Luisa
- Substitute Teacher (1975) .... Sonia
- Spermula (1976) .... Spermula
- Sex with a Smile (1976) .... Marina (segment "The Bodyguard")
- Madame Claude (1977) .... Elizabeth
- Maschio latino cercasi (1977) .... The Lawyer
- Dernier amant romantique, Le (1978) .... Elisabeth
- North Dallas Forty (1979) .... Charlotte Caulder
- Disneyland aka Disney's Wonderful World
- La Crime (1983) .... Suzy Thomson, alias D'Annunzio
- Paroles et Musique (1984) .... Corinne
- Bedroom Eyes (1984) .... Alex
- The Hitchhiker (1986) TV Episode .... Debby Hunt
- Roses de Matmata, Les (1986) .... Diane Collins
- Max Headroom (1987) TV Episode .... Vanna Smith
- Zwei Frauen (1989) .... Darlene Meyers
- Cyborg (1989) .... Pearl Prophet
- Tropical Gamble (1990) .... Helen
- Unbecoming Age (1992) .... Susan
- Bullets Over Broadway (1994) .... Backstage Well-Wisher
- Fiesta (1995) .... Cecilia Harrington-Forbes
- Tilt-A-Whirl (1995) .... Mother
- Celebrity (1998) .... Waiting Room Patient
