= Ercole Patti =

Italian writer (1903–1976)

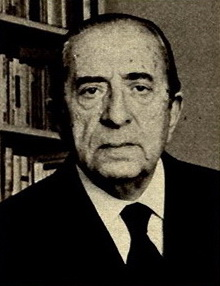
- Born: 16 February 1903; Catania, Sicily, Italy
- Died: 15 November 1976 (aged 73); Rome, Italy
- Occupation: Writer

Ercole Patti (16 February 1903 – 15 November 1976) was an Italian dramatist, journalist, novelist, and screenwriter.

== Biography ==
Born in Catania into an upper-middle-class family and the nephew of writer Giuseppe Villaroel, Patti started working as a journalist at very young age, before graduating in law in 1925.

After practicing for a year in his father's firm, he decided to move to Rome to earn a living from journalism. There, after some sporadic collaborations, he was employed by the newspaper Gazzetta del Popolo, where he was a foreign correspondent in China, India and Japan, among other places.

Patti gained notoriety as a novelist in 1940 with Quartieri alti, a satirical portrait of Roman high classes. His novels are mainly set in Rome or in a sensual Sicily, which was, according to literary critic Carlo Bo, a sort of philosophical ideal for Patti.

He was active as a screenwriter since 1935, and a number of his novels were adapted into films.

In addition to novels, Patti published collections of short stories and two autobiographical works.

== Ercole Patti National Prize ==
The Ercole Patti award was initiated in Italy to recognize those "...who, through art, are able to restore dignity to stories, give voice to pain, and shed light on what too often remains hidden."

== Selected filmography ==
- But It's Nothing Serious (1936)
- A Woman Has Fallen (1941)
- That Splendid November (1969)
- La cugina (1974)

== See also ==
- List of Italian journalists
- List of novelists
- List of people from Rome
- List of people from Sicily
