= That Splendid November =

- Turkish film poster
- Directed by: Mauro Bolognini
- Screenplay by: Lucia Drudi Demby; Antonio Altoviti; Attilio Riccio (as Henry Vaughn)
- Based on: That Splendid November by Ercole Patti
- Produced by: Attilio Ricco
- Starring: Gina Lollobrigida; Gabriele Ferzetti; André Laurence; Paolo Turco
- Cinematography: Armando Nannuzzi
- Edited by: Roberto Perpignani
- Music by: Ennio Morricone
- Production companies: Adelphia Compagnia Cinematografica; Les Productions Artistes Associés
- Distributed by: Dear Film (Italy); United Artists (International)
- Release date: 5 April 1969
- Running time: 92 minutes
- Countries: Italy; France
- Language: Italian

That Splendid November (Italian: Un bellissimo novembre) is a 1969 Italian film directed by Mauro Bolognini. It stars actors Gabriele Ferzetti and Gina Lollobrigida. It is based on a novel with the same name written by Ercole Patti.

== Plot ==
A few days after All Saints' Day a widespread Sicilian clan meets in their country castle near Catania. The younger generation has long recognized that there is a lot of hypocrisy hidden behind the elegant setting and the strict morals. That is why the seventeen-year-old Nino feels particularly drawn to his beautiful aunt Cettina, who is considered the black sheep of the family because she ran off into a marriage that was not entirely approved. The experienced woman, however, smugly kindles the fire of a glowing passion in the awakened young man, seduces him according to all the rules of the art - and then appears very astonished when Nino, full of mad jealousy, does not want to share his place with older lover Sasà. The hope that he had fleetingly hoped that Cettina would be completely committed to himself, contrary to all conventions, vanished. Nino, resigned, throws himself into a marriage with a young cousin - and will play the usual game without open rebellion. At the church door he exchanges a soft "See you soon!" with his attractive aunt.

== Cast ==
- Gina Lollobrigida: Cettina
- André Laurence: Sasà
- Gabriele Ferzetti: Biagio
- Paolo Turco: Nino
- Danielle Godet: Elisa
- Margarita Lozano: Amalia
- Isabella Savona: Giulietta
- Jean Maucorps: Mimì
- Corrado Gaipa: Alfio
