= La disubbidienza =

1981 film

- Directed by: Aldo Lado
- Written by: Barbara Alberti; Aldo Lado; Amedeo Pagani
- Starring: Stefania Sandrelli; Teresa Ann Savoy; Marie-José Nat; Mario Adorf
- Cinematography: Dante Spinotti
- Music by: Ennio Morricone
- Production companies: Gaumont
- Distributed by: Gaumont Italia
- Release date: 1981
- Country: Italy
- Language: Italian

La disubbidienza (Disobedience) is a 1981 Italian drama film directed by Aldo Lado. It is based on the novel of the same name written by Alberto Moravia.

== Plot ==
The adventures of Luca Manzi, a teenager living in Northern Italy during wartime. Luca Manzi is a fourteen-year-old boy when the Fascists govern the Northern Italy Republic of Salò. He becomes a partisan, but when the war ends, he is disappointed because things have not changed as he had hoped they would, and he decides to let himself die. He is saved by Edith, who tries to introduce him to sex.

== Cast ==
- Stefania Sandrelli: Angela
- Teresa Ann Savoy: Edith
- Mario Adorf: Mr. Manzi
- Marie-José Nat: Miss Manzi
- Karl Zinny: Luca Manzi
- Jacques Perrin: Dario
- Marc Porel: Alfio
- Nanni Loy: Professor
- Clara Colosimo
