= José Quaglio =

Italian actor (1926–2007)

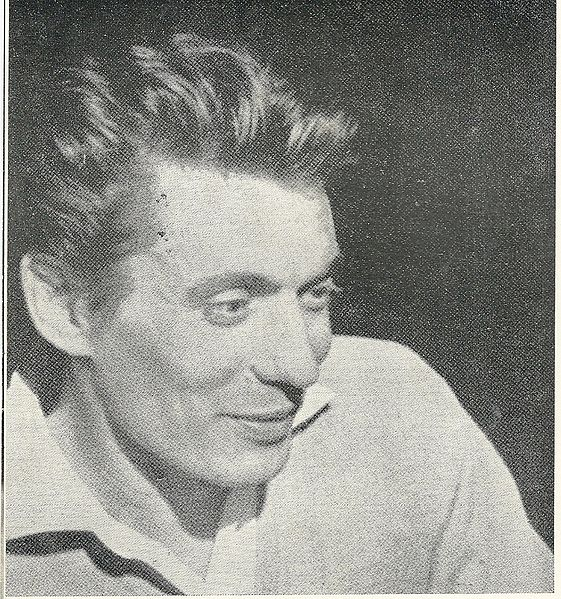
- Quaglio in 1964
- Born: Giuseppe Quaglio; 28 February 1926; Anguillara Veneta (Province of Padua)
- Died: 8 January 2007 (aged 80); Cosne-Cours-sur-Loire
- Occupations: Actor, theater director

José Quaglio (28 February 1926 – 8 January 2007), real name Giuseppe Quaglio, was an Italian actor and theater director. He has performed in some 50 films in Italy and has directed four. He acted in a dozen films in France.

== Filmography ==
=== Actor ===
- 1944 : L'Ange de la nuit, by André Berthomieu
- 1954 : Service Entrance, by Carlo Rim
- 1954 : The Count of Bragelonne, by Fernando Cerchio
- 1955 : Passion de femmes, by Hans Herwig
- 1956 : Blood to the Head, by Gilles Grangier as Mimile Babin
- 1957 : Three Days to Live by Gilles Grangier as an actor in the troupe
- 1960 : Natercia, by Pierre Kast as Claude
- 1962 : Paludi, telefilm by Gilbert Pineau as Carlo
- 1963 : Vice and Virtue, by Roger Vadim
- 1963 : The Terrorist by Gianfranco De Bosio
- 1970 : The Conformist, by Bernardo Bertolucci
- 1970 : Your Hands on My Body by Brunello Rondi as Mario
- 1971 : Short Night of Glass Dolls by Aldo Lado as Valinski
- 1972 : Who Saw Her Die? by Aldo Lado as Nicola Bonaiuti
- 1972 : The Eroticist by Lucio Fulci as Pietro Fornari
- 1973 : Woman Buried Alive by Aldo Lado as Morel
- 1973 : The Assassination of Matteotti by Florestano Vancini as Questor Bertini
- 1973 : Giordano Bruno (film) by Giuliano Montaldo
- 1975 : Mondo candido by Gualtiero Jacopetti and Franco Prosperi as the inquisitor
- 1978 : Nero veneziano by Ugo Liberatore as Father Stefani
- 1992 : Max et Jérémie, by Claire Devers as Eugène Agopian
- 1997 : Les Couleurs du diable, by Alain Jessua as Peter
- 1997 : Homère, la dernière Odyssée, by Fabio Carpi

== Theatre ==
=== Comedian ===
- 1946 : Les Incendiaires by Maurice Clavel, mise en scène Jean Vernier, Théâtre des Noctambules
- 1950 : Henri IV by Luigi Pirandello, mise en scène André Barsacq, Théâtre de l'Atelier
- 1951 : Cymbeline by William Shakespeare, mise en scène Maurice Jacquemont, théâtre National de Bretagne
- 1954 : Colombe by Jean Anouilh, mise en scène André Barsacq, théâtre des Célestins, théâtre de l'Atelier
- 1955 : La Grande Felia by Jean-Pierre Conty, mise en scène Christian-Gérard, théâtre de l'Ambigu
- 1957 : L'Autre Alexandre by Marguerite Liberaki, mise en scène Claude Régy, théâtre de l'Alliance française
- 1958 : Plainte contre inconnu by Georges Neveux, mise en scène José Quaglio, théâtre du Vieux-Colombier

=== Theatre director ===
- 1958 : Plainte contre inconnu by Georges Neveux, théâtre du Vieux-Colombier
- 1958 : Ils ont joué avec des allumettes by Marcelle Routier, théâtre de l'Alliance française
- 1959 : The Killer by Eugène Ionesco, théâtre Récamier
- 1961 : Le Square by Marguerite Duras, théâtre des Mathurins
