= I'll Take Her Like a Father =

1974 film

- Directed by: Alberto Lattuada
- Written by: Bruno Di Geronimo; Ottavio Jemma; Alberto Lattuada
- Starring: Gigi Proietti; Irene Papas; Teresa Ann Savoy
- Cinematography: Lamberto Caimi
- Edited by: Sergio Montanari
- Music by: Fred Bongusto
- Release date: 1974
- Country: Italy
- Language: Italian

I'll Take Her Like a Father (Italian: Le farò da padre, also known as Bambina) is a 1974 Italian comedy film co-written and directed by Alberto Lattuada. It is the debut-title of Teresa Ann Savoy. The film was shot in Apulia.

== Plot ==
The lawyer Mazzacolli (Proietti) wants to get his hands on the properties of a countess (Papas) and, helped by a local nobleman (Scaccia), stages the kidnapping of the countess' mentally-disabled child whose hand he had asked for (Savoy). The move will force the hand of the countess, particularly for granting the usufruct of the property to her future husband. Mazzacolli, however, had not reckoned on falling in love, which unpredictably changes the entire situation.

== Cast ==
- Gigi Proietti as Saverio Mazzacolli
- Irene Papas as Raimonda Spina Tommaselli
- Teresa Ann Savoy as Clotilde
- Mario Scaccia as Don Amilcare de Loyola
- Bruno Cirino as Peppe Colizzi
- Lina Polito as Concettina
- Isa Miranda as Aunt Elisa
- Clelia Matania as Aunt Lorè
- Giancarlo Badessi as Don Liguori
