= Venerdì nero =

1993 film by Aldo Lado

- Directed by: Aldo Lado
- Written by: Aldo Lado; Massimo Felisatti
- Produced by: Maurizio Amati
- Starring: Paolo Calissano; Silvia Cohen
- Music by: Claudio Maioli
- Release date: 1993
- Running time: 90 minutes
- Country: Italy
- Language: Italian

Dark Friday (Italian: Venerdì nero, lit. Black Friday) is a 1993 Italian thriller film directed by Aldo Lado.

The film was shot in just eight weeks in 1991 but, due to the bankruptcy of the distribution company, it hit the big screen only two years later and, in 1994, in the United States.

== Plot ==
Ann and Mary are spending a Friday night with friends at an amusement park when a fight suddenly breaks out. The girls run away and meet two rich young men with a sophisticated woman, who invite them to go with them to a lonely villa by the sea. But their intention is to subject them to a sadistic game: the girls are terrified at the sight of a knife, and they don't know that Ann's boyfriend is desperately looking for them. To defend her friend, Mary loses control and hits one of the two boys, who appears to be dead. The other young man assaults Mary while Ann assists without being able to do anything. The night will end in tragedy.

== Cast ==
- Silvia Cohen
- Paolo Calissano: Gino
- Zoe Scott: Ann
- Mary Dicorato: Mary
- Robert Egon: Luca
