= Rito d'amore =

1989 film by Aldo Lado

- Directed by: Aldo Lado
- Written by: Aldo Lado
- Starring: Larry Huckmann; Beatrice Ring
- Music by: Pino Donaggio
- Release date: 1989
- Running time: 90 minutes
- Country: Italy
- Language: Italian

Rito d'amore (English: Love Ritual) is a 1989 Italian drama film directed by Aldo Lado.

== Plot ==
The young Valerie is a very determined girl: she wants to become an actress and participates in dozens of auditions, almost always without success. To live (she shares a small apartment with her friend Louise) she also agrees to pose naked at the Institute of Fine Arts, where she meets Yuro, an introverted and disturbing Japanese. Valerie, engaged to a musician, slowly lets herself be involved in Yuro's charm, to the point of accepting all conditions. The two end up estranged from the world and live physically and intellectually united, in a relationship bordering on the pathological. Yuro, taking his philosophy of life to the extreme, ends up killing the girl (who is consenting) and eating her flesh: the last desperate rite of love to live with her always.

== Cast ==
- Larry Huckmann: Yuro
- Beatrice Ring: Valerie
- Francesco Casale: Pierre
- Natalia Brizzi: Louise
