= Alberto Lionello =

Italian actor

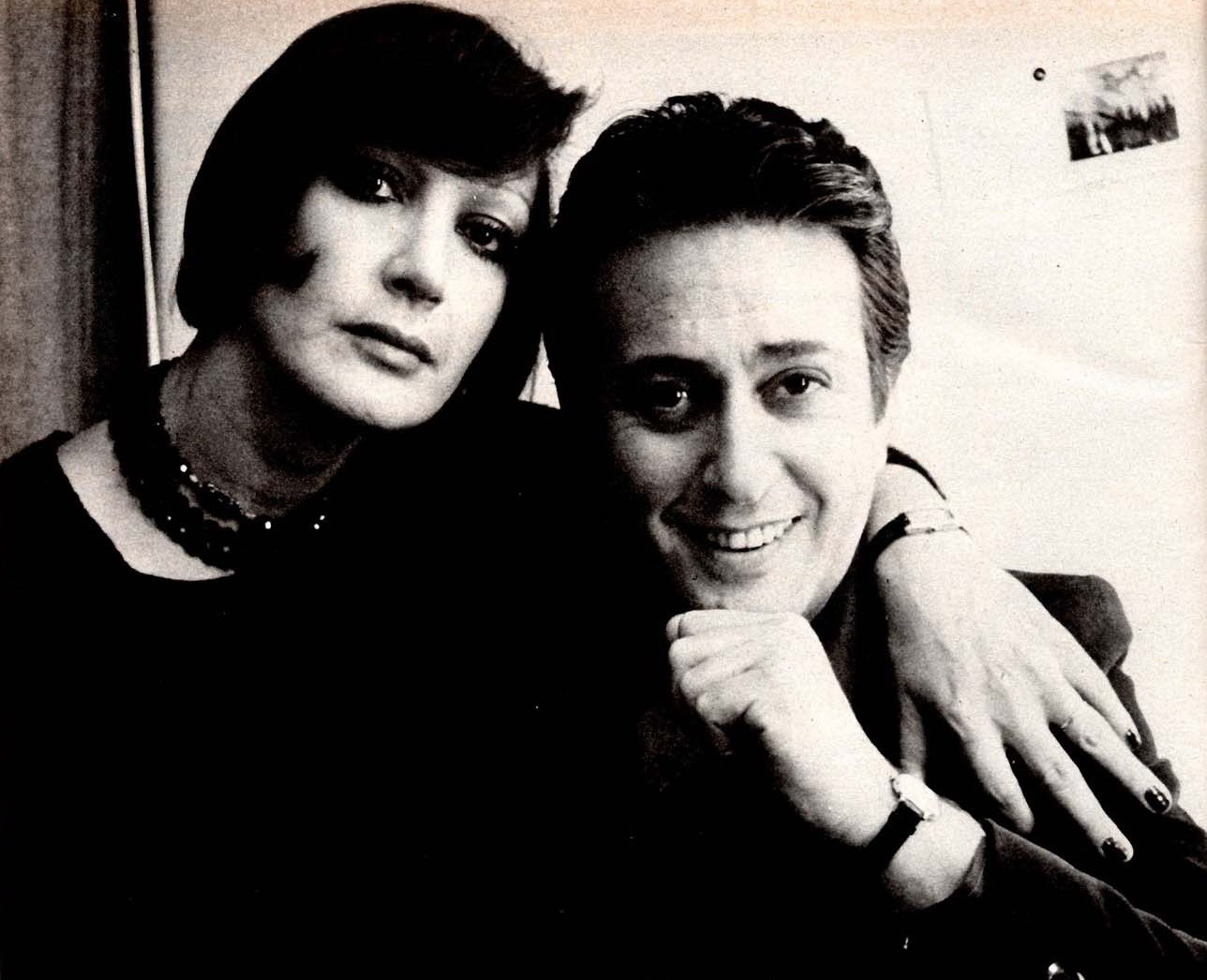
- Lionello (right) with his second wife Gabriella Vannotti in 1975
- Born: 12 July 1930; Milan, Kingdom of Italy
- Died: 14 July 1994 (aged 64); Fregenae, Italy
- Occupations: Actor; voice actor; television presenter
- Years active: 1950–1983
- Height: 1.74 m (5 ft 9 in)
- Spouses: Margaret Axon (m. 1959; died 1962) Gabriella Vanotti (m. 1964; div. 1977)
- Children: 2, including Gea Lionello

Alberto Lionello (12 July 1930 – 14 July 1994) was an Italian actor, voice actor, singer and television presenter.

== Life and career ==
Born in Milan into a family of Venetian origins, after studying acting at the Accademia dei Filodrammatici Lionello started his career in 1949, in the stage company of Antonio Gandusio. He got his first personal success in the stage play La pulce all' orecchio in 1951, then for several years he was part in the Wanda Osiris' stage company.

Lionello had his breakout in 1960 as presenter of the RAI Saturday night musical show Canzonissima together with Lauretta Masiero and Aroldo Tieri. He also performed the opening theme song "La la la", which became a hit ranking 13th on the Italian hit parade. In 1961 he started a 7-years-long collaboration with the Teatro Stabile in Genoa, where he got large critical acclaim, particularly for his performances in Zeno's Conscience, which he later also played in a television adaptation, and in Carlo Goldoni's The Venetian Twins, which he performed in 33 countries including in Broadway.

Lionello had a long relationship, from 1978 until his death, with the actress Erika Blanc. His daughter Gea is also an actress.

== Selected filmography ==
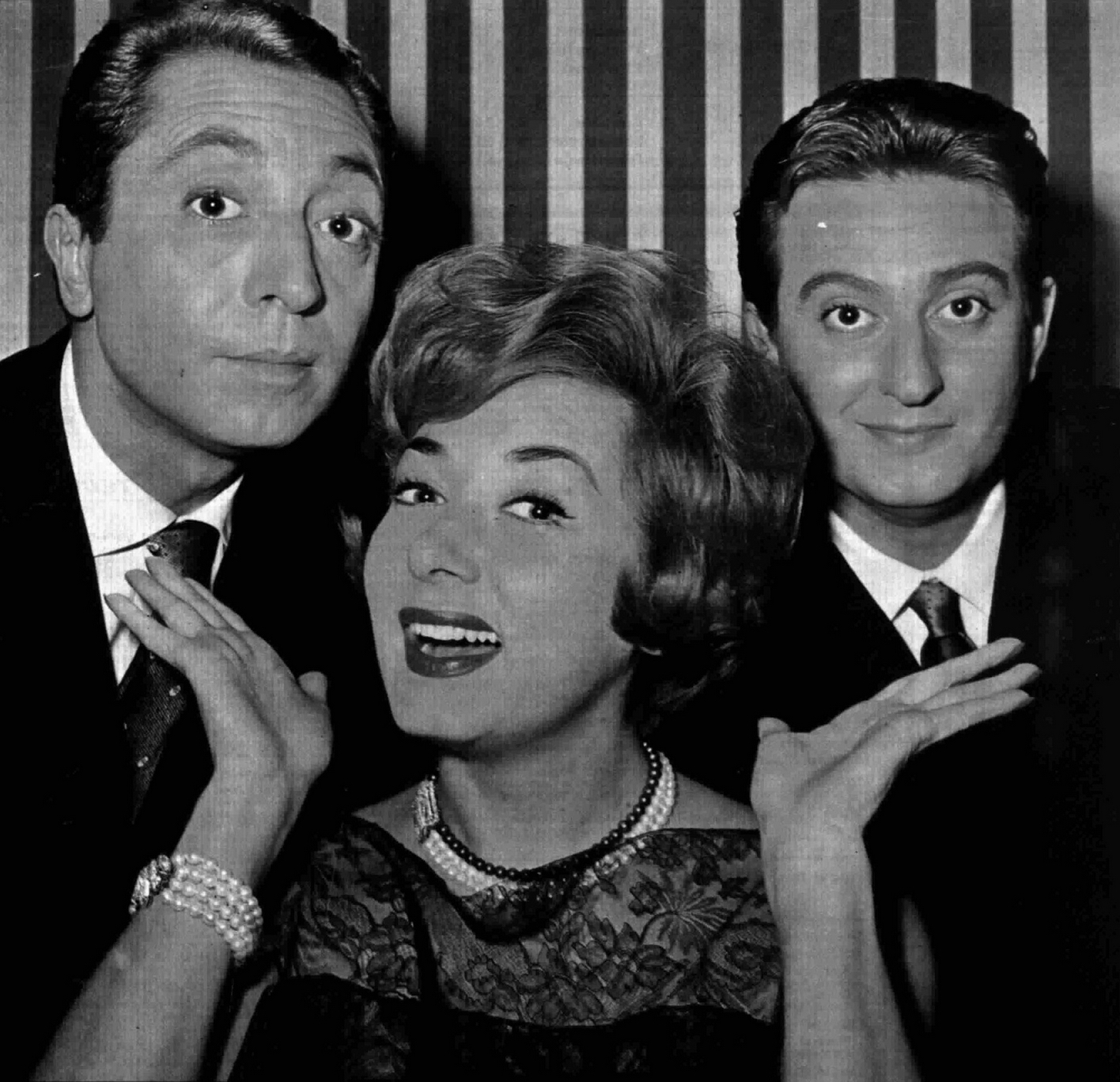
from left to right, Aroldo Tieri, Lauretta Masiero and Lionello, presenters of the 1960 edition of Canzonissima

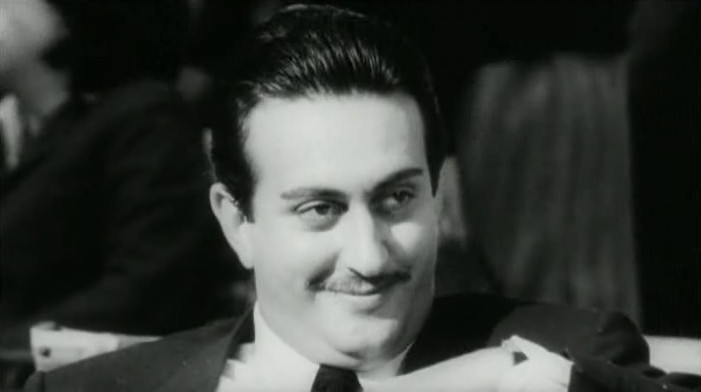
Lionello in The Birds, the Bees and the Italians (1966)

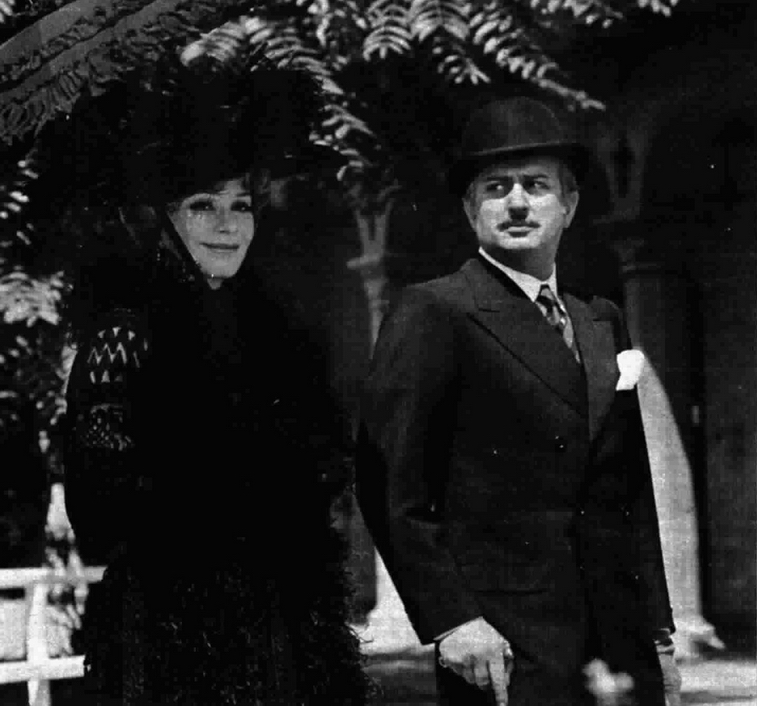
Ingrid Thulin and Alberto Lionello in Puccini (1973)

- Of Life and Love (1956)
- Ricordati di Napoli (1958)
- Mia nonna poliziotto (1958)
- Who Hesitates Is Lost (1960)
- Mariti a congresso (1961)
- Cacciatori di dote (1961)
- Operation Gold Ingot (1962)
- Love in Four Dimensions (1964)
- Una voglia da morire (1965)
- I soldi (1965)
- La coscienza di Zeno (1966)
- The Birds, the Bees and the Italians (1966)
- Oblomov (1966)
- Che notte, ragazzi! (1966)
- Knock o Il trionfo della medicina (1967)
- Colpo di sole (1968)
- Se te lo raccontassi (1968)
- Togli le gambe dal parabrezza (1969)
- Il killer (1969)
- Porcile (1969)
- Diary of a Telephone Operator (1969)
- Orfeo in Paradiso (1971)
- Puccini (1973)
- How Funny Can Sex Be? (1973)
- Till Marriage Do Us Part (1974)
- The Peaceful Age (1974)
- Sex with a Smile (1976)
- Sex with a Smile II (1976)
- L'Italia s'è rotta (1976)
- Al piacere di rivederla (1976)
- The Peaceful Age (1976)
- Policewoman (1976)
- Black Journal (1977)
- The Virgo, the Taurus and the Capricorn (1977)
- Castigo (1977)
- Riavanti... Marsch! (1979)
- Sarto per signora (1979)
- Dream of a Summer Night (1983)
