= Alibi perfetto =

1992 film by Aldo Lado

- Directed by: Aldo Lado
- Written by: Dardano Sacchetti; Aldo Lado
- Starring: Michael Woods; Kay Sandvik
- Cinematography: Luigi Kuveiller
- Edited by: Pietro Bozza
- Music by: Romano Mussolini
- Release date: 1992
- Running time: 95 minutes
- Country: Italy
- Language: Italian

Alibi perfetto (English: The perfect alibi) is a 1992 Italian thriller film directed by Aldo Lado.

== Plot ==
Tony and Lisa, two policemen of the special team, have long been on the trail of Mancini and his men, involved in drug trafficking. Finally, they defeat a large part of the gang by seizing the heroin during a shooting in a Chinese restaurant, but Mancini manages to escape. Elvi, Tony's wife from whom she is separated, asks to settle in his apartment (promising to find him a new accommodation) and in the meantime takes some photos of an abandoned villa for her real estate agency. When Elvi and Tony meet over the divorce lawsuit, the woman is shot and killed.

== Cast ==
- Michael Woods: Tony Giordani
- Kay Sandvik: Lisa Bonetti
- Annie Girardot: Beaumont
- Carla Cassola: Yarno
- Gianna Paola Scaffidi: Elvi Giordani
- Philippe Leroy: police chief
- Burt Young: Mancini

== Production ==
The film was one of the last productions of the film company P.A.C. before its bankruptcy.

== Reception ==
The film was a commercial failure, grossing less than 25 millions lire at the Italian box office. The film was generally badly received by critics. In a contemporary review film critic Stefano Martina described the film structure as "elementary and sketchy". Morando Morandini referred to the film as an "insipid thriller with psychological pretensions and poorly used actors" In his analysis of the film the critic Fabrizio Fogliato was more benevolent, calling it "a decent product (but nothing more)".
