= The Peaceful Age =

- Directed by: Fabio Carpi
- Written by: Fabio Carpi; Luigi Malerba
- Starring: O. E. Hasse
- Cinematography: Luciano Tovoli
- Edited by: Luigia Magrini
- Release date: 1974
- Country: Italy
- Language: Italian

The Peaceful Age (Italian: L'età della pace) is a 1974 Italian drama film written and directed by Fabio Carpi. It was screened in the International Critics' Week at the 1975 Cannes Film Festival.

== Cast ==
- O. E. Hasse as Simone
- Macha Méril as Elsa
- Georges Wilson as "The Other"
- Alberto Lionello as Glauco
- Isa Danieli as Sabina
- Lina Polito as Stiratrice
- Ernesto Colli as Imbianchino
