= Hatchet for the Honeymoon =

1970 film by Mario Bava

- Italian film poster by Ercole Brini
- Italian: Il rosso segno della follia
- Directed by: Mario Bava
- Screenplay by: Santiago Moncada; Mario Bava
- Story by: Santiago Moncada
- Produced by: Manuel Caño; Giuseppe Zaccariello
- Starring: Stephen Forsyth; Dagmar Lassander; Laura Betti; Femi Benussi; Jesús Puente
- Cinematography: Mario Bava
- Edited by: Soledad López
- Music by: Sante Maria Romitelli
- Production companies: Pan Latina Films; Mercury Films; Películas Ibarra y Cía S.A.
- Distributed by: Metro-Goldwyn-Mayer (Italy & Spain)
- Release dates: 2 June 1970 (Italy); 14 September 1970 (Spain)
- Running time: 88 minutes
- Countries: Italy; Spain
- Language: Italian
- Box office: ₤50.499 million

Hatchet for the Honeymoon (Italian: Il rosso segno della follia, lit. 'The Red Sign of Madness') is a 1970 psychological horror giallo film directed by Mario Bava and starring Stephen Forsyth, Dagmar Lassander, Laura Betti, and Femi Benussi. The story follows John Harrington (Forsyth), a hatchet-wielding madman who murders young brides in an effort to recall a childhood trauma.

The film's production was troubled, with tensions among the cast and crew, location difficulties, a major subplot concerning Harrington's relationship with his wife being added solely to accommodate Betti's casting, and a significant hiatus in filming when the budget ran out. It was not released until a year after it was completed, and was largely ignored by both critics and audiences, remaining one of Bava's most obscure films even after his work achieved cult popularity.

== Plot ==
John Harrington is a handsome, 30-year-old man who feels compelled to murder young brides to remember details of a childhood trauma. John lives in a spacious villa outside Paris, where he manages a bridal dress factory belonging to his deceased mother and financially supported by his wife Mildred. He and Mildred are ill-matched, but she refuses to consider his appeals for a divorce. Whenever he hears that one of the models working at the dress factory is to be married, he hacks her to death with a meat cleaver while she is wearing her bridal gown, burns the body in the furnace of his greenhouse, and uses the ashes as fertilizer. Each murder gives him a slightly clearer image of his traumatic memory. Inspector Russell frequently drops by to question John about the six models who have disappeared from his bridal salon, but with a lack of hard evidence, cannot arrest him.

At his office, John meets Helen Wood, who has come to apply for the job "vacated" by one of the mysteriously disappeared models. Impressed by her wit and beauty, John hires her. Over the next few days, John falls in love with Helen. After dropping Mildred off at the airport for a weeklong vacation, he takes Helen out to dinner. He returns to find Mildred at home; she reveals that the vacation was a ruse, and she took the next flight back in hopes of catching him in the act of infidelity. Feeling entrapped by Mildred's constant presence, he dons a wedding gown and hacks her to death with the cleaver. He buries her in the grounds of the greenhouse.

Everyone John speaks to sees Mildred, very much alive, but John cannot see or hear her. He burns Mildred's remains in the furnace and keeps the ashes in a handbag, but she continues to haunt him until he scatters the ashes over a river and discards the handbag. When John attempts to murder another woman, he is foiled by Inspector Russell. His urges thus frustrated, when he returns home to find Helen waiting for him, he cannot repress the desire to murder her as a substitute. He takes Helen to the same concealed room where he murdered most of the models. After convincing her to change into a wedding dress, he tells Helen that he never wanted to hurt her, but wants to "fit this last piece into place." He strikes at Helen with the cleaver. She blocks the blow, but the initial surge finally restores John's memory: as a young boy, upset by his mother's remarrying, he killed her and his stepfather with a cleaver.

Helen lets Inspector Russell and a team of policemen into the room; Russell had convinced her to take part in this sting operation before John had hired her. John is loaded into a police van with two policemen escorting him. One of them sets the handbag with Mildred's ashes down beside John. Mildred appears, this time to John only. She tells him that now they will be together forever, "first in the insane asylum, and then in Hell for all eternity". John goes berserk with terror.

== Cast ==
- Stephen Forsyth as John Harrington
  - Pasquale Fortunato as Young John Harrington
- Dagmar Lassander as Helen Wood
- Laura Betti as Mildred Harrington
- Jesús Puente as Inspector Russell
- Femi Benussi as Alice Norton
- Antonia Mas as Louise
- Luciano Pigozzi as Vences
- Gérard Tichy as Dr. Kalleway
- Verónica Llimerá as Betsy Wester
- José Ignacio Abadal as Jimmy Kane
- Silvia Lienas as Vicky
- Montserrat Riba Vidal as Rosy Miller

== Production ==
=== Development and writing ===
Hatchet for the Honeymoon was initiated by Spanish producer Manuel Caño, who interested director Mario Bava in Santiago Moncada's script. During preproduction, Laura Betti (who had recently won the prestigious Volpi Cup at the 29th Venice International Film Festival for Teorema) telephoned Bava and asked for a role in his next film. Betti explained:

In Italy, I was always considered an intellectual actress. Bava, in my opinion, was a fantastic director, but he was also the opposite, let us say, of an intellectual filmmaker. After my victory - after that consecration - I called Bava and said, "Here it is, my Oscar, my prize, and now I want to shoot something with you!" And he immediately got my joke, do you see? He knew that he wasn't an intellectual, but he had the same ironical point of view, as I do, about intellectuals. So that was the beginning of our friendship. [emphasis in original]

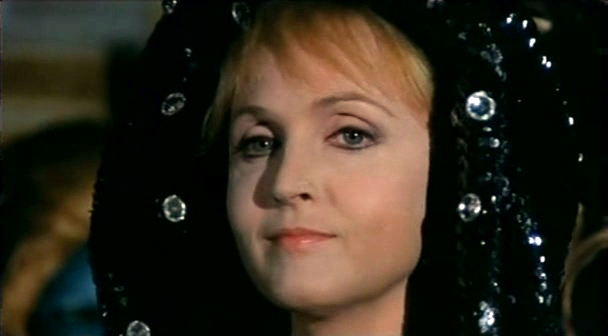
Laura Betti as Mildred Harrington. The character was added to the film in order to give Betti a suitable role to play.

Bava wanted to work with Betti immediately, but Moncada's script had no role remotely suitable for her, so he came up with the subplot involving Mildred Harrington in order to cast her. Having been promised she would be the female lead, and having met the producers' requirement that she lose 25 pounds before filming, Dagmar Lassander was incensed when she saw that the revised script sidelined her character in favor of Betti. This, along with the fact that she was Caño's lover at the time and a language barrier due to her only speaking German and some English, led to her having antagonistic relations with Bava and Betti on set; she later successfully sued Caño for failing in his promise to make her the film's top-billed actress. At least one scene, in which John introduces Helen to Inspector Russell, was added solely to appease Lassander by giving her more screen time.

Hatchet for the Honeymoon had the least money allotted for special effects of any film directed by Bava, so nearly all of the visual effects were achieved in-camera, usually by rapidly adjusting the focus, or shooting through distorted lenses.

=== Filming ===
Principal photography took place from September to October 1968 primarily in Barcelona, under the working title Un'accetta per la luna di miele (literally "A hatchet for the honeymoon"). The villa of Francisco Franco served as the Harrington household. The cast and director both described the villa's atmosphere as oppressive, with armed guards constantly present to ensure they did not shoot on the upstairs floors or damage the furnishings. The discothèque scenes were filmed at Balcazar Studios, also in Barcelona, before the crew moved on to the Villa Frascatti in Rome in order to shoot the scenes at the Harrington household which the restrictions at the Franco villa would not allow them to capture. These include all the scenes in the bathroom, bedroom, and mannequin-filled room.

Caño decided to set the story in Paris, so a second unit led by Bava's assistant director and son Lamberto was sent there to capture some exterior scenes. By this time, the film's budget had run out, and Forsyth had been working without pay for two weeks. He accompanied the crew to Paris, but refused to take part in the shoot until he was paid. As such, he was replaced by a body double for the Paris exteriors, which were shot at a distance to hide his physical differences from Forsyth; virtually none of the Paris sequences were used in the completed film.

With the budget spent, filming was halted and Bava accepted an invitation from Dick Randall to direct Four Times That Night. As that film neared completion, he showed the Hatchet for the Honeymoon script to Four Times That Night's executive producer, Alfredo Leone, in the hope that he would rescue the film, but he was unimpressed with the script. However, in the interim Caño secured the funds needed to finally complete the film. Filming for Hatchet for the Honeymoon ended in October 1969.

Lead actor Stephen Forsyth recalled that Bava did not give him detailed direction on set. When he approached Bava privately, he revealed that Bava "smiled and he said, 'Listen, if you were doing anything wrong, if there was anything I had to tell you, I would tell you.'"

== Release ==
Hatchet for the Honeymoon was released in Italy as Il rosso segno della follia on 2 June 1970 and in Spain as Un hacha para la luna del miel on 14 September 1970, with Metro-Goldwyn-Mayer handling its distribution in these regions. The film was released in the United Kingdom under the title Blood Brides by Tigon British Film Productions in 1973. In the United States, the film was released through GG Productions on 9 February 1974. In all of these countries, excepting Spain, it received a limited release with little marketing support.

== Critical reaction ==
In a contemporary review, Robin Wood reviewed a dubbed 88 minute version of the film titled Blood Brides. Wood noted that the film contained several examples of what Wood described as "Bava's claim to attention [...] he usually photographs as well as directs his films, they are very consciously conceived in terms of potentialities of the camera and as a result are, in a somewhat crude sense, 'cinematic'." Wood went on to state that "the creation of elaborate effects through camera movement, stylized color, focus distortion and the use of varied lenses is, however, no guarantee of quality; and the effects in Blood Brides appear merely self-conscious and self-indulgent."

In a retrospective review, AllMovie called it "not the best of Mario Bava's work", but "a must see for those who love the genre and admire stylish horror films." Tim Lucas, author of the critical biography Mario Bava: All the Colors of the Dark, calls Hatchet For the Honeymoon "Mario Bava's most personal horror movie" and states "Time has shown the film, initially misunderstood and considered one of Bava's lesser works, to be startlingly prescient, pointing the way for Mary Harron's film of Bret Easton Ellis' American Psycho in particular." The film holds a 65% "rotten" rating on Rotten Tomatoes based on six reviews.

== Footnotes ==
=== Sources ===
- Curti, Roberto (2017). Italian Gothic Horror Films, 1970-1979. McFarland. ISBN 978-1476629605.
