= Who Saw Her Die? =

1972 film by Aldo Lado

- Italian film poster
- Italian: Chi l'ha vista morire?
- Directed by: Aldo Lado
- Screenplay by: Massimo D'Avak; Francesco Barilli; Aldo Lado; Rüdiger von Spiehs
- Story by: Massimo D'Avak; Francesco Barilli
- Produced by: Enzo Doria; Dieter Geissler
- Starring: George Lazenby; Anita Strindberg; Adolfo Celi; Dominique Boschero; Peter Chatel
- Cinematography: Franco Di Giacomo
- Edited by: Angelo Curi; Jutta Brandstaedter
- Music by: Ennio Morricone
- Production companies: Doria Film; Roas Produzioni; Dieter Geissler Filmproduktion; Dunhill Cinematografica
- Distributed by: Overseas Film Company (Italy); Cinerama Filmgesellschaft (West Germany)
- Release date: 12 May 1972
- Running time: 94 minutes
- Countries: Italy; West Germany
- Language: Italian

Who Saw Her Die? (Italian: Chi l'ha vista morire?, also released as The Child) is a 1972 giallo film directed and co-written by Aldo Lado, and starring George Lazenby, Anita Strindberg, Adolfo Celi, Dominique Boschero, and Nicoletta Elmi. Lazenby and Strindberg play the parents of a murdered girl, who pursue her black-veiled killer throughout Venice.

== Plot ==
In a French ski resort, a young girl wanders off from her carer and is murdered by a killer in a black veil, who buries her body in the snow. Years later, another young girl, Roberta Serpieri, is found drowned in Venice after being abducted by the same killer. Her divorced parents, sculptor Franco and Elizabeth, attempt to discover what has happened to their daughter.

== Cast ==
- George Lazenby as Franco Serpieri
- Anita Strindberg as Elizabeth Serpieri
- Adolfo Celi as Serafian
- Dominique Boschero as Ginevra Storelli
- Peter Chatel as Filippo Venier ('Philip Vernon' in the English dub)
- Piero Vida as Journalist
- José Quaglio as Bonaluti
- Alessandro Haber as Father James
- Nicoletta Elmi as Roberta Serpieri
- Rosemarie Lindt as Gabriella
- Giovanni Forti Rosselli as Francois Roussel
- Sandro Grinfan as Inspector De Donati
- Georg Willing as Andrea

== Production ==
Who Saw Her Die? was written by Massimo D'Avack, Francesco Barilli, Aldo Lado and Rüdiger von Spiehs; it was directed by Lado. Vittorio De Sisti was the film's second unit director. The film's music was composed by Ennio Morricone, whose score was released separately in 1972.

The film was shot on location in Venice; one of the film's chase scenes was filmed at the Molino Stucky flour mill, a run-down building which was later renovated as a Hilton hotel in 2008.

In both the Italian and English versions, Lazenby's voice is dubbed by other actors. Italian films of the time were rarely shot with usable sound and were dubbed in post-production. For the English version, Lazenby was dubbed by American actor Michael Forest.

== Release and reception ==
In his book Italian Horror Film Directors, Louis Paul has described Lazenby's performance as one of the actor's best, although he regretted that some dubs of the film did not use Lazenby's voice.

Danny Shipka, author of Perverse Titillation, compared the film stylistically to Nicolas Roeg's film from the following year, Don't Look Now, which shares a Venetian setting. Shipka noted that Lado avoided the explicit gore and sexual elements usually present in a giallo film, instead focusing on "an aura of uneasiness".

Buzz McClain of AllMovie awarded Who Saw Her Die? three-and-a-half stars out of five, highlighting Lazenby's performance and Morricone's score; McClain felt that the film's plot was unnecessarily complicated, but that this was compensated for by its setting and cinematography.

From Sweden, With Love complimented the main actor in 2020: "The film is uncompromisingly brutal in its resolve and George Lazenby is brilliant as the dejected, possibly sociopathic, lead.”

== Footnotes ==
=== References ===
- Paul, Louis (2005). Italian Horror Film Directors. McFarland & Company. ISBN 9780786487493.
- Pigott, Michael (2013). World Film Locations: Venice. Intellect Books. ISBN 978-1841507200.
- Shipka, Danny (2011). Perverse Titillation: The Exploitation Cinema of Italy, Spain and France, 1960–1980 (illustrated ed.). McFarland & Company. ISBN 978-0786448883.
