= Gian Vittorio Baldi =

Italian film producer, director and screenwriter

Gian Vittorio Baldi (30 October 1930 – 23 March 2015) was an Italian film producer, director and screenwriter.

== Life and career ==
Born in Bologna, Emilia-Romagna, Baldi graduated in Social science at the Sapienza University in Rome and then enrolled at the Centro Sperimentale di Cinematografia. He debuted as a director of documentary shorts, and in 1958 he won the Golden Lion for best short film at the Venice Film Festival with Il pianto delle zitelle ("The crying of spinsters"). He directed a number of independent films, generally characterized by social criticism. His film Fuoco! entered the main competition at the 29th Venice International Film Festival, while the film L'ultimo giorno di scuola prima delle vacanze di Natale (aka The Last Day of School Before Christmas) was screened at the 1975 Cannes Film Festival in the Directors' Fortnight section.

Baldi also worked as a producer of art films, producing films by Pier Paolo Pasolini, Robert Bresson, Nelo Risi, Straub-Huillet and Dacia Maraini, among others. A devotee of natural wines, from the 1990s Baldi was active as a winemaker and produced several award-winning wines, notably the Ronchi di Castelluccio.
