= Aldo Lado =

Italian film director and screenwriter (1934–2023)

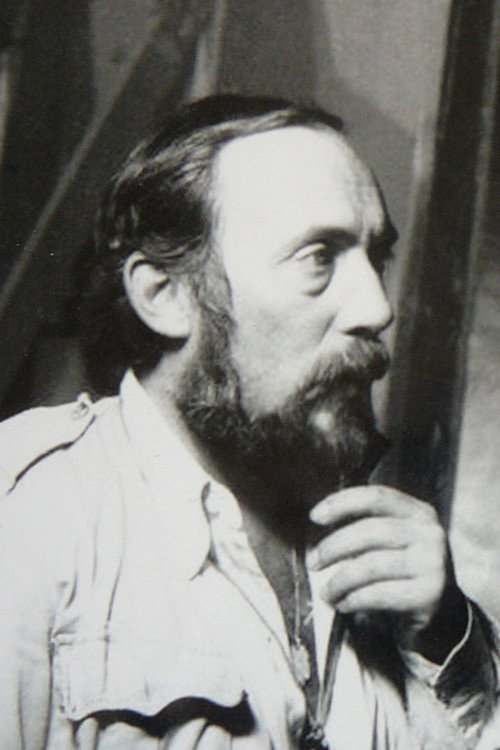
- Aldo Lado in the 1970s
- Born: 5 December 1934; Fiume, Italy (present-day Rijeka, Croatia)
- Died: 25 November 2023 (aged 88); Rome, Italy
- Other name: George B. Lewis
- Occupations: Director; screenwriter; author
- Years active: 1968–2023

Signature
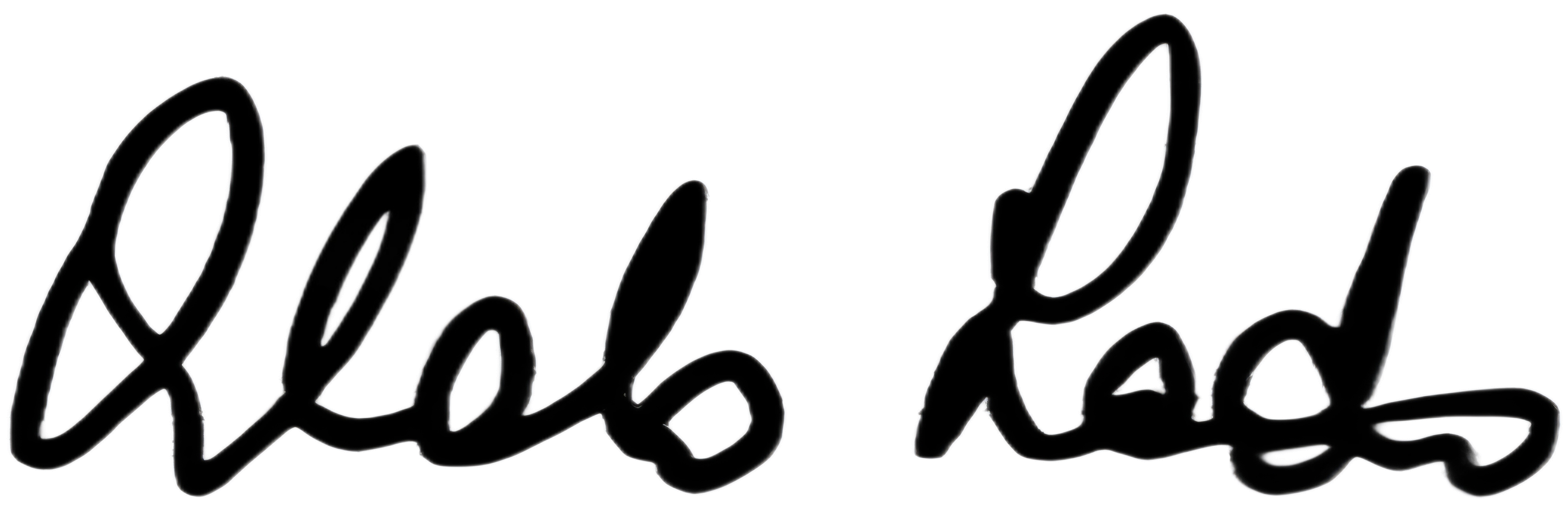

Aldo Lado (5 December 1934 – 25 November 2023) was an Italian film and television director, screenwriter and author. He was known internationally for his contributions to the giallo genre during the 1970s, through his films Short Night of Glass Dolls (1971) and Who Saw Her Die? (1972). Several of his films are considered cult classics.

== Biography ==
Aldo Lado was born in Fiume, Italy (today Rijeka, Croatia) on 5 December 1934.

Lado came up through the film industry as an assistant director, most notably to Bernardo Bertolucci on The Conformist (1970). After writing the story for the 1971 giallo The Designated Victim, he made his directorial debut later that year with Short Night of Glass Dolls. Lado took the job after two previous directors, Maurizio Lucidi and Antonio Margheriti, fell through. The film was a success, and he followed it with another giallo, Who Saw Her Die?.

Lado's subsequent films were made in a variety of genres, including drama (Woman Buried Alive, The Cousin), romance (La cosa buffa), and horror (Last Stop on the Night Train). In 1979, he directed the Star Wars cash-in The Humanoid, for which he was credited under the pseudonym "George B. Lewis". In 1981, he directed the Alberto Moravia adaptation La disubbidienza.

In 2013, after a 20-year hiatus, he directed the film Il Notturno di Chopin.

Lado published his first short story in 2016, in the anthology Nuovi delitti di lago. In 2017, he published I film che non vedrete mai ('The films you will never see'), a compilation based on Lado's own unproduced screenplays.

Lado died at his home in Rome on the morning of 25 November 2023, at the age of 88.

== Legacy and recognition ==
In 2024, Vespertilio Awards founded the Aldo Lado Award. The award is given to the film that best reflects the maestro's ideas and views on cinema.

== Filmography ==
=== Film ===
| Year | Title | Notes |
|---|---|---|
| 1971 | Short Night of Glass Dolls | |
| 1972 | Who Saw Her Die? | |
| 1972 | La cosa buffa | |
| 1973 | Woman Buried Alive | |
| 1974 | The Cousin | |
| 1975 | Last Stop on the Night Train | |
| 1976 | Born Winner | |
| 1979 | The Humanoid | |
| 1981 | La disubbidienza | |
| 1987 | Scirocco | |
| 1989 | Rito d'amore | |
| 1992 | Alibi perfetto | |
| 1993 | Venerdì nero | |
| 1994 | La chance | |
| 2013 | Il Notturno di Chopin | |

=== Television ===
| Year | Title | Notes |
|---|---|---|
| 1978 | Il prigioniero | Television film |
| 1979 | Il était un musicien | 1 episode |
| 1980 | Delitto in Via Teulada | Television film |
| 1982 | La pietra di Marco Polo | |
| 1986 | I figli dell'ispettore | Television film |
| 1991 | La stella del parco | 13 episodes |

== Bibliography ==
- Il gigante e la bambina, in Nuovi delitti di lago, Morellini Editore, 2016, ISBN 978-88-6298-439-3
- Cold Case sul Lago Maggiore, in Delitti di lago, vol. 3, Morellini Editore, 2017, ISBN 978-88-6298-493-5
- I film che non vedrete mai, Angera Films, 2017, ISBN 978-88-942777-0-8
- Un pollo da spennare, Angera Films, 2018, ISBN 978-88-942777-2-2
- Hotel delle cose, Angera Films, 2018, ISBN 978-88-942777-6-0
- Il mastino, Angera Films, 2018, ISBN 978-88-942777-4-6
- Ombre scure sotto la Rocca di Angera, in Delitti di lago, vol. 4, Morellini Editore, 2020, ISBN 978-88-6298-744-8
- Storie di donne: MIRIAM, Edizioni Angerafilm 2020, ISBN 979-12-80098-01-6
- IL RIDER, Edizioni Angerafilm 2020, ISBN 979-12-80098-00-9
- Storie di donne: COSTANZA, Edizioni Angerafilm 2021, ISBN 979-12-80098-02-3
- Il tombarolo in Delitti di Lago 5, Morellini Editore 2021, ISBN 9788862988650
- Il luccio in Delitti di Lago 7, Morellini Editore 2023, ISBN 9791255270782
