= Giorgio Scerbanenco bibliography =

Giorgio Scerbanenco (28 July 1911 – 27 October 1969) was an Italian crime writer.

== Novels ==
Milano Quartet (Duca Lamberti series)

- A Private Venus (Venere privata), Garzanti, 1966
- Traitors to All (Traditori di tutti), Garzanti, 1966
- I ragazzi del massacro, Garzanti, 1968
- I milanesi ammazzano al sabato, Garzanti, 1969

Arthur Jelling series

- Sei giorni di preavviso, Mondadori 1940
- La bambola cieca, Mondadori 1941
- Nessuno è colpevole, Mondadori 1941
- L'antro dei filosofi, Mondadori, 1942
- Il cane che parla, Mondadori 1942
- Lo scandalo dell'osservatorio astronomico, inedito, 1943

Swiss exile works

- Il mestiere di uomo, 1944
- Annalisa e il passaggio a livello, Tecla e Rosellina, C. Scerbanenco, 1944
- Il cavallo venduto, Rizzoli 1963
- Lupa in convento, Garzanti 1999
- Non rimanere soli, 1945
- Luna di miele, Baldini & Castoldi, 1945
- Patria mia, 1945

New Mexico cycle

- Il grande incanto, Rizzoli, 1948
- La mia ragazza di Magdalena, Rizzoli, 1949
- Luna messicana, Rizzoli, 1949
- Innamorati, Rizzoli, 1951

Other novels

- Gli uomini in grigio, 1935
- Il terzo amore, Rizzoli, 1938
- Il paese senza cielo, 1939
- L'amore torna sempre, Sacse, 1941
- Oltre la felicità, Sacse, 1941
- Quattro cuori nel buio, Sacse, 1941
- È passata un'illusione, Sacse, 1941
- Cinema fra le donne, 1942
- Fine del mondo, 1942
- Infedeli innamorati, 1942
- Cinque in bicicletta, Mondadori, 1943
- Il bosco dell'inquietudine, Ultra, 1943
- Si vive bene in due, Mondadori, 1943
- La notte è buia, Mondadori, 1943
- L'isola degli idealisti, Perduto, 1942
- Viaggio in Persia, Perduto, 1942
- Annalisa e il passaggio a livello, 1944; Sellerio 2007
- Ogni donna è ferita, Rizzoli, 1947
- Quando ameremo un angelo, Rizzoli, 1948
- La sposa del falco, Rizzoli, 1949
- Anime senza cielo, Rizzoli, 1950
- I giorni contati, Rizzoli, 1952
- Il fiume verde, Rizzoli, 1952
- Il nostro volo è breve, Rizzoli, 1951
- Amata fino all'alba, Rizzoli, 1953
- Appuntamento a Trieste, Rizzoli, 1953
- Desidero soltanto, Rizzoli 1953
- Uomini e colombe, Rizzoli, 1954
- La mano nuda, Rizzoli, 1954
- Johanna della foresta, Rizzoli, 1955
- Mio adorato nessuno, Rizzoli, 1955
- I diecimila angeli, Rizzoli, 1956
- La ragazza dell'addio, Rizzoli, 1956
- Via dei poveri amori, Rizzoli, 1956
- Cristina che non visse, Rizzoli, 1957
- Elsa e l'ultimo uomo, Rizzoli, 1958
- Il tramonto è domani, Rizzoli, 1958
- Noi due e nient'altro, Rizzoli, 1959
- Viaggio di nozze in grigio, Rizzoli, 1961
- Europa molto amore, Annabella, 1961; Garzanti, 1966
- La sabbia non ricorda, Rizzoli, 1963
- Al mare con la ragazza, Garzanti, 1965
- L'anaconda, La Tribuna, 1967
- Al servizio di chi mi vuole, Longanesi, 1970
- Le principesse di Acapulco, Garzanti, 1970
- Le spie non devono amare, Garzanti, 1971
- Ladro contro assassino, Garzanti, 1971
- Né sempre né mai, Sonzogno, 1974
- Dove il sole non sorge mai, Garzanti, 1975
- Romanzo rosa, Rizzoli, 1985

== Short story collections ==
- Voce di Adrian, Rizzoli, 1956
- Milano calibro 9, Garzanti, 1969
- Il centodelitti, Garzanti, 1970
- I sette peccati capitali e le sette virtù capitali, Rizzoli, 1974
- La notte della tigre, Rizzoli, 1975
- I sette peccati capitali e le sette virtù capitali la notte della tigre, Rizzoli, 1977
- L'ala ferita dell'angelo, Rizzoli, 1976
- La vita in una pagina, Mondadori, 1989
- Il falcone e altri racconti inediti, Frassinelli, 1993
- Il Cinquecentodelitti, Frassinelli, 1994
- Cinque casi per l'investigatore Jelling, Frassinelli, 1995
- Millestorie, Frassinelli, 1996
- Storie dal futuro e dal passato, Frassinelli, 1997
- Basta col cianuro, Cartacanta, 2000
- Uccidere per amore, Sellerio, 2002
- Racconti neri, Garzanti, 2005
- Uomini Ragno, Sellerio, 2006
- Nebbia sul Naviglio e altri racconti gialli e neri, Sellerio, 2011
- Patria mia. Riflessioni e confessioni sull'Italia, Aragno, 2011
