= Slaughter Hotel =

1971 film

- Italian film poster
- Directed by: Fernando Di Leo
- Screenplay by: Fernando Di Leo; Nino Latino
- Story by: Fernando Di Leo; Nino Latino
- Produced by: Tiziano Longo; Armando Novelli
- Starring: Klaus Kinski; Margaret Lee; Rosalba Neri; Jane Garret; John Karlsen; Gioia Desideri; Monica Strebel
- Cinematography: Franco Villa
- Edited by: Amedeo Giomini
- Music by: Silvano Spadaccino
- Production company: Cineproduzioni Daunia 70
- Distributed by: Florida Cinematografica
- Release date: 2 August 1971
- Running time: 96 minutes
- Country: Italy
- Language: Italian
- Budget: 102,850,000 Italian lire
- Box office: 233,433,000 Italian lire

Slaughter Hotel (Italian: La bestia uccide a sangue freddo, lit. 'The beast kills in cold blood') is a 1971 Italian giallo film directed by Fernando Di Leo and starring Klaus Kinski. The film follows a masked killer murdering the wealthy female inmates of a sanitorium.

The film was part of a wave of gialli that came about in Italy following the box office success of Dario Argento's film The Bird with the Crystal Plumage. The film led to a brief trend of thrillers about black-leather gloved wielding killers that featured scenes of overt violence. Slaughter Hotel was the first film made by Cineproduzioni Daunia 70 and was shot on scene and on film sets in Rome. The film received generally negative reviews in Italy and outside of the country.

== Plot ==
A hooded, axe-wielding killer lurks around a large rural villa which has been converted into an asylum. It begins when a woman named Ruth is committed to the clinic by her husband. She attempts to escape by assaulting an orderly as well as attempting suicide, but is restrained. One of the residents, named Cheryl, is visited by her husband, Mr. Hume, who had committed her because of a suicide attempt due to her stressful job working as head of their company. Mr. Hume talks with the clinic director Dr. Francis Clay and his associate, Dr. Austin, about the possibility of Cheryl being cured. Dr. Clay tells Mr. Hume that Cheryl's suicidal urges may relapse once she is released, but Hume thinks that his wife only needs some more rest at the clinic.

Meanwhile, Helen is a nurse who is tending to resident Mara, who tells Nurse Helen that she seems to be improving with her treatment. Another patient is Anne, who is a diagnosed nymphomaniac. Anne attempts to follow the gardener to seduce him, but she is called back to her room by Dr. Austin, who counsels her about her "impulsive" and "excessive" sexual desires. Anne is visited by her brother, Peter, and wants them to return to the 'affectionate' ways they together had as children, and clearly has sexual feelings for him. Peter says they must resist this now they are adults.

Later that evening, as the attendants and patients sit in a room to mingle and play cards and board games, Anne sneaks out the front door and runs to the greenhouse. The hooded and cloaked person is outside, and after a nurse walks by (seeing and ignoring the person), she is beheaded with a scythe.

Anne sees the gardener, takes off all her clothes, approaches him, and seduces him into having sex with her in the greenhouse. Meanwhile, Helen goes to Mara's room and tells her that she can join the others if she wants and says that she will check on her later. Dr. Austin is told that Anne is missing, and the attendants go to find her. After having sex with Anne, the gardener tells her that she must leave for he will suffer the consequences of their tryst. Anne does not want to leave, so the gardener smacks her. Anne hits him back, calmly puts her clothes back on and leaves. She walks over and kisses the male attendants that find her until Austin calls her to stop. Meanwhile, Cheryl asks Dr. Clay if she will be like she was before, and the doctor tells her that she has been cured.

The killer goes back inside the clinic, gets a knife, and unlocks Ruth's door as she sleeps. The killer takes off his hood; Ruth awakens and she goes for the killer with the knife, but she gets knocked aside and the killer then chokes her and stabs her in the chest.

Dr. Austin looks around the hallway with a flashlight and finds Nurse Helen, who says that she heard a noise. A chauffeur enters the building and drinks all of the drinks left over from the get-together. After looking around, the killer shows up and murders the chauffeur by pushing him into an iron-maiden-esque device, and his blood pours out. The killer next walks around with a sword and angrily hits on the bed in Cheryl's empty room. Cheryl meets with Dr. Clay in the hallway and they leave together. Dr. Clay and Cheryl talk of their potential relationship, and he leaves to "do the rounds".

While Nurse Helen enters Mara's room and clearly attempts to seduce her while Mara is taking a bath, the killer walks into Anne's room while she sleeps, shuts her window, and takes off his hood. Anne's eyes open, she sees the killer standing over her bed and asks him to lie down next to her. The killer chooses instead to axe her to a bloody death.

Back in Mara's room, she dances a bit for Helen to a song on the radio. As Mara looks out of her window, the killer fires a crossbow, hitting her in the neck with an arrow, killing her instantly. Helen screams, and a crowd gathers outside her door. Austin and Clay see the dead woman, and Austin tells an attendant not to let anyone in the room. The two doctors and Cheryl look around the building when they find blood on the antique weapons and discover the chauffeur's body. Clay points out that the other sword from the display is missing, and Austin finally calls the police, stating to the police commissioner that the killer is still inside the clinic.

The police and medical attendants remove the bodies of Anne, Ruth, Mara, and the other nurse from the area, but they are angry that Dr. Austin moved some weapons and tried to keep the killings a secret, thus making him an accessory after the fact. The police inspector suggests using Cheryl as bait, and Dr. Clay tries to get her to rethink the idea after she agrees to it.

While all the other clinic patients are moved into a single room for their own protection, Cheryl awaits in her room. The killer approaches with a rope to strangle where he removes his hood... finally revealing himself to be her husband, Hume. The police detectives show up before he can finish strangling Cheryl and chase Hume around the building. Clay and Austin theorize that Cheryl's husband wanted to kill his wife for some time and he created the idea of a maniac spree killer so that no one would suspect him of Cheryl's murder. Hume knocks out two of the cops chasing him and upon running into a room to hide, discovers all of the clinic's female nurses in it. Hume goes on a brutal killing spree, killing every woman in the room before the police run in and finally shoot Hume dead.

== Cast ==
- Klaus Kinski as Dr. Francis Clay
- Margaret Lee as Cheryl Hume
- Rosalba Neri as Anne Palmieri
- Jane Garret as Mara Medina
- John Karlsen as Professor Osterman
- Monica Strebel as Nurse Helen
- Gioia Desideri as Ruth
- Giangiacomo Elia as Gardener (credited as John Ely)
- Fernando Cerulli as Augusto, the chauffeur
- Sandro Rossi as Policeman
- Giulio Baraghini as Policeman
- Ettore Geri as Inspector
- Antonio Radaelli as Policeman
- Carla Mancini as Nurse
- Franco Marletta as Male Nurse
- Piero Nistri as Cheryl's Husband
- Daniela Di Bitonto as Patient
- Enzo Spitaleri as Ruth's Husband
- Marco Mariani as Male Nurse
- Gilberto Galimberti as Policeman
- Rosanna Braida as Patient
- Lina Franchi as Nurse Killed With Scythe (uncredited)

== Production ==
In 1970, Dario Argento's debut film as a director, The Bird with the Crystal Plumage created a new trend in Italian thriller films usually described as the "giallia argentiani" (lit. 'Argento-style gialli' for a few years. These films relied on one or more elements introduced in Argento's first film. These included the prominence of black-gloved killer and an emphasis on violence, often on women. These films would also occasionally have an animals name or a number in the title. In their book on Dio Lio, authors Roberto Curti and Deminico Monetti said that Di Lio breaks from some elements of Argento's gialli avoiding shots from the murderer's point-of-view showing a cloaked, hooded figure lurking on the premise. Di Leo summarized that he "didn't have Dario Argento's talent of believing in the absurd" which led him to putting himself "in a hyperrealistic position."

Di Leo was contacted by his distributor friend Ermanno Curti who asked if he would make a film as part of the trend. Dio Leo agree dand penned a script with Carmine Di Lio (credited as Nino Latino) initially titled La lunga notte dell'assassino (lit. 'The Long Night of the Assassin'. It became the first film made by the company Daunia 70, a company founded on January 20, 1970, by Andrea Maggiore, Nazzareno Chiaretti, and Massimo Di Feliciantonio.

Filming began on January 25, 1971, with a budget of 102,850,000 Italian lire. While Di Leo claimed he shot the film in just two weeks, ministerial papers say filming lasted three weeks, which was still one less than planned. The film was shot in Rome at Villa Chigi in Castel Fusano and at Elios Film Studios.

== Release ==
Slaughter Hotell was distributed in Italy by Florida Cinematographica on August 2, 1971. Curti and Monetti said the film had a "nondescript box office", with 233,433,000 lire in Italy.

The film was distributed theatrically in the United States through American International Pictures's (AIP) Hallmark Releasing first as Aslyum Erotica on July 26, 1972, and then later as Salughter Hotel by December 6, 1972.It was usually shown on double and triple bills with other AIP releases such as A Bay of Blood and Don't Look in the Basement. There is also a version released in France on March 1, 1973, under the title Les insatisfaites poupées érotiques du docteur Hitchcock containing explicit sexual scenes that were cut from the Italian release. It was released in the United Kingdom through Miracle Films in 1972 as Cold-Blooded Beast with a 74-minute running time.

The film was released on DVD by Media Blasters on their sub-label Shriek Show in 2004. It was later released on Blu-ray and DVD by Raro Video in 2014.

== Reception ==
Curti and Monetti described the reception in Italy as "predictably harsh reviews" A reviewer in La Stampa found the film slow and "devoid of any meaning" being both "grim, and pornographic" while also being "fairly good skills, embellished by the colors cope format." A review in L'Unità called out Di Leo for his contribution to "the commercial enrichment of our pornographic cinema... If cinema is the mirror of the times, we should say that sexual repression in Italy is at the top spot of hypothetical global scale." A review in Avanti! called it a "despicable film, a true viral agent of moral pollution."

Outside of Italy, David McGillivray reviewed a dubbed version of the film titled Cold Blooded Beast in the Monthly Film Bulletin. McGillivray found the film to be a "crude and meretricious Italian murder mystery" in which "a great many killings (all clumsily presented without a trace of suspense) are interspersed with regular doses of sex, and the director has an annoying habit of regurgitating a good percentage of the footage each time a character recalls a past event." Paul Vecchiali reviewed the film in La Revue due cinéma, saying that the "stupidity of the script is matched only by the director, who multiplies the bizarre angles and distortions of the image" while Kinski and Margaret Lee struggle in vain to understand their characters.

Reflecting on the film, Di Leo dismissed the film saying as he had "written the script myself, I knew it would not be a good movie, also because I was dealing with topics that were unusual for me and that I didn't care about."

== See also ==
- List of giallo films
- List of Italian films of 1971
