= Tiziano Longo =

Italian film director (1924–1978)

- Born: 24 April 1924; Rimini, Italy
- Died: 10 January 1978 (aged 53)
- Occupation: Film director

Tiziano Longo (24 April 1924 – 10 January 1978) was an Italian film director, screenwriter and producer.

== Life and career ==
Born in Rimini, in 1943 Longo started his career as an actor, appearing in Luis Trenker's Monte Miracolo. Starting from the late 1940s, he focused on film production, founding several production companies and producing films by Fernando Di Leo, Umberto Lenzi, Nello Rossati and Mario Caiano, among others.

In 1964, Longo made his directorial debut with the family film Michelino Cucchiarella. In the 1970s, he specialized in the commedia sexy all'italiana genre. He died on 10 January 1978, at the age of 53.

== Selected filmography ==
Director

- Sixteen (1973)
- La prova d'amore (1974)
- La profanazione (1974)
- Sins in the Country (1976)
- Onore e guapparia (1977)

Producer

- The Playgirls and the Vampire (1960)
- Final Pardon (1952)
- The Triumph of Robin Hood (1962)
- Hawk of the Caribbean (1962)
- Code Name: Red Roses (1968)
- A Woman on Fire (1969)
- A Wrong Way to Love (1969)
- Naked Violence (1969)
- Slaughter Hotel (1971)
- Le notti peccaminose di Pietro l'Aretino (1972)
- La malavita attacca... la polizia risponde! (1977)
