= Duca Lamberti =

Fictional Italian detective

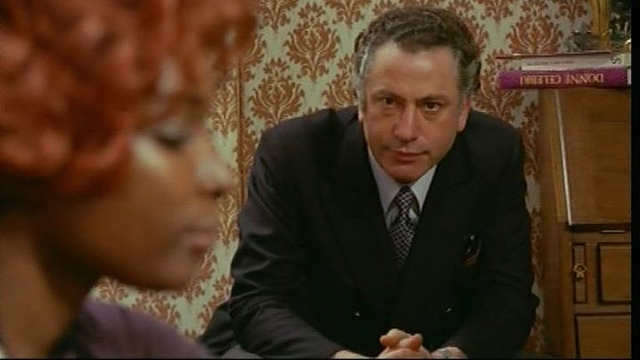
Frank Wolff as Duca Lamberti in the film Death Occurred Last Night (1970)

Duca Lamberti is a fictional character created by the Ukrainian-born Italian writer Giorgio Scerbanenco. Lamberti is a physician turned detective and the main character in Scerbanenco's Milano Quartet of crime novels: A Private Venus (1966), Traitors to All (1966), I ragazzi del massacro (1968) and I milanesi ammazzano al sabato (1969). He has been portrayed on film by Pier Paolo Capponi, Frank Wolff and Bruno Cremer.

== History and description ==
Duca Lamberti is the main character in four crime novels by the Ukrainian-born Italian writer Giorgio Scerbanenco, conventionally known as the Milano Quartet, published from 1966 to 1969. The son of a police officer, he is a former physician who lost his medical licence after having performed euthanasia, and is approached by a colleague of his deceased father to help with a sensitive investigation in Milan. He eventually becomes an official police detective.

Lamberti appears as a guilt-ridden and cynical misfit in the shadow of the Italian economic boom of the 1960s, and was written as a contrast to the shallowness of the mainstream culture of Milan at the time. He has similarities to the typical detectives of American hardboiled fiction, such as alcoholism, despair, cynicism and misogyny, but unlike them is committed to middle-class family life, although his family is unconventional. He contrasts not only to shallow post-war culture, but also to traditional Italian society, through his family which consists of his sister and her illegitimate child, and his girlfriend who is an eccentric philosophy teacher.

== Bibliography ==
- A Private Venus (1966)
- Traitors to All (1966)
- I ragazzi del massacro (1968)
- I milanesi ammazzano al sabato (1969)
- Il ritorno del Duca (2007), short story anthology by various writers, edited by Gian Franco Orsi

== Filmography ==
- Naked Violence (1969), based on I ragazzi del massacro, directed by Fernando Di Leo and starring Pier Paolo Capponi
- Death Occurred Last Night (1970), based on I milanesi ammazzano al sabato, directed by Duccio Tessari and starring Frank Wolff.
- Cran d'arrêt (1970), based on A Private Venus, directed by Yves Boisset and starring Bruno Cremer

== Comics ==
- Venere privata. La prima indagine di Duca Lamberti (2022), based on A Private Venus, by Paolo Bacilieri
- Traditori di tutti (2024), based on Traitors to All, by Paolo Bacilieri
