= I ragazzi del massacro =

1968 novel by Giorgio Scerbanenco

- Author: Giorgio Scerbanenco
- Language: Italian
- Publisher: Garzanti
- Publication date: 1968
- Publication place: Italy
- Pages: 230

I ragazzi del massacro, or The Children of the Massacre, is a 1968 crime novel by the Italian writer Giorgio Scerbanenco. It revolves a murder case where a young Northern Italian woman is found dead and naked in a classroom. It was the third installment in Scerbanenco's Milan Quartet about the medical doctor and investigator Duca Lamberti.

== Publication ==
The novel was published in 1968 through Garzanti in Milan. It has been translated into French, Spanish, German, Dutch and Japanese.

== Film adaptation ==
The novel was the basis for the 1969 Italian film Naked Violence. The film was directed by Fernando Di Leo and stars Pier Paolo Capponi as Lamberti.
