= Date for a Murder =

- Italian: Omicidio per appuntamento
- Directed by: Mino Guerrini
- Written by: Fernando Di Leo; Mino Guerrini
- Based on: (story) "Tempo di massacro" by Franco Enna
- Produced by: Liliana Biancini
- Starring: George Ardisson; Günther Stoll; Ella Karin
- Cinematography: Franco Delli Colli
- Edited by: Franco Fraticelli
- Music by: Ivan Vandor
- Release date: 1966
- Running time: 1:45:00
- Countries: Italy; West Germany
- Language: Italian

Date for a Murder (Italian: Omicidio per appuntamento, lit. "Murder by Appointment") is a 1966 giallo film directed by Mino Guerrini. The film stars George Ardisson, Günther Stoll and Ella Karin. Adapted from a novel by Franco Enna, the film has been described as "stylish" and "flamboyant", and has been seen as inspired by the work of Mario Bava.

The film depicts the investigation of a disappearance by Vince Dreyser (Ardisson), a private detective in Rome who is searching for a vanished friend. Dreyser's investigation leads him into the city's criminal underworld.

== Plot ==
Vince Dreyser (George Ardisson), an American private detective working in Rome, meets with his old friend Walter Dempsey (Hans von Borsody) in the countryside. Several days later, Dempsey has vanished under suspicious circumstances, leading Dreyser to investigate the disappearance. Dempsey was in the country to be married, and the search for his whereabouts leads Dreyser into a web of organised crime, while trying to keep an eye on the hippie daughter of a wealthy client. The detective is beaten and left for dead by two thugs, after which he manages to kill the gangster who disposed of his friend. One sequence features a death scene in which a gangster is shown falling to his death from the roof of a building as the camera follows him down in a point-of-view shot. Vince continues on, trying to find his missing friend.

== Production ==
The film was written and directed by Mino Guerrini. Guerrini had previously worked as a script supervisor on the film La ragazza che sapeva troppo, which has been described as the first giallo film. Guerrini's screenplay, written alongside Fernando Di Leo, was based on the novel Tempo di massacro by Franco Enna; the novel's provincial setting was moved to contemporary Rome and updated with references to then-current eurospy films, particularly Ardisson's films with Sergio Sollima. Guerrini and Di Leo would later collaborate on Gangsters '70, again co-writing the script.

Guerrini also appeared in a cameo role. The film was made in Techniscope and Technicolor; and made significant use of handheld cameras.

== Release and reception ==
The film was released in 1966, and was also distributed under the titles Agent 3S3 setzt alles auf eine Karte (Agent 3S3 Bets it all on One Card), Date for a Murder and Rendezvous met de dood (Rendezvous with the Dead).

Writing for AllMovie, Robert Firsching has described the film as "stylish" and "flamboyant", finding Guerrini's direction to have been influenced by the works of fellow countryman and giallo "pioneer" Mario Bava.

== Footnotes ==
=== References ===
- Chiti, Roberto; Lancia, Enrico; Poppi, Roberto (2003). Dizionario del cinema Italianio: Gli attori, A–L. Gremese Editore. ISBN 8884402131.
- Curti, Roberto (2013). Italian Crime Filmography, 1968–1980. McFarland. ISBN 978-0786469765.
- Lancia, Enrico (2003). Dizionario del cinema Italianio: Le attrici, dal 1930 ai giorni nostri. Gremese Editore. ISBN 888440214X.
- Luther-Smith, Adrian (1999). Blood and Black Lace: The Definitive Guide to Italian Sex and Horror Movies. Stray Cat Publishing Ltd. ISBN 0-9533261-1-X.
- Poppi, Roberto; Pecorari, Mario (1992). Dizionario del cinema italiano: I film vol. 3–Dal 1960 al 1969. Gremese Editore. ISBN 8876055932.
