= A Wrong Way to Love =

- Directed by: Fernando Di Leo
- Screenplay by: Fernando Di Leo; Enzo Dell'Aquila; Carmine Di Leo
- Story by: Fernando Di Leo; Enzo Dell'Aquila; Carmine Di Leo
- Starring: Nieves Navarro; Gianni Macchia; Micaela Pignatelli; Lucio Dalla
- Cinematography: Franco Villa
- Edited by: Amedeo Giomini
- Music by: Silvano Spadaccino
- Production companies: Ferti Film; Italian International; Transeuropa Film
- Distributed by: Italian International Film
- Release date: August 9, 1969 (Riccione)
- Running time: 95 minutes
- Country: Italy

A Wrong Way to Love (Italian: Amarsi male) is a 1969 Italian drama film. It was directed by Fernando Di Leo. It stars Nieves Navarro, Gianni Macchia, Micaela Pignatelli, Lucio Dalla, and Lea Lander.

== Production ==
The female lead actress initially chosen was Lucia Bosè, later replaced by Pier Angeli and ultimately by Nieves Navarro. The singer-songwriter Lucio Dalla was given a comical sidekick role. The male protagonist's surname, Tessari, is a Di Leo's homage to his real life friend Duccio Tessari. The best known actor in the cast, Gary Merrill, has only a supporting role. The film has cameos of Giancarlo Cobelli and Maria Monti, as two small-theater performers. The director Di Leo appears uncredited as a client in a brothel.

== Release and reception ==
The film was first released as Amarsi male on August 9, 1969 in Riccione where it was distributed by Italian International Film.

The film was a box office failure; in 1972 it was re-released under the title Brucia amore brucia, a reference to Di Leo's prior hit, Brucia, ragazzo, brucia, but still failed to be profitable. It was released as A Wrong Way to Love in the United Kingdom.

The film has been generally badly received by critics. Paolo Mereghetti describes it as an attempt to describe the social turmoil of the late 1960s, which falls into "the clichés of melodrama". According to Manlio Gomarasca, the film is a "soulless shell", formally very good, even exceeding Di Leo's previous films, but empty of substance. Gomarasca attributes the failure of the film principally to a lack of courage in its erotic and social aspects, probably a result of the censorship issues Di Leo had suffered with Brucia, ragazzo, brucia.
