= Death Occurred Last Night =

- Directed by: Duccio Tessari
- Screenplay by: Biagio Proietti; Duccio Tessari
- Based on: I milanesi ammazzano al sabato (1969 novel) by Giorgio Scerbanenco
- Produced by: Giuseppe Tortorella; Artur Brauner
- Starring: Raf Vallone; Frank Wolff; Gabriele Tinti; Gillian Bray; Eva Renzi
- Cinematography: Lamberto Caimi
- Edited by: Mario Morra
- Music by: Gianni Ferrio
- Production companies: Lombard Film; Slogan Film; Filmes Cinematografica
- Distributed by: Titanus
- Release dates: 5 September 1970 (Italy); 16 July 1971 (West Germany)
- Running time: 102 minutes (original); 95 minutes (international)
- Countries: Italy; West Germany
- Language: Italian

Death Occurred Last Night (Italian: La morte risale a ieri sera) is a 1970 crime film directed and co-written by Duccio Tessari, starring Raf Vallone and Frank Wolff. It is based on the 1969 novel I milanesi ammazzano al sabato (“The Milanese Kill on Saturdays”) by Giorgio Scerbanenco. The film's baroque, psychedelic-infused score was composed by Gianni Ferrio.

An Italian and West German co-production, the film was released by Titanus on September 5, 1970.

== Plot ==
Following the disappearance of his beautiful but mentally disabled daughter, Avanzio Berzaghi (Raf Vallone) travels to Milan to track her down. Local detective Duca Lamberti (Frank Wolff) investigates the city's pimps and prostitutes for clues, eventually finding the girl's burnt body in a field. The pimps disposed of the young girl when they heard investigators were looking for her. Berzaghi vows to find the girl's murderer, eventually tracking down his quarry from a clue related to the girl's teddy bear. Berzaghi exacts his revenge but finds no satisfaction from having done so.

== Cast ==
- Frank Wolff as Police Inspector Duca Lamberti
- Raf Vallone as Amanzio Berzaghi
- Gabriele Tinti as Mascaranti
- Gillian Bray as Donatella Berzaghi
- Eva Renzi as Agnese Lamberti
- Gigi Rizzi as Salvatore
- Beryl Cunningham as Herrero
- Wilma Casagrande as Concetta Giarzone
- Marco Mariani as Franco Baronia
- Checco Rissone as Salvarsanti
- Riccardo De Stefanis as Mario
- Maria Grazia Bettini as Hildegarde
- Elsa Boni as Erica
- Marisa Cassetta as Giselle
- Jack La Cayenne as The Other Franco Baronia

== Production ==
Death Occurred Last Night was written by Biagio Proietti and director Duccio Tessari. the film is based on Giorgio Scerbanenco's 1969 novel I milanesi ammazzano al sabato (translation: The Milanese Kill on Saturdays). The book was published just a few months before the author's death. Several of Scerbanenco's works featuring the detective character Duca Lamberti were adapted to film around this time, including Caliber 9 (1972) and Cran d'arrêt (1970).

The film's soundtrack was composed by Gianni Ferrio, who had previously worked with Tessari on the 1969 Spaghetti Western Sundance and the Kid, and would do so again on his 1971 giallo The Bloodstained Butterfly. Ferrio's score spans several musical styles, incorporating psychedelic rock, baroque pop and jazz.

== Release ==
Death Occurred Last Night was distributed by Titanus in Italy on September 5, 1970. The film grossed a total of 568,294,000 Italian lire domestically. The film was later released in West Germany as Gemordet wird nur Samtags on July 16, 1971. The film has been distributed internationally under the titles Death Occurred Last Night, as well as Death Took Place Last Night and Horror Came out of the Fog.

== Reception ==
From retrospective reviews, Robert Firsching wrote in AllMovie that the film's plot featured "a great deal more humanity than is typical for the [crime] genre", finding that Tessari's focus on characterisation over plot was its key strength. Firsching commented on the film's score negatively, stating that Ferrio's score and its "bouncy" tone was inconsistent with the film. Nicholas Bell from IONCINEMA described it "as seedy and ridiculous as it is intriguing and unfailingly amusing", and argued "this fascinating title is a definite highlight in the little known Tessari's varied filmography".

The film, and the character of Lamberti, have been seen as precursors to the postmodernist works of American director Quentin Tarantino.

== Footnotes ==
=== References ===
- Curti, Roberto (2013). Italian Crime Filmography, 1968-1980. McFarland. ISBN 978-0786469765.
- Chiti, Roberto; Poppi, Roberto; Pecorari, Mario (1991). Dizionario del cinema italiano: Dal 1970 al 1979. Gremese Editore. ISBN 8876059350.
- Spencer, Kristopher (2008). Film And Television Scores 1950-1979: A Critical Survey by Genre. McFarland & Company. ISBN 978-0786436828.
- Luther-Smith, Adrian (1999). Blood and Black Lace: The Definitive Guide to Italian Sex and Horror Movies. Stray Cat Publishing Ltd.
- Pezzotti, Barbara (2014). Politics and Society in Italian Crime Fiction: An Historical Overview. McFarland & Company. ISBN 978-1476613567.
