= The Violent Breed =

The Violent Breed may refer to any of the following media:

- The Violent Breed, the British theatrical release title for the 1976 Italian film Keoma
- The Violent Breed (1984 film), the British theatrical release title for the 1984 film
