= Cry of a Prostitute =

- Directed by: Andrea Bianchi
- Screenplay by: Piero Regnoli
- Story by: Sergio Simonetti
- Produced by: Mauro Righi
- Starring: Henry Silva; Barbara Bouchet; Fausto Tozzi; Vittorio Sanipoli
- Cinematography: Carlo Carlini
- Edited by: Otello Colangeli
- Music by: Sante Maria Romitelli
- Production company: Alexandra Cinematografica Internazionale
- Distributed by: Variety Distribution
- Release date: 11 January 1974 (Italy)
- Country: Italy
- Box office: ₤444 million

Cry of a Prostitute (Italian: Quelli che contano, also known as Love Kills and Guns of the Big Shots) is a 1974 Italian gangster film directed by Andrea Bianchi.

== Plot ==
Hitman Tony Aniante returns to his native Sicily after having spent many years in the United States. Upon his arrival, the rival families Cantimo and Scannapieco contend for his services, unaware that Aniante's plan is actually to pit one against the other in order to take power, for which a reformed prostitute joins forces with him.

== Cast ==
- Henry Silva as Tony Aniante
- Barbara Bouchet as Margie
- Fausto Tozzi as Don Ricuzzo
- Vittorio Sanipoli as Don Cascemi
- Patrizia Gori as Carmela Scannapieco
- Dada Gallotti as Santa Scannapieco
- Mario Landi as Don Turi Scannapieco
- Alfredo Pea as Zino
- Carla Mancini as Margie's Maid

== Production ==
Cry of a Prostitute was filmed at Incir-De Paolis in Rome and on location in Savona.

== Release ==
Cry of a Prostitute was released on 11 January 1974 in Italy, where it was distributed by Jumbo. The film grossed a total of 444,963,000 Italian lire. The film was released on VHS as Cry of a Prostitute: Love Kills and on DVD by Televista. The Televista release is cut to 86 minutes.

== Reception ==
Austin Fisher in Blood in the Streets: Histories of Violence in Italian Crime Cinema wrote that the film was one in a series of Italian film, alongside La mala ordina (The Italian Connection, also starring Henry Silva) and Milano rovente (Gang War in Milan) that featured "'fixers' travelling over from the USA to resolve problems in the Italian mafia" and "overtly position American practices as the epitome of efficient modernity, in contrast to outmoded Italian ways of conducting business."
