= Killer vs. Killers =

- Norwegian VHS cover art
- Directed by: Fernando Di Leo
- Screenplay by: Fernando Di Leo
- Story by: Fernando Di Leo
- Starring: Henry Silva; Edmund Purdom; Alberto Colajanni; Franco Giogene
- Cinematography: Roberto Gerardi
- Edited by: Amedeo Giomini
- Music by: Franco Campanino
- Production company: Robur Film
- Release date: 1985
- Running time: 86 minutes
- Country: Italy

Killer vs. Killers (Italian: Killer contro killer, lit. 'Killer versus killer') is a 1985 Italian film directed and written by Fernando Di Leo.

Initially planned as a remake of The Asphalt Jungle (1950), the film changed production and only bore small references to the 1950 film. The film was not released theatrically in Italy, and was initially distributed on home video in Switzerland and Norway. It was Di Leo's final work in film.

== Cast ==
- Henry Silva as Sterling
- Edmund Purdom as His Excellency
- Albert Janni as Ferrari
- Franco Diogene as Burton
- Fernando Cerulli as Jaffe
- Dalila Di Lazzaro as Cherry

== Production ==
The film was initially announced in 1983 as Killer e Killers (lit. 'Killer and Killers') by producer Ettore Spagnuolo, with production set to begin in February 1984. It was initially conceived as a remake of The Asphalt Jungle (1950) with director and screenwriter Fernando Di Leo hoping to cast Charles Bronson and Omar Sharif, while ultimately casting Henry Silva and Harrison Muller Jr. who he had worked with on The Violent Breed (1984).

This production did not proceed. Later, the film, now titled Killer vs. Killers, was restarted by the small Rome-based film company called Robur Film. Filming began on September 24, 1984 and was shot in Rome and Monte Carlo. Muller's role was replaced by Mario Colajanni, who was a former singer and the legal representative for Robur Film. He is billed as Albert Janni. Some references to The Asphalt Jungle remain in the film with characters named Jaffe and Sterling.

While trade papers reported the film being completed by November 1985, Robur Films ceded the rights to the film in April 1985.

== Release ==
Killer vs. Killers was never released theatrically in Italy. It was released in 1985. The film was sold abroad, being released on home video in Switzerland on the Cinelux label as Commando di morte while its opening credits gave it the title of Death Commando. It was also released in Norway as Killer vs Killer on the Video Activ label.

Di Leo spoke about the film later, saying, "It's a shame because I had a good story. But it was hell. The film was delayed; it was almost cancelled," and that "the film was poorly distributed. No one saw it. I came out of it sick, exhausted, with zero morale and with the desire to stop making films." Killer vs. Killers was Fernando Di Leo's final film. In a 1988 interview, he said that "The producers no longer have the slightest idea. They are just making reheated stuff. I don't want to prostitute myself to continue making films."

Following a 2004 retrospective series of screenings of Di Leo's films at the Venice Film Festival, there were several DVD releases of his films, including Killer contro killer as Killer vs. Killers.
