= Sins in the Country =

1976 film

- Directed by: Tiziano Longo
- Written by: Paolo Barberio; Marino Onorati
- Starring: Renzo Montagnani; Macha Méril; Femi Benussi
- Cinematography: Alfio Contini
- Edited by: Mario Gargiulo
- Music by: Elio Maestosi; Filippo Trecca
- Release date: 1976
- Language: Italian

Sins in the Country (Italian: Peccatori di provincia, lit. 'Small-town sinners') is a 1976 commedia sexy all'italiana film directed by Tiziano Longo and starring Renzo Montagnani, Macha Méril and Femi Benussi.

== Cast ==
- Renzo Montagnani as Angelo Lo Curcio
- Macha Méril as Vincenzina Lo Curcio
- Femi Benussi as Gigia
- Lauretta Masiero as Concetta Lo Curcio
- Daniela Halbritter as Domitilla Lo Curcio
- Riccardo Garrone as Giuseppe Zito
- Fiona Florence as Miss Zito
- Stefano Amato as Donato Lo Curcio
- Fernando Cerulli as don Alfonso
- Luciana Turina as the Medium
- Salvatore Puntillo as Councilman

== Production ==
The film was produced by Pentax Film. It was the last commedia sexy all'italiana film directed by genre-specialist Tiziano Longo.

== Release ==
The film was released in Italian cinemas by Italian International Film on 28 December 1976.

== Reception ==
Italian film critic Marco Giusti wrote that the film a"never takes a real stylistic direction", being "uncertain between the erotic, the comic, [and] the dramatic genres". Corriere della Sera film critic Giovanna Grassi described the film as "immersed in an absurd 1970s neorealism where even eroticism, which might have its own commercial significance, loses bite because it is diluted by spurious pseudo-intellectualistic dialogues".
