= Naked Violence =

- Directed by: Fernando Di Leo
- Screenplay by: Fernando Di Leo; Nino Latino; Andrea Maggiore
- Based on: I ragazzi del massacro by Giorgio Scerbanenco
- Produced by: Tiziano Longo
- Starring: Pier Paolo Capponi; Susan Scott; Marzio Margine; Renato Lupi
- Cinematography: Franco Villa
- Edited by: Amedeo Gimini
- Music by: Silvano Spadaccino
- Production companies: Daunia Film; Belfagor Cinematografica
- Distributed by: Italian International Film
- Release date: 26 December 1969 (Italy)
- Running time: 99 minutes
- Country: Italy
- Box office: ₤251 million

Naked Violence (Italian: I ragazzi del massacro) is a 1969 Italian giallo-drama film directed by Fernando Di Leo and based on the novel I ragazzi del massacro written by Giorgio Scerbanenco.

== Plot ==
In the evening school of Andrea and Maria, in Milan, a group of eleven, mostly street criminals between thirteen and twenty, brutally murders the teacher Matilde Crescenzaghi for no apparent reason. The police begin to investigate the murder, but find no clear evidence or sufficient information to shed light on the mysterious affair. Pressed by the investigating judge who wants to close the case, but also seized by remorse and by his own conscience, the police-chief Luigi Càrrua entrusts the case to the Commissioner Lamberti, his friend and collaborator.

The latter begins to investigate, remaining overwhelmed by the brutality of the murder, and begins to assume that it was a personal vendetta. Lamberti insists on questioning the boys in his own way, with harsh and coercive methods. With the help of the agent Mascaranti and social worker Livia Hussar, Lamberti will soon come to the truth surrounding the murder.

== Cast ==
- Pier Paolo Capponi as Commissioner Duca Lamberti
- Susan Scott as Livia Ussaro
- Enzo Liberti as Quaestor Luigi Càrrua
- Marzio Margine as Carolino Marassi
- Michel Bardinet as Stelvio Sampero
- Danika La Loggia as Beatrice Romani

== Production ==
Naked Violence was the first film that combined the work of author Giorgio Scerbanenco and director Fernando di Leo, which Italian film historian and critic Roberto Curti described as "extremely important within the Italian crime genre." Di Leo's film does not follow the book closely, with the director explaining that "there wasn't Scerbaneenco's Milan, because I wanted to express more: here's our boys, all our boys, here's what they are becoming, who we have in front of us[...]our crisis has become their crisis." Di Leo changed the characters and pruned the plot down to a minimum.

Naked Violence was shot at Elios Film in Rome.

== Release ==
Naked Violence was distributed theatrically in Italy by Italian International Film on 26 December 1969. The film grossed a total of 251,512,000 Italian lire domestically. The film was released in the United Kingdom as The Boys Who Slaughter.

In 2004 it was restored and shown as part of the retrospective "Storia Segreta del Cinema Italiano: Italian Kings of the Bs" at the 61st Venice International Film Festival. The Film was released by Raro on DVD, which features the uncut Italian version of the film was shown at the Venice festival.

== Notes ==
=== References ===
- Curti, Roberto (2013). Italian Crime Filmography, 1968-1980. McFarland. ISBN 978-0786469765.
