= Code Name: Red Roses =

1968 film

- Directed by: Fernando Di Leo
- Screenplay by: Fernando Di Leo; Enzo Dell'Aquila
- Story by: Luigi Petrini
- Produced by: Dino Fazio; Tiziano Longo
- Starring: James Daly; Pier Angeli; Peter van Eyck
- Cinematography: Franco Villa
- Edited by: Mario Morra
- Music by: Gino Peguri
- Production company: Dino Films
- Distributed by: Imprefilm
- Release date: 24 April 1968 (Parma)
- Running time: 97 minutes
- Country: Italy
- Language: Italian
- Box office: 300,842,000 Italian lire

Code Name: Red Roses (Italian: Rose rosse per il führer, lit. 'Red Roses for the Fuhrer') is 1968 Italian war film directed by Fernando Di Leo and starring James Daly, Pier Angeli, and Peter van Eyck.

== Cast ==
- James Daly as Major Mike Liston
- Pier Angeli as Marie
- Nino Castelnuovo as Vincent
- Peter van Eyck as Colonel Kerr
- Gianni Garko as Alex Postov / Lieutenant Mann
- Michael Wilding as English General
- Mia Genberg as Jeanine
- Ruggero De Daninos as Major Frenke
- Bill Vanders as Jean
- Polidor as Padre Louis
- Sergio Doria as Captain von Bückner
- Sergio Ammirata as Bob
- Gino Santercole as British Parachutist
- Bianca Castagnetta as Partisan
- Max Turilli as Captain von Buckner

== Production ==
Until the mid-1960s in Italy, war films followed the trends by commercially successful American productions that emphasized the more spectacular nature of the genre and were often blended with spy and or thriller film elements with plots that were about secret missions, such as Umberto Lenzi's Desert Commandos (1967) or Camillo Bazzoni's Suicide Commandos (1968) and Fernando Di Leo's Code Name: Red Roses.

Code Name: Red Roses was and Italian film production by the Rome-based Dino Films, a new company created by Alberto Longo and Bernardo Fazio. Fernando di Leo and Enzo Dell'Aquila were hired to develop Luigi Petrini's outline into a script.

Some actors that were announced to play roles had changed during production. This include Jeffrey Hunter whose role was played by James Daly, Gabriele Tinti who was replaced by Sergio Ammirata and Curd Jürgens who was replaced by Peter van Eyck. Also among the cast was Gianni Garko, who dubbed his own lines for the film for the first time.

It was filmed at Elios Film Studios in Rome with exteriors shot in Rome and Bruges. Filming began on December 12, 1967 for a shooting schedule of forty-nine days, with six days in Belgium and two days in England. This 49-day shoot was cut short due to the budget, with only a second unit doing shooting of exteriors in Bruges.

== Release ==
Code Name: Red Roses was released as Rose rosse per il führer in Parma, Italy on April 24, 1968. It was distributed by Imprefilm. The authors of Fernando Di Leo: Master of Italian Film Noir described the Italian box office as being mediocre, earning 300,842,000 Italian lire.

It was released on television in the United States as Code Name: Red Roses on September 10, 1969.

== Bibliography ==
- Allen, Jane (2015). Pier Angeli: A Fragile Life. Jefferson, North Carolina: McFarland & Company.
- Curti, Roberto; Monetti, Deminico (2026). Fernando Di Leo: Master of Italian Film Noir. Jefferson, North Carolina: McFarland & Company. ISBN 978-1-4766-9640-9. LCCN 2026008765.
