= Madness (1980 film) =

- Directed by: Fernando di Leo
- Screenplay by: Fernando di Leo
- Story by: Mario Gariazzo
- Produced by: Armando Novelli
- Starring: Joe Dallesandro; Lorraine De Selle; Patrizia Behn; Gianni Machia
- Cinematography: Enrico Lucidi
- Edited by: Amedeo Giomini
- Music by: Luis Enriquez Bacalov
- Production company: Midia Cinematografica
- Distributed by: Regional
- Release date: March 7, 1980
- Running time: 86 minutes
- Country: Italy
- Box office: ₤25.3 million

Madness (Italian: Vacanze per un massacro) is a 1980 Italian drama erotic thriller film directed by Fernando Di Leo and starring Joe Dallesandro. A low-budget film, it was shot in just twelve days. It was first supposed to be directed by Mario Gariazzo. The film was the last film Dallesandro shot in Italy before returning to United States. The Luis Bacalov's musical score is mainly recycled from his scores for Di Leo's Caliber 9 and Maurizio Lucidi's The Designated Victim.

== Plot ==
(Note: this is the plot to the edited version, the unedited version has several more sex scenes.)

Joe escapes from prison by scaling down a wall. To steal a car, he hits a guy with a rock. Another older man sees him, and attacks Joe with a pitchfork. Joe fights him and eventually knocks him out also, then picks up the pitchfork and kills the unconscious older man. He drives off.

In an interesting version of social hacking, Joe meets an old man on the side of the road and gets the old man to tell him everything about a nearby house (when the owners are home, when they are not, when the man goes hunting) by claiming to be an insurance salesman. He drives near the house, hides the car, and breaks into the house. Hearing a car approach, he leaves.

Liliana, her sister Paola, and her husband Sergio arrive, set up, and have dinner. Sergio and Paola argue, but it is only to throw Liliana off the track, as they are having an affair. Paola asks Sergio when they will have sex, but Sergio wants to go hunting in the morning.

The next morning, Sergio goes off to hunt with a shotgun, Liliana goes into town to do the shopping, and Paola sets out a chair to sunbathe. Joe sneaks up on her, knocks her out, and carries her inside. Then he begins digging under the fireplace.

When Paola wakes up, Joe forces her to start digging. When Liliana comes back, her ties her up with Paola. When Sergio comes back, he forces him to dig for a while, then reveals to Liliana that Paola and Sergio are having an affair. Joe forces Paola and Sergio to have sex by aiming a shotgun at them, then tries to seduce Liliana. Paola makes a plan with Sergio to rush Joe while he is doing this. They try it, but Joe gets to the shotgun first and shoots them both. He then asks Liliana to run away with him. When he goes to check the car, he leaves the shotgun behind. Liliana picks it up and shoots Joe in the back. Freeze frame, Fini.

== Cast ==
- Joe Dallesandro as Joe Brezy
- Lorraine De Selle as Paola
- Patricia Behn as Lilian, Paola's Sister
- Gianni Macchia as Sergio

== Production ==
Madness was based on a story by Mario Gariazzo, who director Fernando di Leo had previously offered script advice for his film The Bloody Hands of the Law and whose films were produced by di Leo's company Cineproduzioni Daunia 70. Gariazzo was originally going to be the director of the film.

Madness was shot in 12 days. Fernando di Leo was not happy with the results of the film, stating that it was a "disappointing film indeed, including my toying with Lorraine De Selle's nude scenes. It's mediocre, but not because I did wrong - I just wasn't interested in it." The director stated he was a hired hand on the film, which lead him to feel that "you don't always have the chance to do what you want, and often you know very well you're making a bad movie, but you do it anyways."

== Release ==
Madness was released on March 7, 1980, where it was distributed by Regional. It grossed a total of 25.3 million Italian lire.

The film is currently available to stream on Kanopy (as of July 2020) and an edited version on Amazon. The Amazon version is an edited 76 minute version, which cuts many of the sex scenes from the 90 minute cut. The unedited version is available from Raro Video on DVD (2012), which is also distributed by Kino Lorber.

== Notes ==
=== References ===
- Curti, Roberto (2013). Italian Crime Filmography, 1968-1980. McFarland. ISBN 978-0786469765.
