= Frame Up =

- Italian theatrical release poster
- Directed by: Emilio Miraglia
- Screenplay by: Massimo De Rita; Dino Maiuri
- Story by: Massimo De Rita
- Produced by: Felice Testa Gay
- Starring: Henry Silva; Beba Lončar; Keenan Wynn
- Cinematography: Erico Menczer
- Edited by: Sergio Montanari
- Music by: Robby Poitevin
- Production companies: Cinegai; Jolly Film
- Distributed by: Unidis
- Release date: 13 April 1968 (Italy)
- Running time: 93 minutes
- Country: Italy
- Languages: Italian; English
- Box office: ₤397.4 million

Frame Up (Italian: Quella carogna dell'ispettore Sterling, literally: "That Bastard Inspector Sterling") is a 1968 Italian noir-crime film directed by Emilio Miraglia and starring Henry Silva, Beba Lončar and Keenan Wynn. In 1971, the American edit was shortened by several minutes and released as The Falling Man.

== Plot ==
A police inspector's son is killed by a gang of thieves and is accused of having killed a police informer. After being kicked out of the police department, the inspector must discover the truth on his own.

== Cast ==
- Henry Silva as Inspector Sterling
- Beba Lončar as Janet
- Keenan Wynn as Police Commissioner Donald
- Carlo Palmucci as Gary
- Pier Paolo Capponi as O'Neil
- Luciano Rossi as Joseph Randolph
- Larry Dolgin as Kelly
- Charlene Polite as Anne
- Bob Molden as Rocky

== Production ==
Frame Up was shot at Cinecittà in Rome and on location in San Francisco.

== Release ==
Frame Up was released theatrically in Italy on 13 April 1968 where it was distributed by Unidis. The film grossed a total of 397,425,000 Italian lire on its theatrical run. The film circulated in various edited forms on its initial release. The European version is about Sterling's quest to find a man who murdered his son and framed him for shooting an informant. It is dramatised through flashbacks that lead up to the murder. The American edit of the film was distributed through Heritage Enterprises in 1971 and re-titled The Falling Man which runs at 85 minutes. The edit changes the story and has a new English-language dub and a new score by Marcel Lawler.

== See also ==
- List of Italian films of 1968

== Notes ==
=== References ===
- Curti, Roberto (2013). Italian Crime Filmography, 1968-1980. McFarland. ISBN 978-0786469765.
- Poppi, Roberto; Pecorari, Mario (2007). Dizionario del cinema italiano. I film (in Italian). Gremese Editore. ISBN 978-8884405036.
