= Rika Dialina =

Greek actress and beauty queen (born 1934)

- Born: Eirini Dialinna; August 8, 1931 (age 95); Heraklion, Crete, Greece
- Spouses: Nikos Papadakos (m. 1954; div. 1964) Nikos Chrysikopoulos (m. 1983, died 2017)
- Beauty pageant titleholder
- Title: Star Hellas 1954
- Major competitions: Star Hellas 1954 (Winner); Miss Universe 1954 (Top 16)

Rika Dialina (Greek: Ρίκα Διαλυνά; born Eirini Dialinna; 8 August 1931) is a Greek actress and beauty pageant titleholder who was crowned Star Hellas 1954 and then represented her country at Miss Universe 1954 in Long Beach, California.

Diallina, along with Miss Korea, Pu Rak Hi, were denied entry into the U.S. because of their alleged Communist affiliations. Dialina was disqualified from obtaining a U.S. visa for allegedly illustrating a book on Communism. In her place went first runner up, Effie Androulakakis, who won the Miss Friendship' award. U.S. Secretary of State John Foster Dulles intervened in Dialina's case and she was able to obtain a temporary entry permit. She arrived just a few days before the event, making the top 16 finalists. Effie Androulakakis was asked to remain in the competition as Miss Crete but she declined, stating that Dialina was "the choice the people of my country to represent them here." Dialina got married while in the U.S. and remained in the country.

In 2002 her artwork was put on display at the Benedictine Art Awards, her work being one of the 40 to make the Park Avenue Art Gallery out of 2000 that participated in the event.

== Filmography ==
- Pontikaki, To 1954 ..... Christina
- Kokkina triantafylla 1955
- Diakopes stin Kolopetinitsa 1959 ..... Judy
- Laos kai Kolonaki 1959 ..... Dedi
- Na zisoun ta ftohopaida 1959 ..... Diana
- Gia to psomi kai ton erota 1959 ..... Hilda
- Enas vlakas kai misos 1959 ..... Ourania Karamaouna
- Koroidaki tis despoinidos, To 1960 ..... Aliki
- Randevou sti Venetia 1960
- Spiti tis idonis, To 1961
- Arhontas tou kampou, O 1961
- Kalos mas angelos, O 1961
- Tre volti della paura, I (Black Sabbath) 1963, segment "I Vourdalak" ..... Maria
- Mostri, I 1963 ..... Anna
- Gamos ala... ellinika 1964 ..... Mrs. Panagiotou
- The Secret of Dr. Mabuse 1964 ..... Judy
- Amore all'italiana 1965
- Giulietta degli spiriti 1965 ..... woman in nightmare
- Diplopennies 1966 ..... Rita
- Io, io, io... e gli altri 1966
- Xerokefalos, O 1970 ..... Sophie
- Natane to 13, napefte se mas! 1970 ..... Lola
- Taxitzou, I! 1970
- Ethelontis ston erota 1971 ..... Tzina Karneli
- Piso mou s' eho, satana! 1971
- Agathiaris kai i atsida, O! 1971 ..... Mitsouko
- Dromos ton iroon, O! 1971
- Trellopenintaris, O 1971 ..... Mrs. Jefferson
- Faflatas, O 1971 ..... Fofi
- Ti 30... ti 40... ti 50... 1972 ..... Natalia
- Efialtis, O 1978
- Parthenokynigos, O 1980
- Tyhodiohtes, Oi 1981
- Kamakia, Ta 1981 ..... Nadia
- Summer Lovers 1982 ..... Monica
- Peraste... filiste... teleiosate! 1986
- Ikoyenia pantrevomaste 1986
- Bananes 1987
- Orpheus & Eurydice 2000 ..... Shepherdess
