= Gang War in Milan =

- Directed by: Umberto Lenzi
- Screenplay by: Franco Enna; Umberto Lenzi
- Starring: Antonio Sabato; Philippe Leroy; Antonio Casagrande; Carla Romanelli
- Cinematography: Lamberto Caimi
- Edited by: Iolanda Benvenuti
- Music by: Carlo Rustichelli
- Production company: Lombard Film
- Distributed by: Variety Film
- Release date: 23 February 1973 (Italy)
- Running time: 101 minutes
- Country: Italy
- Box office: ₤631.702 million

Gang War in Milan (Italian: Milano rovente, lit. 'Scorching Hot Milan') is a 1973 Italian poliziottesco film directed by Umberto Lenzi.

== Cast ==
- Antonio Sabàto: Salvatore Cangemi
- Philippe Leroy: Roger Daverty
- Marisa Mell: Jasmina
- Antonio Casagrande: Lino Caruso
- Carla Romanelli: Virginia
- Tano Cimarosa: Nino Balsamo

== Production ==
Gang War in Milan was Umberto Lenzi's first entry in the crime genre after making several spy and action films in the 1960s. Lenzi stated in an interview that both the film's story and script were by Franco Enna, a giallo novelist who lived in Switzerland and that the credited writer Ombretta Lanza was a daughter of one of the producers who attributed to the story. Lenzi than later claimed that he completely re-wrote the script as it was closer to a 1930s crime film than a film noir.

It was filmed at Icet - De Paolis Studios in Milan and on location in Milan.

== Release ==
Gang War in Milan was released theatrically in Italy on 23 February 1973 where it was distributed by Variety Film. The film grossed a total of 631.702 million Italian lira on its release.

== Reception ==
Director Umberto Lenzi later felt that the film's story had "a basic error on the behalf of the producers [...]. We shouldn't have made the protagonist a pimp. You can have a pickpocket, a drug dealer, or a killer, but not a pimp, because the viewer doesn't sympathize with him. He's a dirty soundrel with whom you can't identify"

== See also ==
- List of Italian films of 1973

== Footnotes ==
=== References ===
- Curti, Roberto (2013). Italian Crime Filmography, 1968-1980. McFarland. ISBN 978-0786469765.
