= Henry Silva =

American actor (1926–2022)

- Silva in 1969
- Born: September 23, 1926; New York City, New York, U.S.
- Died: September 14, 2022 (aged 95); Los Angeles, California, U.S.
- Education: Actors Studio
- Occupation: Actor
- Years active: 1952–2001
- Spouses: Mary Ramus (m. 1949; div. 1955); Cindy Conroy (m. 1959, divorced); Ruth Earl (m. 1966; div. 1987)
- Partner: Wendy Christenfeld (1990–2022; his death)
- Children: 2

Henry Silva (September 23, 1926 – September 14, 2022) was an American actor, with a film and television career which spanned fifty years. A prolific character actor in over 140 productions, he was known for his "dark, sepulchral" looks and brooding screen presence that saw him often play criminals, gangsters, or other "tough guys" in crime and action films. He was also closely associated with the "Rat Pack".

After a string of minor and supporting parts, Silva had his breakthrough with featured roles in the Rat Pack features Ocean's 11 (1960), The Manchurian Candidate (1962), and Sergeants 3 (also 1962), followed by the leading role in Johnny Cool (1963). In the following decade, he worked extensively in European cinema, becoming a star of the Italian poliziotteschi genre.

During the 1980s, Silva made notable appearances as villains in action films like Sharky's Machine (1981) with Burt Reynolds, the cult classic Megaforce (1982), Cannonball Run II (1984), Code of Silence (1985) with Chuck Norris, Above the Law (1988) with Steven Seagal, and Dick Tracy (1990). He was also the voice of supervillain Bane in the DC Animated Universe. One of his final film roles, before his retirement, was as a mob boss in Jim Jarmusch's Ghost Dog: The Way of the Samurai (1999).

== Early life and education ==
Silva was born in Brooklyn, New York City, on September 23, 1926, the son of Jesus Silva and Angelina Martinez. While several sources in his lifetime asserted he was Puerto Rican, Silva himself stated he was of Sicilian and Spanish descent, and was not aware of any Puerto Rican ancestry. His father, a sailor, abandoned the family when he was young, and he grew up in Spanish Harlem with his single mother. He did not learn to speak English until he was 8 years old. He quit school when he was 13 years old to attend drama classes, supporting himself as a dishwasher and waiter at a Manhattan hotel.

By 1955, Silva felt ready to audition for the Actors Studio. He was accepted. When the Studio staged Michael V. Gazzo's play A Hatful of Rain as a classroom project (which itself grew out of an earlier improvisation by Silva, Paul Richards, and Tony Franciosa, based on a scene written by Gazzo, titled "Pot"), it proved so successful that it was presented on Broadway, with students Ben Gazzara, Shelley Winters, Harry Guardino, along with Franciosa, Richards, and Silva, in key roles. Silva also appeared in the play's film version.

== Career ==
=== Early film roles and typecasting ===
Silva's career focused on the portrayal of ethnic villains, including East Asians, Native Americans, Mexicans, and Italians.

His Hollywood debut was an uncredited appearance in Elia Kazan's 1952 Viva Zapata!. Silva then went on to play a succession of villains in films including The Tall T (1957) with Randolph Scott, The Bravados (1958) with Gregory Peck, and The Law and Jake Wade (1958). In the 1959 adventure film Green Mansions, he played a forest-dwelling Venezuela native known as Kua-Ko who tries to murder a young woman played by Audrey Hepburn.

Silva's early career breakthrough was through his association with the Rat Pack, when he was cast as one of eleven casino robbers in the 1960 heist film Ocean's 11, starring Frank Sinatra, Dean Martin, Sammy Davis Jr., and Peter Lawford. Silva landed the role after Sinatra spotted him in a convertible at a stop light on Doheny Drive and asked him to come to the studio the next day.

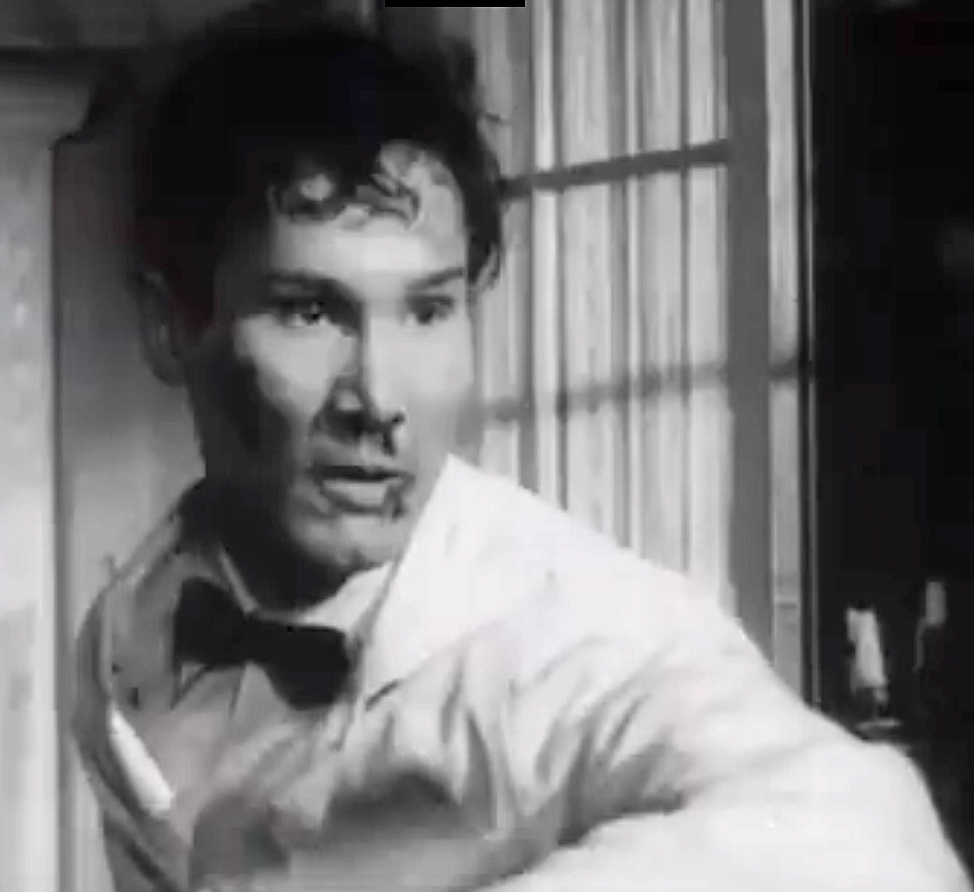
Silva in the trailer for The Manchurian Candidate (1962).

He also played the Korean communist agent Chunjin in the original The Manchurian Candidate (1962), again opposite Sinatra, and portrayed a Native American in Sinatra's and Martin's Rat Pack Western Sergeants 3 that same year.

Silva gradually became typecast playing mobsters, robbers, and other criminals. In 1956, he appeared as a hitman in the episode "Better Bargain" on Alfred Hitchcock Presents. And in 1963, he starred as a mobster in the episode "An Out for Oscar" on The Alfred Hitchcock Hour. However, he did play a comic role as one of the stepbrothers in the 1960 Jerry Lewis film Cinderfella, a parody of Cinderella with Lewis in the title role.

He appeared in many television series in both guest starring and recurring roles. Other appearances include featured roles on The Outer Limits plus roles on episodes of The Untouchables, Rod Serling's Night Gallery, Voyage to the Bottom of the Sea and Mission Impossible, as well as Boris Karloff's suspense series Thriller. He also appeared in The Streets of San Francisco, Dr. Kildare, and many more shows.

=== Leading roles and Italian films ===
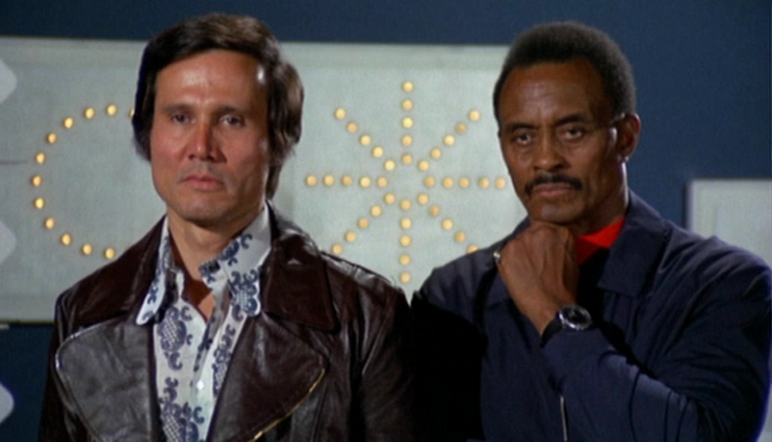
Silva (left) and Woody Strode in The Italian Connection (1972)

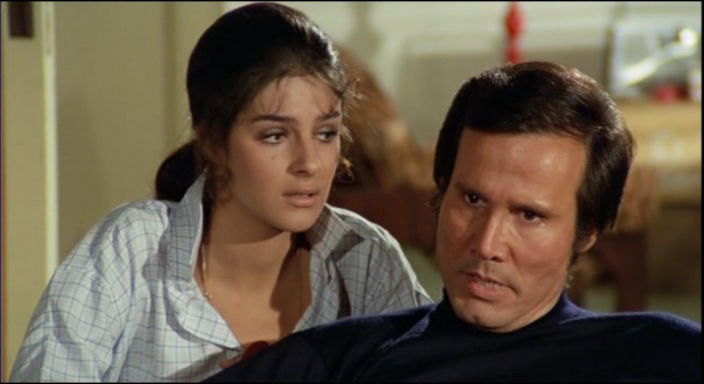
Silva (right) and Antonia Santilli in Il Boss (1973)

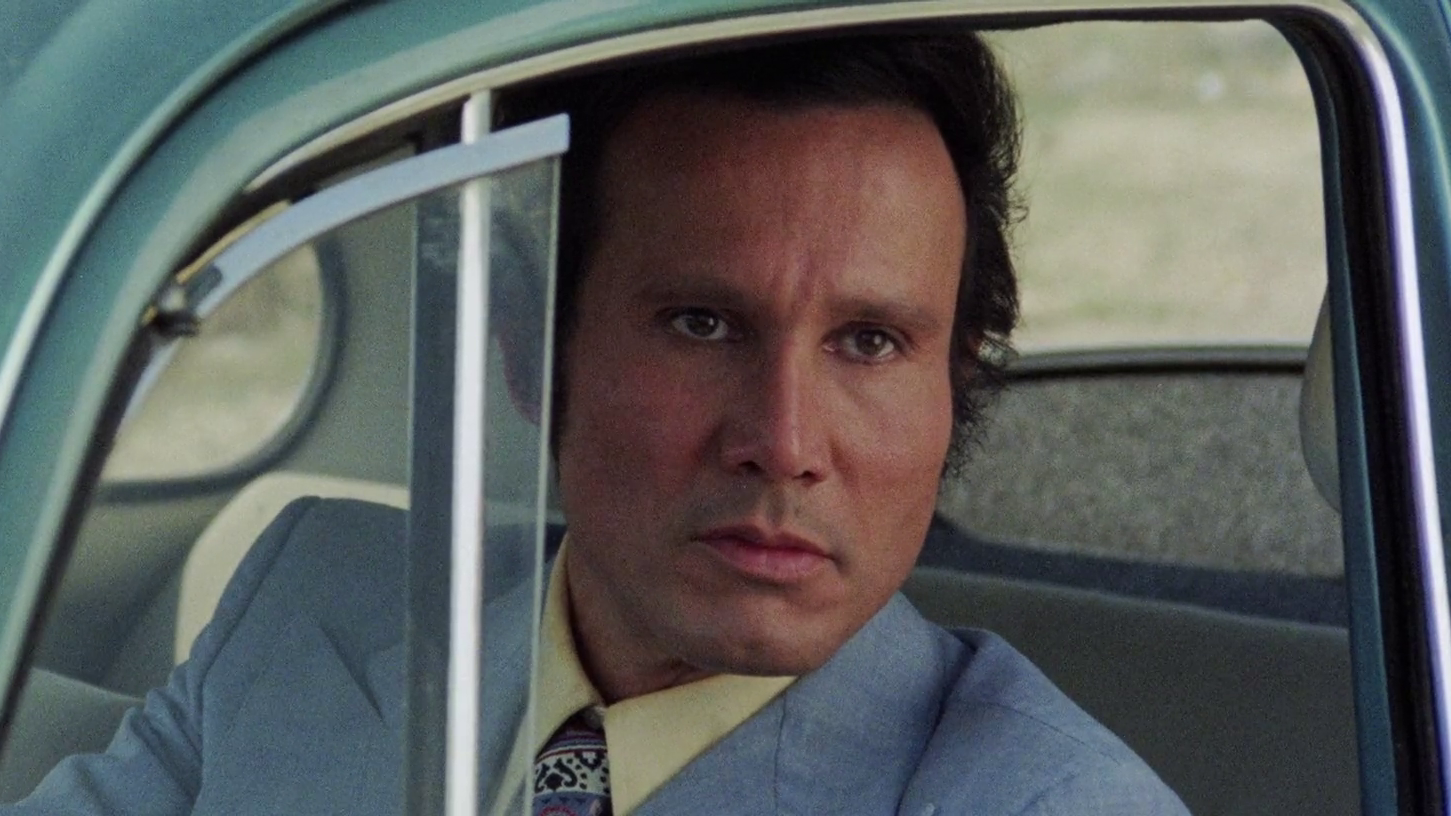
Silva in Cry of a Prostitute (1974).

Silva in Almost Human (1974).

In 1963, Silva played the lead role in the gangster film Johnny Cool, which was produced by United Artists and Chrislaw. His character Salvatore "Johnny Cool" Giordano was a hitman sent on a mission by exiled mobster Johnny Colini to kill the underworld figures who had plotted against the mobster. Premiering on October 19, 1963, the film enjoyed box-office success as well as critical acclaim. Critics also praised the actor's first lead performance, which allegedly carried the film. The supporting cast features Elizabeth Montgomery, Mort Sahl, Telly Savalas, Jim Backus, Joey Bishop, and Rat Pack member Sammy Davis Jr., most of whose characters were murdered by Johnny Cool during the course of the film. Variety praised Silva's performance, writing "Henry Silva, as a Sicilian-born assassin, is at home as the 'delivery boy of death'".

In 1965, an Italian film producer made Silva an offer to star as a hero for a change and he moved his family overseas. Silva's turning-point picture was a Spaghetti Western, The Hills Run Red (1966), which made him a hot box-office commodity in Spain, Italy, Germany, and France. Between 1966 and 1977 he starred or co-starred in at least 25 movies, the majority of which were Italian poliziotteschi films, where he normally played the villain or hitman, or the dark hero, or a combination of the two. These include The Italian Connection (1972), Il Boss (1973), and Almost Human (1974).

He also appeared against type as the Japanese detective Mr. Moto in the 1965 murder mystery The Return of Mr. Moto, and as an Apache who assists rape victim Michele Carey in the 1970 revenge western Five Savage Men.

Returning to the United States in the mid-1970s, he co-starred with Frank Sinatra in Contract on Cherry Street (1977) and Charles Bronson in Love and Bullets (1979). He then signed on as the evil adversary Killer Kane in Buck Rogers in the 25th Century (1979).

=== 1980s–2000s career ===
In the 1980s and 1990s, he appeared as the arrogant hunter Colonel Brock in Alligator (1980), a drug-addicted hitman in Burt Reynolds' Sharky's Machine (1981), a rival military leader in Megaforce (1982), a former prison warden-turned-enforcer in Escape from the Bronx (1983), which was lampooned on Mystery Science Theater 3000, a comedy gangster in Cannonball Run II (1984) opposite many of his former Rat Pack buddies, a drug czar in Code of Silence (1985) opposite Chuck Norris, the villainous CIA agent Kurt Zagon in Steven Seagal's debut Above the Law (1988), the sinister mob hitman Influence in Dick Tracy (1990), and the voice of the ruthless supervillain Bane in Batman: The Animated Series (1994), The New Batman Adventures (1998) and Superman: The Animated Series (1998). Silva also plays the crime boss Ray Vargo in Jim Jarmusch's Ghost Dog: The Way of the Samurai (1999) who puts out a hit on the titular character.

Silva also starred as himself in a spoof of In Search of ...-type shows in the comedy Amazon Women on the Moon (1987) for a segment titled Henry Silva's "Bullshit, or Not!", and made a cameo appearance in the 2001 remake of Ocean's Eleven, playing himself as a spectator at a boxing match.

In 2012 he contributed to Eurocrime! The Italian Cop and Gangster Films that ruled the 70s, a feature-length documentary directed by Mike Malloy.

== Personal life ==
Silva was married three times. His first marriage was to Mary Ramus (February 1949 – 1955) and ended in divorce. His second was on 16 March 1959 to Cindy Conroy. He was married to Ruth Earl from September 4, 1966, until it ended in divorce in November 1987. Silva and Earl had two children, both of whom were born in Los Angeles: Michael Henry Silva, who was born on September 3, 1969, and Scott Stevens Silva, who was born July 14, 1976.

=== Death ===
Silva died on September 14, 2022, aged 95, at the Motion Picture & Television Fund home in Woodland Hills, Los Angeles.

== Partial filmography ==
=== Film ===
- 1952 Viva Zapata! as Hernandez, a peasant who challenges "president" Zapata (uncredited)
- 1956 The Better Bargain
- 1956 Crowded Paradise
- 1957 The Tall T as "Chink"
- 1957 A Hatful of Rain as "Mother"
- 1958 The Law and Jake Wade as Rennie
- 1958 The Bravados as Lujan
- 1958 Ride a Crooked Trail as Sam Teeler
- 1959 Green Mansions as Kua-Ko
- 1959 The Jayhawkers! as Lordan
- 1960 Ocean's 11 as Roger Corneal
- 1960 Cinderfella as Maximilian
- 1962 Sergeants 3 as Mountain Hawk
- 1962 The Manchurian Candidate as Chunjin
- 1963 A Gathering of Eagles as Colonel Joe Garcia
- 1963 Johnny Cool as Salvatore Giordano / Johnny Cool
- 1964 The Secret Invasion as John Durrell, Assassin
- 1965 Je vous salue, mafia! as Schaft
- 1965 The Reward as Joaquin
- 1965 The Return of Mr. Moto as Mr. Moto
- 1966 The Plainsman as Crazy Knife
- 1966 The Hills Run Red as Garcia Mendez
- 1967 Matchless as Hank Norris
- 1967 Assassination as John Chandler / Philip Chandler
- 1968 Never a Dull Moment as Frank Boley
- 1968 Frame Up as Inspector Sterling
- 1969 Probabilità zero as Duke
- 1970 The Animals (aka Five Savage Men) as Chatto
- 1971 Man and Boy as Caine
- 1972 The Italian Connection as Dave Catania
- 1973 L'insolent as Emmanuel Ristack dit "L'insolent"
- 1973 Il Boss as Nick Lanzetta
- 1973 Les Hommes as Everett
- 1973 Zinksärge für die Goldjungen as Luca Messina
- 1974 Peur sur la ville
- 1974 Cry of a Prostitute as Tony Aniante
- 1974 Almost Human as Commissario Walter Grandi
- 1974 Kidnap as Commissario Caprile
- 1974 White Fang to the Rescue as Mr. Nelson
- 1975 Manhunt in the City as David Vannucchi
- 1976 Shoot as Zeke Springer
- 1976 Crimebusters as Major Paolo Altieri
- 1976 Free Hand for a Tough Cop as Brescianelli
- 1977 Contract on Cherry Street as Roberto Obregon
- 1977 Foxbat as Michael Saxon
- 1977 Napoli spara! as Santoro
- 1979 Love and Bullets as Vittorio Farroni
- 1979 Thirst as Dr. Gauss
- 1979 Day of the Assassin as Police Chief Jorge Gomez
- 1980 Virus as General Garland
- 1980 Alligator as Colonel Brock
- 1981 Sharky's Machine as Carlos "Billy Score" Scorelli
- 1982 Wrong Is Right as Rafeeq
- 1982 Trapped as Henry Chatwill
- 1982 Megaforce as Duke Guerera
- 1983 Chained Heat as Lester
- 1983 Escape from the Bronx as Floyd Wrangler
- 1983 Le Marginal as Sauveur Meccacci
- 1984 The Violent Breed as Kirk Cooper
- 1984 Cannonball Run II as "Slim"
- 1985 Man Hunt as Prison Boss
- 1985 Killer vs. Killers as Sterling
- 1985 Lust in the Dust as Bernardo
- 1985 Code of Silence as Luis Comacho
- 1986 Allan Quatermain and the Lost City of Gold as Agon
- 1987 Amazon Women on the Moon as Himself (segment "Bullshit or Not")
- 1988 Bulletproof as Colonel Kartiff
- 1988 Above the Law as CIA Agent Kurt Zagon
- 1989 Fists of Steel as Shogi
- 1989 Trained to Kill as "Ace" Duran
- 1989 La via della droga as Captain Wesson
- 1989 Cyborg – Il guerriero d'acciaio as "Hammer"
- 1990 Dick Tracy as "Influence"
- 1991 L'ultima meta as Warden Yashin
- 1992 The Harvest as Detective Topo
- 1992 Three Days to a Kill as Perez
- 1993 South Beach as Santiago
- 1994 The Silence of the Hams as Police Chief
- 1995 Fatal Choice as Gene Serino
- 1995 Drifting School as General Stearn
- 1996 Mad Dog Time as Joe "Sleepy Joe" Carlisle
- 1996 The Prince as Marshall Stern
- 1997 The End of Violence as Juan Emilio
- 1999 Unconditional Love as Ted Markham
- 1999 Ghost Dog: The Way of the Samurai as Ray Vargo
- 2001 Ocean's Eleven as Boxing Spectator #1

=== Television ===
- 1956 Alfred Hitchcock Presents — (Season 2 Episode 11: "Better Bargain") as Harry Silver
- 1961 Thriller as Toby Wolfe (Season 1 Episode 35: "Dark Legacy)
- 1963 The Alfred Hitchcock Hour — (Season 1 Episode 26: "An Out for Oscar") as Bill Grant
- 1963-1964 The Outer Limits as Chino Rivera / General Juan Mercurio (2 episodes)
- 1960-1962 The Untouchables as Charlie "Little Charlie" Sebastino / "Joker" (3 episodes)
- 1963 Dr. Kildare as Ed Carson (1 episode)
- 1967 The F.B.I. as Richard Macklin (Season 3 Episode 9: "Line of Fire")
- 1965 Daniel Boone (1964 TV series) as Zapotec - S2/E3 - "The Moundbuilders"
- 1965 Voyage to the Bottom of the Sea (1 episode)
- 1969 Mission Impossible (1 episode) as Norvan Krueger
- 1969 Hawaii Five-O (1 episode, "Savage Sunday") as Elpidio Acuna
- 1971 The F.B.I. as Lee Everett Chard (Season 7 Episode 5: "Dynasty of Hate")
- 1971 Night Gallery (1 episode, "The Doll")
- 1973 The Streets of San Francisco (1 episode)
- 1974 The F.B.I. (1974) as Stanley Chasen (Season 9 Episode 17: "The Two Million Dollar Hit")
- 1979 Buck Rogers in the 25th Century as Kane
- 1994 Batman: The Animated Series as Bane (1 episode)
- 1998 The New Batman Adventures as Bane (1 episode)
- 1998 Superman: The Animated Series as Bane (1 episode)

== Stage credits ==
- 1953 Camino Real (National Theatre, Broadway) as First Officer
- 1955–56 A Hatful of Rain (Lyceum Theatre and Plymouth Theatre, Broadway) as "Mother"
