= I milanesi ammazzano al sabato =

1969 novel by Giorgio Scerbanenco

- Author: Giorgio Scerbanenco
- Language: Italian
- Publisher: Garzanti
- Publication date: 1969
- Publication place: Italy
- Pages: 178

I milanesi ammazzano al sabato (translation: Milanese Kill on Saturdays) is a 1969 crime novel by the Italian writer Giorgio Scerbanenco. It revolves the disappearance of the beautiful daughter of a truck driver, which leads the investigator to the slums and brothels of Milan. It was the final installment in Scerbanenco's Milan Quartet about the medical doctor and investigator Duca Lamberti.

== Publication ==
The novel was published in 1969 through Garzanti in Milan. It has been translated into French, Spanish, Catalan and German.

== Legacy ==
The novel was the basis for the 1970 Italian-German film Death Occurred Last Night. The film was directed by Duccio Tessari and stars Frank Wolff as Lamberti.

It lent its title to the 2008 album I Milanesi Ammazzano il Sabato by the Italian rock band Afterhours.
