= Blood and Diamonds =

1978 film

- Directed by: Fernando Di Leo
- Screenplay by: Fernando Di Leo
- Story by: Fernando Di Leo
- Produced by: Umberto Russo; Vittorio Russo
- Starring: Claudio Cassinelli; Martin Balsam; Barbara Bouchet; Pier Paolo Capponi
- Cinematography: Roberto Gerardi
- Edited by: Amedeo Giomini
- Music by: Luis Enriquez Bacalov
- Production company: Teleuropa International Film
- Distributed by: Titanus
- Release date: 17 March 1978 (Italy)
- Running time: 102 minutes
- Country: Italy
- Box office: ₤259,502 million

Blood and Diamonds (Italian: Diamanti sporchi di sangue) is a 1978 Italian noir-poliziottesco film directed by Fernando di Leo.

== Cast ==
- Claudio Cassinelli: Guido Mauri
- Martin Balsam: Rizzo
- Barbara Bouchet: Lisa
- Pier Paolo Capponi: Tony
- Olga Karlatos: Maria
- Vittorio Caprioli: commissioner

== Production ==
The original title for the film was Roma calibro 9 (lit. 'Rome caliber 9'). The film is very similar to Di Leo's earlier film Caliber 9, with Italian film historian and critic Roberto Curti describing it as "a reversal of Caliber 9" with the relationships in the film being contrary to each other.

The cast initially intended to include Franco Gasparri, fresh from the success of the Mark il poliziotto film series, in the main role of Guido Mauri.

== Release ==
Blood and Diamonds premiered in Rome on 17 March 1978. The film was distributed by Titanus in Italy, the day after the kidnapping of Aldo Moro which led to the film grossing only 259,502,900 Italian lira.

== Legacy ==
Part of Luis Bacalov's score was recycled by Bruno Mattei for Hell of the Living Dead (1980).

== See also ==
- List of Italian films of 1978

== Notes ==
=== References ===
- Curti, Roberto (2013). Italian Crime Filmography, 1968-1980. McFarland. ISBN 978-0786469765.
