= Up and Down (1965 film) =

Su e giù
- Directed by: Mino Guerrini
- Written by: Mino Guerrini
- Cinematography: Luigi Kuveiller; Aldo Tonti
- Music by: Marcello Giombini
- Release date: 1965
- Country: Italy
- Language: Italian

Su e giù (transl. Up and down) is a 1965 Italian anthology comedy film directed by Mino Guerrini.

== Cast ==
- Guido Alberti (segment "Colpo da leoni, Il")
- Béatrice Altariba (segment "Questione di principio")
- Paola Biggio as Cuccio's Wife (segment "Questione di Principo")
- Maria Grazia Buccella as La signora
- Lando Buzzanca as Cuccio (segment "Questione di Principo")
- Bianca Castagnetta (segment " Il Colpo Del Leone")
- Alida Chelli as The young lady
- Umberto Felici (segment " Il Colpo Del Leone")
- Paolo Ferrari as Giorgio (segment " Il Marito D'Agosto")
- Mino Guerrini (segment "Questione di Principo")
- Luigi Leoni (segment " Il Colpo Del Leone")
- Antonella Lualdi as Evi (segment "il marito d'agosto")
- Marc Michel as Baldovino Uberti (segment " Il Colpo Del Leone")
- Eleonora Rossi Drago as Violante Persici (segment " Il Colpo Del Leone")
- Enrico Maria Salerno as Enrico (segment "Questione di Principo")
- Aldo Tonti (segment "Questione di Principo")
- Luigi Vannucchi as Doctor Lanfranchi (segment "Questione di Principo")
- Daniele Vargas as Professor Maestrelli (segment "Questione di Principo")
