= Antonia Santilli =

Italian actress (born 1949)

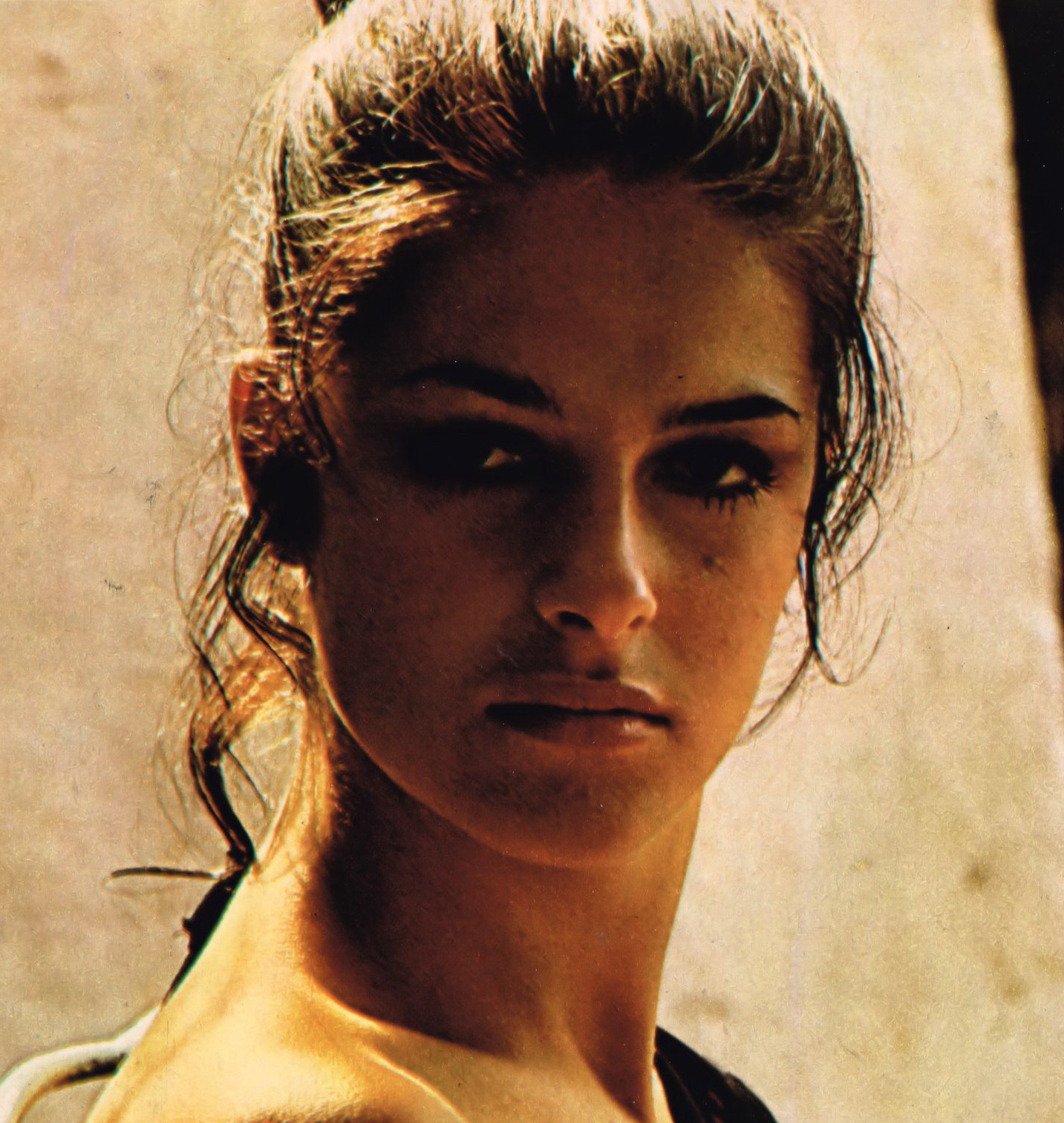
- Santilli in 1971
- Born: 8 August 1949 (age 76); Spigno Saturnia, Lazio, Italy
- Other names: Irina Ross
- Occupations: Actress; model
- Years active: 1971–1974

Antonia Santilli (born 8 August 1949) is an Italian former actress and model. Born in Spigno Saturnia, Lazio, she began modelling and acting in theatre productions while enrolled at the Sapienza University of Rome. In 1971, she appeared in an issue of the adult magazine Playmen. She appeared in twelve films between 1971 and 1974. Her final film role was in the comedy Unbelievable Adventures of Italians in Russia (1974), shot in the Soviet Union.

== Filmography ==
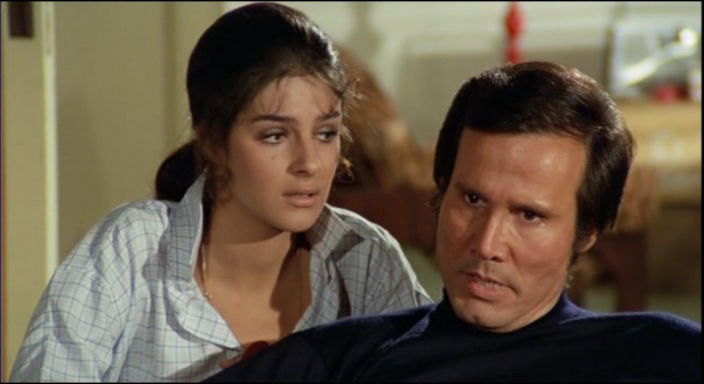
Antonia Santilli and Henry Silva in Il Boss (1973)

Year	Title	Role	Notes
1971	Oasis of Fear		Stunt double
1972	Grazie signore p...	Eva	Credited as Irina Ross
1972	Boccaccio	Donna nella tinozza	
1972	Roman Scandals '73	Chiarina	
1972	Il mio corpo con rabbia	Silvia	
1972	Decameroticus	Pamela	
1973	Il Boss	Rina D'Aniello	
1973	The Executioner of God		
1973	Io e lui	Flavia Protti	
1973	Buona parte di Paolina	Paolina Buonaparte	
1973	Ancora una volta prima di lasciarci	Carli	
1974	Unbelievable Adventures of Italians in Russia	Olga	Final film role
