= Il Boss =

- Italian film poster
- Directed by: Fernando di Leo
- Screenplay by: Fernando di Leo
- Based on: Mafioso by Peter McCurtin
- Produced by: Armando Novelli
- Starring: Henry Silva; Richard Conte; Gianni Garko; Antonia Santilli; Corrado Gaipa; Marino Masé; Howard Ross; Claudio Nicastro; Gianni Musy; Mario Pisu; Vittorio Caprioli; Pier Paolo Capponi
- Cinematography: Franco Villa
- Edited by: Amedeo Giomini
- Music by: Luis Enriquez Bacalov
- Production company: Cineproduzioni Daunia 70
- Distributed by: Alherat
- Release date: 1 February 1973 (Italy)
- Running time: 111 minutes
- Country: Italy
- Box office: ₤774.172 million

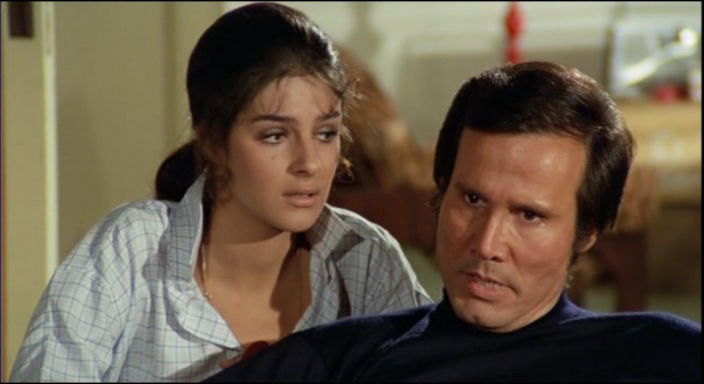
Antonia Santilli and Henry Silva

Il Boss (En. The Boss, also known as Murder Inferno) is a 1973 Italian poliziottesco film written and directed by Fernando Di Leo, and starring Henry Silva, Richard Conte, Gianni Garko, amnd Antonia Santilli. It is the final part of Di Leo's Milieu Trilogy, also consisting of Milano calibro 9 and La mala ordina, both released in 1972. The screenplay is based on the novel Mafioso by American author Peter McCurtin.

== Plot ==
Nick Lanzetta (Henry Silva) takes out several members of a rival crime family for his boss Don Corrasco (Richard Conte). The enemy clan attempts retribution by kidnapping an associate's daughter, who turns out to be a nymphomaniac. A violent power struggle within the Mafia ensues.

== Cast ==
- Henry Silva as Nick Lanzetta
- Richard Conte as Don Corrasco
- Gianni Garko as Commissioner Torri
- Vittorio Caprioli as The Quaestor
- Pier Paolo Capponi as Cocchi
- Antonia Santilli as Rina Daniello
- Claudio Nicastro as Don Giuseppe Daniello
- Corrado Gaipa as Lawyer Rizzo
- Gianni Musy as Carlo Attardi
- Mario Pisu as On. Gabrielli
- Marino Masé as Pignataro
- Howard Ross as Melende

== Release ==
Il Boss was released in Italy on 1 February 1973, where it was distributed by Alherat. The film grossed a total of ₤774.172 million Italian lira on its release.
