= Io e lui =

- Directed by: Luciano Salce
- Cinematography: Armando Nannuzzi
- Edited by: Antonio Siciliano
- Music by: Bruno Zambrini
- Distributed by: Columbia Pictures
- Release date: 1973
- Language: Italian

Io e lui (He and I) is a 1973 Italian comedy film directed by Luciano Salce.

It is based on the novel with the same name by Alberto Moravia.

== Plot ==
The life of an unsuccessful screenwriter, who is also a sex addict, is changed when he begins having conservations with his penis.

== Cast ==
- Lando Buzzanca as Rico
- Bulle Ogier as Irene
- Vittorio Caprioli as Cutica
- Antonia Santilli as Flavia Protti
- Gabriella Giorgelli as Fausta, the wife of Rico
- Yves Beneyton as Maurizio
- Mario Pisu as Protti
- Paolo Bonacelli as Vladimiro
- Nicoletta Elmi as Virginia
