= Boccaccio (1972 film) =

1972 Italian comedy film

- Directed by: Bruno Corbucci
- Written by: Mario Amendola; Bruno Corbucci
- Produced by: Dino De Laurentiis
- Cinematography: Luigi Kuveiller
- Edited by: Eugenio Alabiso
- Music by: Carlo Rustichelli
- Production company: Dino de Laurentiis Cinematografica
- Release date: 1972
- Running time: 98 minutes
- Country: Italy
- Language: Italian

Boccaccio (also known as The Nights of Boccaccio) is a 1972 Italian comedy film written and directed by Bruno Corbucci. It is loosely based on the Giovanni Boccaccio's novel Decameron, and it is part of a series of derivative comedies based on the success of Pier Paolo Pasolini's The Decameron (1971).

== Cast ==
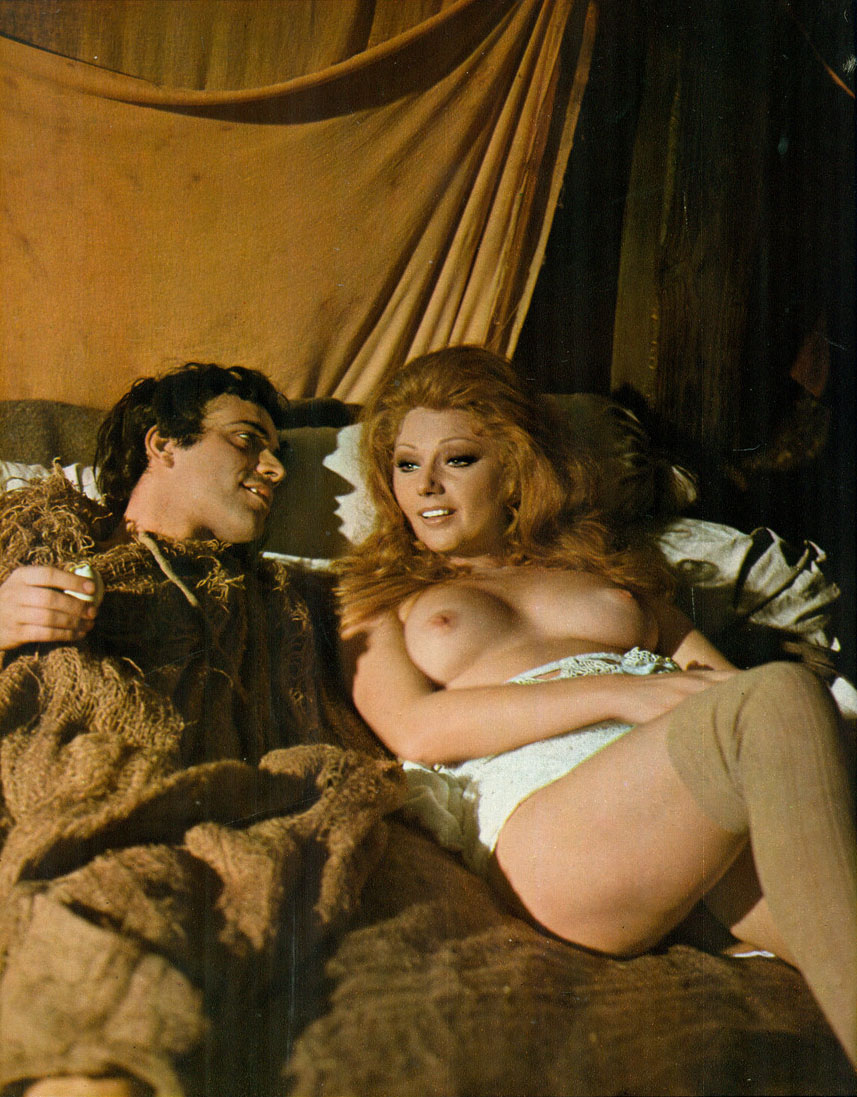
Montesano and Koscina photographed on set (1972)

- Alighiero Noschese: Lambertuccio da Cecina
- Enrico Montesano: Buonamico di Cristofano aka Buffalmacco
- Mario Carotenuto: Judge Nicola
- Sylva Koscina: Fiammetta
- Isabella Biagini: Ambruogia
- Raymond Bussières: Cagastraccio
- Bernard Blier: dottor Mazzeo
- Pia Giancaro: Monna Lisa
- Paola Tedesco : Lidia
- Andrea Fabbricatore: Calandrino
- Pascale Petit: Giletta di Narbona
- María Baxa: Tebalda
- Rosita Pisano: Mannocchia
- Sandro Dori: Nicostrato
- Lino Banfi: Father Ignazio da Canosa
- Pippo Franco: Bruno degli Olivieri
- Toni Ucci: Pietro da Vinciolo
- Franca Dominici: Perdicca
- Luisa Dominici: Belcolore
- Guido Celano: Messer Anselmo
- Andrea Aureli: Maso
- Hélène Chanel: Princess of Civignì
- Ignazio Leone: Il Bargello
- Antonia Santilli: donna nella tinozza
- Nello Pazzafini: Marito della donna nella tinozza
- Gastone Pescucci: Giovanni Cioppolo
- Mimmo Poli: Spettatore grasso
- Luca Sportelli: Loderinghi
