= Love Italian Style (film) =

Amore all'italiana
- Directed by: Steno
- Written by: Francesco Luzi
- Produced by: Emo Bistolfi
- Starring: Walter Chiari; Rika Diallina
- Cinematography: Carlo Carlini
- Edited by: Giuliana Attenni
- Music by: Robby Poitevin
- Release date: 1965
- Running time: 95 minutes
- Country: Italy
- Language: Italian

Amore all'italiana (Love Italian Style) is a 1965 Italian comedy film directed by Steno. The film stars Walter Chiari.

== Cast ==
- Walter Chiari
- Raimondo Vianello
- Paolo Panelli
- Paolo Carlini
- Vivi Bach
- Luigi De Filippo
- Alicia Brandet
- Rika Dialina
- Isabella Biagini
- Adriana Ambesi
- Nicole Faida
- Susanna Clemm (as Susanna Clem)
- Silvia Daniels
- Lucretia Love (as Lucrezia Love)
- Angela Portaluri
- Bruno Scipioni
