= Monica Strebel =

Swiss actress

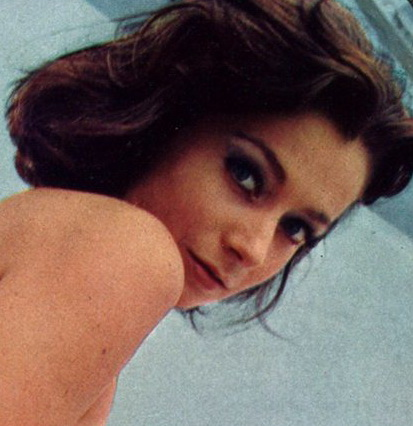
Strebel in Italian magazine IO (1969)

Monica Strebel is a Swiss actress, mainly active in Italian cinema.

Strebel's first starring role was in 1968, in Amore o qualcosa del genere, and her performance was well received by critics. She later starred in a number of Italian films, including Fernando Di Leo's A Woman on Fire and Francesco Maselli's Lettera aperta a un giornale della sera.
