= Robby Poitevin =

- Also known as: Robby Poitevin
- Born: Robert Poitevin; October 24, 1926; Paris, France
- Died: October 3, 2003 (aged 76)
- Genre: Pop music
- Occupations: Composer, pianist, conductor
- Instruments: Vibraphone, piano
- Years active: 1948–2003

Robby Poitevin (born Robert Poitevin; October 24, 1926 – October 3, 2003) was a French composer, pianist, conductor, and vibraphonist known for his work in popular music and Italian film scores.

== Biography ==
Poitevin began his career between 1948 and 1950 as a vibraphonist in Hubert Rostaing's sextet. He recorded approximately a dozen 78 rpm records and performed with musicians including Dizzy Gillespie, Benny Goodman, Édith Piaf, and Henri Salvador.

At the end of the 1950s, after moving to Italy, he founded the group "I Robby's", performing on keyboards alongside Dino Verde, Franco Micalizzi, and Raffaele Aliberti. The group performed with musicians including Armando Trovajoli and Emilio Pericoli.

From 1964 to 1969, Poitevin composed film scores for Italian cinema, frequently collaborating as an arranger and conductor with Nora Orlandi. He also composed music for the children's television series Giovanna, la nonna del Corsaro Nero.

He also conducted several popular music recordings, including "La casa del sole", the Italian version of the song "The House of the Rising Sun".

== Filmography ==
=== Conductor ===
- Destination Miami: Objective Murder (Appuntamento a Dallas), directed by Piero Regnoli (1964)
- Kiss Kiss, Kill Kill (Kommissar X - Jagd auf Unbekannt), directed by Gianfranco Parolini (1966)
- Savage Gringo, directed by Antonio Román (1966)
- The Texican, directed by Lesley Selander (1966)
- Johnny Yuma, directed by Romolo Guerrieri (1966)
- Sheriff with the Gold (Uno sceriffo tutto d'oro), directed by Osvaldo Civirani (1966)
- Ten Thousand Dollars for a Massacre , directed by Romolo Guerrieri (1967)
- Vengeance Is Mine, directed by Giovanni Fago (1967)
- It Was Nice to Love You, directed by Adimaro Sala (1968)
- The Sweet Body of Deborah, directed by Romolo Guerrieri (1968)
- I'll Sell My Skin Dearly, directed by Ettore Maria Fizzarotti (1968)
- Double Face, directed by Riccardo Freda (1969)

=== Composer ===
- Love Italian Style, directed by Steno (1965)
- The Hired Killer, directed by Franco Prosperi (1966)
- The Battle of the Mods, directed by Franco Montemurro (1966)
- Operation White Shark, directed by Filippo Walter Ratti (1966)
- 32 Caliber Killer, directed by Alfonso Brescia (1967)
- Death at Owell Rock, directed by Riccardo Freda (1967)
- Assassination, directed by Emilio P. Miraglia (1967)
- Rita of the West, directed by Ferdinando Baldi (1967)
- Hot Diamonds in Cold Blood, directed by Aldo Florio (1967)
- Frame Up, directed by Emilio P. Miraglia (1968)
- Hate Thy Neighbor, directed by Ferdinando Baldi (1968)
- Man Who Cried for Revenge, directed by Mario Caiano (1968)
- Besieged, directed by Romano Scavolini (1969)
- Franco and Ciccio... Thief and Guard, directed by Marcello Ciorciolini (1969)
- Detective Belli, directed by Romolo Guerrieri (1969) – music arrangements
