= Marianne Comtell =

French actress

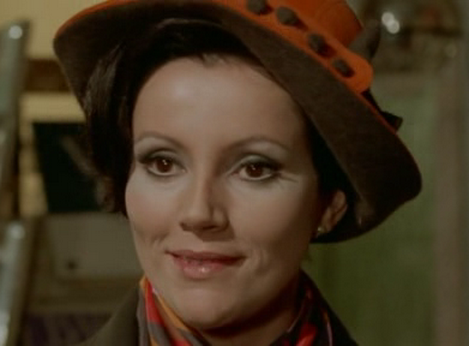
Marianne Comtell

Marianne Comtell is an actress known for the 1969 film Police Chief Pepe, The Sensuous Sicilian (1973), and Garcon! (1983). She also appeared in Cran d'arrêt (1970), a film directed by French director Yves Boisset.

== Movies and Television ==
Year	Name of Movie/Television	Movie/TV Show
1983	Garçon!	Movie
1978	Victims of Vice	Movie
1977	A Man Called Magnum	Movie
1974	Allez... On Se Telephone!	Movie
1973	The Sensuous Sicilian	Movie
1971	À la guerre comme à la guerre	Movie
1970	Cran d'arrêt	Movie
1969	Le Fouineur	Movie
1968	Pasha	Movie
1980	La Vie des autres	Television
1977	Un juge, un flic	Television
1974	Jo Gaillard	Television
1973	Molière pour Rire et pour Pleurer	Television
1972	Les Évasions célèbres	Television
