= Traitors to All =

1966 novel by Giorgio Scerbanenco

- Author: Giorgio Scerbanenco
- Original title: Traditori di tutti
- Language: Italian
- Publisher: Garzanti
- Publication date: 1966
- Publication place: Italy
- English publication date: 1970
- Pages: 187

Traitors to All (Italian: Traditori di tutti) is a 1966 detective novel by the Italian writer Giorgio Scerbanenco. It is known as Betrayal in the United Kingdom. It tells the story of a former medical doctor who becomes involved in a criminal plot involving a mysterious suitcase left with him. It is the second installment of Scerbanenco's Milano Quartet and follows A Private Venus.

== Publication ==
The novel was originally published through Garzanti in Milan in 1966. It first appeared in English in 1970, translated by Eileen Ellenbogen as Duca and the Milan Murders. A new translation by Howard Curtis appeared in 2013 in the United Kingdom and 2014 in the United States.

== Reception ==
In 2013, Publishers Weekly described the book as an "excellent crime novel" and wrote that Scerbanenco "smartly and logically weaves all the various plot threads together".

It received the French Grand Prix de Littérature Policière for best foreign novel in 1968.
