= Mino Guerrini =

Italian actor

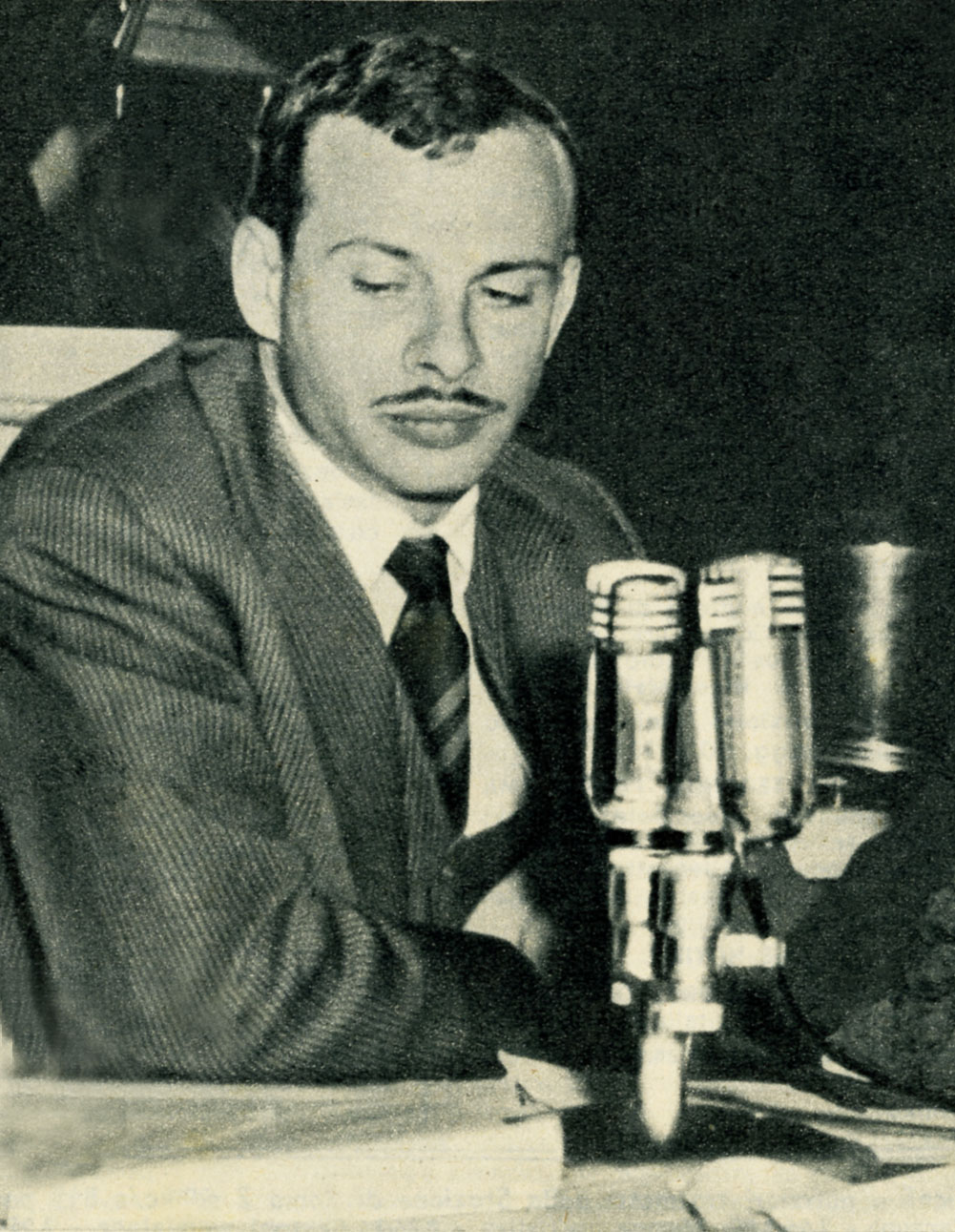
- Mino Guerrini (1955)
- Born: 16 December 1927; Rome, Kingdom of Italy
- Died: 10 January 1990 (aged 62); Rome, Italy
- Occupations: Film director; screenwriter; actor
- Years active: 1954–1990

Mino Guerrini (16 December 1927 – 10 January 1990) was an Italian director, screenwriter, journalist, actor, and painter.

== Biography ==
Born in Rome as Giacomo Guerrini, Guerrini entered the cinema industry in 1954 as screenwriter in Marcello Pagliero's Vergine moderna; after several collaborations (including the screenplay of Mario Bava's The Girl Who Knew Too Much), he made his directorial debut in an episode of the film Amore in quattro dimensioni and from then started a prolific career, mainly focused on comedy films. He was also a character actor, often in his own films; as actor, he's probably best known for the role of Nino in Damiano Damiani's La rimpatriata.

== Filmography ==
as director

- 1964: Amore in 4 dimensioni
- 1964: Love and Marriage
- 1965: Up and Down
- 1966: The Third Eye
- 1966: Killer 77, Alive or Dead
- 1966: Date for a Murder
- 1968: Days of Fire
- 1972: Gli altri racconti di Canterbury
- 1973: Un ufficiale non si arrende mai nemmeno di fronte all'evidenza, firmato Colonnello Buttiglione
- 1974: Il colonnello Buttiglione diventa generale
- 1974: Professore venga accompagnato dai suoi genitori
- 1976: Ragazza alla pari
- 1977: Von Buttiglione Sturmtruppenführe
- 1982: Cuando calienta el sol... vamos a la playa
- 1986: The Mines of Kilimanjaro
