= Giancarlo Cobelli =

Italian actor and director (1929–2012)

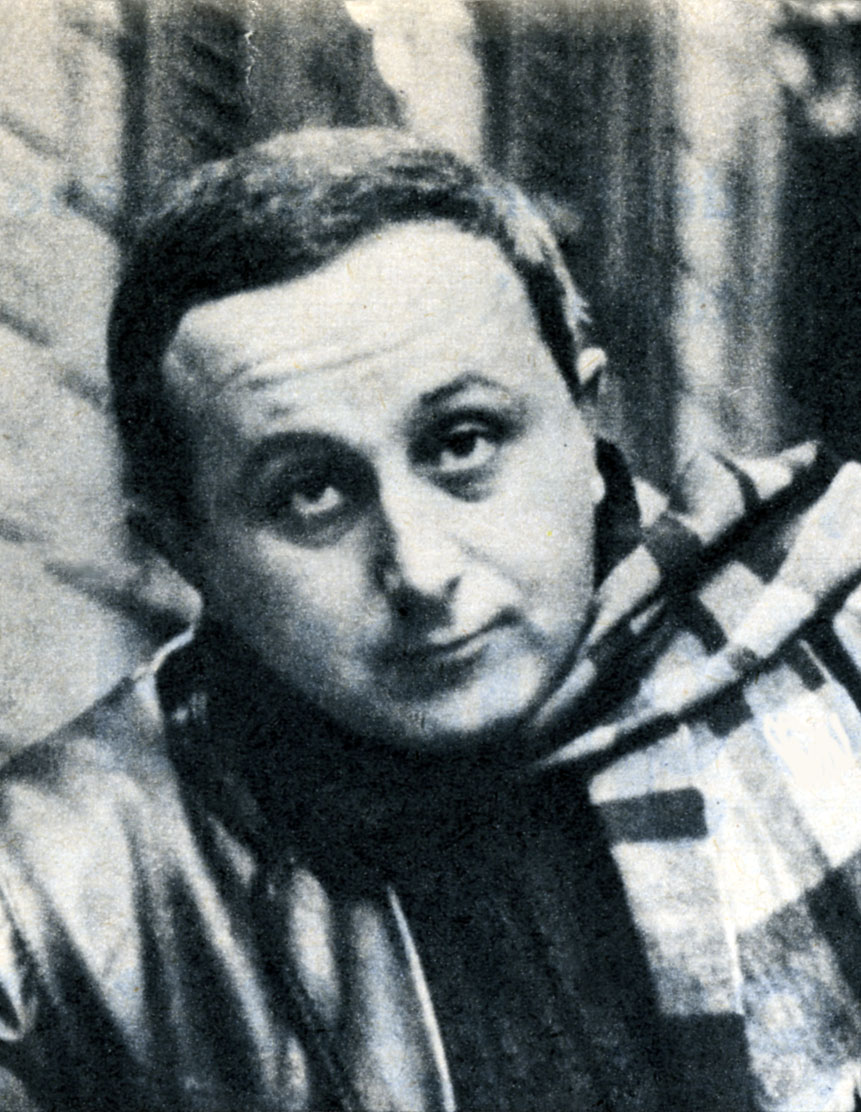
- Cobelli in 1965
- Born: Carl Gerhard Petersen; 12 December 1929; Milan, Lombardy, Kingdom of Italy
- Died: 16 March 2012 (aged 83); Rome, Lazio, Italy
- Occupations: Actor, director
- Years active: 1955–2012

Giancarlo Cobelli (12 December 1929 – 16 March 2012) was an Italian actor and stage director. He was considered one of the most important directors of Italian theatre.

== Life and career ==
Born in Milan, Cobelli studied acting at Giorgio Strehler's Piccolo Teatro, then obtained some success as actor and mime, on stage and on television. Cobelli later was primarily active as theater director, especially devoting himself to operas alongside names such as Riccardo Muti, Roberto Abbado and Riccardo Chailly. He won several UBU Awards as best director.
