= Carla Mancini =

Italian actress (born 1950)

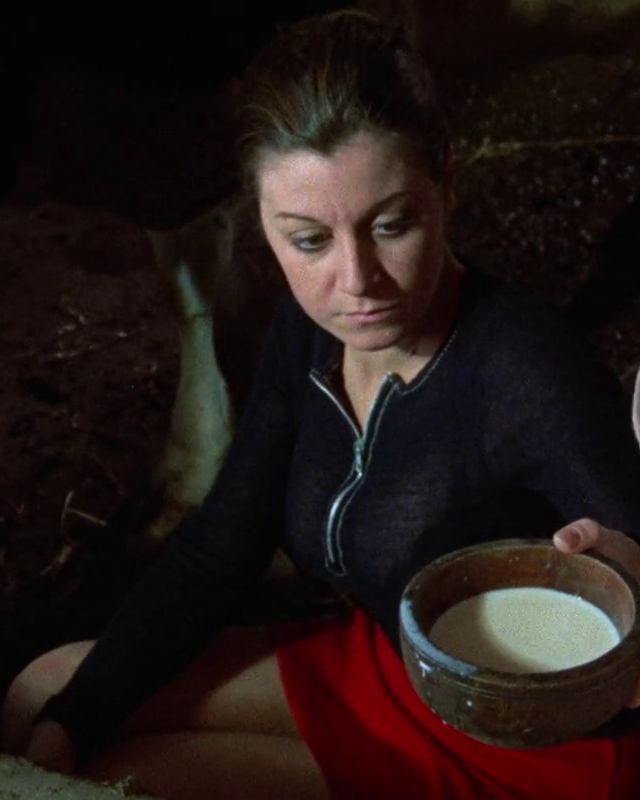
- Mancini in Cry of a Prostitute (1974)
- Born: April 21, 1950 (age 76); Rome, Lazio, Italy
- Occupation: Actress
- Years active: 1968– (film & TV)

Carla Mancini (born 21 April 1950) is an Italian film and television actress. A graduate of the Centro Sperimentale di Cinematografia she made numerous appearances in films of the early 1970s.

== Selected filmography ==
- Rough Justice (1970)
- The President of Borgorosso Football Club (1970)
- The Bird with the Crystal Plumage (1970)
- The Beasts (1971)
- Desert of Fire (1971)
- Erika (1971)
- Where the Bullets Fly (1972)
- The Red Queen Kills Seven Times (1972)
- Who Killed the Prosecutor and Why? (1972)
- Indian Summer (1972)
- Alleluja & Sartana are Sons... Sons of God (1972)
- Seven Blood-Stained Orchids (1972)
- Go Away! Trinity Has Arrived in Eldorado (1972)
- How Funny Can Sex Be? (1973)
- The Fighting Fist of Shanghai Joe (1973)
- My Name Is Nobody (1973)
- Cry of a Prostitute (1974)
- Don't Hurt Me, My Love (1974)
- L'arbitro (1974)
- Pasqualino Cammarata, Frigate Captain (1974)
- The Visitor (1974)
- The Perfume of the Lady in Black (1974)
- Somewhere Beyond Love (1974)
- Appassionata (1974)
- Beyond the Door (1974)
- Il... Belpaese (1977)

== Bibliography ==
- Alex Cox. 10,000 Ways to Die: A Director's Take on the Spaghetti Western. Oldcastle Books, 2009.
- Thomas Weisser. Spaghetti Westerns--the Good, the Bad and the Violent: A Comprehensive, Illustrated Filmography of 558 Eurowesterns and Their Personnel, 1961–1977. McFarland, 2005.
