= Cran d'arrêt =

- Directed by: Yves Boisset
- Screenplay by: Antoine Blondin; Yves Boisset; Francis Cosne
- Based on: A Private Venus by Giorgio Scerbanenco
- Produced by: Francis Cosne
- Starring: Bruno Cremer; Marianne Comtell; Renaud Verley; Mario Adorf; Raffaella Carrà
- Cinematography: Jean-Marc Ripert
- Edited by: Paul Cayatte
- Music by: Michel Magne
- Production companies: FrancCos Films; San Marco Cinematografica
- Release dates: 14 January 1970 (France); 27 August 1970 (Italy)
- Running time: 90 minutes
- Countries: France; Italy
- Language: French

Cran d'arrêt (lit. 'Stop Notch') is a 1970 film directed by Yves Boisset and starring Bruno Cremer. The film is based on the novel A Private Venus by Giorgio Scerbanenco.

== Plot ==
A doctor removed from the order for euthanasia is called by a man to help his son depressed since the suicide of his girlfriend. But in the handbag of the deceased, an undeveloped film is discovered by the doctor who decides to investigate the alleged suicide of the young woman.

== Cast ==
- Bruno Cremer as Duca Lamberti / Lucas Lamberti
- Renaud Verley as Davide Auseri
- Marianne Comtell as Livia Ussaro
- Raffaella Carrà as Alberta Radelli
- Mario Adorf as Le sadique aux cheveux longs
- Jean Martin as Le majordome
- Rufus as The photographer's assistant
- Claudio Gora as Le docteur Carrua
- Marina Berti as La soeur d'Alberta
- Vanna Brosio as Marilina
- Agostina Belli as Mara

== Production ==
Cran d'arrêt is based on the novel A Private Venus by Giorgio Scerbanenco, the first novel in the Duca Lamberti series. It was sold on August 29, 1967 to Alberto Pugliese's Produzioni Cinematografiche Mediterranee. The rights reverted back to the publisher as no film was made within two years per their contract. It was then sold again to February 28, 1969 Francis Cosne's FranCos Films.

It is a French and Italian international co-production. It was produced by the Paris-based FrancCos Films and the Rome based San Marco Cinematografica. The latter company put up 30% of the budget that was estimated at about 1.7 million francs. It began shooting on July 24, 1969 and was shot on location in Milan and Lake Como with interior scenes being shot at Paris studios.

The film's director was Yves Boisset, whom the French producers chose after seeing his film Coplan sauve sa peau (1968). Boisset considered the film to do "in the meantime" as he was making plans for another film project with The Cop (1970). Boisset later said that the film was a "flawed film" and that it "seems obvious to me, but perhaps it's not as bad as I thought."

== Release ==
'Cran d'arrêt was released in France on January 14, 1970. The film had 347,809 entries in France.

It was later released in Italy on August 27, 1970 as Il caso "Venere privata". It grosses a total of 232,593,000 Italian lire.
