= Days of Fire =

- Directed by: Mino Guerrini
- Screenplay by: Adriano Baracco; Fernando Di Leo; Mino Guerrini
- Story by: Adriano Baracco; Fernando Di Leo; Mino Guerrini
- Produced by: Benito Pertaccini
- Starring: Joseph Cotten; Franca Polesello; Giulio Brogi
- Cinematography: Franco Delli Colli
- Edited by: Enzo Micarelli
- Music by: Egisto Macchi
- Production company: Bema Film
- Distributed by: I.N.D.I.E.F.
- Release date: 30 April 1968 (Italy)
- Running time: 110 minutes
- Country: Italy
- Box office: ₤83,977 million

Days of Fire (Italian: Gangsters '70) is a 1968 Italian crime-thriller film written and directed by Mino Guerrini.

== Premise ==
After being released from prison, elderly Destil plans a heist to secure a peaceful retirement. He forms a gang and attempts to steal a briefcase full of diamonds, but another group of criminals catches onto his plan.

== Cast ==
- Joseph Cotten as Fabio Destil
- Franca Polesello as Franca
- Giulio Brogi as Rudy
- Giampiero Albertini as Sempre si
- Bruno Corazzari as Affattato
- Dennis Patrick Kilbane as Biochemist
- Jean Louis as Affatato's accomplice
- Milly Vitale as Anna
- Franco Ressel as Passenger
- Linda Sini

== Production ==
Days of Fire was written by Fernando Di Leo under the title Elegia in un cimitero d'asfalto o Il sol nero (lit. 'Elegy in an Asphalt Cemetery or Black Sun)'.

== Release ==
Days of Fire was distributed theatrically in Italy by I.N.D.I.E.F. on 30 April 1968. The film grossed a total of 83,977,000 Italian lire domestically. Italian film historian and critic Roberto Curti stated that the movie was "unnoticed before critics and audiences alike". Curti stated the film was not re-discovered until the late 1990s.

The film has been released as Gangsters '70 and Days of Fire. It was released in Canada on VHS by the UVI label in Italian.
