= A Woman on Fire =

- Directed by: Fernando Di Leo
- Screenplay by: Fernando Di Leo; Antonio Racioppi
- Story by: Fernando Di Leo; Antonio Racioppi
- Starring: Françoise Prévost; Gianni Macchia; Michel Bardinet; Monica Strebel
- Cinematography: Franco Villa
- Edited by: Mario Morra
- Music by: Gino Peguri
- Production company: Ferti Film
- Distributed by: Italian International Film
- Release date: January 27, 1969 (Forli)
- Running time: 91 minutes
- Country: Italy

A Woman on Fire (Italian: Brucia, ragazzo, brucia is a 1969 Italian erotic-drama film written and directed by Fernando Di Leo.

== Cast ==
- Françoise Prévost as Clara Frisotti
- Gianni Macchia as Giancarlo
- Michel Bardinet as Silvio Frisotti
- Monica Strebel as Marina
- Danika La Loggia (as Danika) as Aunt Bice, Clara's sister
- Anna Pagano as Monica
- Franca Sciutto as the maid
- Marco Vegliante as Marco
- Miriana Milosevic (as Miriam Alex) as the Swiss girl
- Ettore Geri as Alberini
- Leonora Ruffo as the woman in Clara's dreams

== Production ==
A Woman on Fire was an Italian film and was the first film production from the Rome-based company Ferti Film. Ferti film was founded by Fernando Di Leo and Tiziano Longo on July 24, 1968 and was named after the two.

The film was written by Di Leo and Antonio Racioppi a filmmaker and who at the time was mostly focused on stage direction and would return to filmmaking in the 1970s. The film was also the first film Di Leo would work on where he personally handled the financing. The picture was made on a budget of about 120 million Italian lire. To reach an audience beyond Italy, Di Leo cast the French actors Françoise Prévost and Michel Bardinet. Prévost was a common actress in Italian films since the 1960s while Bardinet relocated to Italy in 1963 appearing about 15 films between 1966 to 1973.

Filming took place in Fregene and at Elios Film Studios and began on September 2, 1968.

== Release ==
The film was distributed by Italian International Film as Brucia ragazzo, brucia (lit. 'Burn, boy, burn') in Forli, Italy on January 27, 1969. On February 12, 169 the film was seized for obscenity by the police by order of the Public Prosecutors' Office of Bari. Di Leo held a press conference to defend the film.Following this, an investigating judge ordered that the film be released on March 1, 1969. The film gained a great commercial success and launched the career of Di Leo as director. It grossed over 465 million lire within the first three months of distribution and grossed a total of 887,650,000 lire during its theatrical run.

The film was distributed in the United Kingdom by Miracle Films as Burn Boy Burn and opened on July 27, 1970 at London's Cinephone. It was released in North America where it distributed by Ellmann Enterprises in Los Angeles on May 27, 1970 as A Woman on Fire and in Toronto, Canada on May 12, 1970 as Woman on Fire.
