= The Violent Breed (1984 film) =

- Directed by: Fernando Di Leo
- Screenplay by: Nino Marino; Fernando Di Leo
- Story by: Nino Marino; Fernando Di Leo
- Starring: Henry Silva; Harrison Muller; Woody Strode; Carole André
- Cinematography: Roberto Gerardi
- Edited by: Amedeo Giomini
- Music by: Paolo Rustichelli
- Production company: Visione Cinematografica
- Distributed by: Visione
- Release dates: February 24, 1984 (Jesi and Ancona)
- Running time: 89 minutes
- Country: Italy
- Budget: 702 million Italian lire
- Box office: 80,538,000 Italian lire

The Violent Breed (Italian: Razza violenta, lit. 'Violent Breed') is a 1984 Italian war film directed by Fernando Di Leo.

== Production ==
The Violent Breed was an Italian production from the Rome-based Visione Cinematografica. The company predominantly made films that were aimed at foreign markets. The film had a budget of 702 million Italian lire.

The cast included Henry Silva and Woody Strode, who had previously worked with Di Leo in The Italian Connection (1972). Among the cast was Harrison Muller Jr., who had a short-lived notoriety as a lead in various Italian genre films of the period, generally either Conan the Barbarian (1982)- influenced works or post-apocalyptic films. Olivier Billiottet of Starfix described the film as being part of the Italian trend for First Blood knock-offs such as Fabrizio De Angelis's Thunder Warrior (1983) and Antonio Margheriti's Tornado (1983).

Di Leo said that foreign buyers forced him to make several changes to the story and that "[Nino] Marino couldn't do anything to defend what was good in his script, and not even the producer could, as he absurdly adhered to any change he was requested to make."

The film was shot between August 8 and September 8, 1983. It was shot at Incir De Paolis Studios in Rome, with exteriors shot in Ostia Antica, Manziana and Palestrina, Lazio. The assistant director Nino Marino, cameraman Claudio Morabito and actor Harrison Muller spent three days in New York and one in Bangkok to shoot a few exterior shots.

== Release ==
The Violent Breed was distributed theatrically in Italy Visione and released in Jesi and Ancona on February 24, 1984. It grossed 80,538,000 Italian lire domestically.

It was released in the United Kingdom on September 21, 1984 where it was distributed by Cannon Film as The Violent Breed. It was shown at London's Eros Piccadilly Circus on a double bill with the Israeli film Private Manoeuvres (1983). It received further theatrical releases in the Philippines and Portugal and was released in the United States on Home Video.

== Reception ==
In the Italian newspaper Corriere della Sera found that the director's scripts were "recycled while changing characters, locations and tasks" and concluded that the film "wastes Di Leo's schrewd skills [...] The Vietnam-Spaghetti trend is the blatant example of the lack of ideas in Italian commercial cinema."

In their book on Fernando Di Leo, authors Roberto Curti and Deminico Monetti described the film as "an almost unmitigated disaster"
