= A Private Venus =

Novel by Giorgio Scerbanenco

A Private Venus (Italian: Venere privata) is a 1966 detective novel by the Italian writer Giorgio Scerbanenco. It tells the story of how the former doctor Duca Lamberti is assigned to treat the alcoholic son of a millionaire, and begins to unveil the secrets surrounding the death of a young woman in the affluent world of Milan. It was the first in a series of four novels about Dr. Duca Lamberti. An English translation by Howard Curtis was published in 2012.

The book was the basis for the film Cran d'arrêt (1970) directed by Yves Boisset.

== Reception ==
Kirkus Reviews wrote in 2014 that "the first volume in Scerbanenco’s Milano Quartet is a blast from the past, a sleek, stripped-down reminder of the fast, brutal days of Continental noir".
