= Fernando Di Leo =

Italian film director

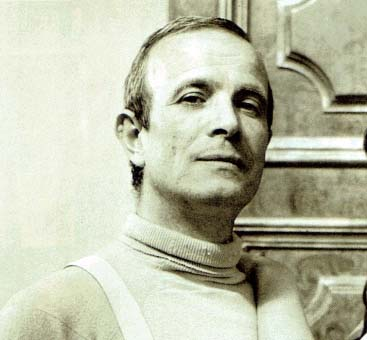
- Born: 11 January 1932; San Ferdinando di Puglia, Italy
- Died: 1 December 2003 (aged 71); Rome, Italy
- Occupations: Film director, screenwriter

Fernando Di Leo (11 January 1932 – 1 December 2003) was an Italian film director and script writer. He made 17 films as a director and about 50 scripts from 1964 to 1985.

== Biography ==
Fernando Di Leo was born on 11 January 1932 in San Ferdinando di Puglia. After briefly working in a Rome film school Centro Sperimentale di Cinematografia, Di Leo made his debut as a director as part of the omnibus comedy Gli eroi di ieri, oggi, domani with his episode titled Un posto in paradiso (transl. A Place in Heaven). Following this Di Leo wrote several scripts for Westerns, often uncredited. This included work on A Fistful of Dollars and For a Few Dollars More. Some of his Westerns had uncredited literary sources, such as Days of Vengeance which as loosely based on Alexandre Dumas' The Count of Monte Cristo.

Di Leo was a fan of film noir and wanted to make an Italian version of these films. Among his first efforts was the script for Mino Guerrini's Date for a Murder based on Franco Enna's novel Tempo di massacro written in 1955. In Di Leo's version, the setting is moved to a contemporary Rome and has elements of contemporary spy films. Di Leo worked with Guerrini again on the film Gangsters '70 which did not do well in the box office. Di Leo began directing more of his own films at the time including the war film Code Name: Red Roses and a few erotic films: A Woman on Fire, A Wrong Way to Love and Seduction. From 1969 to 1976, di Leo was able to produce many of his own works with his production company Duania cineproduzioni 70. He followed this with a return to noir with Naked Violence, a film adapting a novel by Giorgio Scerbanenco, a writer who Di Leo would adapt for several future film productions.

Di Leo would make a giallo film with Slaughter Hotel starring Klaus Kinski and Margaret Lee. Following this, Di Leo worked on Caliber 9 and The Italian Connection which were both inspired by the writing of Scerbanenco. He followed up this film Il Boss, a film which got Di Leo in trouble with politicians and authorities due to the films display connections between the mafia and Italy's major party, Democrazia Cristiana. Di Leo followed this up with Shoot First, Die Later in 1974. Di Leo worked through the latter half of the 1970s directing Mister Scarface, Kidnap Syndicate, and Nick the Sting. He also wrote scripts for other directors such as Romolo Guerrieri's Young, Violent, Dangerous and Ruggero Deodato's Live Like a Cop, Die Like a Man. Di Leo's last film produced by his company Duania cineproduzioni 70 was Rulers of the City in 1976. He continued with a few more films after with the film noir Blood and Diamonds, the erotic drama To Be Twenty - both in 1978, and Madness in 1980.

Di Leo worked in television in the 1980s. In 1981, Di Leo directed L'assassino ha le ore contate, a crime series of six 45-minute episodes produced by Vittorio Procopio's Pat Film. Di Leo described the mysteries as being in the vein of Agatha Christie and said he drew on his experience adapting Giorgio Scerbanenco's crime fiction. The series was intended for RAI Uno but never aired. It remains unreleased.

Di Leo also made the theatrically released action film The Violent Breed and his last film Killer vs. Killers towards the mid-1980s. Killer vs. Killers wasn't released theatrically in Italy and only surfaced 20 years later on DVD.

Di Leo died in December 2003.

== Select filmography ==
Title	Year	Credited as				Notes	Ref(s)
Title	Year	Director	Screenwriter	Story author	Other	Notes	Ref(s)
Un cuore per odiarvi	1962		Yes				
Gli eroi di ieri, oggi, domani	1963	Yes	Yes				
A Fistful of Dollars	1964		Yes			Uncredited	
The Return of Ringo	1965		Yes	Yes	Yes	Assistant director	
For a Few Dollars More	1965		Yes	Yes	Yes	Uncredited as screenwriter. Also 2nd assistant director	
Django	1966		Yes			Uncredited	
Kiss Kiss...Bang Bang	1966		Yes	Yes			
Massacre Time	1966		Yes	Yes			
Seven Guns for the MacGregors	1966		Yes				
Johnny Yuma	1966		Yes				
Navajo Joe	1966		Yes				
Sugar Colt	1966		Yes				
Long Days of Vengeance	1967		Yes				
Up the MacGregors!	1967		Yes	Yes			
Wanted	1967		Yes				
Pecos Cleans Up	1967		Yes				
Date for a Murder	1967		Yes	Yes			
Poker with Pistols	1967		Yes				
Hate for Hate	1967		Yes	Yes			
Death Rides Along	1967		Yes	Yes			
La lunga sfida	1967		Yes				
The Ruthless Four	1968		Yes	Yes			
Beyond the Law	1968		Yes				
Code Name: Red Roses	1968	Yes	Yes		Yes	Dialogue	
Gangsters '70	1968		Yes	Yes			
...e venne il tempo di uccidere	1968		Yes	Yes			
Train for Durango	1968		Yes			Uncredited	
A Woman on Fire	1969	Yes	Yes	Yes			
A Wrong Way to Love	1969	Yes	Yes	Yes			
Naked Violence	1969	Yes	Yes				
Slaughter Hotel	1971	Yes	Yes				
Caliber 9	1972	Yes	Yes				
Bloody Friday	1972		Yes	Yes		Uncredited	
The Italian Connection	1972	Yes	Yes	Yes	Yes	Also dialogue	
Il Boss	1973	Yes	Yes	Yes			
Seduction	1973	Yes	Yes				
Shoot First, Die Later	1974	Yes	Yes				
Kidnap Syndicate	1975	Yes	Yes				
Loaded Guns	1975	Yes	Yes				
Live Like a Cop, Die Like a Man	1976		Yes	Yes			
Nick the Sting	1976	Yes					
Mister Scarface	1976	Yes	Yes	Yes			
Young, Violent, Dangerous	1976		Yes	Yes			
Blood and Diamonds	1978	Yes	Yes	Yes			
To Be Twenty	1978	Yes	Yes	Yes			
Madness	1980	Yes	Yes				
Pover'ammore	1982	Yes					
The Violent Breed	1984	Yes	Yes	Yes			
Killer vs. Killers	1985	Yes	Yes	Yes			
