= Pier Paolo Capponi =

Italian actor and screenwriter (1938–2018)

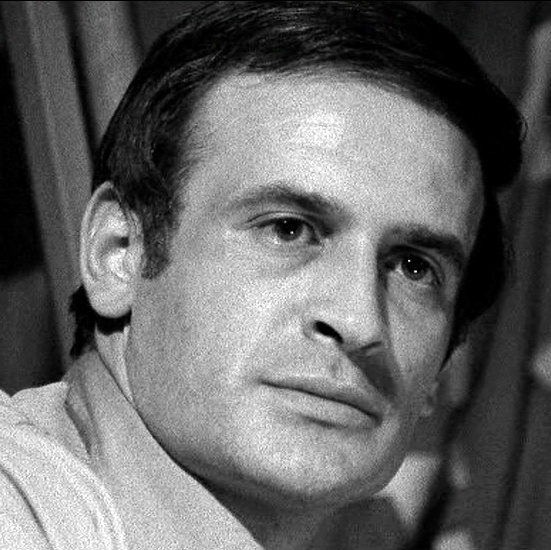
- Capponi in The Subversives (1967)
- Born: 9 June 1938; Subiaco, Italy
- Died: 15 February 2018 (aged 79); Torri in Sabina, Italy
- Other name: Norman Clark
- Occupations: Actor; Screenwriter

Pier Paolo Capponi (9 June 1938 – 15 February 2018) was an Italian actor and screenwriter.

== Life and career ==
Born in Subiaco, after his studies Capponi attended a theater school and later was chosen by director Vittorio De Seta for an important role in Almost a Man. His film career was divided equally between auteur films (with, among others, Paolo e Vittorio Taviani, Valerio Zurlini, Gérard Corbiau, Francesco Rosi and Nelo Risi) and genre films, in which he was sometimes credited as Norman Clark. On the big screen with some regularity for a decade, after 1977 Capponi focused his appearances on TV series and on stage.

== Partial filmography ==
- Our Man in Casablanca (1966) - Hermann von Heufen
- Almost a Man (1966) - Ugo
- Maigret und sein größter Fall (1966) - Man (uncredited)
- King of Hearts (1966) - Un Officier Anglais
- My Name Is Pecos (1966) - Joe Clane
- Mister X (1967) - Mister X
- The Subversives (1967) - Muzio
- Frame Up (1968) - O'Neil
- Black Jesus (1968) - Officer
- Il gatto selvaggio (1968)
- Commandos (1968) - Corbi
- Bandits in Rome (1968) - Director of Supermarket
- The Lady of Monza (1969) - Count Taverna
- Naked Violence (1969) - Duca
- Kill the Fatted Calf and Roast It (1970) - Il detective privato / The private detective
- Bocche cucite (1970) - Francesco
- Mafia Connection (1970) - Francesco Macaluso
- Many Wars Ago (1970) - Lieutenant Santini
- Defeat of the Mafia (1970) - Scott Luce
- Forbidden Photos of a Lady Above Suspicion (1970) - Peter
- The Cat o' Nine Tails (1971) - Police Supt. Spini
- Il sergente Klems (1971) - Mohamed Abdel Krim
- A Season in Hell (1971)
- Il était une fois un flic... (1972) - Ugo (uncredited)
- Seven Blood-Stained Orchids (1972) - Inspector Vismara
- Valerie Inside Outside (1972) - David Rocchi
- The Nun and the Devil (1973) - Don Carlos
- The Boss (1973) - Cocchi
- Diario di un italiano (1973) - Lorenzo
- Abbasso tutti, viva noi (1974) - Rufo
- The Last Desperate Hours (1974) - The Inspector
- La badessa di Castro (1974) - Monsignor Francesco Cittadini
- Delitto d'autore (1974) - Marco Girardi
- Blood and Diamonds (1977) - Tony
- Antonio Gramsci: The Days of Prison (1977) - Enrico
- Standard (1978)
- La posta in gioco (1988) - Attilio Matrangola
- Bankomatt (1989) - Impiegato banca
- A Season of Giants (1990, TV Movie) - Burchard
- Au nom du père et du fils (1992) - Salvatore
- L'urlo della verità (1992) - Marcello's father
- Fiorile (1993) - Duilio
- L'amore dopo (1993) - Antonov
- 18000 giorni fa (1993) - Renzo Fraticelli
- Uno a me, uno a te e uno a Raffaele (1994) - The Lawyer
- Farinelli (1994) - Broschi
- The Bankers of God: The Calvi Affair (2002) - Roberto Rosone
- Legami di famiglia (2002)
