= Franco Enna =

Italian writer (1921–1990)

Francesco Cannarozzo
- Born: 16 September 1921; Castrogiovanni (Enna), Sicily, Italy
- Died: 19 July 1990 (aged 68); Lugano, Switzerland
- Occupations: novelist, poet, playwright, journalist
- Writing career
- Pen name: Franco Enna
- Language: Italian
- Genres: Detective fiction, Science fiction

Franco Enna was the best known pseudonym of Francesco Cannarozzo (16 September 1921 – 19 July 1990), an Italian writer. He was born in Castrogiovanni (now known as Enna), Sicily, on the 16 September 1921, the son of a police sergeant, and died at Lugano, Switzerland, on 19 July 1990. For his work, he was awarded the Eunus Prize by the Kiwanis Club of Enna, in 1986.

== Writing ==
A detective novel by Franco Enna

Enna was a poet, a playwright, a journalist, and a prolific writer of detective novels and science fiction. He was best known as Franco Enna, but also wrote under his true name as well as many English pseudonyms, including Lou Happings, Andrew Maxwell, James Douglas, Thomas Freed, Richard Shell, Lewis Allen Scott, Herry Graham, Max Reditone, and Carlton Gibbs.

Much of his work was published in the science fiction magazine Urania. He became very well known among science fiction fans following the publication in Urania of his novel L'astro lebbroso in March 1955.

Enna's early detective novels were largely set in foreign locations, but in the 1970s he moved to more familiar Italian locales, notably in Mamma lupara ("Mother shotgun") published in 1972, and in the series of books about Federico Sartori. He came to be known as the writer who "provincialised" Italian crime fiction; Italo Calvino and Alberto Savinio had said that the Italian countryside could not be the background to a thriller, but Enna successfully wrote novels which refuted that. Enna used the format of a detective novel as an opportunity to show his view of the world. Sicily became the perfect setting to tell stories filled with intrigue and steeped in passion.

Enna's best known character was inspector Federico Sartori, a Sicilian police officer plagued by incurable nostalgia, who was led easily by adventure and by love through intricate and compelling stories. Around this character Franco Enna developed a wealth of fictional episodes which had considerable public success and earned him the nickname of "the Italian Simenon".
