= Giorgio Scerbanenco =

Italian writer

Giorgio Scerbanenco (Italian pronunciation: [ˈdʒordʒo ʃʃerbaˈnɛŋko]; Russian: Владимир Щербаненко, romanized: Vladimir Shcherbanenko; Ukrainian: Володимир Щербаненко, romanized: Volodymyr Shcherbanenko; 18 July 1911 – 27 October 1969) was a Ukrainian-born Italian crime fiction writer.

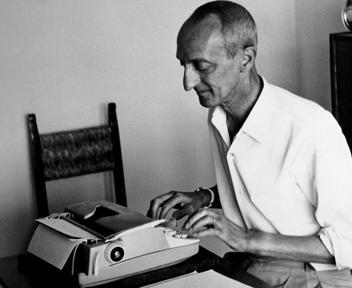
Giorgio Scerbanenco

== Life and works ==
Giorgio Scerbanenco was born in Kyiv, in what was then the Russian Empire. At an early age, his family immigrated to Rome (Scerbanenco's father was Ukrainian, his mother was Italian), and then he moved to Milan when he was 18 years old.

He found work as a freelance writer for many Italian magazines, chief among them Annabella before becoming a novelist. His first fiction books were detective novels set in the United States and clearly inspired by the works of Edgar Wallace and S.S. Van Dine, signed with an English-sounding pen name. While Scerbanenco wrote in several genres, he is famous in Italy for his crime and detective novels, many of which have been dramatized in Italian film and television . These include the series of novels with main character Duca Lamberti, a physician struck off the register for having performed euthanasia, and turned detective (Venere privata - A Private Venus, 1966; Traditori di tutti - Betrayers of All, 1966; I ragazzi del massacro - The Boys of the Massacre, 1968; I milanesi ammazzano al sabato - The Milanese kill on Saturday, 1969), as well as Sei giorni di preavviso (Six Days of Notice), his first novel. He died of a heart attack in Milan on 27 October 1969. As well as in Milan, the writer lived for a long period in Lignano Sabbiadoro, a town on the Adriatic Sea in Friuli-Venezia Giulia. The town holds his archive.

== Style ==
Scerbanenco was a frail, shy man, and his style was notable for the realistic way in which he conveyed and evoked the helplessness and despair of weak people being cruelly victimized.

His depiction of female characters is based on his years of experience answering the letters of women's magazine readers.

His virulent anti-communism stemmed from the trauma of losing his father during the Russian revolution, the trauma of exile and the meagre life in Rome which followed it. This political position hampered his critical success in Italy, but international critics (especially in France) praised him, despite Scerbanenco being considered nothing more than a genre writer in his homeland.

His writing, particularly in his best-known novels, is largely set in Milan, with little reference to other cities or regions of Italy. His works frequently portray the social tensions brought by rapid consumerism and urbanisation in Italy from the 1960s onward, using Milan and its working-class inhabitants as the primary backdrop.

== Honours ==
Asteroid 49441 Scerbanenco, discovered by astronomers at the San Vittore Observatory in 1998, was named in his memory. The official naming citation was published by the Minor Planet Center on 31 March 2018 (M.P.C. 109632).

== Film and television adaptations ==
- Naked Violence (I ragazzi del massacro), directed by Fernando Di Leo (1969)
- Cran d'arrêt, directed by Yves Boisset (1970)
- Death Occurred Last Night, directed by Duccio Tessari (1970)
- Caliber 9 (Milano calibro 9), directed by Fernando Di Leo (1972)
- The Italian Connection (La mala ordina), directed by Fernando Di Leo (1972)
- The Killer Must Kill Again (L'assassino è costretto ad uccidere ancora), directed by Luigi Cozzi (1975)
- Young, Violent, Dangerous (Liberi armati pericolosi), directed by Romolo Guerrieri (1976)
- Quattro delitti (TV film), directed by Alberto Siron, Gian Pietro Calasso and Vittorio Melloni (1979)
- La ragazza dell'addio (TV film), directed by Daniele D'Anza (1984)
- Appuntamento a Trieste (TV miniseries), directed by Bruno Mattei (1989)
- L'uomo che non voleva morire (TV film), directed by Lamberto Bava (1989)
- ¡Dispara!, directed by Carlos Saura (1993)
- Occhio di falco - serie TV serial, directed by Vittorio De Sisti (1996)
