= List of Italian films of 1969 =

A list of films produced in Italy in 1969 (see 1969 in film):

Italian films released in 1969
Title	Director	Cast	Genre	Notes
12 + 1	Nicolas Gessner, Luciano Lucignani	Sharon Tate, Vittorio Gassman, Orson Welles	comedy	Based on The Twelve Chairs
1943: un incontro	Alfredo Giannetti			Television movie
$20,000 Stained in Blood	Alberto Cardone	Brett Halsey, Germano Longo, Teresa Gimpera	Western	Spanish–Italian co-production
36 ore all'inferno	Roberto Bianchi Montero		Euro War	
5 per l'inferno	Gianfranco Parolini		Euro War	
99 Women	Jesús Franco	Maria Schell, Herbert Lom, Mercedes McCambridge	—N/a	Spanish–West German–Italian co-production
AAA bella presenza cercasi				
Addio, Alexandra				
Africa segreta			Mondo film	
Alive or Preferably Dead	Duccio Tessari		Western comedy	
Amarsi male				
Amore e rabbia				Entered into the 19th Berlin International Film Festival
Amore mio aiutami				
Apollon: una fabbrica occupata		Ugo Gregoretti, Gian Maria Volonté (narrator)	Documentary	
Army of Shadows	Jean-Pierre Melville	Lino Ventura, Simone Signoret, Paul Meurisse	—N/a	French-Italian co-production
Baltagul				
La bambola di Satana	Ferruccio Casapinta	Erna Schürer, Roland Carey, Aurora Batista	Horror	
Barbagia	Mircea Mureșan			
Battle of the Commandos	Umberto Lenzi	Jack Palance, Thomas Hunter, Curd Jürgens		
Beatrice Cenci				
Benito Cereno				
Bitka na Neretvi				
Block-notes di un regista				
Brucia, ragazzo, brucia				
A Bullet for Sandoval	Julio Buchs	George Hilton, Ernest Borgnine, Annabella Incontrera	Western	Spanish-Italian co-production
Burn!	Gillo Pontecorvo	Marlon Brando, Renato Salvatori	Politics, Historical	Dubbed and cut in its American release
C'era una volta un gangster				
Camille 2000				
Capricci				
The Castle of Fu Manchu	Jess Franco	Christopher Lee, Richard Greene, Howard Marion-Crawford		Spanish–West German–Italian co-production
Catherine				
Cemetery Without Crosses	Robert Hossein	Michèle Mercier, Robert Hossein, Guido Lollobrigida	Western	French–Italian co-production
Certo, certissimo, anzi... probabile				
Le Cerveau	Gérard Oury	Jean-Paul Belmondo, Bourvil, David Niven	Comedy	
Champagner für Zimmer 17				
Cinque figli di cane				
Colpo di stato				
Colpo grosso a Porto Said				
Colpo rovente				
Comando al infierno		Guy Madison	Euro war	
Come ti chiami, amore mio?				
Come, quando, perché				
Il Commissario Pepe	Ettore Scola	Ugo Tognazzi, Silvia Dionisio, Marianne Comtell	Comedy	
Corpi				
Cronaca				
Cuore di mamma	Salvatore Samperi			
Dal tuo al mio				
The Damned	Luchino Visconti	Ingrid Thulin, Helmut Berger, Dirk Bogarde	Drama	Italian-West German co-production
Death on a High Hill	Alfredo Medori	Peter lee Lawrence, Luis Davila, Antonio Gradoli	Western	Italian-Spanish co-production
Death Knocks Twice				
Death Knows No Time	León Klimovsky	Guglielmo Spoletini, Wayde Preston, Agnes Spaak	Western	Spanish-Italian co-production
Delitto al circolo del tennis				
Der Mann mit dem goldenen Pinsel				
Der verlogene Akt				
The Devil by the Tail	Philippe de Broca	Yves Montand, Madeleine Renaud, Maria Schell	Comedy	Co-production with France
Die Nichten der Frau Oberst. 2. Teil – Mein Bett ist meine Burg				
Dillinger Is Dead	Marco Ferreri	Michel Piccoli, Annie Girardot	Satire	Entered into the 1969 Cannes Film Festival
God Will Forgive My Gun	Mario Gariazzo Leopoldo Savona	Wayde Preston, Loredana Nusciak, José Torres	Western	
Dio è con noi				
Django the Bastard	Sergio Garrone	Anthony Steffen, Paolo Gozlino	Western	
Don Chisciotte e Sancio Panza				
Don Franco e Don Ciccio nell'anno della contestazione				
Donnerwetter! Donnerwetter! Bonifatius Kiesewetter				
Double Face	Riccardo Freda	Klaus Kinski, Christiane Krüger, Günther Stoll		Italian–West German co-production
Dov'è finito Herrmann Schneider?				
Dove vai tutta nuda?				
Due volte Giuda				
...e vennero in quattro per uccidere Sartana!	Demofilo Fidani	Jeff Cameron, Franco Ricci, Benito Pacifico	Western	
Ego				
Ein dreifach Hoch dem Sanitätsgefreiten Neumann				
El Zorro justiciero	Rafael Romero Marchent		Zorro film	
Eleonora Duse				
Entonce				
Eros e Thanatos				
Fellini Satyricon	Federico Fellini	Martin Potter, Hiram Keller	Drama	
Femina Ridens	Piero Schivazappa	Philippe Leroy, Dagmar Lassander	Thriller	
Femmine insaziabili				
The Five Man Army	Don Taylor, Italo Zingarelli	Peter Graves, Bud Spencer, Nino Castelnuovo	Western	
Flashback	Raffaele Andreassi	Fred Robsahm	Drama	
Franco e Ciccio sul sentiero di guerra				
Franco e Ciccio... ladro e guardia				
Franco, Ciccio e il pirata Barbanera				
Frontera al sur				
Fräulein Doktor	Alberto Lattuada	Suzy Kendall, Kenneth More	War spy	English language
Fuori gioco				
Fuoricampo				
Garringo	Rafael Romero Marchent	Anthony Steffen, Peter Lee Lawrence, Solvi Stubing	Western	Spanish-Italian co-production
Giovinezza, giovinezza				
Gli angeli del 2000				
Gli infermieri della mutua				
A Golden Widow	Michel Audiard	Michèle Mercier, Claude Rich, Roger Carel	Comedy	
H2S				
Hamelín	Luis María Delgado	Miguel Ríos	Fairy tale	Spanish co-production based on the Pied Piper of Hamelin
Hate Is My God	Claudio Gora	Luciano Stella, Claudio Giordana, Ella Karin	Western	Italian–German co-production
Heads or Tails	Piero Pierotti	John Ericson, Sheyla Rosin, Franco Lantieri	Western	
Hibernatus	Édouard Molinaro	Édouard Molinaro, Claude Gensac, Bernard Alane	Comedy	French–Italian co-production
Hora cero: Operación Rommel	León Klimovsky	Jack Palance	Eurowar	
House of Pleasure	Franz Antel	Teri Tordai, Claudio Brook, Margaret Lee, Edwige Fenech	Comedy	Co-production with Austria and West Germany
I am Sartana, Your Angel of Death	Giuliano Carnimeo	Gianni Garko, Frank Wolff, Klaus Kinski	Western	
I diavoli della guerra				
I due Kennedy	Gianni Bisiach		documentary	
I due magnifici fresconi				
I ragazzi del massacro				
I recuperanti				
Il cavaliere inesistente				
Il diario proibito di Fanny				
Il dito nella piaga				
Il gatto selvaggio				
Il giovane normale				
Il magnaccio				
Il padre di famiglia				
The Forgotten Pistolero	Ferdinando Baldi	Leonard Mann, Luciana Paluzzi, Peter Martell	Western	Italian-Spanish co-production
Il popolo calabrese ha rialzato la testa (Paola)				
Il primo premio si chiama Irene				
Il prof. Dott. Guido Tersilli, primario della clinica Villa Celeste convenzionata con le mutue				
Il rapporto				
Il sasso in bocca				
Il segreto di Luca				
Il seme dell'uomo				
Il suo modo di fare				
Il suo nome è Donna Rosa				
Il terribile ispettore				
Il tunnel sotto il mondo				
Immortalità				
In Search of Gregory				
Infanzia, vocazione e prime esperienze di Giacomo Casanova, veneziano				
Inghilterra nuda				
Interrabang	Giuliano Biagetti			
Intolerance: il caso Liuzzo				
Io e Dio				
Io, Emmanuelle				
Italiani in Antartide				
Italiani! È severamente proibito servirsi della toilette durante le fermate				
Jeff				
Josefine – das liebestolle Kätzchen				
Juliette de Sade				
Kampf um Rom II – Der Verrat				
Keene				
Kommissar X – Drei goldene Schlangen	Roberto Mauri			German co-production
Krasnaya palatka				
L'alibi				
L'altra faccia del peccato				
L'amante di Gramigna				
L'amica				
L'amore breve				
L'amore è come il sole				
L'amore, questo sconosciuto				
L'arbre de Noël				
L'arcangelo				
L'assoluto naturale				
L'invitata				
L'isola delle svedesi				
La bande à Bonnot				
La battaglia d'Inghilterra	Enzo G. Castellari		Eurowar	
La battaglia del deserto			Eurowar	
La battaglia del Sinai	Maurizio Lucidi	Franco Giornelli, Assi Dayan	War film	Italian–Israeli co-production
La battaglia dell'ultimo panzer				
The Battle of El Alamein	Giorgio Ferroni	Michael Rennie, Frederick Stafford, Enrico Maria Salerno	War film	
Boot Hill	Giuseppe Colizzi	Terence Hill, Bud Spencer, Woody Strode	Western	
The Ravine La cattura		David McCallum, Nicoletta Machiavelli	Eurowar	
La donna a una dimensione				
La donna invisibile				
La femme écarlate				
La legge dei gangsters				
La main				
La monaca di Monza				
La pelle a scacchi				
La piscine				
La resa dei conti: Dal gran consiglio al processo di Verona	Marco Leto	Franco Graziosi, Ivo Garrani		German co-production television film
La scoperta				
La Sicilia di Pirandello				
La stagione dei sensi				
La sua giornata di gloria	Edoardo Bruno			Entered into the 19th Berlin International Film Festival
La vie, l'amour, la mort	Claude Lelouch			French co-production
La voie lactée				
Las trompetas del apocalipsis	Julio Buchs	Brett Halsey, Marilù Tolo		
Lawrence d'Arabia	Giuseppe Fina	Ugo Pagliai		Italian TV film based on a play by Terence Rattigan
Le 10 meraviglie dell'amore				
Le altre				
Le calde notti di Poppea	Guido Malatesta	Brad Harris, Olga Schoberová	Sword-and-sandal sex comedy	
Le guerillero ou celui qui n'y croyait pas				
Le malizie di Venere				
Le sorelle				
Le voleur de crimes				
Legge della violenza – Tutti o nessuno			Western	
Les chemins de Katmandou				
Les Femmes	Jean Aurel	Brigitte Bardot, Maurice Ronet, Tanya Lopert	—N/a	French-Italian co-production
Les gros malins				
Les étrangers				
Lesbo				
Lisa dagli occhi blu				
Los desesperados				
Lovemaker				
Machine Gun McCain	Giuliano Montaldo	John Cassavetes, Britt Ekland	Crime	
Madame Bovary				
The Magnificent Bandits	Giovanni Fago	Tomas Milian, Ugo Pagliai, Eduardo Fajardo	Western	Italian-Spanish co-production
Malenka				
Marquis de Sade: Justine	Jesús Franco	Klaus Kinski, Romina Power, Maria Rohm	—N/a	West German-Italian co-production
Medea	Pier Paolo Pasolini	Maria Callas, Massimo Girotti, Laurent Terzieff		Italian-French-West German co-production
Mercanti di vergini				
Metti una sera a cena	Giuseppe Patroni Griffi	Jean-Louis Trintignant	Drama	
The Milky Way	Luis Buñuel	Paul Frankeur, Laurent Terzieff, Alain Cuny	—N/a	French–Italian co-production
Mille peccati... nessuna virtù				
Mississippi Mermaid	François Truffaut	Catherine Deneuve, Jean-Paul Belmondo	Drama	French-Italian co-production
Monte Carlo or Bust!	Ken Annakin			International co-production
Ms. Stiletto	Bruno Corbucci	Brigitte Skay, Mimmo Palmara, Fred Williams	Drama	Italian–West German co-production
My Uncle Benjamin	Édouard Molinaro	Jacques Brel, Claude Jade, Bernard Alane	Historical comedy	Co-production with Italy
Nathalie après l'amour				
Nel labirinto del sesso (Psichidion)				
Nell'anno del Signore				
Nell'anno della luna				
Nero Wolfe: Circuito chiuso				Television movie
Nero Wolfe: Il patto dei sei				Television movie
Nero Wolfe: Il pesce più grosso				Television movie
Nero Wolfe: Per la fama di Cesare				Television movie
Nero Wolfe: Un incidente di caccia				Television movie
Nero Wolfe: Veleno in sartoria				Television movie
Nerosubianco	Tinto Brass			
No importa morir	León Klimovsky	Tab Hunter	Eurowar	
A Noose for Django	Sergio Garrone	Anthony Steffen, William Berger, Riccardo Garrone	Western	
La notte dei serpenti	Giulio Petroni	Luke Askew, Luigi Pistilli, Magda Konopka	Western	
Oh dolci baci e languide carezze				
Ora X – pattuglia suicida	Gaetano Quartararo	Pierre Richard	Eurowar	
Orgasmo	Umberto Lenzi	Carroll Baker, Lou Castel, Colette Descombes		
Pagine chiuse				
Pagó cara su muerte				
Passa Sartana... è l'ombra della tua morte	Demofilo Fidani	Jeff Cameron, Benito Pacifici, Frank Fargas	Western	
Pelle di bandito	Piero Livi			
Pensando a te				
Pensiero d'amore				
Pigsty	Pier Paolo Pasolini	Jean-Pierre Léaud, Marco Ferreri, Ugo Tognazzi	—N/a	Italian-French co-production
La Piscine	Jacques Deray	Alain Delon, Romy Schneider, Maurice Ronet	Drama	French-Italian co-production
Plagio	Sergio Capogna			
Playgirl 70				
Porta del cannone	Leopoldo Savona	Gianni Garko	Eurospy Eurowar	
The Price of Power	Tonino Valerii	Giuliano Gemma	Western	
Probabilità zero	Maurizio Lucidi	Henry Silva	Eurowar	
Psychic Lover				
Puro siccome un angelo papà mi fece monaco... di Monza				
Quarta parete				
del Pater Noster	Ruggero Deodato	Paolo Villaggio, Lino Toffolo, Enrico Montesano	Western	
Quel giorno Dio non c'era				
Quella dannata pattuglia	Roberto Bianchi Montero	Dale Cummings, Maurice Poli	War	
Quintana: Dead or Alive	Vincenzo Musolino	Osvaldo Ruggeri, Femi Benussi, Ignazio Spalla	Western	
Quinto: non ammazzare	León Klimovsky	Giuseppe Cardillo, Germán Cobos, Sarah Ross	Western	Spanish–Italian co-production
Rapporto Fuller, base Stoccolma				
Realtà romanzesca				
Rebecca				
Rebus			Crime	
Revenge				
The Reward's Yours... The Man's Mine	Edoardo Mulargia	Robert Woods, Maurizio Bonuglia, Marc Fiorini	Western	Italian-Spanish co-production
Ruba al prossimo tuo				
Sabata	Gianfranco Parolini	Lee Van Cleef	Western	
Sai cosa faceva Stalin alle donne?				
Le salamandre	Alberto Cavallone	Erna Schürer, Beryl Cunningham, Antonio Casale		
Salvare la faccia				
Scacco alla regina				
Sedia elettrica				
Senza sapere niente di lei				
Sette baschi rossi	Mario Siciliano	Ivan Rassimov, Piero Liviband	Eurowar mercenary film	German co-production
Shoot Twice	Nando Cicero	Klaus Kinski, Antonio Sabato, Cristina Galbó, José Calvo	Western	Italian–Spanish co-production
Sierra Maestra				
Simón Bolívar				
So Sweet... So Perverse	Umberto Lenzi	Carroll Baker, Jean-Louis Trintignant, Erika Blanc		Italian–French–West German co-production
Sotto il segno dello scorpione				
The Specialists	Sergio Corbucci	Johnny Hallyday, Gastone Moschin, Mario Adorf	Western	Italian–French–German co-production
Strada senza uscità				
Su sambene non est aba				
Sundance and the Kid	Duccio Tessari	Giuliano Gemma, Nino Benvenuti, Sydne Rome	Western	Italian–Spanish co-production
Tarzana, sesso selvaggio	Guido Malatesta		Jungle adventure	
Tarzán en la gruta del oro	Manuel Caño	Steve Hawkes, Kitty Swan	Jungle adventure	
Tepepa	Giulio Petroni	Tomas Milian, Orson Welles, John Steiner	Western	Italian–Spanish co-production
This Man Must Die	Claude Chabrol	Michel Duchaussoy, Jean Yanne, Caroline Cellier	—N/a	French-Italian co-production
Tiempos de Chicago				
Togli le gambe dal parabrezza				
Toh, è morta la nonna!				
Top Sensation				
Trapianto, consunzione e morte di Franco Brocani				
Tropici				
Uccidete Rommel			War movie	
Un bellissimo novembre				
Un cappello pieno di pioggia				
Un certo giorno				
Un detective				
Un homme qui me plaît				
Un posto all'inferno		Guy Madison	Eurowar	
Un sudario a la medida				
Un tranquillo posto di campagna	Elio Petri			Won a Silver Bear at the 19th Berlin International Film Festival
Una breve stagione				
Una lunga fila di croci				
Una ragazza di Praga				
Una storia d'amore	Michele Lupo	Anna Moffo, Gianni Macchia, Jean Claudio, Alicia Brandet, Beryl Cunningham, Claudie Lange, Jacques Herlin		
Una sull'altra				
Une fille nommée Amour				
The Unfaithful Wife	Claude Chabrol	Stéphane Audran, Michel Bouquet, Maurice Ronet	—N/a	French-Italian co-production
The Unnaturals	Antonio Margheriti	Joachim Fuchsberger. Marianne Koch, Helga Anders		
Uno scacco tutto matto				
Vedo nudo				
Venus in Furs	Jesús Franco, Hans Billian	James Darren, Barbara McNair, Maria Rohm	—N/a	West German-Italian co-production
Vergogna schifosi				
Viaje al vacío				
Vieni, dolce morte	Mario Caiano	Tony Kendall, Claudine Auger		
Vita segreta di una diciottenne				
Vita selvaggia, selvaggia terra				
Warum hab ich bloß 2 x ja gesagt?				
The Wedding Trip				
Yellow: le cugine				
Zenabel	Ruggero Deodato	Lucretia Love, Lionel Stander, Mauro Parenti		
Space Mission: Zero Hour				
Zingara				
Zorro in the Court of England	Francesco Montemurro	Spiros Focás, Carol Wells, Daniele Vargas	Western	
Zorro the Conqueror	José Luis Merino	Charles Quiney, Maria Pia Conte, José Jaspe	Western	Spanish–Italian co-production
Zorro, the Navarra Marquis	Francesco Montemurro	Nadir Moretti, Malisa Longo, Daniele Vargas	Western	
Zum, zum, zum n° 2				
¡Viva América!				
