= Il dio serpente =

- Directed by: Piero Vivarelli
- Written by: Piero Vivarelli; Giorgio Arlorio
- Produced by: Alfredo Bini
- Starring: Nadia Cassini
- Cinematography: Benito Frattari
- Music by: Augusto Martelli
- Release date: 28 November 1970
- Running time: 94 minutes
- Country: Italy
- Language: Italian

Il dio serpente (transl. The snake god) is a 1970 Italian erotic fantasy film directed by Piero Vivarelli and featuring Italian-based American actress Nadia Cassini in her first lead role. The film is an earlier example of voodoo (and later zombie) themed sexploitation films shot in Colombia by Italian directors. The theme song of the film, "Djamballà" by Augusto Martelli, reached the first position in the Italian hit parade.

== Plot ==
Paola is in a deteriorating marriage with Bernard. After the couple move to an island in the Caribbean, Paola befriends a local woman named Stella who introduces her to the cult of the serpent god Djamballà. Paola, first despising the rituals of the cult, soon realises that they represent the passion and lust lacking in her married life. At a ritual where reality is interspersed within fantasy, Paola has sex with a strong black man she identifies with the serpent god himself. After her husband's sudden death, she invites her former lover Tony to the island to start a new life but understands that Djamballà has become her sole obsession.

== Cast ==
- Nadia Cassini as Paola
- Beryl Cunningham as Stella
- Sergio Tramonti as Tony
- Galeazzo Bentivoglio as Bernard
- Arnoldo Palacios as Witch Man
- Juana Sobreda
- Claudio Trionfi as Priest
- Evaristo Marquez as Djamballà
- Koike Mahoco

== Production ==
Director Piero Vivarelli said a sex scene played by Nadia Cassini was not simulated: "I had told Evaristo Marquez, the actor who had a torrid scene with her, to act like everything was real. And I think that's what happened. Besides, Cassini didn't mind."
