= Lucien Lemoine =

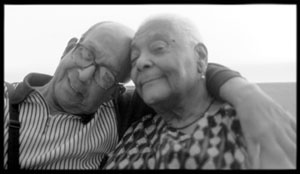
- Lucien Lemoine with his wife, Jacqueline Scott-Lemoine
- Born: December 19, 1923; Jacmel, Haiti
- Died: January 13, 2010 (aged 86); Dakar, Senegal
- Occupations: Director, actor, poet, radio host

Lucien Lemoine (December 19, 1923 – January 13, 2010) was a Haitian-Senegalese stage director, actor, poet, and radio host. Born in Haiti, he fled the dictatorship of François Duvalier and settled in Senegal, where he became a citizen.

He was married to the actress and writer Jacqueline Scott-Lemoine.

== Early life and exile in Paris ==
Lucien Lemoine was born in 1923 in Jacmel, Haiti. He began his theater career in his home country. In the early 1960s, he emigrated to Paris, where he met his future wife, actress Jacqueline Scott. A fellow Haitian expatriate, she had settled in Paris in 1962 after fleeing the François Duvalier regime. The couple married on July 15, 1964, at the Haitian Embassy in Paris, with the writer Aimé Césaire as their witness.

== Theater career in Europe and Africa ==
In 1966, Lucien Lemoine and Jacqueline Scott-Lemoine traveled to Senegal with Jean-Marie Serreau's theater troupe, of which they were both members, to perform at the first World Festival of Black Arts. Lemoine played the Baron de Vastey, while his wife played the Queen, in Aimé Césaire's 1963 play La Tragédie du roi Christophe. The piece had been a resounding success in Europe, notably in Salzburg, but its premiere at Dakar's Daniel Sorano National Theater brought it to new heights and was attended by such important figures as Emperor Haile Selassie, Josephine Baker, André Malraux, James Baldwin, and Cheikh Anta Diop, among others. Lemoine was profoundly marked by this experience as an actor, as he relates in his book Douta Seck ou La tragédie du roi Christophe.

== Emigration to Senegal ==
At the end of the World Festival of Black Arts, at Lemoine's request, Senegalese President Léopold Sédar Senghor offered him political asylum. Lemoine and his wife settled in the country, where they would obtain citizenship in 1976.

Living in Dakar, Lemoine became involved in the city's cultural milieu and produced various plays, directing his wife on various occasions. He also appeared in the 1972 film The Black Decameron. He worked as a journalist at Radiodiffusion Télévision Sénégalaise, chronicling the trajectory of African theater, where he notably hosted the program La voix des poètes with his wife for 12 years, making the couple well known among the general public. They also taught journalism students at the Centre d'études des sciences et techniques de l'information (CESTI), and Lemoine created theater workshops in partnership with the Daniel Sorano National Theater's director Ousmane Diakhaté.

== Death and legacy ==
Lemoine worked closely throughout his professional career with his wife, linking them inextricably. On his death in 2010, in Dakar, the poet Amadou Lamine Sall honored him by declaring, "Far, far in the future, our children and grandchildren will discover a woman and a man who occupied the only human spaces that are not for sale but must be conquered: the mind and the thought." Lemoine-Scott died a year after his death.
