= Your Hands on My Body =

- Directed by: Brunello Rondi
- Starring: Lino Capolicchio
- Cinematography: Alessandro D'Eva
- Edited by: Michele Massimo Tarantini
- Music by: Giorgio Gaslini
- Release date: 1970
- Country: Italy
- Language: Italian

Le tue mani sul mio corpo (translation: Your Hands on My Body), a.k.a. Schocking, is a 1970 Italian giallo film directed by Brunello Rondi.

== Plot ==
A young neurotic dedicates his life to harassing others, especially his father and stepmother. Not even an encounter with a beautiful girl manages to keep him away from his world of macabre fantasies.

== Cast ==
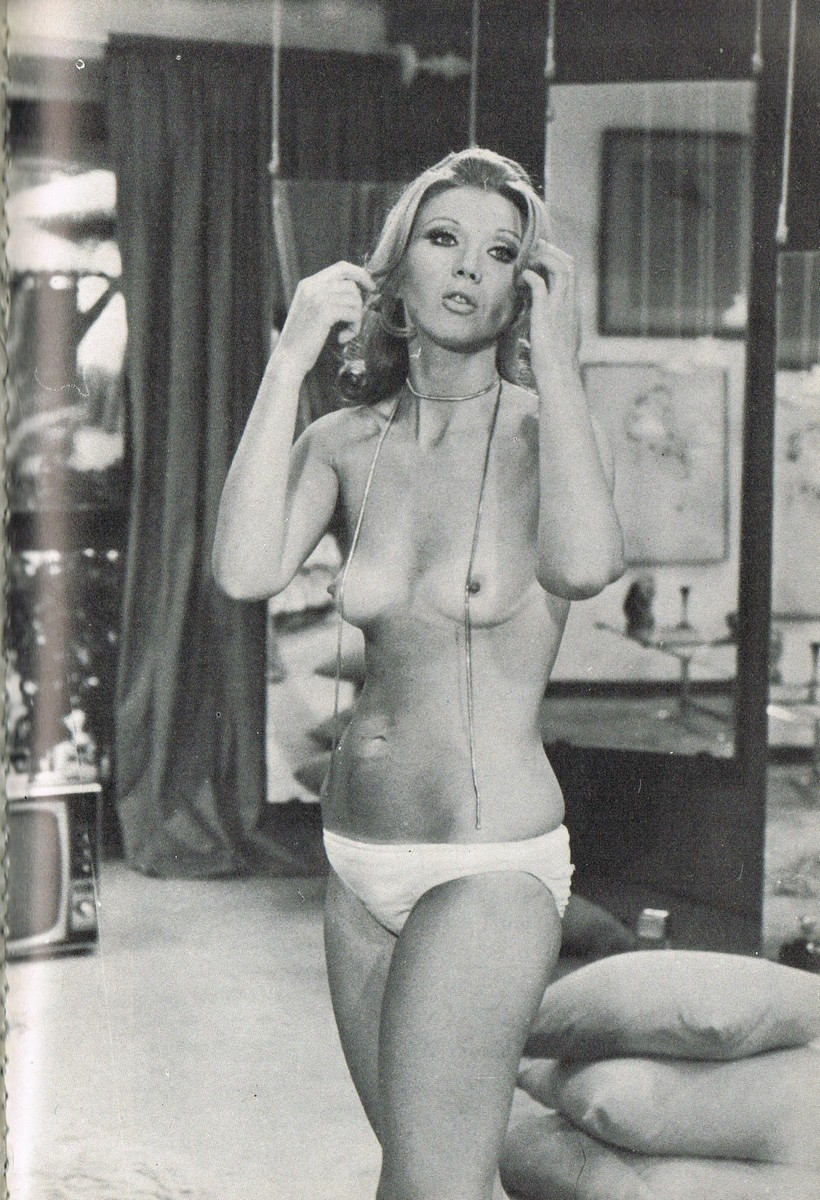
Erna Schürer in the film

- Lino Capolicchio as Andrea
- Colette Descombes as Carole
- Erna Schürer as Mireille
- José Quaglio as Mario
- Pier Paola Bucchi as Clara, the maid
- Anne Marie Braafheid as Nivel
- Elena Cotta
