= More Dollars for the MacGregors =

1970 film

- Directed by: José Luis Merino
- Written by: Arrigo Colombo; Enrico Colombo; María del Carmen Martínez Román; José Luis Merino
- Starring: Peter Lee Lawrence; Carlos Quiney; Malisa Longo
- Cinematography: Emanuele Di Cola
- Edited by: Sandro Lena; José Antonio Rojo
- Music by: Augusto Martelli
- Production companies: Prodimex Film; Órbita Films
- Distributed by: Variety Distribution
- Release date: 27 September 1970
- Running time: 99 minutes
- Countries: Italy; Spain
- Languages: Italian; Spanish

More Dollars for the MacGregors (Italian: Ancora dollari per i MacGregor, Spanish: La muerte busca un hombre) is a 1970 Spaghetti Western film directed by José Luis Merino and starring Peter Lee Lawrence, Carlos Quiney and Malisa Longo.

== Cast ==
- Peter Lee Lawrence as Robert McGregor / Blondie
- Carlos Quiney as George Forsyte
- Malisa Longo as Yuma
- Stelvio Rosi as Ross Steward
- Mariano Vidal Molina as Joe Saxon
- María Salerno as Maticha
- María Mahor as Gladys McGregor
- Luis Marín as Pancho
- Antonio Mayans as Young Man after Saxon
- Dan van Husen as Frank Landon
- Antonio Jiménez Escribano as Old Tradesman
- José Jaspe as Sheriff of Jonesville
- José Marco as Debuty sheriff
- Stefano Caprioti
- Enrique Ávila
- Giancarlo Fantini
- Enzo Fisichella
- Renato Paracchi
- Santiago Rivero
- Claudio Trionfi

== Bibliography ==
- Thomas Weisser. Spaghetti Westerns--the Good, the Bad and the Violent: A Comprehensive, Illustrated Filmography of 558 Eurowesterns and Their Personnel, 1961-1977. McFarland, 2005.
