= Zenabel =

- Italian film poster
- Directed by: Ruggero Deodato
- Screenplay by: Antonio Racioppi; Gino Capone; Ruggero Deodato
- Story by: Antonio Racioppi; Gino Capone
- Starring: Lucretia Love; Lionel Stander; Mauro Parenti
- Cinematography: Roberto Reale
- Edited by: Antonietta Zita
- Music by: Bruno Nicolai
- Production companies: I.C.A.R.; Gemini Pictures International; Pierson Production
- Release date: December 1969 (Italy)
- Running time: 90 minutes
- Countries: Italy; France

Zenabel is a 1969 film directed by Ruggero Deodato.

== Plot ==
The film is set in 1627 and is about a young woman named Zenabel (Lucretia Love) who finds out that she is the daughter of a Duke who was killed by the Spanish Baron Imolne. Zenabel gathers a group of women to lead them to fight against Imolne to exact revenge.

== Cast ==
- Lucretia Love as Zenabel
- John Ireland as Don Alonso Imolne
- Lionel Stander as Pancrazio
- Mauro Parenti as Gennaro
- Fiorenzo Fiorentini as Cecco
- Elisa Mainardi as Zenabel's friend
- Luigi Leoni as Baldassarre
- Andrea Scotti as Don Carlos
- Dada Gallotti as Carmelita
- Ignazio Leone as Guard

== Production ==
Zenabel was directed by Ruggero Deodato to work again with producer and actor Mauro Parenti, who he had worked with previously on Phenomenal and the Treasure of Tutankhamen. The title role was given to Lucretia Love, Parenti's wife at the time, and Parenti also demanded an acting role for himself, and was given that of the bandit Gennaro. John Ireland played the role of the villain Baron Alfonso Imolde.

The film was shot in Bracciano in Rome and Tuscania. Deodato recalls during a scene in Tuscania's main square where Love's character is about to be burned alive, John Ireland was missing. Ireland was at the Hilton Hotel in Rome waiting for his check as the producer had not paid him yet. When Ireland arrived on set, he refused to give an act in a scene that was to give the signal to light Zenabel aflame. Ireland refused to act not knowing the character's motivation, which led to Deodato giving him a dwarf actor in his arms like a baby to light to signal which pleased Ireland and let him complete the scene.

== Release ==
Zenabel was released in Italy in December 1969. Italian film critic and historian Roberto Curti stated that the film was a "financial disaster" in Italy as it was released during the same week as the Piazza Fontana bombing. Deodato later stated that he put his "heart and soul into Zenabel, but the film was affected by the lack of a popular lead actress."

The film was re-released in France in 1975 under the title La Furie du Desir with hardcore pornography scenes added. These scenes were directed by Claude Mulot.

== Reception ==
In a retrospective overview of Deodato's career, Louis Paul, author of Italian Horror Film Directors, stated that Zenabel was "Deodato's first film where he exhibits a unique persona as director".

== See also ==
- List of Italian films of 1969
- List of French films of 1969
- Ms. Stiletto (1969)
