= Giorgio Cristallini =

Italian screenwriter and film director

- Born: 26 June 1921; Perugia, Italy
- Died: 2 December 1999 (aged 78); Tavernelle, Italy
- Occupations: Screenwriter, film director
- Years active: 1942-1978 (film)

Giorgio Cristallini (June 26, 1921 – December 2, 1999) was an Italian screenwriter and film director.

== Selected filmography ==
- Operation Mitra (1951)
- Legions of the Nile (1959)
- Samson and His Mighty Challenge (1964)
- La bambola di Satana (1969)
- Seagulls Fly Low (1978)

== Bibliography ==
- Roberto Curti. Italian Gothic Horror Films, 1957-1969. McFarland, 2015.
