= Valerie Inside Outside =

- Directed by: Brunello Rondi
- Cinematography: Claudio Racca
- Music by: Franco Bixio
- Release date: 1972
- Country: Italy
- Language: Italian

Valerie Inside Outside (Italian: Valeria dentro e fuori) is a 1972 Italian drama film written and directed by Brunello Rondi.

== Cast ==
- Barbara Bouchet: Valeria Rocchi
- Pier Paolo Capponi: David Rocchi
- Erna Schürer: Evi
- Umberto Raho: Dr. Vannutelli
- Maria Mizar: Nun
- Rosemarie Lindt: Psychiatrist
- Claudio Gora: "The Baron"
