= 36 China Town =

- Theatrical release poster
- Directed by: Abbas–Mustan
- Written by: Shyam Goel
- Based on: Once upon a Crime (1992) and Crimen (1960)
- Produced by: Subhash Ghai
- Starring: Akshaye Khanna; Kareena Kapoor Khan; Shahid Kapoor; Upen Patel; Paresh Rawal; Johnny Lever
- Cinematography: Ravi Yadav
- Edited by: Hussain A. Burmawala
- Music by: Songs: Himesh Reshammiya; Score: Salim–Sulaiman
- Production company: Mukta Arts
- Distributed by: Tips Industries
- Release date: 5 May 2006
- Running time: 134 minutes
- Country: India
- Language: Hindi
- Budget: ₹19 crore
- Box office: ₹38 crore

36 China Town is a 2006 Indian Hindi-language mystery comedy thriller film directed by Abbas–Mustan and produced by Subhash Ghai. It is an official adaptation of the 1992 American film Once upon a Crime (which in turn is a remake of the 1960 Italian film Crimen). The film stars an ensemble cast, including Akshaye Khanna, Kareena Kapoor Khan, Shahid Kapoor, Upen Patel (in his debut), Paresh Rawal, Payal Rohatgi, Johnny Lever and Tannaz Irani. Priyanka Chopra and Isha Koppikar make cameo appearances. The film follows the investigation of a police officer trying to find the killer of a wealthy casino owner, Sonia Chang in China Town.

== Plot ==
The only child of millionaire Sonia Chang, Vicky, has been kidnapped. To get her son back, she puts out a reward of 25 lakh rupees. She lives in her huge mansion named "36 China Town" in Goa with a housekeeper couple, Mr. and Mrs. Lobo. Sonia is consoled by Rocky, a local and the famous playboy of China Town.

Raj, a struggling actor, and Priya, who ran away from home, have a serendipitous encounter with each other. They find a child who appears to be all alone in Mumbai. They take pity on him, but after seeing a missing persons advertisement, they realise that the child is the son of Sonia Chang. Tempted by the reward money, they team up and decide to bring the child back home. Before leaving, they call Chang and tell her that they have her child. She was discussing the change in her will with her lawyer, Mr. Dixit, when the duo informed her. Meanwhile, Raj starts falling in love with Priya.

Raj and Priya come to Goa, where they run into a drunkard loitering near Sonia's mansion. The drunkard runs away on seeing them. They are horrified to see Sonia dead. The duo run, but realize that the child is left behind inside the mansion. Raj enters the mansion again to take him. He sees two eyes and legs behind a cupboard. Terrified, he gets out of the mansion with the child. Raj and Priya then inform Goa police about the murder. Raj and Priya go back to the mansion to take her suitcase. Raj is arrested by Inspector Karan. Raj refuses to name Priya as an accomplice. She takes Vicky to a church to drop him off but is seen by Rocky with the kid. Rocky calls the police and Priya also gets arrested and sent to jail. Priya and Raj become the prime suspects in the murder. Inside the jail, they both fall for each other.

Karan calls Rocky to the police station. But seeing Rocky's eyes, Raj recollects that it was Rocky's eyes and shoes which he had seen behind the cupboard. Rocky then says that he was in another room that night. He had found Sonia already murdered. Panicked, he was about to get out of the house when Raj and Priya entered and started searching for Sonia. Karan is able to reconstruct what actually happened that night based on Mr. Dixit's statement about the will and everybody's statement. First, he procures the drunkard, whom Raj and Priya believe to be the murderer. But Karan goes on to explain that he is, in fact, the kidnapper.

Karan explains that the kidnapper was hired by the killer, but the kidnapper lost the child, who was then found by Raj and Priya in Mumbai. After Sonia is informed about the child's discovery, the killer murdered Sonia, while other people incriminated themselves through circumstances. The real killers are Mr. and Mrs. Lobo. According to Sonia Chang's initial will, after her death, the person who was most close to her son (which were her housekeepers) would inherit everything, but then one day she found out about their evil intentions and decided to change her will, which led to them murdering her.

Raj and Priya are given custody of Vicky. Rocky as usual, tries to hit on a girl but it is revealed to be Karan's wife. Later everyone in the end have fun and dinner in China Town.

== Cast ==
- Akshaye Khanna as Chief Inspector Karan Kapoor
- Shahid Kapoor as Raj Malhotra
- Kareena Kapoor as Priya Singhania
- Paresh Rawal as Natwar Lal
- Payal Rohatgi as Gracy, Natwar's wife
- Johnny Lever as KK
- Tannaz Irani as Ruby, KK's wife
- Upen Patel as Rocky, the playboy of china town
- Dinyar Contractor as Mr. Lobo
- Roshan Tirandaaz as Mrs. Lobo
- Raj Zutshi as Drunkard / Contract killer
- Vivek Vaswani as Mr. Dixit, Sonia's lawyer
- Vivek Shauq as Inspector Ravi
- Isha Koppikar as Sonia Chang (special appearance)
- Priyanka Chopra as Seema Kapoor, Karan's wife (special appearance)
- Tanushree Dutta as Ayesha Dutta (special appearance)
- Sambhavna Seth as Simran, Rocky's girlfriend
- Preeti Puri as Rosy
- Nassar Abdullah as Raj's father

== Awards and nominations ==
Won

- IIFA Awards for Best Debutant (Male) – Upen Patel
- Zee Cine Award for Best Male Debut – Upen Patel
- Global Indian Film Awards for Best Debut Actor – Upen Patel

Nominated

- Filmfare Award for Best Female Playback Singer – Sunidhi Chauhan for "Aashiqui Mein Teri"
- Star Screen Award for Most Promising Newcomer (Male) – Upen Patel

== Soundtrack ==
36 China Town

Soundtrack album by Himesh Reshammiya
- Released: April 21, 2006
- Recorded: 2005–2006
- Venue: Mumbai
- Genre: Feature film soundtrack
- Language: Hindi
- Label: Tips Music
- Producer: Himesh Reshammiya

Himesh Reshammiya chronology
Tom Dick And Harry (2006)	36 China Town (2006)	Humko Deewana Kar Gaye (2006)

The music was composed by Himesh Reshammiya, with lyrics penned by Sameer. The music was released by Tips Music. According to the Indian trade website Box Office India, with around 12,00,000 units sold, this film's soundtrack album was the year's ninth highest-selling.

The song "Aashiqui Mein Teri" was remade as "Aashiqui Mein Teri 2.0" for Reshammiya's 2020 film Happy Hardy and Heer and is performed by Reshammiya and singer Ranu Mondal.

=== Track listing ===
No.	Title	Singer(s)	Length
1.	"24x7 I Think of You"	Shaan, Sunidhi Chauhan	5:13
2.	"Aashiqui Mein Teri"	Himesh Reshammiya, Sunidhi Chauhan	4:53
3.	"Badi Dilchaspi Hai"	K. K., Arya	5:26
4.	"Dil Tumhare Bina"	Himesh Reshammiya, Alka Yagnik	5:23
5.	"Jab Kabhi"	Kunal Ganjawala, Alka Yagnik	5:21
6.	"24x7 I Think of You (DJ Akbar Sami Remix)"	Sunidhi Chauhan, Shaan	4:16
7.	"Aashiqui Mein Teri (DJ Akbar Sami Remix)"	Himesh Reshammiya, Sunidhi Chauhan	4:16
8.	"Badi Dilchaspi Hai (Remix by DJ Akbar Sami)"	K. K., Arya	4:08
9.	"Dil Tumhare Bina (Remix by DJ Akbar Sami)"	Himesh Reshammiya, Sunidhi Chauhan	4:51
10.	"Jab Kabhi (Remix by DJ Suketu)"	Kunal Ganjawala	3:02
11.	"Jab Kabhi (Remix by DJ Akbar Sami)"	Kunal Ganjawala, Alka Yagnik	5:02
