= Master of Love =

1972 comedy film

- Directed by: Brunello Rondi
- Written by: Roberto Leoni; Franco Bucceri; Brunello Rondi
- Produced by: Oscar Brazzi
- Starring: Rossano Brazzi; Tina Aumont; Janet Agren; Barbara Bouchet; Magali Noël
- Cinematography: Luciano Trasatti
- Edited by: Marcello Malvestito
- Music by: Stelvio Cipriani
- Release date: 1972
- Country: Italy
- Language: Italian

Master of Love (Italian: Racconti proibiti... di niente vestiti, lit. 'Forbidden tales ... of bare tails', also known as Decameron Sinners) is a 1972 commedia sexy all'italiana co-written and directed by Brunello Rondi.

== Cast ==
- Rossano Brazzi as Lorenzo del Cambio
- Tina Aumont as Dirce
- Janet Agren as Maddalena
- Barbara Bouchet as Lucrezia degli Uberti
- Magali Noël as Prudenzia
- Silvia Monti as Felicita
- Enzo Cerusico as Romeo
- Leopoldo Trieste as Fiora's husband
- Mario Carotenuto as Friar Bernardone
- Didi Perego as Giulietta
- Venantino Venantini as the soldier from Sicily
- Karin Schubert as the peasant woman
- Monica Strebel as the Death
- Ben Ekland as Uccio
- Antonio Falsi as Sarnacchione di Casteltroia
- Michael Forrest as Bastianazzo
- Lydia Brazzi as sora Amalia
- Renato Malavasi as Giappo de' Guidacci
- Marisa Traversi as the Prioress

== Production ==
Principal photography started on 26 July 1972. The film initially had the working title Maestro d'amore ("Master of Love"), which was intended by Rondi as an hommage to Ingmar Bergman's A Lesson in Love. The title was changed by producer Oscar Brazzi (main actor Rossano Brazzi's brother), who also actively interfered with scripting, shooting and editing, even going so far as to shoot on his own some additional sex scenes that were not in the script, causing Rondi to leave the set in protest. Set in Tuscany in the Renaissance age, it was shot in San Gimignano.

== Release ==
The film was released in Italian cinemas by Panta on 12 October 1972.

== Reception ==
In spite of its high-profile cast, domestically the film was a bomb, grossing less than 100 million lire. It was generally badly received by critics.
