= Spell – Dolce mattatoio =

- Directed by: Alberto Cavallone
- Screenplay by: Alberto Cavallone
- Story by: Alberto Cavallone
- Starring: Paola Montenero; Jane Avril; Monica Ronchi; Martial Boschero; Giovanni De Angelis
- Cinematography: Gianni Bonicelli
- Edited by: Alberto Cavallone
- Production company: Stefano Film
- Distributed by: Stefano Film
- Release date: 20 May 1977 (Italy)
- Country: Italy

Spell – Dolce mattatoio (transl. Spell – Sweet Abattoir) is a 1977 Italian film directed by Alberto Cavallone.

== Production ==
The sequence with Mónica Zanchi lying on the pool table with her legs spread (her vulva is explicitly seen) was shot in a real bar, very unwillingly; the actress demanded the presence only of the male actor and a cameraman.

== Release ==
Spell was distributed in Italy by Stefano Film on 20 May 1977 as Spell – Dolce mattatoio (transl. Spell – Sweet Abattoir). After a short run in Italy, it was released as L'uomo, la donna e la bestia (transl. The Man, the Woman and the Beast) to capitalize on the popularity of Walerian Borowczyk's La Bête. Cavallone commented on the re-titling of the film as "very irritating" and that the re-release was "definitely a shitty title."

== Reception ==
In contemporary reviews, Leonardo Autera of Corriere della Sera stated that the film was "redundant, clunky, and amateurishly acted and ultimately, lacking any semblance of style"

== See also ==
- List of Italian films of 1977
