= Erika Wallner =

Argentine actress

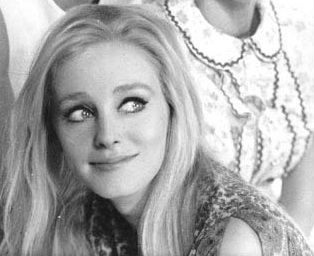
- Born: 2 September 1941; Buenos Aires, Argentina
- Died: 26 August 2016 (aged 74); Buenos Aires, Argentina
- Other name: Erica Frauwallner
- Occupation: Actress
- Years active: 1960–2016

Erika Wallner (2 September 1941 – 26 August 2016) was an Argentine actress.

Wallner died from kidney failure at Sanatorio de La Providencia in Buenos Aires, Argentina, on 26 August 2016, at age 74.

== Selected filmography ==
- Forty Degrees in the Shade (1967)
- Story of a Poor Young Man (1968)
- Bridge Over the Elbe (1969)

== Bibliography ==
- Peter Cowie & Derek Elley. World Filmography: 1967. Fairleigh Dickinson University Press, 1977.
