= Crimen (film) =

1960 film

- Directed by: Mario Camerini
- Written by: Rodolfo Sonego; Luciano Vincenzoni; Giorgio Arlorio
- Produced by: Dino De Laurentiis
- Starring: Vittorio Gassman; Nino Manfredi; Alberto Sordi
- Cinematography: Gianni Di Venanzo
- Music by: Pino Calvi
- Release date: 1960
- Running time: 108 minutes 124 minutes (Italian cut)
- Country: Italy
- Language: Italian

Crimen (also known as ...And Suddenly It's Murder! and Killing in Monte Carlo) is a 1960 Italian whodunit comedy movie by Mario Camerini.

The movie had three remakes: Io non vedo, tu non parli, lui non sente directed by Mario Camerini in 1971 and starred Gastone Moschin, Enrico Montesano and Alighiero Noschese, and Once Upon a Crime, in 1992, directed by Eugene Levy and starred John Candy and James Belushi in main roles. It was also remade in 2006 in Hindi as 36 China Town, directed by Abbas–Mustan with an ensemble cast of Akshaye Khanna, Shahid Kapoor, Kareena Kapoor, Vivek Shauq, Upen Patel (in his debut), Paresh Rawal, Payal Rohatgi, Johnny Lever and Tannaz Irani; while Isha Koppikar, Priyanka Chopra and Tanushree Dutta make special appearances.

== Plot ==
Five people traveling together on a train to Monte Carlo find themselves involved in the murder of an elderly Dutch millionaire who frequently visited the French Rivera.

The bride and groom Remo and Marina, hairdressers, are attracted by the lure of fortune in gambling, with which they intend to start their own business, the Commander Alberto Franzetti, after a failed attempt to "detoxify" from the demon of gambling, is back in Monaco, where his wife is waiting for him, the pair of borgatari Quirino and Giovanna is committed to bring a dog to millionaire Dutch for the lucrative reward. The six main characters, for different reasons, are involved in the investigation and, all of them distrusting of the police, try to extricate themselves from the quandary by lying and raising more and more suspicions on themselves. Thanks to the research of the Commissioner of Police they will be acquitted in the end, while the real culprits will be exposed.

== Cast ==
- Alberto Sordi: Alberto Franzetti
- Vittorio Gassman: Remo
- Nino Manfredi: Quirino
- Silvana Mangano: Marina
- Dorian Gray: Eleonora Franzetti
- Franca Valeri: Giovanna
- Georges Rivière: Eleonora's Lover
- Bernard Blier: Police Commissioner
- Sylva Koscina: Carolina
- Tino Scotti: Fiorenzo
