= Le salamandre =

- Directed by: Alberto Cavallone
- Screenplay by: Alberto Cavallone
- Story by: Alberto Cavallone
- Starring: Erna Schurer; Beryl Cunningham; Antonio Casale
- Cinematography: Maurizio Centini
- Edited by: Mario Salvatore
- Music by: Franco Potenza
- Production company: Produzioni Vega-Star
- Distributed by: Paris Etoile Film
- Release date: 26 February 1969 (Italy)
- Country: Italy

Le salamandre (transl. The Salamanders) is a 1969 Italian film directed by Alberto Cavallone. It gained a great commercial success and launched the brief careers of the two main actresses, Erna Schürer and Beryl Cunningham.

== Cast ==
- Erna Schürer as Ursula
- Beryl Cunningham as Uta
- Antonio Casale as Dr. Henry Duval (Credited as Anthony Vernon)

== Production ==
Cavallone originally developed the script for La salamandre with Sergio Lentati which originally contained more political material. director Alberto Cavallone, relocated to Rome where he worked on television commercials and writing scripts for directors like Duccio Tessari and Nino Zanchin. The film that was shot focused more on erotic content. The film developed was a cheaper production of 28 million Italian lire from first time producer Carlo Maietto.

The film was shot in Northern Africa with interior scenes shot in De Paolis Studios.

== Release ==
Originally titled C'era una bionda (transl. There was a blonde) after the distributor Cidif backed out and was picked up for distribution by Paris Etoile Film. It was distributed theatrically on 26 February 1969 in Italy. The film did well in the Italian box office grossing 500 million Italian lire.

== See also ==
- List of Italian films of 1969
