= Jacqueline Scott-Lemoine =

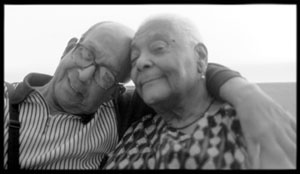
- Jacqueline Scott-Lemoine with her husband, Lucien Lemoine
- Born: October 28, 1923; Port-au-Prince, Haiti
- Died: July 9, 2011 (aged 87); Dakar, Senegal
- Occupations: Actress, writer
- Spouse: Lucien Lemoine

Jacqueline Scott-Lemoine (October 28, 1923 – July 9, 2011) was a Haitian-Senegalese actress and writer. Her inter-continental career serves as an example of the 20th-century back-to-Africa movement.

== Early life and education ==
Jacqueline Scott was born in 1923 in Port-au-Prince, Haiti. She was descended from enslaved people brought from Africa, like most Haitians.

In the late 1940s and early '50s, she discovered an interest in theater in Haiti, a milieu that was enriched at the time by visits from the Jean-Louis Barrault Company, Aimé Césaire, Jean-Paul Sartre, and Louis Jouvet. She studied at the center of dramatic arts at the Haitian Institut Français, as well as at the dramatic arts conservatory in Port-au-Prince.

== Career ==
Finding life under the François Duvalier regime unbearable, she moved in 1962 to France, where she worked at the Office de Radiodiffusion Télévision Française. As a comedic performer, she appeared in a stage adaptation of Gouverneurs de la rosée by the Haitian author Jacques Roumain. The director Jean-Marie Serreau noticed her when he came to see the show, and he chose her to create the role of Madame Christophe in the Aimé Césaire play La Tragédie du roi Christophe in 1964. It was while working on this show that she met her future husband, fellow actor and Haitian expatriate Lucien Lemoine, whom she married later that year. The show toured Europe, and in April 1966 the troupe performed it in Senegal as part of the first World Festival of Black Arts. After that, Scott-Lemoine and her husband decided to settle in Senegal. She would become a citizen a decade later, in 1976.

She continued her acting career in Senegal, notably appearing in La fête à Harlem, written and directed by the American Melvin Van Peebles, and Jean Genet's Les Nègres, directed by Roger Blain. For 18 years, she performed in these and various other pieces in the repertoire of Dakar's Daniel Sorano National Theater, under the direction of Raymond Hermantier, Maurice Sonar Senghor, Jean-Pierre Leurs, and others. She also worked in film, notably appearing in Piero Vivarelli's The Black Decameron (1972) and the Moroccan director Souheil Ben-Barka's Amok (1982).

Scott-Lemoine participated in Senegal's cultural sphere in various other ways. In 1989, she created a dance and poetry performance piece, Afrique corps mémorable, with the French-Senegalese choreographer Germaine Acogny. She also served as editor of the magazine Entracte and wrote for several other publications in Senegal and abroad. For 12 years, she and her husband produced the radio show La voix des poètes on Radiodiffusion Télévision Sénégalaise. She managed programming at the Daniel Sorano National Theater and, in the 1990s, launched a workshop for theater studies with her husband at Dakar's Cheikh Anta Diop University. The couple also taught at the Centre d'études des sciences et techniques de l'information (CESTI), a journalism school.

In 2005, she published Les Nuits de Tulussia, a collection of short stories and novellas, with the publisher Présence Africaine. Later, in 2007, she published the play La ligne de crête.

== Later years ==
Scott-Lemoine's final performance came at the 40th anniversary celebration of the Daniel Sorano National Theater, where she played the queen mother in Cheik Aliou Ndao's L'Exil d'Albouri.

She died in 2011 at age 87, in Dakar, a year after the death of her husband.

== Selected works ==
- Les Nuits de Tulussia, Présence africaine, Paris, 2005.
- La ligne de crête, Nègre International, Dakar, 2007.
