= Erna Schürer =

Italian actress, model and television hostess

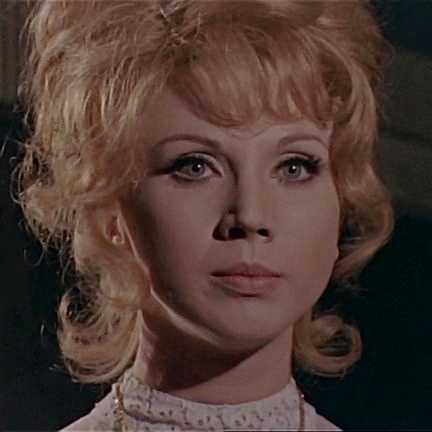
- Erna Schürer in Scream of the Demon Lover (1970)
- Born: 18 August 1942 (age 83)
- Occupations: Actress, model and television hostess

Erna Schürer (born 18 August 1942) is an Italian actress, model and television hostess, sometimes credited as Erna Scheurer or Erna Schuler.

== Life and career ==
Born in Naples as Emma Costantino, Schürer moved to Milan where she began a career as glamour model, posing among others for Vogue and Harper's Bazaar, and debuted on stage in the Giorgio Strehler's Piccolo Teatro.

After some secondary roles, she had her first main role in Alberto Cavallone's Le salamandre, and, thanks to the success of the film, she obtained a contract with Alberto Grimaldi, for whom she starred in numerous genre films between 1969 and 1977. In the same years, she was also very active on theatre, working with Ugo Gregoretti, Garinei & Giovannini, Mario Missiroli.

Later, she appeared in some TV-series and shows, such as Domenica insieme and Sereno variabile.

== Selected filmography ==
- Lipstick (1960)
- Lola Colt (1967)
- Le salamandre (1969)
- La bambola di Satana (1969)
- Erotissimo (1969)
- Battle of the Last Panzer (1969)
- Le Mans, Shortcut to Hell (1970)
- Scream of the Demon Lover (1970)
- Your Hands on My Body (1970)
- Un gioco per Eveline (1971)
- Valerie Inside Outside (1972)
- My Pleasure Is Your Pleasure (1973)
- Nude per l'assassino (1975)
- Snapshot of a Crime (1975)
- Deported Women of the SS Special Section (1976)
- The Virgo, the Taurus and the Capricorn (1977)
- Specters (1987)
