= Afrika (film) =

- Directed by: Alberto Cavallone
- Written by: Alberto Cavallone
- Produced by: Aldo Addobbati
- Starring: Ivano Staccioli; Maria Pia Luzi; Andrea Traglia
- Cinematography: Maurizio Centini
- Edited by: Anita Cacciolati
- Music by: Franco Potenza
- Production company: Castle Film
- Distributed by: Variety/Pab.
- Release date: 15 December 1973
- Running time: 94 minutes
- Countries: Italy; Ethiopia
- Language: Italian

Afrika is a 1973 Italian film directed by Alberto Cavallone. At the center of the story is a homosexual relationship set in Africa.

== Plot ==
Philippe, a bisexual painter, is living through a crisis. He is torn between his love for his wife and his attraction for young men. In Ethiopia, he meets Frank, a young homosexual, falls in love with him and takes him in as his secretary, making him part of the family like he has done with other young men.

In the end, he abandons Frank just as he has undergone a sex change. The young man's disappointment causes him to commit suicide by a bullet to his temple, with the aid of his sister, who - pressured by her macho husband - was not able to live with her brother's homosexuality.

== Cast ==
- Ivano Staccioli as Professor Philippe Stone
- Andrea Traglia as Frank
- Jane Avril as Philip's wife
- Kara Donati as Jeanne
- Debete Eshepete
- Zawdit Asta
- Peter Belphet
- Gianni Basso

== Production ==
According to Marco Giusti, the story is inspired by a novel which appeared as part of the "edizioni 513".

In a statement director Alberto Cavallone gave to the Italian journal "Nocturno", he said that he was interested in exploring this type of relationship that was considered taboo at the time. Above all, he wanted to do an African story in which Africa would only be a backdrop in order to make the protagonists closer to each other. In a decolonialised Africa, Cavallone said, the whites were like the soldiers of General Custer.

The shooting in Ethiopia was riddled with problems. At one point, the director and the cameraman were put into a security prison cell.

== Reception ==
Director Cavallone himself was not very content about the choice of Ivano Staccioli as protagonist, but neither was he content with the film itself. He stated that it was not a film that could please the public, and that that was indeed what happened.

== Bibliography ==
- Giusti, Marco (1999). dizionario dei film italiani STRACULT [sic]. Cles: Sterling & Kupfer. ISBN 88-200-2919-7.
