= Phenomenal and the Treasure of Tutankhamen =

- Directed by: Ruggero Deodato
- Screenplay by: Ruggero Deodato; Aldo Iginio Capone
- Story by: Aldo Iginio Capone
- Produced by: Nicola Mauro Parenti
- Cinematography: Roberto Reale
- Edited by: Luciano Cavalieri
- Music by: Bruno Nicolai
- Production company: I.C.A.R.
- Distributed by: Variety Distribution
- Release date: 1968 (Italy)
- Running time: 95 minutes
- Country: Italy

Phenomenal and the Treasure of Tutankhamen (Italian: Fenomenal e il tesoro di Tutankamen) is a 1968 Italian film directed by Ruggero Deodato. The film was produced by and starred Nicola Mauro Parenti as Fenomenal, a masked superhero who attempts to stop the theft of the mask of Tutankhamun from a museum in Paris.

== Cast ==
- Nicola Mauro Parenti as Count Guy Norton / Fenomenal
- Lucretia Love as Lucretia Perkins
- Gordon Mitchell as Gregory Falkov
- John Karlsen as Prof. Mickewitz
- Carla Romanelli as Anna Guillaume

== Production ==
Phenomenal and the Treasure of Tutankhamen was directed by Ruggero Deodato under the name of Roger Rockfeller. Deodato later stated on his name choice that he thought ""a rich man's name...so who is a rich guy? Rockfeller!" See, I was as dumb as a rock." Deodato has a cameo in the film as the man who falls off a bicycle. The producer of the film was Nicola Mauro Parenti who also starred in the film as the main character Count Guy Norton and Fenomenal. On his acting, Deodato mentioned that he was "too stiff, a dog of an actor; I treated him like shit on the set, but then he called me again for Zenabel." Deodato mentioned that the producer often dealt with people who requested small roles in the film in exchange for funding.

Among the cast is Parenti's wife Lucretia Love. The film was shot in Rome, Paris and Tunisia. While shooting in Paris on the Champs Elysées, while panning across the crowd gathering to see President Charles de Gaulle, among the crowd was Rex Harrison.

== Release ==
Phenomenal and the Treasure of Tutankhamen was released in Italy in 1968.

== Reception ==
James Lowder reviewed Phenomenal and the Treasure of Tutankhamen in White Wolf Inphobia #57 (July, 1995), rating it a 1 1/2 out of 5 and stated that "Most of the movie's positive aspects are more than counterbalanced by such flaws as an incredibly annoying soundtrack (complete with scat-Muzak theme music for the hero). Phenomenal also boasts one of the most uninspired underwater fight scenes ever filmed. There are worse masked hero flicks, but that's hardly a reason to force yourself to sit through this one."

Deodato spoke negatively about the film in later interviews, mentioning in 2008 that he "didn't give a shit about the film."

From retrospective reviews, Roberto Curti described it as "one of the lamest, less remarkable entries in the supercriminal/superherotrend of the late 60s" with a storyline "so confused it is difficult to tell what is going on at times." Curti noted that the best thing about the film was the score by Bruno Nicolai.

== See also ==
- List of Italian films of 1968
