= The Specialists (film) =

1969 film directed by Sergio Corbucci

- French film poster
- Directed by: Sergio Corbucci
- Screenplay by: Sergio Corbucci; Sabatino Ciuffini
- Story by: Sergio Corbucci; Sabatino Ciuffini; Uncredited: Lee Van Cleef
- Starring: Johnny Hallyday; Gastone Moschin; Françoise Fabian; Sylvie Fennec; Serge Marquand; Angela Luce; Mario Adorf
- Cinematography: Dario Di Palma
- Edited by: Elsa Armanni
- Music by: Angelo Francesco Lavagnino
- Color process: Technicolor
- Production companies: Adelphia Compagnia Cinematografica; Les Films Marceau; Neue Emelka
- Distributed by: Magna (Italy); Cocinor (France); Constantin Film (West Germany)
- Release dates: 26 November 1969 (Italy); 10 April 1970 (Germany); 22 April 1970 (France)
- Running time: 104 minutes
- Countries: Italy; France; West Germany
- Languages: French; Italian
- Box office: £309.9 million (Italy); 1,252,173 admissions (France)

The Specialists (Italian: Gli specialisti, also known as Drop Them or I'll Shoot) is a 1969 Spaghetti Western co-written and directed by Sergio Corbucci. It was an international co-production between Italy, France and West Germany. Retrospective critics and scholars of Corbucci's Westerns have deemed The Specialists to be the final film in the director's "Mud and Blood" trilogy, which also includes Django (1966) and The Great Silence (1968).

== Plot ==
Outside of the town of Blackstone, a group of bandits rob a coach and humiliate its passengers. A man named Hud appears and he single-handedly kills enough criminals to scare the rest of the gang away. This feat is spotted by a group of rebellious teenagers, who, impressed, ask him to join them in their plans to take over the town. Hud, however, refuses. He is returning to Blackstone, the town where he grew up in, after learning that his brother Charly has been lynched for robbing a bank. For this, Hud seeks revenge on the whole town.

In Blackstone, no guns are allowed, and Hud is forced to reluctantly surrender his own. However, many citizens are surreptitiously armed and try to kill him, having deduced his intentions. None of them can kill Hud, who manages to murder each of his assailants in self-defense.

Hud stays with his old friend Sheba, who is in love with him. Virginia Pollicut, the owner of Blackstone's bank and an old acquaintance of Hud, tries to seduce him, to no avail. Meanwhile, the sheriff, who is distrustful of Hud, starts following him. After a confrontation between the two, they are captured by bandits working for "El Diablo", a local Mexican criminal and an old partner of Hud and Charly. El Diablo orders Hud to bring him the money Charly stole and hid. If Hud disobeys, El Diablo will kill the sheriff.

Using Charly's old things as clues, Hud realizes that the money is buried in the local cemetery. While unearthing the money, he is spotted by the sheriff, who had escaped earlier from the bandits. The sheriff arrests Hud and returns the stolen money to Blackstone's bank. Aided by her lover Cabot, Virginia murders an officer protecting the money and flees with the loot that very night. Outside of Blackstone, Virginia murders Cabot and begins burning the bills, which turn out to be fake, as they are proof of her own attempts of stealing Blackstone's money. Before she can burn all of the evidence, she is spotted by El Diablo and his gang, who bring Virginia to Blackstone against her will and reveal her crimes to the whole town. Wanting her to reveal the location of the real money, they continue her humiliation by taking Virginia to a barn and raping her. All of this is eventually stopped by Hud, who murders the criminals. Mortally wounded in the gunfight, Virginia reveals where she hid the money, which Hud recovers and burns in front of the whole town before collapsing from his own wounds.

Taking advantage of the ensuing chaos, the rebellious teens seize guns and take over Blackstone, forcing everyone present to disrobe and lie on the ground. Meanwhile, Sheba and some prostitutes secretly take care of Hud inside a saloon. Realizing that he needs a doctor, Sheba leaves to get one but is captured by the teens, who threaten to hurt her if Hud does not face them. Despite being heavily wounded and having no bullets, Hud comes out of the saloon, and the teens shoot at him. Thanks to his bulletproof vest and the teens' poor marksmanship, Hud survives the attack and raises his gun, making everybody think that he has bullets. Horrified and out of bullets themselves, the teens flee. Having saved the humiliated townsfolk, Hud gets on a horse and leaves both Blackstone and Sheba.

== Cast ==
- Johnny Hallyday as Hud Dixon
- Gastone Moschin as Sheriff Gideon Ring
- Françoise Fabian as Virginia Pollicut
- Sylvie Fennec as Sheba
- Mario Adorf as Francisco Rafael Pacorro ("El Diablo")
- Angela Luce as Valencia
- Serge Marquand as Boot
- Gino Pernice as Cabot
- Andrés José Cruz Soublette as Rosencrantz
- Gabriella Tavernese as Apache
- Stefano Cattarossi as Kit
- Christian Belegue as Buddy
- Renato Pinciroli as Lord
- Lucio Rosato as Deputy Sheriff
- Remo De Angelis as Romero
- Riccardo Domenici as Mac Lane
- Mario Castellani as Judge Ham
- Mimmo Poli as Barman
- Franco Castellani as Woodie
- Brizio Montinaro as Charlie Dixon
- Franco Marletta as Bill

== Production ==
Sergio Corbucci originally developed The Specialists as a starring vehicle for actor Lee Van Cleef; the original draft of the script, credited to both men, bore the title of Lo specialiste a mano armata ("The specialist with the armed hand"), but a later draft was titled Il ritorno del mercenario ("The return of the mercenary"), linking the project with Corbucci's earlier Western The Mercenary (1968). The project was initially abandoned after Corbucci and Van Cleef had a falling out, but it was retooled when French producer Edmond Tenoudji asked Corbucci to write and direct a film for singer Johnny Hallyday; the resulting film uses only a small amount of material from the Corbucci/Van Cleef drafts, such as the hero wearing a bulletproof chainmail vest.

The film credits the screenplay to Corbucci and Sabatino Ciuffini, with whom the director would later work with on Er Più – storia d'amore e di coltello (1971), Sonny & Jed (1972), What Am I Doing in the Middle of a Revolution? (1972), Di che segno sei? (1975), Odds and Evens (1978) and Super Fuzz (1980). To accommodate the primary cast members and ensure the film's marketability in France, most of the dialogue was performed in French; Hallyday also recalled that much of the film was improvised, with scenes being written as they were shot.

Principal photography on The Specialists took place entirely in Italy; most of the exteriors were shot in the Venetian Prealps and the Dolomites. Other sequences were filmed on the outskirts of Rome: the scenes taking place in El Diablo's lair were shot in Canale Monterano; Diablo's riverside ambush of Pollicut was filmed at Mazzano Romano, and the Western town set at Elios Films, which Corbucci had previously used in many of his films, stood in for Blackstone City. Morale among the cast and crew during the early stages of the shoot was positive, but tensions eventually rose between the Italian and French crew members, and Françoise Fabian argued with Corbucci against his intentions to include a rape scene for her character, prompting Corbucci's wife Nori to defend her husband's position. Because the Blackstone scenes were shot during a heatwave that had struck Rome, at one point Mario Adorf nearly suffocated under his heavy costume.

== Themes ==
Like most of Corbucci's Westerns, The Specialists features prominent left-wing, anti-authoritarian themes and messages; in the documentary Sergio Corbucci: L'uomo che ride, the director stated that it "was a film about how the wealthy are oppressors". Unusually, the film also presents an anti-hippie stance in the portrayal of several of its antagonists; in a 1971 interview with the French magazine Image et Son, Corbucci stated:

The idea was to show that I was against the hippies. Listen, at this time the Manson business hadn't happened... but there are too many real problems in the world for me to accept the disinterested passivity of these people. Yesterday, Jimi Hendrix died shooting up in London. I am against drugs and hippies. I wanted to denounce them in The Specialists... I'm really violently against their attitude, and I hate Easy Rider.

== Release ==
The Specialists premiered in Italy on November 26, 1969, where it grossed 309,936,000 Italian lira, making it the 17th highest-grossing Spaghetti Western of that year and making only marginally more money than Corbucci's earlier The Great Silence. It was released in West Germany on 10 April 1970 as Fahrt zur Hölle, ihr Halunken ("Go to Hell, you scoundrels") and in France as Le Spécialiste (highlighting Hallyday's appeal over Gastone Moschin and Adorf in the Italian version's plural title) on 22 April 1970. The film was Corbucci's most successful Western in the French market, garnering 1,252,173 cinema admissions and becoming the 30th most popular film released there in 1970. Most of the differences between the Italian and French versions of the film concern the climax: while dying, El Diablo orders his biographer Chico to falsify the outcome of his duel with Hud in the former version and tells him to write the truth in the latter, and the Italian prints feature a montage of close-ups of the townspeople's reaction to Hud burning the stolen money; these are missing from the French prints.

In the UK, the film was released in June 1973 by Golden Era Film Distributors in an English-dubbed version titled Drop Them or I'll Shoot. This version, given an X-rating by the BBFC, ran 92 minutes compared to the 104 minute runtime of uncut European prints and deleted several scenes, such as the entire pre-credits sequence.

The Specialists was screened as part of the Cinéma de la Plage program during the 2018 Cannes Film Festival. Presented by TF1 and Carlotta Films, the film had undergone a 4K restoration of the original Technicolor-Techniscope camera negative and the French and Italian-language magnetic tapes, which was carried out by the laboratories L'Image Retrouvée, Paris, and L'Immagine Ritrovata, Bologna.

=== Home media ===
The 4K restoration of The Specialists was released on DVD, Blu-ray and Ultra HD Blu-ray by TF1 on June 5, 2018, featuring both the French and Italian audio tracks (with French subtitles for the latter), with accompanying special features consisting of the French and Italian theatrical trailers, an interview about the film with Cinémathèque Française director of programming Jean-François Rauger, and a 32-page booklet containing a reprinting of the Pilote comic Le Guitariste ("The Guitarist"), a parody of the film created by Pascal Guichard and Jean–Claude Morchoisne.

In 2020, the restoration saw two further releases: the first, released on January 7, was distributed by Kino Lorber Studio Classics on DVD and Blu-ray for the US market, featuring English subtitles for the Italian track, an audio commentary by filmmaker Alex Cox, and the Italian trailer. The second, released on May 18, was handled in the UK by Eureka Entertainment for Blu-ray. Aside from the French and Italian tracks (for which English subtitles are provided for each), the disc also presents what is known to exist of the film's English dub track, which was found to have suffered irreparable damage and large segments missing (which play in subtitled French on the disc). The disc's special features include the French and Italian trailers, Cox's commentary, an interview with Radical Frontiers in the Spaghetti Western author Austin Fisher about the film and its historical context, the complete script of the English dub (presented as both a slideshow and a PDF file on the disc), and a booklet containing essays about the film and French-produced Westerns by Once Upon a Time in the Italian West author Howard Hughes.

== Reception ==
From contemporary reviews, Tony Rayns reviewed the Drop Them or I'll Shoot version of the film in the Monthly Film Bulletin. Rayns described the film as Corbucci "dourly going through the motions of the Continental revenge Western." Rayns commented that Corbucci's film did have "a splendid finale-after the excellently shot and edited massacre of El Diablo's gang" while concluding that otherwise, all "the film offers are the stereotyped bickering cowards, the stoic Sheriff, the secretly scheming villainess and the cheroot-chewing avenger: all precisedly stage-managed by Corbucci, but without much enthusiasm and to little point."

== See also ==
- List of Italian films of 1969
