= The Black Decameron =

- Directed by: Piero Vivarelli
- Written by: Ottavio Alesi; Piero Vivarelli
- Based on: Der schwarze Dekameron by Leo Frobenius
- Produced by: Alfredo Bini
- Starring: Beryl Cunningham (La regina bella); Djibril Diop Mambéty (Che cosa non ha fatto)
- Cinematography: Roberto Gerardi
- Music by: Luciano Michelini
- Release date: 15 October 1972
- Running time: 98 min
- Country: Italy
- Language: Italian

The Black Decameron (Italian: Il decamerone nero) is a 1972 Italian costume drama comedy film directed by Piero Vivarelli.

== Background ==
An adaptation of five stories from the anthology Der schwarze Dekameron: Belege und Aktenstücke über Liebe, Witz und Heldentum in Innerafrika (1910) by ethnologist Leo Frobenius with a short final vignette, The Black Decameron is essentially a cross between Decamerotici films of the early commedia sexy all'italiana genre and Mondo films in featuring gratuitous pseudo-ethnographic nudity.

The Black Decameron was shot in the Province of Matera and in Senegal and it features, besides Beryl Cunningham who was the director's partner at the time, a multinational cast including Senegalese actors such as Djibril Diop Mambéty and Senegal-based Haitian actor couple Jacqueline Scott and Lucien Lemoine.

== Synopsis ==
Each story starts with a griot introduction in the Wolof language by korafola Bana Cissokho.

La regina bella (The Beautiful Queen): A queen is single and decides to marry and she puts her suitors on harsh trials of strength and courage. Knowing that all former candidates had perished this way, N'sani plans to win the queen's hand by cunning and trickery.

Guarigione di una pazza per gli uomini (Healing of a Woman Crazy for Men): A man is married to a nymphomaniac and asks for his friend's help to solve this problem.

Gli amanti puniti (The Punished Lovers): A fisherman suspects that his wife Adu is cheating on him and pretends to be blind to learn the truth.

Vendetta di prostituta (Vengeance of the Prostitute): Elders in a village punish men who sleep with prostitute Mande and she sets a trap for the elders in order to expose their hypocrisy.

Che cosa non ha fatto (What He Did Not Do): Handsome and "well-endowed" Simoa gets drunk on too much toddy and wears women's clothes. He soon contemplates that his drag may also bring some advantages and arrives at the house of a village judge to be his "new wife" but ends up sleeping with all the women of the household.

== Cast ==
- Beryl Cunningham: the queen
- Serigne Ndiaye 'Gonzales': N'sani
- Jacqueline Scott: the dignitary of the queen
- Josy McGregory: Adu
- Line Senghor: Mande
- Djibril Diop Mambéty: Simoa
- Lucien Lemoine: the judge
- Isseu Niang (credited as Issa Niang): the judge's wife
- Isabelle Diallo: Antha, a daughter of the judge
- Bintha Gassama: the girl in the final vignette
