= La bambola di Satana =

- Italian film poster
- Directed by: Ferruccio Casapinta
- Screenplay by: Giorgio Cristallini; Carlo M. Lori; Ferruccio Casapinta
- Story by: Ferruccio Casapinta
- Starring: Erna Schürer; Roland Carey; Aurora Batista; Ettore Ribotta; Lucia Bomez
- Cinematography: Francesco Attenni
- Edited by: Franco Attenni
- Music by: Franco Potenza
- Production company: Cinediorama
- Distributed by: Paris Etoile
- Release date: 12 June 1969 (Italy)
- Running time: 90 minutes
- Country: Italy
- Box office: ₤118 million

La bambola di Satana ("The Doll of Satan") is a 1969 Italian gothic horror giallo film written and directed by Ferruccio Casapinta.

== Plot ==
Elizabeth, a beautiful young woman, inherits her late uncle's mansion after his death. Upon arriving at the castle, she meets Mrs. Carroll, the administrator, who reveals that the place is haunted by ghosts. Mrs. Carroll convinces Elizabeth to sell the mansion to Mr. Paul Reynaud. As eerie events unfold, Elizabeth becomes convinced that selling is the right choice. Things take a dark turn when the castle's waiter is murdered. Despite Elizabeth's belief, her fiancé Jack suspects foul play by Carroll. With the help of a private investigator posing as a painter, they uncover the truth: Carroll and Mr. Reynaud were lovers, plotting to pressure Elizabeth into selling the castle cheaply. Carroll had learned about a valuable uranium mine in the mansion's underground from the old uncle's confessions.

== Cast ==
- Erna Schürer as Elizabeth Ball Janon
- Roland Carey as Jack Seaton
- Aurora Battista as Claudine (credited as Aurora Batista)
- Ettore Ribotta as Paul Reno
- Manlio Salvatori as Edward
- Franco Daddi as Mr. Cordova
- Lucie Bomez as Carol
- Beverly Fuller as Blanche
- Eugenio Galadini as Andrea
- Giorgio Gennari as Gerard
- Domenico Ravenna as Mr. Shinton
- Teresa Ronchi as Jeanette
- Giovanni Ivan Scratuglia

== Production ==
La bambola di Satana is Ferruccio Casapinta's only film credit as a director. Lead actress Emma Costantino described the production as a "troubled shoot", stating that Ferruccio Casapinta's assistant director was the person who "did everything on set" and that Casapinta "was an idiot who couldn't do anything."

La bambola di Satana was filmed at Castle Borghese in Pomezia, Pratica di Mare and in Abruzzo.

== Release ==
La bambola di Satana was released in Italy on 12 June 1969, where it was distributed by Cinediorama. It grossed a total of 118,009,000 Italian lire on its theatrical release. The film was never dubbed into English and did not receive a theatrical release in the United States.

In 2016, Twilight Time in a Limited Edition of 3,000 units released the film for the first time on Blu-ray. 88 Films released a Limited Edition Blu-ray in 2021.

== Critical reception ==
Roberto Curti, author of Italian Gothic Horror Films, 1957–1969 stated that Ferruccio Casapinta "shows no directorial flair at all." and that for a gothic film, it "looks awful." The review noted that editing was poor, with night and day shots alternating within the same scene and that the special effects were terrible noting the thunderstorms and pink clouds that surround the castle. Curti concluded that the film was an "obscure— and deservedly so— addition to the Gothic genre" Louis Paul, author of Italian Horror Film Directors stated that the film is "certainly rooted within the classic gothic atmosphere of early Italian horrors, but the addition of considerable nudity and a black-gloved killer clearly places La bambola at the cusp of the new age. It is an indication of the changing aspects of the Italian horror film to come." AllMovie gave the film a three and a half star out of five rating, finding that the film "benefits from a slicker look and a better sense of humor." and that "It all seems a bit overwrought, but fans of Italian horror don't come to it for subtlety. Indeed, the nearly operatic histrionics on display are immensely enjoyable, for their camp value if nothing else."

== See also ==
- List of horror films of 1969
- List of Italian films of 1969

== Footnotes ==
=== References ===
- Curti, Roberto (2015). Italian Gothic Horror Films, 1957–1969. McFarland. ISBN 978-1-4766-1989-7.
- Luther-Smith, Adrian (1999). Blood and Black Lace: The Definitive Guide to Italian Sex and Horror Movies. Stray Cat Publishing Ltd. ISBN 0-9533261-1-X.
- Paul, Louis (2005). Italian Horror Film Directors. McFarland. ISBN 978-0-7864-8749-3.
