= Scream of the Demon Lover =

- Italian theatrical release poster
- Directed by: José Luis Merino
- Written by: Enrico Colombo; Maria del Carmen Martinez Roman; Jose Luis Merino
- Produced by: Hispamer; Prodimex; Orbita Films
- Starring: Erna Schurer; Carlos Quiney; Agostina Belli
- Production companies: Hispamer Films; Prodimex Film; Órbita Films
- Distributed by: Variety Distribution; Roger Corman
- Release date: 8 October 1970 (Italy)
- Running time: 98 mins 78 mins (U.S.)
- Countries: Italy; Spain
- Language: English

Scream of the Demon Lover (released in Italy as Il castello dalle porte di fuoco/ The Castle With the Door of Fire) is a horror film, originally written under the title Ivanna. It was released in France as Le Monstre du château, and in Mexico as El Castillo di Frankenstein. It was written by Enrico Colombo and Maria del Carmen Martinez Roman, with input from the director Jose Luis Merino. Roger Corman bought the film for his New World Pictures to put on a drive-in double bill with The Velvet Vampire. The film was cut in the U.S. from 98 minutes to only 78 minutes, eliminating some of the nudity and gore.

== Plot ==
A beautiful young woman named Ivanna travels to a remote estate to seek employment as a biochemist for Baron Janos Dalmar. She finds herself attracted to him, so she immerses herself in her work to suppress her lusty desires. A rash of rather brutal murders occurs in the area, and she soon discovers that the Baron has a disfigured brother Igor.

== Cast ==
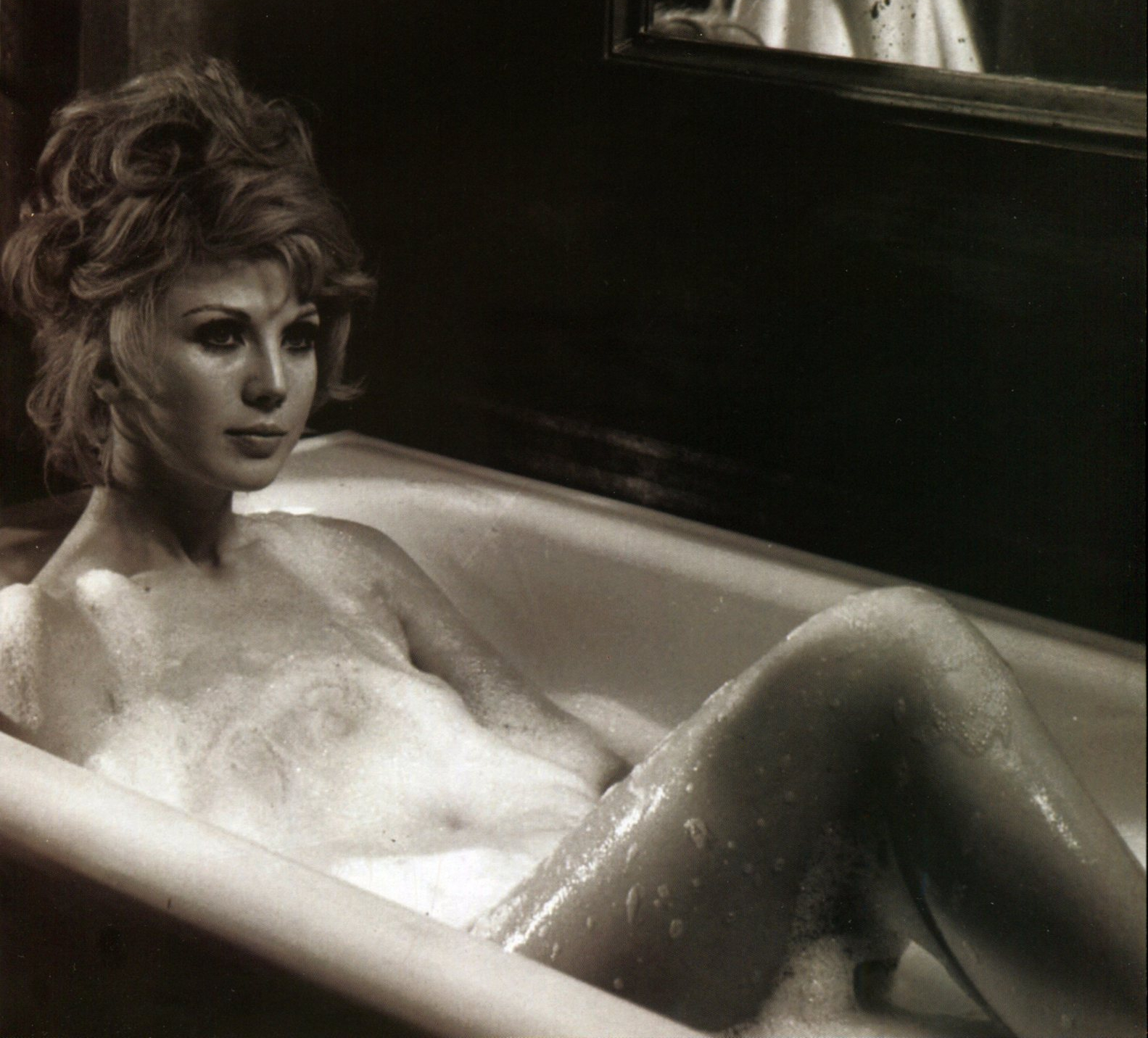
Erna Schurer as Ivanna Rakowski

- Erna Schurer as Ivanna Rakowski
- Carlos Quiney as Janos Dalmar
- Agostina Belli as Christiana the maid
- Christiana Galloni as Olga
- Antonio Jimenez Escribano as the butler
- Enzo Fisichella as Igor
- Ezio Sancrotti as Driver/ Rapist
- Mariano Vidal Molina as the Inspector
- Franco Moraldi as the Mayor
- Giancarlo Fantini as the Doctor
- Renato Paracchi as the police writer
- Javier de Rivera as the Judge
- Silvia Faver as the Voice of Ivanna (in U.S. dubbed prints)
