= Blow Job (1980 film) =

Blow Job (Soffio erotico)
- Directed by: Alberto Cavallone
- Screenplay by: Alberto Cavallone
- Story by: Alberto Cavallone
- Produced by: Pietro Belpedio
- Starring: Danilo Micheli; Anna Massarelli; Anna Bruna Cazzato; Mirella Venturini
- Cinematography: Maurizio Centini
- Edited by: Alberto Cavallone
- Music by: Ubaldo Continiello
- Production company: Distribuzione Cinematografica 513
- Distributed by: Cinematografica 513
- Release date: 17 May 1980 (Italy)
- Running time: 80 minutes
- Country: Italy
- Box office: 425,371,000

Blow Job (Italian: Soffio erotico) is a 1980 Italian film directed by Alberto Cavallone.

== Production ==
Director Alberto Cavallone was known for his films that combined eroticism, and experimental film styles. By the late 1970s, Cavallone had transitioned between erotic films and hardcore pornography. Cavallone described the film as a "deliberately pornographic film, but with political content. A movie about violence as a means of communication and knowledge in a repressive society." Blow Job (Soffio erotico) was officially announced as a production by Martial Boschero's company Anna Cinematografica but was actually produced by Pietro Belpedio's company Distribuzione Cinematografica 513.

The film was shot in August 1979 with the working title La strega nuda (transl. The Naked Witch). Cavallone stated that the film did not feature any graphic sex, except for a simulated instance oral sex. However, other people involved in its making refuted the claim. A hardcore version of the film was shot with the same cast, also featuring three uncredited performers who would work with Cavallone again in his hardcore films, Pauline Teutscher, Guya Lauri Filzi, and Hassan Jabar.

== Release ==
The film was first rejected by the rating board on February 23, 1980 after Cavallone refused to put any cuts in the film that have been requested.' In May 1980, Cavallone obliged to cut the film and it was given a V.M. 18 rating, on the condition that the film was given the subtitle Soffio Erotico which the board assumed was the contextual and faithful translation of "Blow Job" into Italian. Blow Job (Soffio Erotico) was distributed theatrically in Italy by Distribuzione Cinematografica 513 on May 17, 1980. The film grossed a total of 426,371,000 Italian lire domestically in Italy.
