= Brunello Rondi =

Italian film director and screenwriter

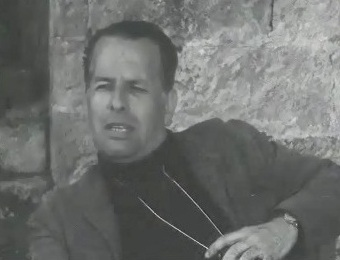
- Rondi in 1963
- Born: 26 November 1924; Italy
- Died: 7 November 1989 (aged 64); Rome, Italy
- Occupations: Screenwriter, Film director
- Years active: 1947–1982
- Notable work: La Dolce Vita, 8½, Juliet of the Spirits, Orchestra Rehearsal, City of Women
- Relatives: Gian Luigi Rondi (brother)

Brunello Rondi (26 November 1924 – 7 November 1989) was an Italian screenwriter and film director, best known for his frequent script collaborations with Federico Fellini.

His brother, Gian Luigi Rondi, was an Italian film critic.

== Biography ==
Noted chiefly as a script-writer and script consultant, Rondi began his film career with the script for 1947's Last Love for which he was also assistant director.

He worked as assistant director as well as an uncredited writer on The Flowers of St. Francis (1950) by Roberto Rossellini and was a credited writer on Rossellini's Europa '51 (1952).

He started to work with Federico Fellini as artistic director on La Strada (1954) and Nights of Cabiria (1957). His most prized collaborations were on the film scripts of La Dolce Vita (1960), 8½ (1963), Juliet of the Spirits (1964), Orchestra Rehearsal (1978), and City of Women (1980), all co-written and directed by Fellini.

On the writing of La Dolce Vita, Rondi helped build up the character of Steiner, the intellectual who kills his wife and children. As a Fellini intimate, Rondi also played a crucial role in the early stages of 8½. In a letter dated October 1960, Fellini outlined his initial ideas to Rondi that were later developed into the screenplay with co-writers Ennio Flaiano and Tullio Pinelli.

In 1961 he made his directorial debut with Violent Life, based on the novel by Pier Paolo Pasolini.

The Demon (1963) was his first film as solo director, which was highly controversial at the time and later re-evaluated by critics.

He died of a heart attack in Rome in 1989. He was 64 years old.

== Filmography ==
=== Director and scriptwriter ===
- Violent Life, co-directed with Paolo Heusch (1961)
- The Demon (1963)
- Domani non siamo più qui (1967)
- Run, Psycho, Run (1968)
- Your Hands on My Body (1970)
- Valerie Inside Outside (1972)
- Master of Love (1972)
- Ingrid sulla strada (1973)
- Tecnica di un amore (1973)
- Prigione di donne (1974)
- Smooth Velvet, Raw Silk (1976)
- I prosseneti (1976)
- La vocazione di Suor Teresa (1982)

=== Screenplays ===
- Last Love, directed by Luigi Chiarini (1947)
- The Flowers of St. Francis - uncredited, directed by Roberto Rossellini (1950)
- Altri tempi, directed by Alessandro Blasetti (1952)
- Europa '51, directed by Roberto Rossellini (1952)
- Era notte a Roma, directed by Roberto Rossellini (1960)
- La Dolce Vita, directed by Federico Fellini (1960)
- Boccaccio 70, episode The Temptation of Doctor Antonio, directed by Federico Fellini (1962)
- 8½, directed by Federico Fellini (1963)
- Juliet of the Spirits, directed by Federico Fellini (1965)
- Amanti, directed by Vittorio De Sica (1968)
- Scacco alla regina, directed by Pasquale Festa Campanile (1969)
- Fellini Satyricon, directed by Federico Fellini (1969)
- Le sorelle, directed by Roberto Malenotti (1969)
- Orchestra Rehearsal, directed by Federico Fellini (1978)
- City of Women, directed by Federico Fellini (1980)

=== Director ===
- Tecnica di un amore (1973)

=== Assistant director ===
- Last Love, directed by Luigi Chiarini (1947)
- Francesco, giullare di Dio - directed by Roberto Rossellini (1950)
- L'ultimo amante, directed by Mario Mattoli (1955)

=== Actor ===
- Le ore dell'amore, directed by Luciano Salce (1963)
- Colpo di stato, directed by Luciano Salce (1969)

== Bibliography ==
- Alberto Pezzotta, Stefania Parigi, Il lungo respiro di Brunello Rondi, Sabinae editions, 2010
