= Beryl Cunningham =

Jamaican actress and model (1946–2020)

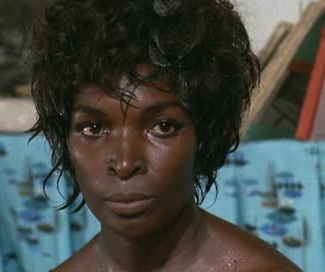
- Cunningham in Il dio serpente (1975)
- Born: 8 August 1946; Montego Bay, Jamaica
- Died: 11 December 2020 (aged 74); Borbona, Rieti, Italy
- Occupations: Actress; model; singer

Beryl Cunningham (8 August 1946 – 11 December 2020) was a Jamaican actress and model, mainly active in Italian cinema.

== Life and career ==
Born in Montego Bay, Jamaica, the daughter of a university professor, after the high school graduation Cunningham moved to London to attend the university and to pursue a modeling career.

Cunningham's career, after some secondary roles, was launched in the late 60's by the erotic drama Le salamandre, directed by Alberto Cavallone, that she accepted to shoot for free. Shortly after she obtained three more commercial successes, The Weekend Murders, directed by Michele Lupo, and Il dio serpente and The Black Decameron, both directed by Piero Vivarelli, her partner at the time. Later starred in several genre films and in Ettore Scola's Brutti, sporchi e cattivi, but failed to capitalize on her early success and retired from acting in the early 1980s.

During her career Cunningham was also a presenter, hosting among others the 1971 edition of Cantagiro, and a singer, recording among others a cover of the Jula de Palma's hit "Tua". In 1979 she was a regular guest of the television program Playboy di mezzanotte.

In 1981, she also published a book of Jamaican aphrodisiac recipes, La cucina giamaicana, published by Crochet Edizioni.
