= Evaristo Márquez =

Colombian actor and herdsman

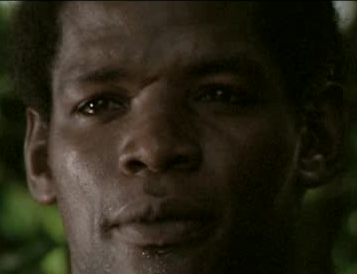
- Evaristo Márquez in Il dio serpente (1970)
- Born: August 23, 1939; San Basilio de Palenque, Colombia
- Died: June 15, 2013 (aged 73); Cartagena, Colombia
- Occupation: Actor
- Known for: Role as José Dolores in Burn!

Evaristo Márquez (August 23, 1939 – June 15, 2013) was a Colombian actor and herdsman best known for his role as José Dolores in the film Burn!, acting alongside Marlon Brando under the direction of Gillo Pontecorvo.

== Biography ==
Before his involvement with Pontecorvo he was a herdsman and illiterate. Márquez appeared in three more movies during the 1970s. With the decline of his film career, Márquez returned to work as a herdsman
Of his experience with Brando, Márquez said "he never made me feel inferior to him, he regarded me as a brother", and "indeed, there was no one like Brando; that way of changing the expression of his face, of his eyes; even more, he was a brave man."
In 2008 Márquez appeared in Chimbumbe, short film shown at the Cartagena Film Festival.
In August 2010 Márquez appeared in El Tambor Magico, a short film made by San Basilio de Palenque children.

He lived in San Basilio de Palenque, Colombia. Marquez died at a hospital in Cartagena, Colombia on June 15, 2013. He was 73.

== Filmography ==
=== Film ===
- El Tambor Magico (2010)
- Chimbumbe (2008)
- Mulato (1974)
- Cumbia (1973)
- Arde (1971)
- Il dio serpente (1970)
- Burn! (1969) as José Dolores
