= The Hanging Woman =

1973 Spanish horror film

Orgy of the Dead
- DVD cover
- Directed by: José Luis Merino
- Written by: José Luis Merino; Enrico Colombo (as Enrico Calento); Paul Naschy (the later added "Igor" scenes)
- Produced by: Ramona Plana
- Starring: Stelvio Rosi; Dyanik Zurakowska; Paul Naschy; Gerard Tichy; Aurora de Alba
- Cinematography: Modesto Rizzolo
- Edited by: Sandro Lena
- Music by: Francesco De Masi
- Production companies: Petruka Films; Prodimex
- Distributed by: Variety Distribution; Alemania-Filmverleih GmbH; Border Films
- Release dates: September 3, 1973 (Spain); 1974 (U.S.)
- Running time: 91 minutes
- Countries: Spain; Italy
- Language: Spanish

La orgía de los muertos (translated as Orgy of the Dead) a.k.a. The Hanging Woman (US theatrical release), Beyond the Living Dead, Return of the Zombies and Bracula: Terror of the Living Dead, is a 1972 Italian/Spanish horror film directed by José Luis Merino, starring Paul Naschy and Dyanik Zurakowska. The film was shot in March 1972, but was not shown in Spanish theaters (as La orgía de los muertos) until September 3, 1973. It was shown theatrically in the U.S. in 1974 as The Hanging Woman, and then was later re-released there as Beyond the Living Dead. It was released in Germany on April 6, 1976 as Der Totenchor der Knochenmänner / Death Chorus of the Skeletons, and re-released in Germany on March 1, 1977 as Die Bestie aus dem Totenreich / The Beast from the Death Realm. It was shown in the U.K. as Zombies - Terror of the Living Dead, in France as Les Orgies Macabres, and in Australia as Bracula, Terror of the Living Dead.

Merino, the director, pleaded with Naschy to appear in the film as a personal favor to him, upon learning that Naschy had just finished shooting his Horror Rises From the Tomb in February and was available for a very short time. Naschy originally turned him down, as he thought the brief role of Igor the gravedigger was too unimportant and lackluster. Merino allowed Naschy to rework the script and beef up the character, adding a necrophilia angle to Igor. Ironically, Naschy's gravedigger wound up becoming the most memorable character in the whole film.

In April 1980, the German distributor Nobis-Film negotiated a deal to re-release this film yet again in Germany, this time under the title Die Nackte Göttin der Zombies / The Naked Goddess of the Zombies, but the deal fell through at the last minute.

== Plot ==
Serge Chekov inherits his uncle's estate, only to discover that Professor Droila, a mad scientist, has taken residence in the basement.

The film opens with the beautiful, red-headed woman (the titular “hanging woman”) named Mary going through a crypt to fiddle with the corpse of the late Count. We begin to see a shadow creep towards Mary inside the crypt and she is enveloped while screaming as we cut away. Shortly after we meet Serge as he comes into town. He accidentally stumbles across the hanged corpse of our red-headed victim. Serge appropriately freaks out and desperately tries to awaken the townspeople by banging on windows, doors, and ringing town bells but the most attention he gets is people blowing out their candles. Serve is incredulous at the town’s indifference. He is reluctantly let inside by a mother and son pair, where Serge (and the audience) receives some exposition.

Serge is later finds himself at his uncle’s castle/estate, and a fiery detective does not believe Mary (found out to be a direct relative of Serge) died from suicide via hanging; he sees dragging marks in the dirt and other evidence of murder! In fact, he insinuates that Serge was the one with the most motive as he stood to inherit everything. Serge replies that he never even knew his uncle or Mary, and for all he knew his “inheritance” is a bunch of debt.

All the meanwhile, there are subplots hatching where Professor Droila is up to shenanigans in his basement lab, infusing life into dead things like frogs by using electricity. He wonders aloud what might happen to a human if he could give the same “treatment” right at the moment of death. Additionally, professor’s daughter Doris Droila is feuding with Countess Nadia for Serge’s attention and inheritance. Both have their own angles, but Nadia appears more nefarious as she secretly invokes black magic and summons Igor (the grave digger) to … do something(?) to her while she gets naked. A little later, Doris is open with Serge in why she doesn’t want him to sell the estate per Nadia’s request. She wants to restore/save her father’s work in the laboratory underneath the home. And in case we had any doubts whether our protagonist was a sleaze or not, he commences to make a nonplussed Doris get naked and kiss him while saying “I always prefer to sample the product before purchasing” (or something just as gross). [He also slept with Nadia earlier so the guy is certainly enjoying his trip so far, other than the dead lady].

The scene continues with a close-up of the half-naked Doris’s face and a tear steaming down her cheek. The hero of the story goes on to tell her “well, there’s no point in going on; you’re the stupidest girl there ever was”. He then reassures Doris he already made a decision this morning to not sell the laboratory. He also asks her to get dressed before he begins to feel guilty. Doris says something about the hanging woman’s diary that triggers a clue and off they run together (literally hand in hand) on a mission.

[We are now just over halfway through the film.] They find the diary and it reveals the count was in constant fear of death. The believe the hanging woman was in the crypt to help him fulfill his secret and “take it to the grave”. (No subtitles, doing my best). The two go off and distract some guards to gain access to the crypt. The bodies are missing so Serge and Doris report back to the group. Everyone suspects the gravedigger of foul antics. The professor manages to ask Serge of his plans to sell the estate. He confirms he will and “tomorrow isn’t soon enough” for him to light outta town.

Nadia suggests they hold a seance to contact Mary. It’s a cool scene with a bunch of open mouths, but ultimately Nadia is attacked and strangled by a bearded figure from behind.

Adventures ensue with Serge and Doris attempting to solve the mystery of the murders because at every turn the police continue to blame Serge, even going so far as shooting him in the arm and handcuffing him to a bed. This was after Doris and Chekov (Serge) were attacked by punching zombies and separated. The investigator immediately assumes she was dead and Serge was her killer. While out trying to prove this, Professor Droila reveals himself to be the mastermind just as Checkov goes through the Rolodex of memories in his head and comes to the same conclusion. They talk smack to each other and the professor proceeds to bring in the zombified Gravedigger while giving his villainous monologue (basically, everyone had to die because they knew of his plans and Serge will be framed for all the murders).

As Chekov listens further, he learns that Droila is reanimating the dead with the help of a necrophiliac grave robber by the name of Igor. Droila coolly reveals his entire plan and how he ordered the deaths of the Count, Mary, Nadia, Gravedigger, and others in order to protect “the secret”. In the end, Chekhov turns the tables by informing the professor his daughter is missing and may be in dangers. Droila seems legitimately disturbed by this and the hesitation enables Serge to decapitste the Grabedigger zombie threat.

Ultimately, Droila's zombies turn against him and carnage ensues in the depths of the castle caves and crypts. As Droila is being group-strangled by his creations, is a final moment of compassion for his daughter he yells the secret to destroying the zombies—fire. The police arrive late, firing bullets wildly like idiots, and being wrong about every accusation. Serge is exonerated and seemingly lives happily ever after…or so we think, credits roll as a zombie hand sticks out of a coffin during a procession…

== Cast ==
- Stelvio Rosi (credited as Stan Cooper) as Serge Chekov
- Dyanik Zurakowska as Doris Droila
- Paul Naschy as Igor the necrophiliac
- Gérard Tichy as Professor Leon Droila
- Maria Pia Conte as Countess Nadia Minajli
- Aurora de Alba as Mary Minajli
- Carlos Quiney as Ivan the butler
- Isarco Ravaioli as the Mayor
- Pasquales Basile as the detective
- Eleonora Vargas
- Carla Mancini

== Release ==
Since the 1980s, the film has been released on VHS Home Video over the years under three different titles...The Hanging Woman, Return of the Zombies and Beyond the Living Dead.

The Troma DVD release (as The Hanging Woman) was on September 29, 2009 in the USA, with audio commentary by director Jose Luis Merino, an interview with actor Paul Naschy, and as a bonus, the seldom seen Sid Pink film "The Sweet Sound of Death" (starring Dyanik Zurakowska).

== Reception ==
Writing in The Zombie Movie Encyclopedia, Peter Dendle said, "Scenic nineteenth-century Skopje forms the eerie and beautiful background for this grab bag of twisted motifs, suspect ideology, and gruesome zombies." Jonathan Rigby, in his 2016 book Euro Gothic: Classics of Continental Horror Cinema, noted that "The film boasts an exciting cemetery pursuit, a brilliant seance sequence in which the dead nobleman returns, even an absurd love-making scene in which Rosi and Pia Conte revolve in space. But perhaps its chief charm is, unusually, its English dub track. Rome's veteran ADR director Nick Alexander had a whale of a time here, adapting the dialogue into a series of waggish one-liners."

Bill Gibron of PopMatters rated it 7/10 and wrote, "While not a classic, The Hanging Woman definitely has its high points. It’s got some great locations, a splash of sinister finesse, more than a few ripe red herrings, and a performance by Naschy that’s not to be missed." Stuart Galbraith IV of DVD Talk rated it 2/5 stars and wrote, "It's tough being negative on what was obviously a labor of love for those involved with its release, but The Hanging Woman (1973), a Spanish horror-mystery featuring beefy genre heavyweight Paul Naschy in a supporting role, is a big disappointment." David Johnson of DVD Verdict wrote, "There are some premium bizzaro moments to be found in The Hanging Woman" and recommended it to fans of Naschy and slow-paced Hammer Films.
