= Once upon a Crime (1992 film) =

1992 film by Eugene Levy

Once Upon a Crime...
- Theatrical release poster
- Directed by: Eugene Levy
- Written by: Charles Shyer; Nancy Meyers; Steve Kluger
- Based on: Crimen by: Rodolfo Sonego; Giorgio Arlorio; Stefano Strucchi; Luciano Vincenzoni
- Produced by: Dino De Laurentiis
- Starring: John Candy; James Belushi; Cybill Shepherd; Sean Young; Richard Lewis; Ornella Muti; Giancarlo Giannini; George Hamilton
- Cinematography: Giuseppe Rotunno
- Edited by: Patrick Kennedy
- Music by: Richard Gibbs
- Distributed by: Metro-Goldwyn-Mayer
- Release date: March 6, 1992
- Running time: 94 minutes
- Country: United States
- Language: English
- Budget: $18 million
- Box office: $8.6 million

Once Upon a Crime... is a 1992 American ensemble black comedy mystery film, starring Richard Lewis, John Candy, James Belushi, Cybill Shepherd, Sean Young and Ornella Muti. The film was directed by Eugene Levy. It is the remake of Mario Camerini's 1960 Italian comedy film Crimen.

== Plot ==
A series of couples are in Monte Carlo, Monaco and their lives get intertwined during a murder investigation. Augie Morosco is a reformed gambler whose wife Elena is concluding a business deal, while Neil Schwary is a gambler looking to strike it big and whose wife Marilyn is hoping to buy some designer clothes. Julian Peters and Phoebe met each other in Rome and are attempting to return dachshund Napoleon to the wealthy Madam Van Dougan.

Madam Van Dougan is found murdered and the interactions between Julian and Phoebe and the other couples begin to look increasingly suspicious, as Inspector Bonnard needs to unravel the clues. Augie returns to gambling, Elena has an affair and Julian sells and repurchases Napoleon.

== Cast ==
- John Candy as Augie Morosco
- James Belushi as Neil Schwary
- Cybill Shepherd as Marilyn Schwary
- Sean Young as Phoebe
- Richard Lewis as Julian Peters
- Ornella Muti as Elena Morosco
- Giancarlo Giannini as Inspector Bonnard
- George Hamilton as Alfonso de la Pena
- Roberto Sbaratto as Detective Toussaint
- Joss Ackland as Hercules Popodopoulos
- Ann Way as Housekeeper
- Geoffrey Andrews as Butler
- Caterina Boratto as Madame de Senneville
- Elsa Martinelli as Carla
- Eugene Levy as Casino Cashier (uncredited)

== Reception ==
Janet Maslin of The New York Times said the film was not funny, and adding "As a general rule, films whose plots revolve around lost dogs are apt to be short on comic inspiration, and this one is no exception." Sean Young was nominated for a Golden Raspberry Award for Worst Supporting Actress at the 13th Golden Raspberry Awards, which she lost to Estelle Getty in Stop! Or My Mom Will Shoot.

== Adaptation ==
In 2006, Abbas–Mustan known for directing thriller movies in Bollywood, adapted the film as 36 China Town starring Shahid Kapoor and Kareena Kapoor. It is a frame-by-frame, shot-for-shot imitation of Once Upon a Crime.

== See also ==
- Blame It on the Bellboy
