= Hot Potato (1979 film) =

- Directed by: Steno
- Written by: Steno; Giorgio Arlorio; Enrico Vanzina
- Produced by: Achille Manzotti
- Starring: Renato Pozzetto
- Cinematography: Giorgio Arlorio
- Edited by: Raimondo Crociani
- Music by: Totò Savio
- Release date: 16 November 1979
- Running time: 100 minutes
- Country: Italy
- Language: Italian

Hot Potato (Italian: La patata bollente) is a 1979 Italian-style comedy film directed by Steno. The film stars Renato Pozzetto, Massimo Ranieri, Edwige Fenech, Mario Scarpetta and Clara Colosimo.

The film discusses a range of issues such as homophobia in the political left, Anni di piombo violence, working class culture, and the sustainability of Eurocommunism.

== Plot ==
Bernardo Mambelli nicknamed "il Gandi" is a PCI militant and pugilist working at a Milanese paint factory. One night, he sees a fascist gang beating a frail young man. He saves the man and brings him to his house to learn that he is Claudio, a homosexual.

With nowhere to go and recovering from the assault, Claudio starts staying at Bernardo's house but a series of typical misunderstandings lead his comrades as well as his girlfriend Maria to believing that he has "turned gay". Bernardo is now seen as a potential lost cause and the ongoings soon reveal a "hot potato" situation for him.

== Cast ==
- Renato Pozzetto as Bernardo Mambelli nicknamed "il Gandi"
- Massimo Ranieri as Claudio
- Edwige Fenech as Maria
- Mario Scarpetta as Walter
- Clara Colosimo as Elvira, the doorwoman
- Luca Sportelli as Elvira's husband
- Sergio Ciulli as Maravigli
- Adriana Russo as Maria's best friend
- Umberto Raho as the doctor
- Ennio Antonelli as laborer

== Production ==
The film was initially conceived as a segment of a two-part film titled "Fa male mischiare" (lit. 'Mixing Hurts ') directed by Nanni Loy; the two segments were eventually developed into full-length films, the other of them becoming Loy's Café Express.

== Reception ==
Author Sergio Rigoletto wrote that it "was a film grounded in a changing political climate that revealed a considerable shift of attitudes within the Italian Left, with the Communist Party finally showing a willingness to engage in a dialogue with homosexual activist groups." Andrea Sangiovanni argues that "despite its sex comedy title, it was in fact the story of the identity crisis of a metalworker due to a chance encounter with a young homosexual man."

Casa del Cinema opined it is "the first Italian comedy film entirely built on a gay situation with any substance and credibility; Giorgio Arlorio intended it to be a slightly more serious film than it turned out, but it's still quite entertaining; Steno doesn't push the situation to its extremes, it's not the right time yet, but seeing the average worker's reactions to diversity isn't bad." The Tribune and the Niagara Falls Review gave it a rating of 2½ stars out of 5.

== See also ==
- Cinema of Italy
- List of Italian films of 1979
- List of LGBTQ-related films of 1979
