= Battle of the Last Panzer =

- VHS cover of 'Battle of the Last Panzer'
- Directed by: José Luis Merino
- Written by: Giuseppe Chiarolla; Giuliana Garavaglia; José Luis Merino
- Starring: Stan Cooper; Erna Schürer; Guy Madison
- Cinematography: Emanuele Di Cola
- Edited by: Sandro Lena
- Music by: Angelo Francesco Lavagnino
- Distributed by: Troma Entertainment
- Release date: 1969
- Running time: 91 minutes
- Language: Spanish

Battle of the Last Panzer (Spanish: La batalla del último Panzer, Italian: La battaglia dell'ultimo panzer, also known as The Last Panzer Battalion) is a 1969 Spanish-Italian war film directed by José Luis Merino and distributed in America by Troma Entertainment. The film looks through the eyes of the German offense during World War II, specifically a German tank crew who, after losing a battle, struggle to get home.

== Cast ==
- Stan Cooper as Lt. Hunter
- Erna Schurer as Jeanette
- Guy Madison as Lofty
- Rubén Rojo as Sgt. Schultz
