= Addio Alexandra =

- Directed by: Enzo Battaglia
- Starring: Pier Angeli; Glenn Saxson; Colette Descombes
- Music by: Piero Piccioni
- Release date: 1969
- Country: Italy
- Language: Italian

Addio Alexandra is an Italian romantic drama film, released in 1969. It stars Pier Angeli, Glenn Saxson and Colette Descombes. The film premiered out of competition at the 30th Venice International Film Festival.
