= Bridge over the Elbe =

- Directed by: León Klimovsky
- Written by: Adriano Bolzoni; Lou Carrigan; Antonio Fos
- Starring: Tab Hunter; Howard Ross; Erika Wallner
- Cinematography: Mario Pacheco
- Music by: Michele Lacerenza
- Production companies: Atlántida Films; Leone-Daiano Film
- Distributed by: Atlántida Films (Spain)
- Release date: 23 July 1969
- Running time: 94 minutes
- Countries: Italy; Spain
- Languages: Italian; Spanish

Bridge over the Elbe or The Legion of No Return (Italian: Quel maledetto ponte sull'Elba, Spanish: No importa morir) is a 1969 war film directed by León Klimovsky and starring Tab Hunter, Howard Ross and Erika Wallner.

== Synopsis ==
Germany, 1945, in the waning days of the Second World War, American and Soviet forces are swiftly advancing. To thwart the Red Army from advancing too far westward, the U.S. command instructs Sergeant Richard to demolish a bridge over the Elbe with a team of just five men. However, the bridge is heavily fortified by German soldiers, making the mission exceedingly difficult.

== Cast ==
- Tab Hunter as Richards
- Howard Ross as Charlie Hines
- Erika Wallner as Erika
- Claudio Trionfi as Johnny Eisenhower
- Rosanna Yanni as Christina
- Óscar Pellicer as Stiles
- Ángel del Pozo as Rod
- Gaspar 'Indio' González as Doyle
- Daniele Vargas as Major Larson
- Alfonso de la Vega SS Officer
- José Guardiola German Commander
- Antonio Delgado
- Barta Barri Sgt. Mueller

== Bibliography ==
- Victoria Ruétalo & Dolores Tierney. Latsploitation, Exploitation Cinemas, and Latin America. Routledge, 2009.
