= Colette Descombes =

French actress

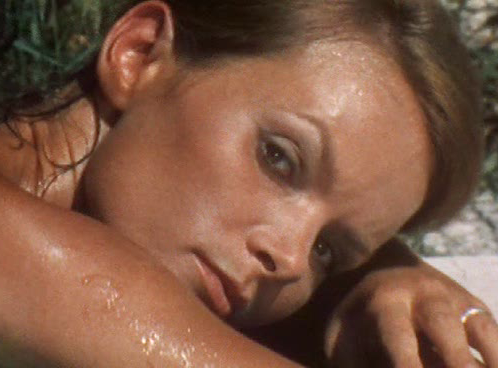
Colette Descombes in Monika (1974)

Colette Descombes is a French film actress, active between 1961 and 1978. She was born on January 26, 1943, in Romans sur Isère, department of Drôme (France).

Colette Descombes made her film debut in Les nymphettes, a French drama directed by Henri Zaphiratos in which she had the main role, then starred with some regularity in Italian, French and Spanish productions.

== Selected filmography ==
- Juventud a la intemperie (1961)
- Brigitte et Brigitte (1966)
- Paranoia (1969)
- How, When and with Whom (1969)
- Your Hands on My Body (1970)
- A cuore freddo (1971)
- Addio, Alexandra (1971)
- Monika (1974)
- Polizia selvaggia (1977)
