= José Luis Merino =

Spanish film director and screenwriter (1927–2019)

Jose Luis Merino (10 June 1927 – 2 July 2019) was a Spanish film writer and director who developed a cult following among horror film fans.

== Biography ==
Merino was born in 1927 in Madrid, Spain, as José Luis Merino Boves, and went on to direct around 30 films during his long and varied career as director and writer (1958–1990), most of them action/adventure films, crime dramas, spaghetti westerns, war movies and costume dramas involving Robin Hood, pirates, Zorro etc. He is known to horror film fans for the two horror movies he directed in the early 1970s: Orgy of the Dead (a.k.a. The Hanging Woman) and Scream of the Demon Lover (a.k.a. Ivanna), which have both become cult classics over the years. Merino never considered himself a horror film director, he chose rather to favor his many action/adventure films. He died on July 2, 2019, at age 92.

== Films ==
=== Director ===
- 1958: Aquellos tiempos del cuplé
- 1960: El vagabundo y la estrella
- 1964: Alféreces provisionales
- 1966: Por un puñado de canciones
- 1967: Frontera al sur (as Joseph Marvin)
- 1968: Réquiem para el gringo
- 1968: Colpo sensazionale al servizio del Sifar
- 1969: La batalla del último Panzer
- 1969: Comando al infierno
- 1970: Las cinco advertencias de Satanás
- 1970: Robin Hood, el arquero invencible
- 1970: More Dollars for the MacGregors
- 1970: Scream of the Demon Lover (a.k.a. Ivanna)
- 1970: Consigna: matar al comandante en jefe
- 1970: El tigre del Kyber
- 1970: La última aventura del Zorro
- 1971: El Zorro caballero de la justicia
- 1971: El Zorro de Monterrey
- 1972: La rebelión de los bucaneros (a.k.a. Pirates of Blood Island)
- 1973: The Hanging Woman (a.k.a. La orgía de los muertos)
- 1974: Juegos de sociedad
- 1974: Tarzán en las minas del rey Salomón (as J.L. Merino Boves)
- 1974: Juan Ciudad: ese desconocido (Documentary short)
- 1976: Sábado, chica, motel ¡qué lío aquel!
- 1977: Marcada por los hombres
- 1979: 7 cabalgan hacia la muerte
- 1982: Dejadme vivir (Short)
- 1983: USA, violación y venganza
- 1983: La avispita Ruinasa
- 1984: Gritos de ansiedad
- 1990: Superagentes en Mallorca

=== Writer ===
- 1958: Aquellos tiempos del cuplé
- 1960: El vagabundo y la estrella
- 1964: Alféreces provisionales
- 1966: Por un puñado de canciones
- 1967: Frontera al sur
- 1968: La ametralladora
- 1969: La batalla del último Panzer
- 1969: Hora cero: Operación Rommel
- 1969: Comando al infierno
- 1970: Las cinco advertencias de Satanás
- 1970: Robin Hood, el arquero invencible
- 1970: La muerte busca un hombre
- 1970: Scream of the Demon Lover (a.k.a. Ivanna)
- 1970: Consigna: matar al comandante en jefe
- 1970: El tigre del Kyber
- 1971: El Zorro caballero de la justicia
- 1971: Como un ídolo de arena
- 1971: El Zorro de Monterrey
- 1972: La rebelión de los bucaneros
- 1973: La orgía de los muertos
- 1974: Tarzán en las minas del rey Salomón
- 1974: Juan Ciudad: ese desconocido (Documentary short)
- 1975: En la cresta de la ola
- 1976: Sábado, chica, motel ¡qué lío aquel!
- 1977: Marcada por los hombres
- 1979: 7 cabalgan hacia la muerte
- 1982: Dejadme vivir (Short)
- 1983: USA, violación y venganza
- 1983: La avispita Ruinasa
- 1984: Gritos de ansiedad
- 1990: Superagentes en Mallorca

=== Actor ===
- 1979: Las verdes praderas
- 1979: 7 cabalgan hacia la muerte - Zachary
- 1980: Viva la clase media - Camarero
- 1981: El crack - Meri
- 1983: El crack dos - Meri
- 1997: La herida luminosa
- 1998: The Grandfather - Camarero casino
- 2000: You're the One - Aldeano 1
- 2004: Tiovivo c. 1950 - (final film role)
