= Antonio Casale =

Italian actor (1932–2017)

- Born: May 17, 1932; Acceglio
- Died: February 4, 2017 (aged 84)
- Occupation: Film actor

Antonio Casale (17 May 1932 – 4 February 2017) was an Italian film actor of the 1960s and 1970s who appeared in mostly Spaghetti Western Italian films between 1965 and 1976.

Although his later roles were more prominent, Casale is probably most known worldwide for his brief appearance as the dying Bill Carson in Sergio Leone's Spaghetti Western The Good, the Bad and the Ugly in 1966, a film that has consistently been voted one of the greatest of all time.

== Filmography ==
- Maciste il vendicatore dei Maya (1965) - Berak
- Sicario 77, vivo o morto (1966)
- The Good, the Bad and the Ugly (1966) - Jackson / Bill Carson
- Revenge for Revenge (1968)
- Le salamandre (1969) - Dr. Henry Duval
- Dal nostro inviato a Copenaghen (1970) - Borg
- Quickly ...spari e baci a colazione (1971)
- Riuscirà l'avvocato Franco Benenato a sconfiggere il suo acerrimo nemico il pretore Ciccio De Ingras? (1971)
- The Case Is Closed, Forget It (1971)
- Duck, You Sucker! (1971) - Notary on Stagecoach
- What Have You Done to Solange? (1972) - Mr. Newton
- The Grand Duel (1972) - Hole - Bounty Hunter
- Diario di una vergine romana (1973)
- The Violent Professionals (1973) - Casardi
- Seven Hours of Violence (1973)
- Anna, quel particolare piacere (1973) - Sogliani's henchman
- Dagli archivi della polizia criminale (1973) - Il beduino
- The Arena (1974) - Lucan
- Una donna per 7 bastardi (1974) - Carl
- Il tempo dell'inizio (1974)
- Autopsy (1975) - Inspector Silvestri
- The Suspect (1975) - Resta
- Silent Action (1975) - Giovanni Andreassi - aka Massù
- Syndicate Sadists (1975) - Philip Duval
- Lips of Lurid Blue (1975) - Bar Owner
- Free Hand for a Tough Cop (1976) - El Greco Tomati
- Mannaja (1977) - Dahlman
- Caligula (1979) - Roman (uncredited) (final film role)
