= Carlos Quiney =

Spanish actor

- Born: 11 July 1937; Las Palmas, Canary Islands, Spain
- Died: 5 May 2007 (aged 69); Las Palmas, Canary Islands, Spain
- Other names: Carlos Alfonso Quiney Lodos; Charles Quiney
- Occupation: Actor
- Years active: 1968–1973 (film)

Carlos Quiney (1937–2007) was a Spanish film actor.

== Selected filmography ==
- Hell Commandos (1969)
- Zorro's Latest Adventure (1969)
- Bullets Over Dallas (1970)
- Scream of the Demon Lover (1970)
- More Dollars for the MacGregors (1970)
- Zorro, Rider of Vengeance (1971)
- Zorro the Invincible (1971)
- Pirates of Blood Island (1972)
- Dracula, the Terror of the Living Dead (1973)

== Bibliography ==
- Pitts, Michael R. Western Movies: A Guide to 5,105 Feature Films. McFarland, 2012.
