= Claudio Trionfi =

Italian film and television actor

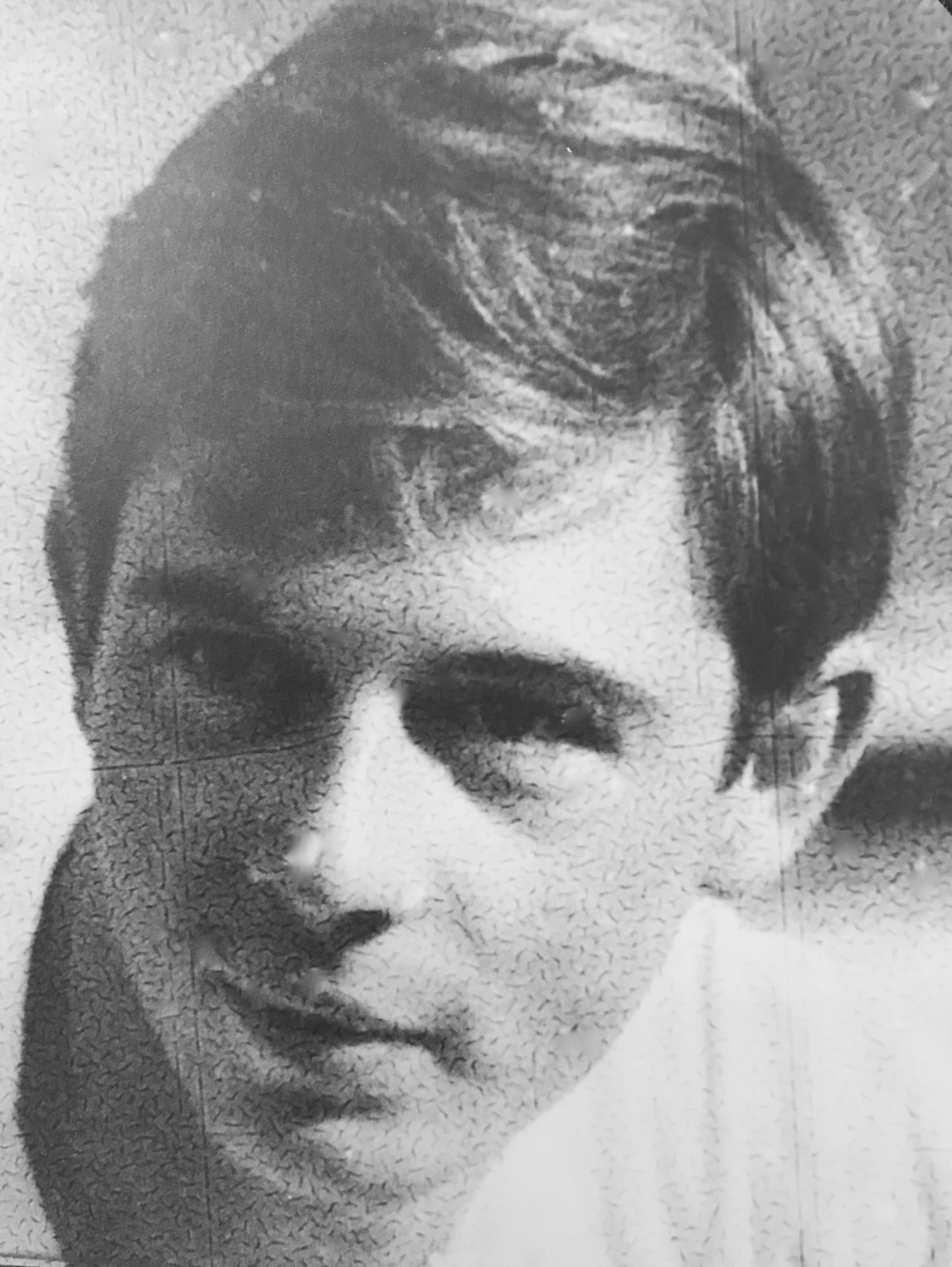
- Trionfi in 1969
- Born: 15 October 1942 (age 83); Rome, Lazio, Italy
- Occupation: Actor
- Years active: 1967-

Claudio Trionfi is an Italian film and television actor.

== Selected filmography ==
- China Is Near (1967)
- The Protagonists (1968)
- Death Sentence (1968)
- Bridge Over the Elbe (1969)
- Normal Young Man (1969)
- Double Face (1969)
- More Dollars for the MacGregors (1970)
- Black Killer (1971)
- They Have Changed Their Face (1971)
- Morel's Invention (1974)

== Bibliography ==
- Pitts, Michael R. Western Movies: A Guide to 5,105 Feature Films. McFarland, 2012.
