= Daniel Sorano National Theater =

Theatre in Senegal

- Théâtre national Daniel-Sorano
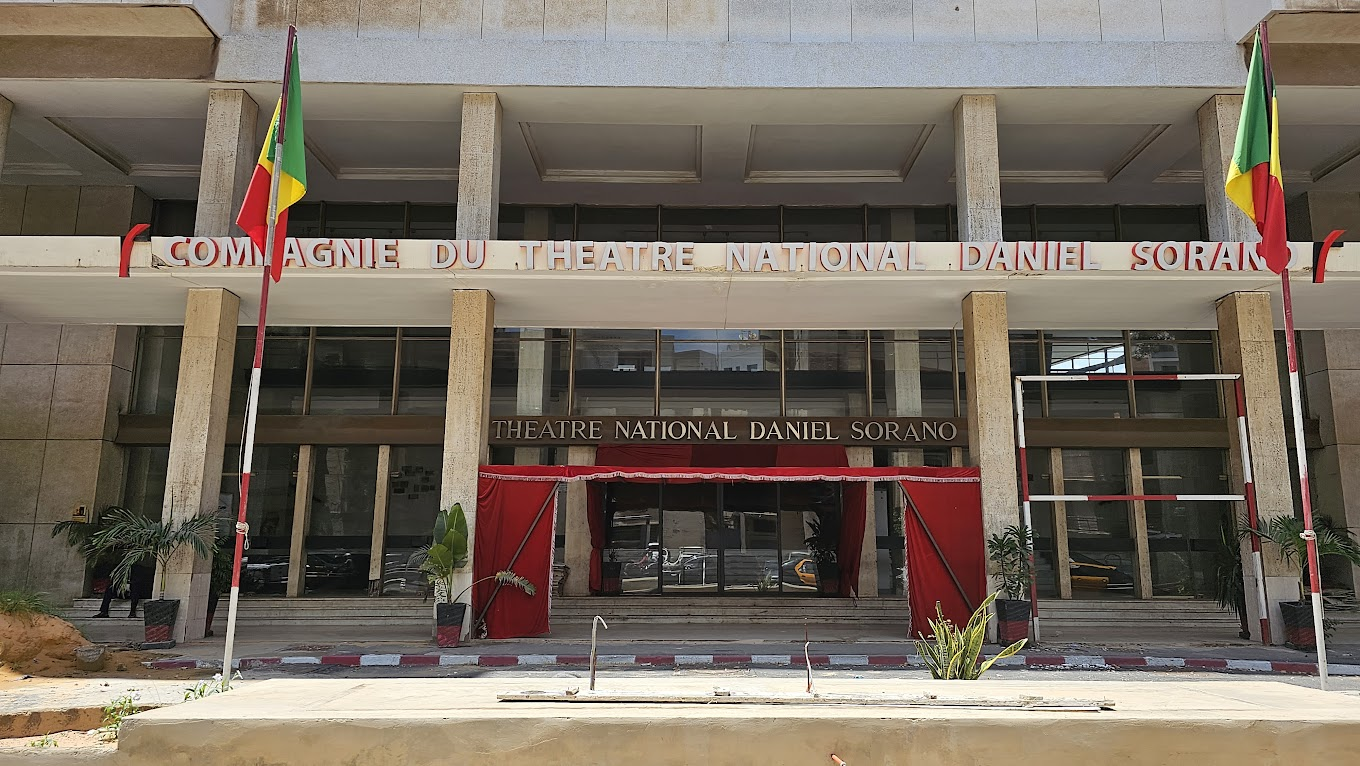
- The theater's main entrance in 2023
- Founded: 1965
- Founder: Léopold Sédar Senghor
- Purpose: Theatre company
- Headquarters: 45 Boulevard de la République, Dakar, Senegal
- Coordinates: 14°39′59″N 17°26′23″W

The Daniel Sorano National Theater (French: Théâtre national Daniel Sorano; TNDS) is a performing arts venue in Dakar that serves as the national theater of Senegal.

Its name pays homage to the French-Senegalese actor Daniel Sorano.

== History ==
The Daniel Sorano National Theater was inaugurated on July 17, 1965, by Senegalese President Léopold Sédar Senghor. Its first season opened with a tragedy in Wolof telling the story of Lat Jor, the last ruler of the Kingdom of Cayor: Lat Dior, ou le chemin de l’honneur, written by Thierno Bâ and directed by Alioune Oumy Diop. That season also notably featured Abdou Anta Ka's La fille des dieux. The following year, the national theater hosted the first World Festival of Black Arts.

The theater was directed for 20 years by the actor and director Maurice Sonar Senghor, who also created the National Ballet of Senegal. As of 2025, the company's director general is Ousmane Barro Dione.

Notable past performers at the theater include Douta Seck, Doura Mané, Jacqueline Scott-Lemoine, Oumar Seck, and Awa Sène Sarr, among many others. Highlights among past productions include Aimé Césaire's La Tragédie du roi Christophe, Alioune Badara Bèye's Nder en flammes and Dialawali, terre de feu, Cheik Aliou Ndao's Du sang pour un trône ou Gouye Ndiouli, and Marouba Fall's Aline Sitoye, la dame de Cabrousse.

The theater underwent major renovations in 1999. It can accommodate more than 1,000 audience members.

== Organization ==
The Daniel Sorano National Theater encompasses three independent but unified groups:

- The National Ballet Ensemble
- The National Dramatic Troupe
- The Traditional Lyric Ensemble
