= Giorgio Arlorio =

Italian screenwriter and director (1929–2019)

- Born: 27 February 1929; Turin, Piedmont, Italy
- Died: 25 July 2019 (aged 90); Rome, Lazio, Italy
- Occupations: Screenwriter and director
- Years active: 1951–2011

Giorgio Arlorio (27 February 1929 – 25 July 2019) was an Italian screenwriter and director.

== Biography ==
Born in Turin, Arlorio began his career in 1951 as an assistant director for Pietro Germi, Mario Soldati and Michelangelo Antonioni, while between the 1960s and the 1970s became a regular collaborator of Gillo Pontecorvo and Carlo Lizzani, with whom he co-wrote some of their films. He also directed some political documentaries.

For many years, Arlorio taught Screenwriting at the Centro Sperimentale di Cinematografia.

Arlorio died in his home in Rome on 25 July 2019, at the age of 90.

== Partial filmography ==
=== Screenwriter ===
- Esterina (1959)
- Crimen (1960)
- The Golden Arrow (1962)
- The Shortest Day (1963)
- The Head of the Family (1967)
- Arabella (1967)
- The Mercenary (1968)
- Burn! (1969)
- Zorro (1975)
- Ogro (1979)
- Hot Potato (1979)
- Days of Inspector Ambrosio (1988)
- Once Upon a Crime (1992)
