= Burn! =

1969 film by Gillo Pontecorvo

- U.S. theatrical poster
- Italian: Queimada
- Directed by: Gillo Pontecorvo
- Written by: Franco Solinas; Giorgio Arlorio
- Produced by: Alberto Grimaldi
- Starring: Marlon Brando; Evaristo Márquez; Renato Salvatori
- Cinematography: Giuseppe Ruzzolini; Marcello Gatti
- Edited by: Mario Morra
- Music by: Ennio Morricone
- Production company: Produzioni Europee Associati
- Distributed by: Produzioni Europee Associati (Italy); United Artists (International)
- Release date: 21 December 1969
- Running time: 129 minutes (Italy); 112 minutes (International)
- Country: Italy; France
- Languages: Italian; English; French

Burn! (original Italian title: Queimada, Portuguese and Spanish for "Burnt" or "Burned") is a 1969 historical war drama film directed by Gillo Pontecorvo. Set in the mid-19th century, the film stars Marlon Brando as a British agent provocateur sent to overthrow a Portuguese colony in the Caribbean by manipulating a slave revolt to serve the interests of the sugar trade, and the complications that arise from the formation of a subsequent puppet state.

The fictional plot is partly based on the activities of American filibuster William Walker, after whom the main character is named, and his 1855 invasion of Nicaragua. Screenwriters Franco Solinas and Giorgio Arlorio also drew on the experiences of intelligence agent Edward Lansdale, who served the United States government in the Philippines and Indochina in the 1950s through the 60s, and the Cuban Revolution. Pauline Kael characterized the film as a celebration of the "proletarian strength of Third World faces, the Algerians and the slaves."

The film is an Italian and French co-production by Alberto Grimaldi, distributed internationally by United Artists. It features a musical score composed by Ennio Morricone.

== Plot ==
In 1844, the British Admiralty sends Sir William Walker, an agent provocateur, to the island of Queimada (literally "Burned" or "Burnt"), a Portuguese colony in the Lesser Antilles. The British government seeks to open the island to economic exploitation by the Antilles Royal Sugar Company. Walker's task is to organize an uprising of enslaved Africans against the Portuguese regime, which the British government intend to replace with a government dominated by pliable white planters.

When he arrives in Queimada, Walker befriends the charismatic José Dolores, whom he entices to lead the slave rebellion, and induces leading landowners to reject Portuguese rule. Dolores's rebellion is successful, and Walker arranges the assassination of the Portuguese governor in a nighttime coup. Walker establishes a puppet regime beholden to the Antilles Company, headed by the idealistic but ineffectual revolutionary Teddy Sanchez. Walker convinces Dolores to recognize the new regime and to surrender his arms, in exchange for the abolition of slavery. Having succeeded in his mission, he moves on to his next assignment in Indochina.

In 1848, Dolores–disgusted by the new regime's collaboration with the Antilles Company–leads a second uprising, aiming to expel British influence from Queimada. After six years of the uprising, in 1854, the Company returns Walker (after finding him in Plymouth, England) to Queimada with the consent of the Admiralty, tasking him with suppressing the revolt and pacifying the island. Resentful of the company's exploitation of Queimada, President Sanchez is uncooperative. Sanchez is ousted and executed in a coup engineered by Walker, who establishes a regime wholly beholden to the company. British forces are invited to the island; guided by Walker, they rapidly quell the rebellion and capture Dolores. Walker attempts to save Dolores's life due to their past comradery, but the rebel leader rejects his assistance, asserting that freedom is earned, not received.

The government executes Dolores by hanging. Soon after, Walker, guilt-stricken, is accosted as he prepares to depart Queimada. A man greets him just as Dolores did when Walker first arrived on the island, and then stabs him to death. Before dying, Walker looks around and sees himself surrounded by accusatory or passive looks of the poor people in the port.

== Cast ==
- Marlon Brando as Sir William Walker, named after American filibuster William Walker.
- Evaristo Márquez as José Dolores, named after José Dolores Estrada, the Nicaraguan general who defeated the historical Walker.
- Renato Salvatori as Teddy Sanchez
- Norman Hill as Consul Shelton
- Giampiero Albertini as Henry Thompson
- Carlo Palmucci as Jack Martin
- Dana Ghia as Francesca Walker
- Valeria Ferran Wanani as Guarina
- Joseph P. Persaud as Juanito
- Thomas Lyons as General Prada
- Alejandro Obregón as British Major
- Maurice Rodriguez as Ramón
- Cicely Browne as Lady Bella (uncredited)
- Sam Gilman as Man on Ship (uncredited)

== Production ==
Burn! was originally scheduled to be shot entirely in Cartagena, Colombia. Troubled working conditions caused the production to run over-schedule and over-budget, leading to United Artists nearly firing Pontecorvo. Marlon Brando insisted the film be finished and paid for the production to be moved to Morocco, where it could be completed for less money. Other scenes were shot at in Saint-Malo, France; the U.S. Virgin Islands, and Cinecittà Studios.

Alberto Grimaldi originally suggested Sidney Poitier in the role of José Dolores, but Gillo Pontecorvo insisted on casting Evaristo Márquez instead. Marquez was not a professional actor, but an illiterate Colombian herdsman, whom Pontecorvo met while location scouting. Many of the actors were also non-professionals, a neorealist-inspired approach Pontecorvo previously used in The Battle of Algiers.

Marlon Brando had the opportunity to have a role in Butch Cassidy and the Sundance Kid and The Arrangement once again with Elia Kazan, but chose instead to work on this film. He also had to turn down a major role in Ryan's Daughter because of this film's production problems. In his autobiography Brando: Songs My Mother Taught Me, he said: "I did some of my best acting in Burn!". He called Pontecorvo one of the three best directors he ever worked with, alongside Kazan and Bernardo Bertolucci.

In the original script, the fictional island of Queimada was a Spanish protectorate, which many of the historical Caribbean colonies were. The Francoist government pressured the filmmakers to alter the script, and since Portugal accounted for a considerably smaller share of international box-office receipts than Spain, the producers did the economically expedient thing by making the Portuguese the villains. The original conceit is still reflected by the characters having Spanish names and speaking the Spanish language.

The English-language export cut of the film runs 112 minutes, 17 minutes shorter than the original Italian version. Brando was dubbed by Giuseppe Rinaldi for the Italian version. Brando's voice can be heard only in the shorter English-language version.

== Reception ==
The film received critical acclaim in the U.S. and abroad. It was praised for its writing, direction, themes and performances (particularly that of Brando and Márquez). Based on 15 reviews collected by Rotten Tomatoes, the film has an overall approval rating from critics of 80%. By comparison, its 2004 re-release was given an average score of 72 out of 100, based on 4 reviews, by Metacritic, which assigns a rating based on top reviews from mainstream critics.

Pauline Kael, for The New Yorker, said of the film that the treatment was "stilted and visually dead as in a standard swashbuckler."

Many critics have interpreted Burn! within the context of Vietnam War and Cold War, and have praised its raw and unglamorized depictions of colonialism, imperialism, and slavery. David N. Meyer wrote for The Brooklyn Rail, "Burn! is a quietly bleak, unflinching presentation of slavery, post-slavery racial hatreds, the role of race in political power and the colonial manipulation of all of the above. Pontecorvo takes on these themes so clearly and directly—while keeping them secondary to the drama of the narrative—that Burn! becomes a lesson in how few other films ever address them at all."

=== Academic and political responses ===
Historian Natalie Zemon Davis reviewed the film from a historian's perspective and gave it high marks, arguing that it merges historical events that took place in Brazil, Cuba, Santo Domingo, Jamaica, and elsewhere.

The Palestinian-American academic Edward Said (author of Orientalism) praised Burn! (along with Pontecorvo's other film, The Battle of Algiers) as the two films "...stand unmatched and unexcelled since they were made in the 60s. Both films together constitute a political and aesthetic standard never again equaled."

The character José Dolores inspired the logo of the socialist magazine Jacobin.

== Home media ==
Burn! was released in 2005 on DVD by Sony Pictures Home Entertainment (under license from MGM) as a Region 1 DVD, now out of print; it is also offered on Amazon Prime.

The film was released on Blu-Ray in France by Rimini Editions in September 2021. In December 2022, the film made its English-language Blu-Ray debut by Australian label Imprint. The release included both the Italian and international English cuts of the film, and new interviews with editor Mario Morra and filmmaker Marco Pontecorvo (the director's son).

== See also ==
- List of films featuring slavery
