= Alberto Cavallone =

Italian film director (1938–1997)

- Alberto Cavallone in 1965
- Born: 28 August 1938; Milan, Italy
- Died: 12 November 1997 (aged 59); Rome, Italy
- Occupations: Film director and screenwriter

Alberto Cavallone (28 August 1938 – 12 November 1997) was an Italian film director and screenwriter. He was born in Milan, Italy. Cavallone's films are anti-conventional and often contain a mixture of graphic violence, surrealism and eroticism.

== Career ==
When Cavallone was 17 years old, he traveled to Algeria, then in the throes of a war of independence, with a 16mm Paillard motion picture camera. The footage he gathered there formed the structure of his first film effort, La sporca guerra (The Bloody War), intended as a non-aligned political documentary. The film featured an early score by Pino Donaggio. The film, released in 1959, is now lost. His feature debut, Lontano dagli occhi (Out of Sight), the story of an Italian reporter's coverage of a trial in Frankfurt of former Nazi officers for crimes against humanity, was never completed and remains unseen.

After a five-year period of apprenticeship, assisting direction on a score of Italian pictures, Cavallone returned to directing in 1969 with the feature Le salamandre, a story of an interracial ménage-à-trois between a Swedish-American fashion photographer, her lover, a black model, and a French psychologist. It was shot in Tunisia. The film was well-received and Cavallone's profile increased tremendously.

The following year, Cavallone directed the feature Dal nostro inviato a Copenaghen (From Our Copenhagen Correspondent). That film was a story of two U.S. servicemen fresh from Vietnam who go A.W.O.L. from an American base in Germany. They travel to Copenhagen, where both remain haunted by their experiences in Vietnam. One drifts into acting in pornographic films while the other loses his ability to distinguish reality from fantasy and succumbs to violent impulses. Hot on the heels of that picture, Cavallone began directing a musical-comedy that he was forced to abandon in mid-production due to budgetary constraints.

In 1971, Cavallone directed Quickly, spari e baci a colazione, a low-budget affair that utilized discarded sets from bigger pictures and incorporated footage from the uncompleted musical. In 1973, he directed Afrika, set in Ethiopia, a tale of two Italian expatriates, a sexually conflicted painter and his young male lover. The story is embedded in the police procedural staple, the murder investigation, in this case by an Ethiopian chief of police. In 1974, Cavallone directed Zelda, an erotic thriller. The following year, he directed in Turkey and Italy Maldoror, inspired by Comte de Lautréamont's poem Les Chants de Maldoror. The picture failed to secure a distributor and remains unseen by the public.

In 1977, Cavallone released the surreal Spell – Dolce mattatoio, known in the English-speaking world as Man, Woman and Beast. The film is generally regarded as Cavallone's masterpiece and remains his most-exhibited work. Cavallone followed this success with Blue Movie in 1978. This film, too, was a modest success, something that bewildered its director. In 1980, Cavallone directed the surrealist erotic-mystery Blow Job – Soffio erotico and later that year La gemella erotica – Due gocce d’acqua, a project along similar lines. The latter film failed to reach theaters due to the bankruptcy of its distributor.

In 1981, Cavallone directed two surrealist erotic-thrillers, each featuring an achondroplastic dwarf in the lead role: Baby Sitter and Pat. His work after this time devolved into journeyman efforts in various "porns with plots". In 1983, he contributed the story to Umberto Lenzi's fantasy film Ironmaster (aka La guerra di ferro). He also directed the 1984 film I padroni del mondo (Conqueror of the World), a violent barbarian film set in prehistoric times. The early 1990s saw him directing commercials and contributing revisions to screenplays by other screenwriters and storyboards for at least one animated feature. At the time of his death, Cavallone was attempting to helm a comeback feature he called Internet Story.

== Filmography ==
Title	Year	Credited as				Notes	Ref(s)
Title	Year	Director	Screenwriter	Screen story writer	Other	Notes	Ref(s)
La sporca guerra	1963	Yes	Yes	Yes			
Z2 Operazione Circeo	1966	Yes	Yes			Television film	
Per amore... per magia...	1967		Yes				
La lunga sfida	1967		Yes				
Le salamandre	1969	Yes	Yes	Yes			
Dal nostro inviato a Copenaghen	1970	Yes	Yes	Yes			
Quickly...spari e baci a colazione	1971	Yes	Yes	Yes			
Afrika	1973	Yes	Yes				
Zelda	1974	Yes	Yes	Yes			
Spell – Dolce mattatoio	1977	Yes	Yes	Yes			
Blue Movie	1978	Yes	Yes	Yes			
Blow Job (Soffio erotico)	1980	Yes	Yes	Yes			
La gemella erotica	1980	Yes	Yes	Yes			
Baby Sitter	1982	Yes	Yes	Yes		as Baron Corvo	
Pat, una donna particolare	1982	Yes	Yes	Yes		as Baron Corvo	
Ironmaster	1983			Yes			
Master of the World	1983	Yes	Yes				
...e il terzo gode	1983	Yes	Yes			as Baron Corvo	

== Bibliography ==
- Poppi, Roberto (2002). I registi: dal 1930 ai giorni nostri (in Italian). Gremese Editore. p. 101. ISBN 9788884401717.
