= Feridun Zaimoğlu =

Turkish-German writer

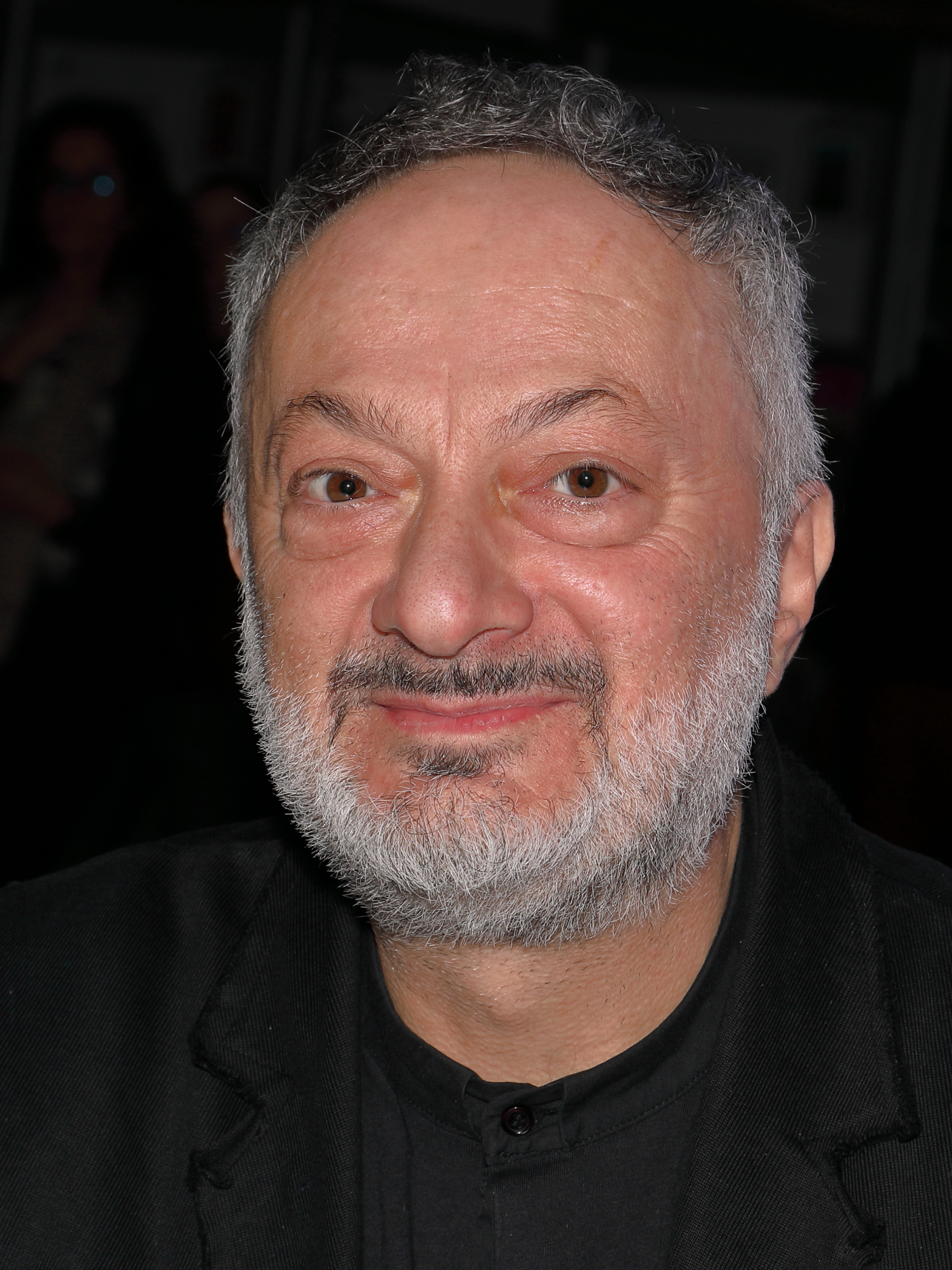
Zaimoğlu in 2025

Feridun Zaimoğlu (born 4 December 1964, in Bolu) is a German author and visual artist of Turkish descent.

His central themes are the problems of the second and third generation of Turkish immigrants to Germany.

== Life ==
Feridun Zaimoğlu, born in Bolu/Turkey, came to West Germany with his parents in 1965. Until 1985 he lived in West Berlin and Munich, and then began studying medicine and arts in Kiel, where he is still living. He works as an author and journalist. His essays and critiques of literary have appeared in leading German newspapers, such as Die Zeit, Die Welt, SPEX and the Tagesspiegel. From 1999 to 2000 he worked in Mannheim at the National theatre. In 2003 he became Island poet on the island of Sylt, and in 2004 he was a visiting fellow at the Freie Universität Berlin.

His first book "Kanak Sprak" 1995 attempts to express the authentic, tough and subversive power of slang language spoken by Turkish male youths in Germany, and calls for a new self-confidence.

The grotesque figure of the maganda – as can also be traced in popular satirical Turkish magazines – emerges as an "important medium for the formulation of new gender identities, urban subjectivities, and class relations" (Ayse Oncu in References 1, p. 187). His book became inspirational for the group "kanak attak".

In 2005, his installation of flags with the title "KanakAttak – The 3rd Turkish siege of Vienna" was exhibited at the Kunsthalle Wien, an art gallery in Vienna. It refers to the Siege of Vienna (17 July – 12 September 1683) that was an expedition by the Turks against the Habsburg Holy Roman Emperor Leopold I that ended in their defeat.

In his book, Leyla, he describes the life in a small Turkish village. It is a kind of 'reinvention' after years of writing in an explicitly male style, as he takes first time in his writing career the female viewpoint. In an interview he describes that it took him one and a half years to prepare for this fiction novel that he finished in 2004 and which is published in 2006.

His novels have appeared on the longlist of the German Book Prize in the years 2006, 2008, 2014, 2015, and 2025.

== Kanak Attak ==
The group that Feridun Zaimoğlu helped to start is a "broadly-based anti-racist project" made up of "different people from diverse backgrounds who share a commitment to eradicate racism from German society". This broad base allows Germans of all colors and ethnicities to join in working toward the cause of ending "the assignment of ethnic identities and roles; the 'we' and 'them'". Although this abandonment of the 'we' and 'them' may seem like the first step toward allowing Turkish-Germans, in addition to other ethnic groups that have come to Germany as migrant workers, to assimilate into German society and the German culture, that is hardly the case.

The "anti-assimilationalist stance represented by 'Kanak Attak'" shows up throughout their writings, such as when they reject people and groups who tell them " who does not want to 'adapt' (read assimilate) into the open society has no business in enlightened Germany". Instead, Kanak Attak believes that there can be an enlightened Germany without erasing the cultures and backgrounds of the foreigners. The group believes that "the idea that the 'mixture of people' must somehow be regulated and controlled" is wrong as well, and instead feels that there should be no distinctions made on race at all.

Another contradiction that the anti-racist group faces is the fact that, despite their ties to the hip-hop generation and its struggles and beliefs, Kanak Attak takes special measures to distance itself from hip-hop. Feridun Zaimoğlu, the "spiritual leader" of the group uses the same language in his writing that is "spoken by the disenfranchised youth of the hip-hop generation". However, the group seems intent on destroying any preconceptions that the group is linked to hip-hop when they write that Kanak Attak "should not be seen as the 'cool voice' of the ghetto". Once again, Kanak Attak takes offense at this generalization that is offered up by the "commercial vultures of the cultural industries", just as it takes offense at any attempt to push cultural assimilation or mixing on the group and its members. Although there are a few contradictions in its doctrine, Kanak Attak represents the growing anti-racist movement in Germany among immigrants who want to be German but also wish to retain their own cultural heritage.

== Selected publications ==
- Kanak Sprak, 1995, ISBN 3-434-54518-2
- Abschaum. Novel, 1997, ISBN 3-434-54509-3 (2000 as film with the title Kanak Attak)
- Koppstoff, 1999, ISBN 3-88022-674-1
- Liebesmale, scharlachrot. Novel, 2000, ISBN 3-462-03097-3
- Kopf und Kragen. 2001, ISBN 3-596-15290-9
- German Amok. Novel, 2002, ISBN 3-596-15851-6
- Leinwand. Novel, 2003, ISBN 3-434-53080-0
- Twelve Grams of Happiness. Stories, 2004, ISBN 3-462-03362-X
- Leyla. Novel, 2006, ISBN 3-462-03696-3
- Rom intensiv, (short stories) Kiepenheuer & Witsch, Köln 2007, ISBN 978-3-462-03789-0
- Liebesbrand, Kiepenheuer & Witsch, Köln 2008, ISBN 978-3-462-03969-6
- Ferne Nähe, Tübinger Poetik-Dozentur, 2008, ISBN 978-3-89929-144-5 (With Ilija Trojanow).
- Hinterland, Kiepenheuer & Witsch, Köln 2009, ISBN 978-3-462-04133-0
- Ruß, Kiepenheuer & Witsch, Köln 2011, ISBN 978-3-462-04329-7
- Der Mietmaler: eine Liebesgeschichte, Langen Müller, München 2013, ISBN 978-3-7844-3324-0
- Isabel, Kiepenheuer & Witsch, Köln 2014, ISBN 978-3-462-04607-6
- Siebentürmeviertel, Kiepenheuer & Witsch, Köln 2015, ISBN 978-3-462-04764-6
- Evangelio, Kiepenheuer & Witsch, Köln 2017, ISBN 978-3-462-05010-3
- Ich gehe durch das Deutschland meiner Tage: 27 Erfahrungen in meinem Land, stories, Edition Eichthal 2018, ISBN 978-3-9817066-4-2
- Die Geschichte der Frau, Kiepenheuer & Witsch, Köln 2019, ISBN 978-3-462-05230-5
- Bewältigung, Kiepenheuer & Witsch, Köln 2022, ISBN 978-3-462-00348-2
- Durchdrungenheit, Texte und Gespräche, Königshausen & Neumann, Würzburg 2022, ISBN 978-3-8260-7713-5 (with Norbert Otto Eke).
- Sohn ohne Vater, Kiepenheuer & Witsch, Köln 2025, ISBN 978-3-462-00588-2

=== Plays written together with Günter Senkel ===
- Casino Leger, Premiered at Schauspiel Frankfurt 2003
- Ja. Tu es. Jetzt., Premiered at Junges Theater Bremen, 2003
- Halb so wild, Premiered at Theater Kiel, 2004
- Othello, nach Shakespeare, Premiered at Munich Kammerspiele, 2003
- Lulu Live, nach Wedekind, Premiered at Munich Kammerspiele, 2006
- Nathan Messias, Premiered at Düsseldorfer Schauspielhaus, 2006
- Schwarze Jungfrauen, Theater Hebbel am Ufer, Berlin, 2006
- Molière, Premiered at Salzburg Festival, Schaubühne am Lehniner Platz, 2007
- Romeo und Julia, nach Shakespeare, Premiered at Theater Kiel, 2006
- Schattenstimmen, Premiered at Schauspiel Köln, 2008
- Alpsegen, Premiered at Munich Kammerspiele, 2011
- Siegfrieds Erben, Premiered at Nibelung Festival, Worms, 2018
- Der Diplomat, Premiered at Nibelung Festival, Worms, 2024

== Awards and prizes ==
- 1997 Civis Media Prize
- 1998 Screen play Prize of Schleswig-Holstein/Germany
- 2002 Friedrich-Hebbel-Preis
- 2003 Prize of the Jury at the Ingeborg-Bachmann-Competition for his narrative Häute (skins)(Published in his volume Zwölf Gramm Glück)
- 2005 Adelbert von Chamisso Prize
- 2005 Villa Massimo, Rome – Scholarship
- 2005 Hugo Ball Prize of the City of Pirmasens
- 2007 Carl-Amery-Literaturpreis
- 2007 Grimmelshausen-Preis
- 2023 Brothers Grimm Poetics Professorship
- 2025 Walter Kempowski Preis für biografische Literatur
