= Peter Becker =

Peter Becker may refer to:

- Peter Becker (actor) (born 1979), Anglo-German actor
- Peter Becker (biologist) (born 1958), German molecular biologist
- Peter Becker (curler) (born 1949), New Zealand curler
- Peter Emil Becker (1908–2000), German neurologist
- Peter Becker (Friends), a fictional character in the American sitcom Friends
- Peter Becker (rower) (born 1956), West German rower
- Peter Becker, president of the Criterion Collection, an American video-distribution company

== See also ==
- Peter Beckers (1947–1996), Scottish professional footballer
