= Peter Becker (actor) =

Anglo-German actor (born 1979)

Peter Becker is an Anglo-German actor. He was born in 1979 in Bad Hersfeld to a German father and a British mother and was raised between Germany and the UK. Becker had his first role as a theatre actor at 15 years old at the renowned Bad Hersfelder Festspiele.

At the same time as he was building his acting career, Becker was simultaneously involved in journalism, rising to editor of the Hersfelder Zeitung newspaper’s weekly youth page.

After completing his formal education, Becker moved to Berlin, where he became a production assistant and casting director for commercials and music videos.

In 2002 he began studying at the prestigious Ernst Busch Academy of Dramatic Arts. During this time he was recruited for his first film roles (‘The Loss Of The Pamir’), and further theatre engagements including Deutsches Theater (Berlin) and Thalia Theater (Hamburg). The short film ‘Es Geht Uns Gut’ by Thomas Stuber, on which he worked both as lead actor as well as co-author, won the Advancement Award of the Film Industry of Baden-Wuerttemberg in 2006 and received the title “valuable” by the Film Review Board Wiesbaden in 2007. In addition to working in front of the camera (including 'Unknown (2011 film)', 'Babylon Berlin', '13 Minutes', 'Mission To Murder Hitler' and 'Bad Banks') he is regularly performing on stage.

From 2006 to 2007, Becker became part of the ensemble at Volkstheater, Vienna where he met director Nuran David Calis, with whom he collaborated again in 2008 at Schauspiel Köln in Cologne.

In 2009, he returned to Berlin where he has since been involved in numerous productions at Ballhaus Naunynstrasse, Heimathafen Neukölln, HAU, Ballhaus Ost and Maxim Gorki Theater.

In 2015 he played 'Giselher of Burgundy' at the Nibelung Festival, Worms and in 2017 he was cast as 'Friedrich Müller' in the highly acclaimed UK tour of 'War Horse (play)' that’s announced to be extended for a run at the Royal National Theatre to commemorate the 100th anniversary of the end of World War I in November 2018.

Besides acting, Becker works as a voice-over artist for clients including major German TV and radio stations such as Deutschlandfunk Kultur, Arte, ARD (broadcaster) and ZDF. He is also known for his portrayal of 'The Joker (character)' in the German version of Lego Batman 2: DC Super Heroes and Lego Batman 3: Beyond Gotham.

== Filmography ==
Film / TV roles
Year	Title	Role	Notes and awards
2005	The Loss of the Pamir (Der Untergang der Pamir)	Bernd 'Stummel' Ahlers	
2006	Es geht uns gut	Daniel Liedel	Advancement Award of the film industry of Baden-Wuerttemberg; Title ‘Valuable’ by the Film Review Board Wiesbaden
2006	Im Namen des Gesetzes – Kinderlos	Mark	
2007	Unschuldig – Chaostage		
2007	Far Too Close	David	
2007	Headshots	Jan	
2008	Mission to Murder Hitler (Stauffenberg – Die wahre Geschichte)	Graf Schenk Claus von Stauffenberg	
2008	Vulkan	Patrick	
2008	Haus und Kind	Doctor	Television Award of the German Academy of Performing Arts
2008	Liebe deinen Feind	Corporal Marc Fletcher	
2009	Der Mann der über Autos sprang	Policeman	Best Film at the Festival du Film d‘Aubagne
2009	A gURLs wURLd (Emmas Chatroom)	Officer Warnke	
2009	Until Nothing Remains (Bis nichts mehr bleibt)	Lenny	
2010	Unknown	Hotel Guard	
2010	Fluss	Jörg	
2010	Das Geschenk	Old Shatterhand	Advancement Award at the International Short Film Festival Dresden; Nomination for the Max Ophüls Award in the competition category ‘short film’
2011	Alles Klara – Mord nach Stundenplan	Marc Höhne	
2012	Polizeiruf 110 – Eine andere Welt	Brandt	
2012	Tatort – Schwarze Tiger, Weisse Löwen	Sikter	
2012	Frau Ella	Patrice	
2013	Dr. Gressmann zeigt Gefühle	Steve	
2014	13 Minutes (Elser – Er hätte die Welt verändert)	Lux	
2014	Polizeiruf 110 – Eine mörderische Idee	Sautter	
2014	Stuttgart Homicide – Chain Reaction (SOKO Stuttgart – Kettenreaktion)	Timo Münster	
2015	SOKO Wismar – Tödliche Diagnose	Matthias Harthoff	
2015	Immigration Game	Paul	
2016	Ein starkes Team – Nathalie	Maximilian Förster (Arzt)	
2016	Alarm für Cobra 11 – Die Autobahnpolizei – Phantom Code	Kiesling	
2016	Babylon Berlin	Kapo Heinrich	Deutscher Fernsehpreis for Best Series; Premios Ondas for International Television: Best Series; Romy (TV award) for TV Event Of The Year; Seoul International Drama Awards, Grand Prize; Shanghai International TV Festival for Best Foreign TV Series; Bavarian TV Awards, Special Award; Bambi Award for TV National; Grimme-Preis for Best Fiction; European Film Awards for European Achievement in Fiction Series
2016	Bad Banks – The Lion's Den	Matthias Wegener	Deutscher Fernsehpreis for Best Series
2017	Der Zürich Krimi – Borchert und die letzte Hoffnung	Coroner	
2019	Notruf Hafenkante – Pokerprinzessin	Paul Anton	
2019	Letzte Spur Berlin – Amöbenliebe	Christoph Fahrenholz	
2019	Blutige Anfänger	Roger Hahnemann	

== Selected stage credits ==
- Friedrich Müller, War Horse (play), Royal National Theatre, UK Tour, 2017–2018
- Bailiff, Geheimdienste vor Gericht – Eine Volksbeschwerde, Maxim Gorki Theater, Berlin, 2016
- Mike, And Then We Took Berlin, Ballhaus Ost, Berlin, 2016–2017
- Giselher, Gemetzel, Nibelung Festival, Worms, 2015
- Ghassan, Could You Please Look Into The Camera!, Heimathafen Neukölln, Berlin, 2013–2014
- Isaac, Abraham And The Butchers, Ballhaus Naunynstrasse, Berlin, 2012–2013
- Ernst-Theodor Vorm Walde, Endstation Ewige Heimat, Heimathafen Neukölln, Berlin, 2011
- Foreign Worker, Lö Bal Almanya, Ballhaus Naunynstrasse, Berlin 2011–2013
- Emil, Waiting For Adam Spielman, Ballhaus Naunynstrasse, Berlin, 2010–2012
- Journalist, Die Schwäne Vom Schlachthof, Ballhaus Naunynstrasse, Berlin
- Karsten, Man Braucht Keinen Reiseführer Für Ein Dorf, Das Man Sieht, Hebbel am Ufer, Berlin, 2009
- Lepidus, Caligula, Deutsches Theater (Berlin), 2009
- Toni, Stunde Null Vol. I – III, Schauspiel Köln, Cologne, 2008
- Martius, Anatomy Titus: Fall of Rome, Grillo-Theater, Essen 2008
- Malcolm, Macbeth, Volkstheater, Vienna, 2006–2007
- Paul Danziger, On the Shore of the Wide World, Volkstheater, Vienna, 2006–2007
- Ernst Ludwig, Cabaret, Volkstheater, Vienna, 2006–2007
- Cyril, Yvonne, Princess Of Burgundy, Volkstheater, Vienna, 2006
- Bill, Dogville', Volkstheater, Vienna, 2006
- Percy 'Hotspur', Henry IV, Part 1', BAT, Berlin, 2005
- Ismael, Cold, Deutsches Theater (Berlin), 2004–2006
- diverse productions, Bad Hersfelder Festspiele, 1995–1998
