= Käthe Hannemann =

German theatre actress

Käthe Hannemann, also Käthchen Hannemann, (31 May 1881 in West Prussia – after 1935) was a German stage actress.

== Life ==
Hannemann, the daughter of Emil Hannemann (died 1904), the long-time director of the Tilsit City Theatre, and his wife Ludmilla, already appeared on stage in children's roles at the age of twelve. But her actual career only began in 1897, also in Tilsit. There she stayed till 1900 and then she went to Cologne where she was successful in the profession of the youthful lovers and naive. Afterwards she worked successfully in Berlin. Her brother was the actor Karl Hannemann (1895-1953), who appeared in the circle of Else Lasker-Schüler. About 1902 she changed to the Deutsche Volkstheater in Vienna, and ten years later to Berlin.

She was a graceful actress, natural, fresh, convincing and confident. Among her repertoire were the roles "Haubenlerche", "Trude" in Johannisfeuer by Hermann Sudermann, "Trude" in Probekandidat by Max Dreyer, "Gisa Holm" etc.
