= The Italian Connection =

1972 poliziottesco film directed by Fernando Di Leo

- Italian film poster
- Italian: La mala ordina
- Directed by: Fernando Di Leo
- Screenplay by: Fernando Di Leo; Augusto Finocchi; Ingo Hermes
- Story by: Fernando Di Leo
- Based on: Milano calibro 9 by Giorgio Scerbanenco (uncredited)
- Produced by: Armando Novelli
- Starring: Mario Adorf; Henry Silva; Woody Strode; Adolfo Celi; Luciana Paluzzi; Franco Fabrizi; Femi Benussi; Gianni Macchia; Francesca Romana Coluzzi; Cyril Cusack; Sylva Koscina
- Cinematography: Franco Villa
- Edited by: Amedeo Giomini
- Music by: Armando Trovajoli
- Production companies: Cineproduzioni Daunia 70; Hermes Synchron
- Distributed by: Alpherat (Italy); Constantin Film (West Germany)
- Release dates: 2 September 1972 (Italy); 1 December 1972 (West Germany)
- Running time: 100 minutes
- Countries: Italy; West Germany
- Box office: ₤852.404 million ( Italy)

The Italian Connection (Italian: La mala ordina, lit. 'The mob orders', also released as Manhunt in the City and Manhunt in Milan) is a 1972 poliziottesco film directed and co-written by Fernando Di Leo; starring Mario Adorf, Henry Silva, Woody Strode, Adolfo Celi, Luciana Paluzzi, Francesca Romana Coluzzi, Sylva Koscina, and Cyril Cusack.

The film is the second part of Di Leo's “Milieu trilogy”, preceded by Caliber 9 (also 1972) and followed by The Boss (1973). It was released to Italian theatres on September 2, 1972.

== Plot ==
Hitmen Dave Catania and Frank Webster are dispatched from New York to Milan to find and kill Luca Canali, a small-time pimp accused of stealing a mob heroin shipment. Local mafia Don Vito Tressoldi is upset by the Americans intrusion on his turf, but is forced to play along by seeking to collect Canali for them. Don Vito's city-wide network of informants, including Canali's own friends, try to find him, but he manages repeatedly to narrowly evade them.

It transpires that Don Vito actually stole the shipment himself and framed Canali. He resorts to having Canali's wife and daughter killed to draw him out. Enraged, Canali goes on a violent rampage of revenge against the mob, picking off the members of Don Vito's gang and eventually killing the boss himself in his own office.

Canali leads Catania and Webster to a final confrontation in a wrecking yard, where he manages to kill them both but is severely wounded in the process. Exhausted, Canali collapses, leaving it ambiguous whether he survives or not.

== Cast ==
- Mario Adorf as Luca Canali
- Henry Silva as Dave Catania
- Woody Strode as Frank Webster
- Adolfo Celi as Don Vito Tressoldi
- Luciana Paluzzi as Eva Lalli
- Francesca Romana Coluzzi as Trini
- Cyril Cusack as Corso
- Femi Benussi as Nana
- Franco Fabrizi as Enrico Moroni
- Peter Berling as Damiano
- Gianni Macchia as Niccolo
- Sylva Koscina as Lucia Canali
- Lara Wendel as Rita Canali
- Jessica Dublin as Miss Kenneth
- Giuseppe Castellano as Garagaz
- Andrea Scotti as Garo
- Ulli Lommel as Marc
- Renato Zero as Barfly

== Production ==
Di Leo's original title for The Italian Connection was Ordini da un altro mondo (Orders From Another World). The film's premise is taken from the short story "Milan by Calibro 9" by Giorgio Scerbanenco, which had appeared in the book Milano calibro 9, the inspiration for di Leo's earlier film of the same name; unlike the previous film, Scerbanenco did not receive an onscreen credit.

The film was shot on-location in Milan, and at Rome's Dear Studios. Mario Adorf performed his own stunts in the infamous car chase scene. In contrast to Caliber 9, Adorf also did his own dubbing for the English-language version.

Actors Adolfo Celi and Luciana Paluzzi had previously appeared together in the James Bond film Thunderball (1965).

== Release ==
The Italian Connection was released theatrically in Italy on 2 September 1972 where it was distributed by Alpherat. The film grossed 852.404 million Italian lira on its theatrical run in Italy. It was released in West Germany on 1 December 1972 under the title Der Mafiaboss - Sie töten wie Schakale.

The film received a release in the United States as The Italian Connection in 1973 with an 87-minute running time. Various home video releases over the years retitled the film as Hired to Kill, Black Kingpin, Hitmen, and Hit Men.

The film was released by Raro Video on DVD and Blu-ray in the United States.

== Legacy ==
Quentin Tarantino, a self-avowed fan of Di Leo's films, cited the characters of Dave and Frank as the inspirations for Vincent Vega (John Travolta) and Jules Winfield (Samuel L. Jackson) in Pulp Fiction.
