= Schwarz Rot Gold =

- Created by: Dieter Meichsner
- Starring: Uwe Friedrichsen
- Country of origin: Germany

Schwarz-Rot-Gold is a German television series.

== List of episodes ==
#	Title	Original airdate	Director	Starring
1	"Unser Land"	12 May 1982	Dieter Wedel	Peter Fitz, Susanne Uhlen
2	"Alles in Butter"	3 November 1982	Dieter Wedel	Hannelore Elsner
3	"Kaltes Fleisch"	1 December 1982	Marco Serafini	Günter Strack
4	"Blauer Dunst"	28 November 1984	Theo Mezger	Christiane Krüger
5	"Um Knopf und Kragen"	23 December 1984	Marco Serafini	Barbara Rütting
6	"Nicht schießen!"	27 March 1985	Dieter Wedel	Thekla Carola Wied
7	"Schwarzer Kaffee"	20 January 1988	Theo Mezger	Peter Pasetti, Ingmar Zeisberg
8	"Zucker Zucker"	3 February 1988	Marco Serafini	Ivan Desny, Pinkas Braun, Peter Kern, Herbert Fux
9	"Wiener Blut"	4 February 1990	Pete Ariel	
10	"Hammelsprung"	22 August 1990	Theo Mezger	
11	"Schmutziges Gold"	18 September 1991	Theo Mezger	Hannelore Elsner
12	"Stoff"	9 November 1991	Theo Mezger	Jan Fedder
13	"Der Rubel rollt"	14 February 1993	Theo Mezger	
14	"Made in Germany"	1 September 1993	Theo Mezger	
15	"Mafia Polska"	25 December 1993	Theo Mezger	
16	"Mission in Hong Kong"	23 November 1994	Theo Mezger	
17	"Geld stinkt"	15 March 1995	Theo Mezger	
18	"Im Sumpf"	17 July 1996	Theo Mezger	Gerhard Olschewski, Michael Gwisdek

== See also ==
- List of German television series
