= Nibelung Festival, Worms =

Theatre festival in Germany

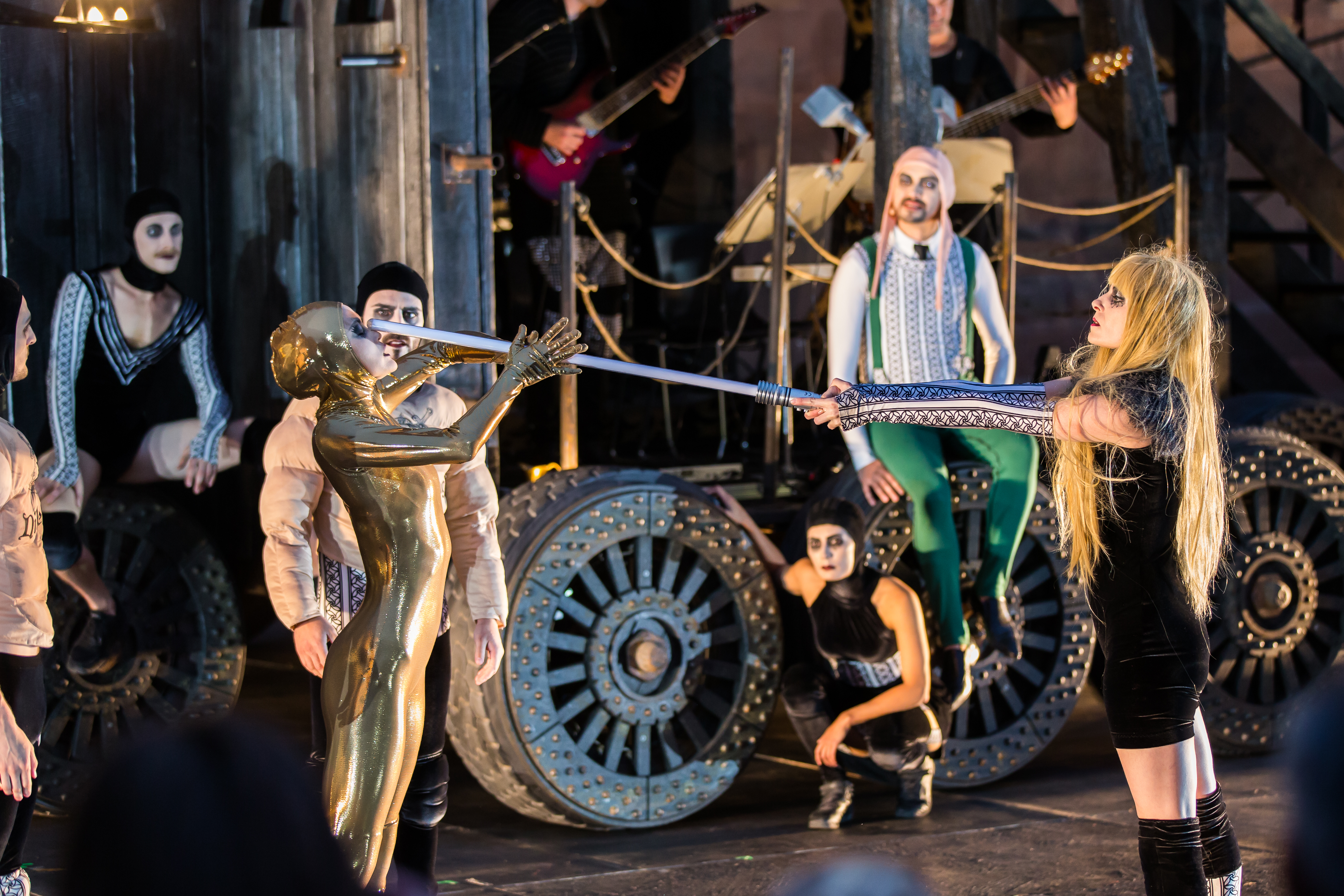
Nibelungenfestspiele 2015

Nibelungenfestspiele Worms is a theatre festival in Worms, Rheinland-Pfalz, Germany.

The festival takes place every year since its re-establishment in 2002, usually in July or August as part of the Kultursommer Rheinland-Pfalz. The performance venue is an open-air stage directly in front of Worms Cathedral (Wormser Dom). From 2003 to 2014, artistic director of the festival was Dieter Wedel. Since 2015, producer Nico Hofmann has been the director.

== History ==
The festival was established during the Third Reich in 1937. Between 1937 and 1939 the repertoire was based exclusively on Christian Friedrich Hebbel's 1861 three-part drama Die Nibelungen. The festival was revived in 1956 was without lasting success.

In 2002 the first new production of the Nibelungen Festival took place in order to re-establish Worms as a festival city. Theater and movie stars like Dieter Wedel, Mario Adorf and Maria Schrader were hired to cause a stir throughout Germany. Produced by Moritz Rinke, the first festival took place on the south portal of the Worms Cathedral. In the summer of 2010, for financial reasons, an improvised version of the festival titled Devil, God and Emperor - Improvisations on the Time in which the Nibelungenlied Arose was played on a smaller scale at the "Platz der Partnerschaft", incorporating the ambience near the Cathedral. In 2011 the Nibelung Festival celebrated its 10th anniversary with a big open-air performance in front of the Cathedral; in the process, the producer and director departed from the original material of the Nibelungen for the first time. The production was titled Joseph Süß Oppenheimer, called Jud Süß.

Since 2018, the city of Worms and the Nibelungen Festival have awarded the Mario Adorf Prize, named after Mario Adorf. It is awarded to actors, stage designers, directors or other members of the Nibelungen Festival who have distinguished themselves through exceptional artistic achievement. Adorf himself is a member of the Festival's Board of Trustees and sits on the jury. Among other things, he initiated the festival in 2002 and participated himself as an actor in 2002 and 2003. The prize is a glass stele with a dragon motif by the illustrator Hendrik Dorgathen, and it is also endowed with 10,000 euros.
