= Philipp Kadelbach =

German film director

Philipp Kadelbach (born 9 September 1974, Frankfurt am Main) is a German film and television director. In discussing Kadelbach, actor Jürgen Schornagel stated "He's in the top five of the 116 directors I've worked with. He helps young people and experienced actors - and he lets us make mistakes".

== Career ==
Philipp Kadelbach attended the Pittsburgh Filmmakers' School of Film, Photography, and Digital Media and at the same time worked for the German local television channel WQED. From 1995 onwards he worked as the head of Avid Digital Editing at Neue Sentimental Film, a Frankfurt advertising agency, followed by the Film Academy Baden-Württemberg in Ludwigsburg.

His directing debut was the short film Platonische Liebe (FBW-Prädikat: Wertvoll) in 1998/99, for which he was also screenwriter and film editor. Its music is by his younger brother, the film composer Michael Kadelbach and Herbert Grönemeyer. It won the Friedrich-Wilhelm-Murnau-Kurzfilmpreis 2000. It also appeared at the 1999 Telluride Film Festival (under the title Platonic Love), the 1999 Turin Film Festival, the Berlinale 2000 and on the Arte channel. Kadelbach's next short film was the 2001/02 2 Fläschchen.

He has directed over 300 national and international adverts for BMW, VW, Mercedes, Hornbach, Burger King, Chevrolet, SEAT, Siemens, T-Mobile - when he and his cameraman Thomas Dirnhofer make advertising films, they use the joint pseudonym Begbie.

He produced the crime series Unschuldig for teamWorx, also directing the first four episodes. His first TV film was the ZDF two-parter Das Geheimnis der Wale with Christopher Lambert, Mario Adorf and Veronica Ferres. In the second half of 2009 he filmed Hindenburg: The Last Flight for teamWorx and RTL, covering the Hindenburg disaster and starring Max Simonischek, Lauren Lee Smith, Heiner Lauterbach, Greta Scacchi, Stacy Keach, Ulrich Noethen, Christiane Paul, Hannes Jaenicke and Wotan Wilke Möhring. Hindenburg: The Last Flight won the Deutscher Fernsehpreis 2011 for best series.

In March 2011 shooting began on Unsere Mütter, unsere Väter (released in the UK as Generation War), a three-parter for ZDF. Kadelbach replaced Lars Becker as its director partway through filming and the film won the Deutscher Fernsehpreis 2013 for best series, the Goldene Kamera 2014 for best TV film and the 2004 International Emmy Award 2014. In June 2015 he began shooting SS-GB, a five-part adaptation of the novel of the same title by Len Deighton by BBC Films - this premiered in February 2017 on BBC One and made him the first German director of a BBC Films series made exclusively for UK release.

== Filmography ==
- 1999: Platonische Liebe (short film)
- 2004: Unschuldig (TV series, 4 episodes)
- 2010: Das Geheimnis der Wale (TV film)
- 2011: Hindenburg: The Last Flight (TV film)
- 2013: Generation War (Unsere Mütter, unsere Väter, TV miniseries)
- 2014: Die Pilgerin (TV film)
- 2015: Naked Among Wolves (Nackt unter Wölfen, TV film)
- 2016: Point Blank (TV film)
- 2017: SS-GB (TV miniseries)
- 2017: Riviera (TV series, 2 episodes)
- 2018: So viel Zeit
- 2018: Perfume (Parfum, TV miniseries)

== Awards ==
- 2007: VDW Award, Starke Kinder, commercial for Deutscher Caritasverband
