= Mario Adorf =

German actor and writer (1930–2026)

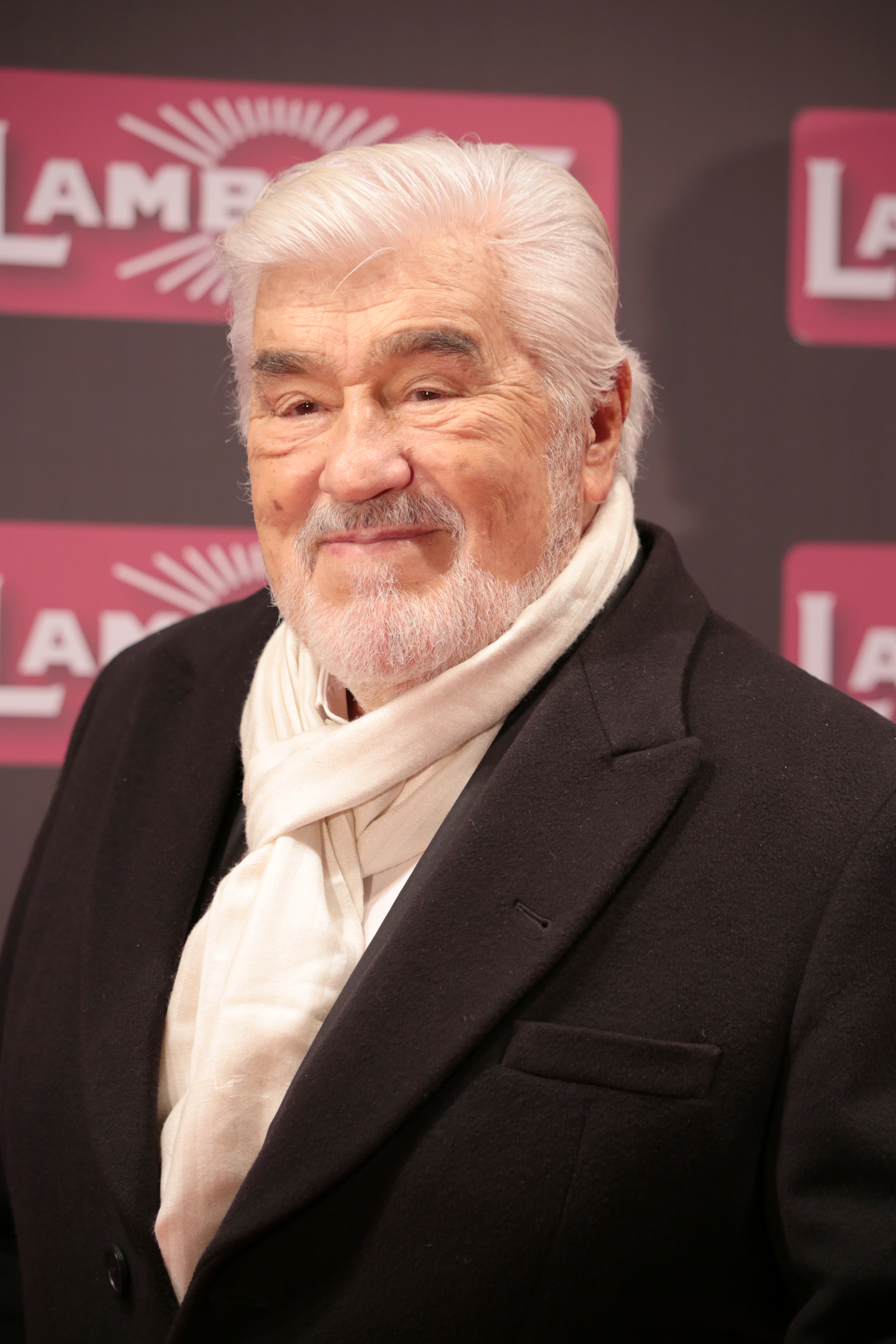
- Adorf in 2018
- Born: 8 September 1930; Zurich, Switzerland
- Died: 8 April 2026 (aged 95); Paris, France
- Education: University of Mainz (withdrew); Otto Falckenberg School of the Performing Arts
- Occupations: Actor; writer
- Years active: 1954–2023
- Spouses: Lis Verhoeven (m. 1962–1964) Monique Faye Adorf (m. 1985)
- Children: 1

Signature
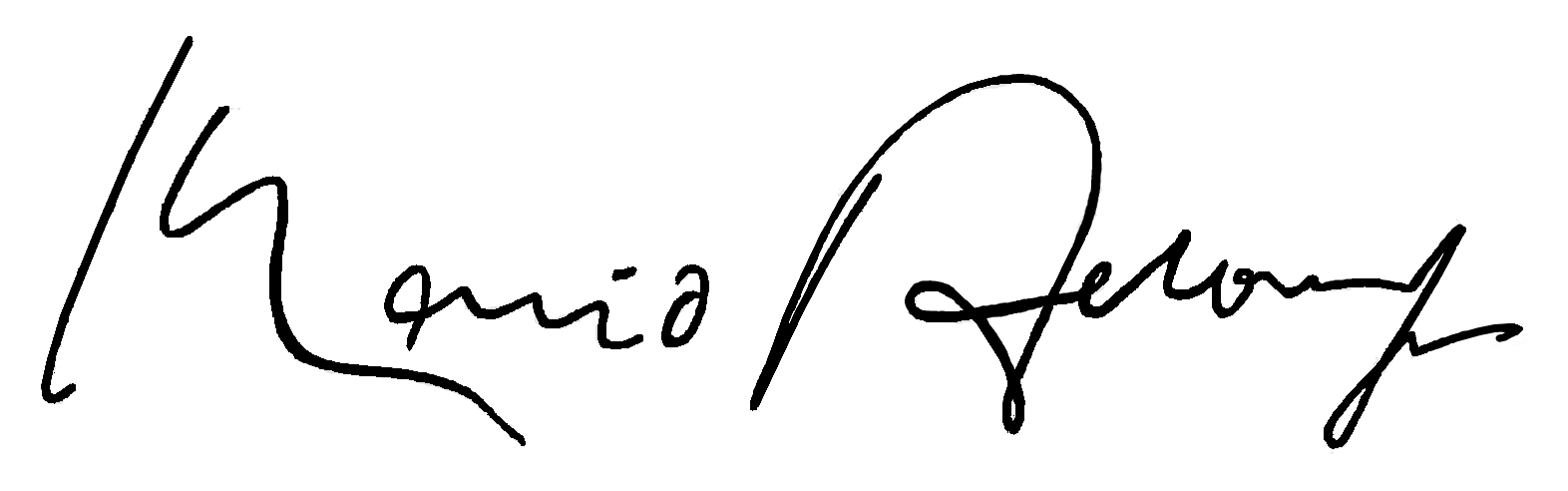

Mario Adorf (German: [ˈmaː.ʁio ˈaː.dɔʁf]; 8 September 1930 – 8 April 2026) was a German actor, considered to be one of the great veteran character actors of European cinema. In his native country, he was one of the leading film and television stars for decades, winning two German Film Awards for acting and an Honorary Award for Outstanding Contributions to German Cinema.

From 1954 to 2023, he appeared in both leading and supporting roles in over 200 film and television productions, ranging from euro westerns and crime thrillers to the 1979 Oscar-winning film The Tin Drum. Adorf worked with noted directors such as Volker Schlöndorff, Rainer Werner Fassbinder, Billy Wilder, Robert Siodmak, Sam Peckinpah, Sergio Corbucci, and Claude Chabrol. He was the author of several successful, mostly autobiographical books.

== Early life and education ==
Adorf was born on 8 September 1930 in Zurich, Switzerland, the illegitimate child of Matteo Menniti, an Italian surgeon from Calabria, and Alice Adorf, a German medical assistant. He grew up in his maternal grandfather's hometown, Mayen, where he was initially raised by his unmarried mother. After three years, he was sent to set to a Catholic orphanage run by the Sisters of Mercy of St. Charles Borromeo, where he remained until the outbreak of World War II and the closure of the institution. During the war, he was a member of the Hitler Youth and was conscripted into the Volkssturm in early 1945.

Adorf enrolled in the University of Mainz to study criminology, taking jobs as an ironworker at a Schott AG plant to finance his studies. He was a member of the University's boxing team and had his first acting experiences in the drama club. This taste of the thespian life led him to discontinue his studies and pursue acting fulltime, working backstage at the Schauspielhaus Zürich before enrolling at the Otto Falckenberg School of the Performing Arts in Munich. After graduating, he joined the repertory company of the Munich Kammerspiele.

== Career ==
His breakthrough came in 1957 with the lead role of the alleged murderer Bruno Lüdke in Robert Siodmak's film The Devil Strikes at Night, which was nominated for an Academy Award for Best Foreign Language Film. He gained fame in Europe, and particularly Germany, and also made appearances in international films, including the 1965 version of Ten Little Indians and Smilla's Sense of Snow in 1997.

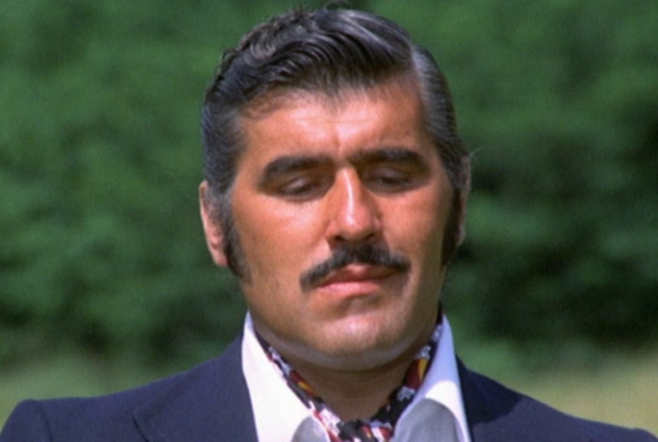
Adorf in The Italian Connection (1972)

Adorf played a wide variety of roles but was best known for his portrayals of villains who could be charismatic or relatable to the audience. He noted in an interview, "the villain is the [most] interesting role.... I don’t love the villains as people, as characters, but I know their significance, so I’m happy to lend them my body, my face." During the 1960s, he appeared in several Karl May film adaptations and Spaghetti Westerns. He also appeared in a number of other Italian productions, including poliziotteschi films such as Caliber 9 and The Italian Connection (both 1972), and the fourth season of the popular RAI crime drama La piovra (1989). For the BBC, Adorf played the title character in The Little World of Don Camillo in 1981, and also a small role in the 1982 serial adaptation of John le Carré's Smiley's People as a German club owner.

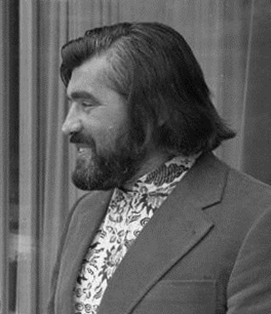
Adorf in 1971

During New German Cinema, he worked with Volker Schlöndorff on The Lost Honour of Katharina Blum (1975) and The Tin Drum (1979). In the latter film, which won the Academy Award for Best Foreign Language Film, he portrayed the role of family father Alfred Matzerath. In 1981, he played the role of Schukert in Rainer Werner Fassbinder's Lola (1981).

Adorf was very successful with his starring roles in a number of German TV miniseries directed by Dieter Wedel, including Der große Bellheim (1992), Der Schattenmann (1995), and Die Affäre Semmeling (2002). Also popular was his portrayal of an adhesive manufacturer in Helmut Dietl's satirical TV show Kir Royal – Aus dem Leben eines Klatschreporters (1985).

He expressed regret that he declined roles in Billy Wilder's One, Two, Three (1961) and Francis Ford Coppola's The Godfather (1972). He later worked with Wilder on Fedora (1978), portraying a hotel manager. Adorf also turned down the role of General Mapache in Sam Peckinpah's The Wild Bunch (1969) because he felt the character was too violent. He had previously appeared in Peckinpah's Major Dundee (1965) as a Union Army sergeant alongside Charlton Heston.

Adorf also occasionally worked as a voice actor. In 1996, he provided the German dubbing voice for the character Draco in Dragonheart, a role performed by Sean Connery.

His final film role was 2023's Real Fight, directed by Ahmet Tas.

== Personal life ==
In the 1960s, he married Lis Verhoeven. The couple had a child, Stella; they divorced later. In 1985, he married Monique Faye, after being introduced to each other by their mutual friend Brigitte Bardot. The couple had residences in Paris, Munich and Saint-Tropez.

Adorf expressed close ties to his Southern Italian heritage, and was a frequent traveler there, in addition to his prolific work in the country. For many years, he maintained a residence in Rome, saying "That was, of course, that 'la dolce vita' era, both in terms of life itself, a very easy life where one could live very well, even with little money. A very cheerful time, too."

=== Death ===
Adorf died in Paris on 8 April 2026 after a short illness, at the age of 95.

== Awards and honors ==
Among many others:

- 2000 Bavarian Film Awards Honorary Award
- 2001 Mayen, honorary citizenship
- 2011 Best Human Brand Award
- 2024 Deutscher Fernsehpreis: Ehrenpreis der Stifter

== Selected filmography ==
Sources:

- 08/15 (1954), as Wagner
- 08/15 at Home (1955), as Unteroffizier Stamm
- Fruit in the Neighbour's Garden (1956), as Landstreicher
- The Girl and the Legend (1957), as Bertie
- Sand, Love and Salt (1957, directed by František Čáp), as Coco
- Vater, unser bestes Stück (1957)
- The Devil Strikes at Night (1957, directed by Robert Siodmak), as Bruno Luedke
- The Doctor of Stalingrad (1958, directed by Géza von Radványi), as Pelz, Sanitäter
- Rosemary (1958, directed by Rolf Thiele), as Horst
- The Death Ship (1959, directed by Georg Tressler), as Lawski, Polnischer Kohlenschlepper
- The Day the Rains Came (1959, directed by Gerd Oswald), as Werner Maurer
- Boomerang (1960, directed by Alfred Weidenmann), as Georg Kugler
- My Schoolfriend (1960), as Niedermoser
- Brainwashed (1960, directed by Gerd Oswald), as Mirko Centowic
- Who Are You, Mr. Sorge? (1961), as Max Klausen
- The Taste of Violence (1961), as Chamaco
- On the Tiger's Back (1961, directed by Luigi Comencini), as Mario Tagliabue
- Lulu (1962, directed by Rolf Thiele), as Rodrigo Quast
- Freddy and the Song of the South Pacific (1962), as Cameo during brawl at harbour pub (uncredited)
- The Last Charge (1962), as Nardone
- Street of Temptation (1962), as Joe
- Station Six-Sahara (1963, directed by Seth Holt), as Santos
- The Endless Night (1963), as Juanitas Bekannter
- Moral 63 (1963), as Axel Rottmann, Reporter
- 12 Angry Men (1963, TV film), as Juror 7
- Apache Gold (1963, directed by Harald Reinl), as Frederick Santer
- La visita (1963, directed by Antonio Pietrangeli), as Cucaracha
- A Mission for Mr. Dodd (1964), as Buddy Herman
- The Last Ride to Santa Cruz (1964, directed by Rolf Olsen), as Pedro Ortiz
- Massacre at Marble City (1964, directed by Paul Martin), as Matt Ellis
- Major Dundee (1965, directed by Sam Peckinpah), as Sgt. Gomez
- The Dirty Game (1965, directed by Terence Young, Christian-Jaque, Carlo Lizzani, Werner Klingler), as Callaghan
- The Camp Followers (1965, directed by Valerio Zurlini), as Sergeant Castagnoli
- That Man in Istanbul (1965, directed by Antonio Isasi-Isasmendi), as Bill
- The Gentlemen (1965, directed by Rolf Thiele, Alfred Weidenmann, Franz Seitz), as Verleger Blech – episode 'Die Intellektuellen'
- Ten Little Indians (1965, directed by George Pollock), as Herr Grohmann
- Sunscorched (1965), as Abel Dragna
- I Knew Her Well (1965, directed by Antonio Pietrangeli), as Emilio Ricci, aka Bietolone
- Honour Among Thieves (1966, directed by Wolfgang Staudte), as Orje
- The Treasure of San Gennaro (1966, directed by Dino Risi), as Sciascillo
- A Rose for Everyone (1967, directed by Franco Rossi), as Paolo
- Zärtliche Haie (1967, directed by Michel Deville), as Spion SB 3
- Ghosts – Italian Style (1967, directed by Renato Castellani), as Alfredo Mariano
- Anyone Can Play (1967, directed by Luigi Zampa), as Traffic cop
- A Sky Full of Stars for a Roof (1968, directed by Giulio Petroni), as Harry
- Up the Establishment (1969, directed by Michael Verhoeven), as Augustin 'Gustl' Wohlfahrt
- Gli specialisti (1969, directed by Sergio Corbucci), as El Diablo
- The Red Tent (1969, directed by Mikhail Kalatozov), as Biagi
- Cran d'arrêt (1970), as Le sadique aux cheveux longs
- The Bird with the Crystal Plumage (1970, directed by Dario Argento), as Berto Consalvi
- Gentlemen in White Vests (1970, directed by Wolfgang Staudte), as Bruno 'Dandy' Stiegler
- Deadlock (1970, directed by Roland Klick), as Charles Dump
- Long Live Robin Hood (1971), as Brother Tuck
- Million Dollar Eel (1971), as Nane Mora – the Guardiapesca
- Short Night of Glass Dolls (1971, directed by Aldo Lado), as Jacques Versain
- The Sicilian Checkmate (1972, directed by Florestano Vancini), as Amedeo Barrese
- Caliber 9 (1972, directed by Fernando Di Leo), as Rocco Musco
- When Women Lost Their Tails (1972), as Pap
- Execution Squad (1972, directed by Steno), as District Attorney Ricciuti
- King, Queen, Knave (1972, directed by Jerzy Skolimowski), as Prof. Ritter
- The Italian Connection (La mala ordina) (1972, directed by Fernando Di Leo), as Luca Canali
- The Adventures of Pinocchio (1972, TV miniseries, directed by Luigi Comencini), as Circus Director
- Sans sommation (1973, directed by Bruno Gantillon), as L'ex-commandant Pierre Capra
- The Assassination of Matteotti (1973, directed by Florestano Vancini), as Benito Mussolini
- Trip to Vienna (1973, directed by Edgar Reitz), as Fred Scheuermann – Ortsgruppenleiter
- Brigitte, Laura, Ursula, Monica, Raquel, Litz, Florinda, Barbara, Claudia, e Sofia le chiamo tutte... anima mia (1974), as Il commissario Marzoli
- What Have They Done to Your Daughters? (1974, directed by Massimo Dallamano), as Insp. Valentini
- Processo per direttissima (1974, directed by Lucio De Caro), as Procuratore Benedikter
- Weak Spot (1975, directed by Peter Fleischmann), as Manager
- The Lost Honour of Katharina Blum (1975, directed by Volker Schlöndorff), as Kommissar Beizmenne
- MitGift (1976, directed by Michael Verhoeven), as Edgar Burgmann
- Dog's Heart (1976, directed by Alberto Lattuada), as Bormenthàl
- Bomber & Paganini (1976), as Bomber
- Scrounged Meals (1977), as Police Officer Erwin
- I Am Afraid (1977, directed by Damiano Damiani), as Judge Moser
- Death or Freedom (1977, directed by Wolf Gremm), as Max
- The Main Actor (1977, directed by Reinhard Hauff), as Schikowski – der Vater
- Difficile morire (1977)
- Good-for-Nothing (1978), as Drunken Poet
- Germany in Autumn (1978, directed by Volker Schlöndorff, Rainer Werner Fassbinder), as Member of the board of TV producers
- Fedora (1978, directed by Billy Wilder), as Hotel Manager
- The Tin Drum (1979, directed by Volker Schlöndorff), as Alfred Matzerath
- Milo Milo (1979), as Thanasis
- L'Empreinte des géants (1980), as Meru
- The Little World of Don Camillo (1981, TV miniseries, directed by Peter Hammond), as Don Camillo
- La disubbidienza (1981, directed by Aldo Lado), as Mr. Manzi
- Lola (1981, directed by Rainer Werner Fassbinder), as Schuckert
- Invitation au voyage (1982, directed by Peter Del Monte), as Timour
- Smiley's People (1982, TV miniseries, directed by Simon Langton), as Claus Kretzschmar
- La côte d'amour (1982), as Louis Zannella
- Marco Polo (1982–1983, TV miniseries, directed by Giuliano Montaldo), as Giovanni
- State buoni se potete (1983, directed by Luigi Magni), as Pope Sixtus V
- Klassenverhältnisse (1984, directed by Straub-Huillet), as Karl Roßmann's Uncle
- Coconuts (1985), as Siemann
- Mary Ward (1985), as Pope Urban VIII
- The Holcroft Covenant (1985, directed by John Frankenheimer), as Erich Kessler / Jürgen Mass
- Via Mala (1985, TV miniseries, directed by Tom Toelle), as Jonas Lauretz
- Momo (1986, directed by Johannes Schaaf), as Nicola
- La ragazza dei lillà (1986), as Albert
- Kir Royal (1986, TV series, 1 episode, directed by Helmut Dietl), as Generaldirektor Heinrich 'Heini' Haffenloher
- Mino (1986, TV miniseries, directed by Gianfranco Albano), as Maggiore Lupo
- Devil's Paradise (1987, directed by Vadim Glowna), as Schomberg
- The Second Victory (1987, directed by Gerald Thomas), as Dr. Sepp Kunzli
- Italian Night (1987, directed by Carlo Mazzacurati), as Alvise Tornov
- Vado a riprendermi il gatto (1987, directed by Giuliano Biagetti)
- Heimatmuseum (1988, TV miniseries, directed by Egon Günther), as Alfons Rogalla
- The Post Office Girl (1988, TV film, directed by Édouard Molinaro), as Anthony van Boolen
- Incident at Twilight (1988, TV film, directed by August Everding), as Maximilian Friedrich Korbes
- La piovra, season 4 (1989, TV series, directed by Luigi Perelli), as Salvatore 'Acidduzzu' Frolo
- I ragazzi di via Panisperna (1989, directed by Gianni Amelio), as Orso Mario Corbino
- Francesco (1989, directed by Liliana Cavani), as Cardinal Ugolino
- La luna negra (1989), as Padre
- Try This One for Size (1989), as Radnitz
- Ocean (1989, TV miniseries), as Damian Centeno
- Rosamunde (1990, directed by Egon Günther), as Levin Austerlitz
- The Bachelor (1990, directed by Roberto Faenza), as Gräsler's Friend
- Présumé dangereux (1990), as Radnitz
- Quiet Days in Clichy (1990, directed by Claude Chabrol), as Ernest Regentag
- Mother (1990, directed by Gleb Panfilov)
- Café Europa (1990), as Mikis
- Ex & Hopp (1991, TV film, directed by Andy Bausch), as Heinrich Hartholz
- The Kaltenbach Papers (1991, TV film, directed by Rainer Erler), as Istvan Kaltenbach
- Money (1991, directed by Steven Hilliard Stern), as The Turk
- Pizza Colonia (1991), as Francesco Serboli
- Fantaghirò (1991, TV film, directed by Lamberto Bava), as The King
- The Great Bellheim (1992, TV miniseries, directed by Dieter Wedel), as Peter Bellheim
- Abissinia (1993), as Enzo Pagnini
- A King for Burning (1993, TV film, directed by Tom Toelle), as Franz Graf Waldeck
- Amigomío (1994), as Grandfather
- The Shadow Man (1996, TV miniseries, directed by Dieter Wedel), as Janusz 'Jan' Herzog
- Life Is a Bluff (1996), as Willi Butzbach
- Schwarzmüller (1996)
- Rossini (1997, directed by Helmut Dietl), as Paolo Rossini
- Smilla's Sense of Snow (1997, directed by Bille August), as Capt. Sigmund Lukas
- Alle für die Mafia (1998), as Don Michele
- Caraibi (1999, TV miniseries, directed by Lamberto Bava), as Coda del diavolo
- Die Affäre Semmeling (2002, TV miniseries, directed by Dieter Wedel), as Walter 'Beton-Walter' Wegener
- Epstein's Night (2002), as Jochen Epstein
- Enigma: An Unacknowledged Love (2005, TV film, directed by Volker Schlöndorff), as Abel Znorko
- A Christmoose Carol (2005, directed by Ben Verbong), as Santa Claus
- Die Rote Zora (2008), as Fisherman Gorian
- Rebecca Ryman: Olivia and Jai (2008, TV film), as Sir Joshua Templewood
- Same Same but Different (2009), as Publishing Director Mr. Behr
- Das Geheimnis der Wale (2010, TV film, directed by Philipp Kadelbach), as Prof. Johannes 'Joe' Waldmann
- The Last Patriarch (2010, TV film), as Konrad Hansen
- Gegengerade (2011), as Baldu
- The Long Wave After the Keel (2012, TV film, directed by Nikolaus Leytner), as Martin Burian
- The Rhino and the Dragonfly (2012, directed by Lola Randl), as Nino Winter
- Crocodile (2013, TV film, directed by Urs Egger), as Richard
- The Invention of Love (2013), as Hermann von Kirsch
- The Last Mentsch (2013, directed by Pierre-Henri Salfati), as Marcus Schwarz
- Autumn Tingles: Speed Dating for Silver Hairs (2014), as Johann Schäfer
- Schubert in Love: Vater werden ist (nicht) schwer (2016), as Professor Schubert
- Winnetou (2016, TV miniseries), as Frederick Louis Santer
- Karl Marx – der deutsche Prophet (2018, TV film)
- Einmal Sohn, immer Sohn (2018, TV film)
- Alte Bande (2019, TV film)
- Real Fight (2021), as Wechselburg

=== German-language voice acting ===
- The Brave Little Toaster (1987), as Kirby (German version)
- Felidae (1994), as Bluebeard
- Dragonheart (1996), as Draco (German version)
- The Fearless Four (1997), as Fred the Donkey
- Jester Till (2003), as Bürgermeister
- Racing Stripes (2005), as Tucker (German version)
- Little Dodo (2008), as Darwin
