= Die Affäre Semmeling =

- Created by: Dieter Wedel
- Starring: Fritz Lichtenhahn; Antje Hagen; Mario Adorf; Robert Atzorn; Heike Makatsch; Stefan Kurt; Heinz Hoenig; Heiner Lauterbach; Richy Müller; Christian Berkel; Dieter Pfaff; Andrea Sawatzki; Irm Hermann; Anja Kling
- Country of origin: Germany
- Original language: German
- No. of seasons: 1
- No. of episodes: 6

Original release
- Network: ZDF
- Release: 2 January – 14 January 2002

Die Affäre Semmeling is a six-part German miniseries, directed by Dieter Wedel and originally broadcast on ZDF in 2002. The story focused on a candidate for chancellor, played by Heinz Hoenig, and his advisor, Sigi Semmeling, played by Stefan Kurt.

The series also starred Mario Adorf as Walter 'Beton-Walter' Wegener; Robert Atzorn as Dr. Klaus Hennig; and Heike Makatsch as Silke Semmeling.
