= Caliber 9 =

- Italian theatrical release poster by Renato Casaro
- Italian: Milano calibro 9
- Directed by: Fernando Di Leo
- Screenplay by: Fernando Di Leo
- Based on: Milano calibro 9 by Giorgio Scerbanenco
- Produced by: Armando Novelli
- Starring: Gastone Moschin; Barbara Bouchet; Mario Adorf; Frank Wolff; Luigi Pistilli; Ivo Garrani; Philippe Leroy; Lionel Stander
- Cinematography: Franco Villa
- Edited by: Amedeo Giomini
- Music by: Luis Enríquez Bacalov; Osanna
- Production company: Cineproduzioni Daunia '70
- Distributed by: Lia Film
- Release date: 15 February 1972
- Country: Italy
- Language: Italian
- Box office: ₤754 million

Caliber 9 (Italian: Milano calibro 9, lit. 'Milan caliber 9'; also released as The Contract) is a 1972 Italian poliziottesco film written and directed by Fernando Di Leo and starring Gastone Moschin, Mario Adorf, Barbara Bouchet, Philippe Leroy, Frank Wolff, Luigi Pistilli, and Lionel Stander.

The film takes its title from the short story collection of the same name by Giorgio Scerbanenco, and is partially based on three of its stories. The musical score was composed by Luis Enriquez Bacalov and performed by the progressive rock band Osanna.

Caliber 9 is the first part in Di Leo's Milieu Trilogy of poliziotteschi films. It was followed by La mala ordina (The Italian Connection) in 1972 and Il Boss (The Boss) in 1973. In 2020, a direct sequel called Calibro 9, was released.

== Plot ==
After a stint in prison, small-time Milanese gangster Ugo Piazza is immediately harassed by his old associates, led by a powerful American launderer known simply as "The Americano" (or "The Mikado" in the English dub), who believe that he stole 300,000 US dollars during a handover, shortly before his arrest for robbery. Piazza emphatically denies the theft, even under coercion from The Americano's volatile right-hand man Rocco. His girlfriend, go-go dancer Nelly Bordon, also believes he stole the money, as does the police commissario, who unsuccessfully attempts to turn him informant.

Piazza meets his former godfather Don Vincenzo, now a blind old man, and his sole remaining capo Chino. Though Rocco mocks Vincenzo's authority, they still hold a begrudging respect for Chino, who has refused to leave his godfather even after everyone else has. The Americano gives Piazza an ultimatum to return the money and resume working for him, but he still insists he doesn't have it and doesn't know who does. Paranoid about more, similar thefts, Rocco begins killing off his money couriers.

Piazza is sent on an exchange of $30,000, happening in a bowling alley. The exchange is crashed by a mysterious assailant in a white scarf (who has been stalking Piazza since his release), who kills their client and steals the brown leather bag containing the money. The Americano sends Rocco and Piazza to kill the men he believes responsible, but when they arrive they're revealed to be Chino and Don Vincenzo. Piazza refuses to slay his former godfather, but Rocco coldly shoots the old man, while Chino narrowly escapes. The Americano has Piazza beaten for his insubordination and is about to have him killed. However, Piazza’s is spared when he convincingly argues that Rocco and the crew were behind the theft of the $30,000.

The Americano retreats to a rural estate with his bodyguards, including Piazza, but is shot and killed in an ambush by a vengeful Chino. Piazza turns his gun on the Americano's men and finishes them off, before Chino dies of his injuries.

Piazza travels to an abandoned church off Milan and retrieves a blue bag with the $300,000 - revealing he had stolen the money from the Americano years ago and orchestrated everything to get him killed. However, he's picked up by police for driving with an expired license and forced to go to the station for an interview.

While in the waiting room, Piazza runs into Rocco (who's being questioned for the shootout at the Americano's house). Rocco, seeing the bag containing the money, shows no animosity and offers the two become partners. Piazza turns him down and is released. He heads to Nelly's house with the money, planning for the two to run away together. Nelly is with Luca, one of Rocco’s crew and the man in the scarf who was behind the theft of the $30,000 at the bowling alley. Nelly had conspired with her secret lover Lucato get the $300,000 from Piazza for themselves.

Luca shoots Piazza, but he manages to kill Nelly with a single punch before expiring. Rocco, who had followed Piazza home, bursts in and beats Luca to death in a fit of rage for his betrayal and disrespecting of Piazza's criminal stature. The police, who had in turn followed Rocco, drag him away from Luca’s bloodied corpse.

== Cast ==
- Gastone Moschin as Ugo Piazza
- Mario Adorf as Rocco Musco
- Barbara Bouchet as Nelly Bordon
- Philippe Leroy as Chino
- Ivo Garrani as Don Vincenzo
- Frank Wolff as the Commissario
- Luigi Pistilli as Vice-Commissario Mercuri (“Fonzino” in the English version)
- Lionel Stander as “L’Americano” (“The Mikado”)
- Giuseppe Castellano as Nicola
- Salvatore Aricò as Luca
- Giorgio Trestini as Franceschino
- Ernesto Colli as Alfredo Bertolon
- Mario Novelli as Pasquale Talarico
- Franco Beltramme as Lorenzo
- Omero Capanna as Alfredo
- Fernando Cerulli as Hotel Clerk

== Production ==
Caliber 9 was Di Leo's second film to be based on the works of writer Giorgio Scerbanenco, following Naked Violence (1969). According to film historian Roberto Curti, the director saw Scerbanenco's works as "ground-breaking", and believed that they shared similarly "bleak, disillusioned" worldviews, noting that the writer would have enjoyed the film's "terrible yet bitterly ironic game of appearances, coincidences and double-crosses which moves the story to its inevitable conclusion". Credited as being based on Scerbanenco's 1969 short story collection Milano calibro 9, the script is largely an original work, although it was partially influenced by three of the book's stories: its depiction of an exchange of two packages between a series of couriers, culminating in both packages simultaneously exploding upon reaching their final destination, is taken from "Stazione centrale ammazzare subito", while minor references are made to "Vietato essere felici" and "La vendetta è il miglior perdono".

The film's working title was Da lunedì a lunedì ("From Monday to Monday"), with the script indicating that title cards were to denote the time and day of each scene. Editor Amedeo Giomini revealed that while these title cards appeared on the film's workprint, they were not used on the theatrical prints.

While discussing Caliber 9 years after its release, Di Leo regretted not deleting the scenes between Frank Wolff's right-wing Police Commissioner and his left-wing colleague Fonzino/Mercuri, played by Luigi Pistilli, believing that their inclusion hampered the film's pacing and diverged from its focus on the criminal characters.

== Music ==
The soundtrack for the film, Preludio Tema Variazioni e Canzona, is a collaboration album between Luis Enríquez Bacalov and the Italian progressive rock group Osanna.

=== Soundtrack ===
Preludio, tema and Canzona are written by Bacalov and performed by Osanna, the Variazione songs (Variation) are composed by Lino Vairetti and performed by Osanna. All the songs are instrumental except My Mind Flies and Canzona. The movie also includes 2º tempo: Adagio (Shadows) performed by New Trolls.

1. Preludio
2. Tema
3. Variazione I (To Plinius)
4. Variazione II (My Mind Flies)
5. Variazione III (Shuum...)
6. Variazione IV (Tredicesimo cortile)
7. Variazione V (Dianalogo)
8. Variazione VI (Spunti)
9. Variazione VII (Posizione raggiunta)
10. Canzona (There Will Be Time)

== Release ==
Caliber 9 was released in Italy on February 15, 1972 where it was distributed by Lia Film. To qualify for a VM14 rating, the Italian film ratings board requested cuts to the scene in which Rocco tortures a courier with a razor, and the climactic sequence in which Rocco bludgeons Luca to death; Giomini felt that the censorship of the latter scene lessened its intended impact. It grossed a total of 754,443,000 Italian lire on its theatrical run in Italy.

The film was released on Blu-ray by Raro Video on February 22, 2011. It was released again on Blu-ray and DVD by Arrow Video on June 16, 2015.

== Reception ==
From contemporary reviews, a 98-minute English-dubbed version of the film, titled The Contract, was reviewed by John Raisbeck of the Monthly Film Bulletin. Raisbeck stated that "after a briskly edited pre-credits sequence, [...] The Contract degenerates into a patchy gangster thriller". The review noted that the film "announces a number of themes-the crime syndicate's big business connections, the Melvillian respect shared by the two professionals Ugo and Chino-without developing any of them satisfactorily", and criticized Mario Adorf's portrayal of Rocco as "often verg[ing] on caricature".

== Legacy ==
Di Leo's later film Blood and Diamonds (1978) is considered by Curti to be a "reversal" of Caliber 9, with the relationships in the film being contrary to each other. Blood and Diamonds' working title was Roma calibro 9, and Barbara Bouchet plays similar roles in both films.

Moschin would later play a gangster character, Don Fanucci, in The Godfather Part II (1974).

The film was referenced in Kobe Bryant's Nike Italia advertisement campaign short entitled "Milano Kalibro Kobe", and featured Italy international footballers Giampaolo Pazzini, Gennaro Gattuso, Alberto Aquilani, Claudio Marchisio and Marco Materazzi, Dutch international footballer Wesley Sneijder and Italian NBA star Marco Belinelli in parodies of the original characters. The commercial was directed by Enzo G. Castellari, who, like Di Leo, was a prominent director of poliziottesco films.

== Sequel ==
A direct sequel film, Calibro 9, was produced in 2020. It is directed by Toni D'Angelo and produced by Gianluca Curti, whose father Ermanno was a co-producer of the first film. The cast stars Marco Bocci as Fernando Piazza, the son of Moschin's character, with Barbara Bouchet reprising her role as Nelly Bordon. It also features Michele Placido, Alessio Boni, and Kseniya Rappoport.

== See also ==
- List of Italian films of 1972

== Notes ==
=== References ===
- Curti, Roberto (2013). Italian Crime Filmography, 1968-1980. McFarland. ISBN 978-0786469765.
