= Thomas Dirnhofer =

Thomas C. "Thomy" Dirnhofer (born 1975 in St. Gallen, Switzerland) is an Austrian cinematographer and director.

== Life ==
Thomas Dirnhofer was born in St. Gallen. He is a passionate climber.

Since the 1990s he was cinematographer of various advertising spots and music videos, mostly in cooperation with director Philipp Kadelbach. Under the moniker "Begbie" Kadelbach and Dirnhofer realised nearly 300 advertising spots.

Dirnhofer accompanied the climbers David Lama and Peter Ortner for Red Bull Media House from 2010 to 2013 during two attempts to climb the Cerro Torre. Based on the film material Dirnhofer produced the movie Cerro Torre: A snowball's chance in Hell, who was recognised at Banff Mountain Film Festival 2014 as best film in the category "Climbing". The film also received the Public's Choice Award at Filmfest St. Anton 2014.

Im 2018 Dirnhofer was cinematographer for Philipp Kadelbach's film So viel Zeit.

Together with his sister, artist Veronika Dirnhofer, he engages for the refugee relief organisation solidarity matters.

Thomy Dirnhofer lives with his wife and his two children in Vienna.

== Selected filmography ==
director

- 2013: Cerro Torre: A snowball's chance in Hell (documentary)
- 2016: Explorers – Abenteuer des Jahrhunderts (documentary series, 1 episode)

cinematography

- 2013: Cerro Torre: A snowball's chance in Hell (documentary)
- 2018: So viel Zeit
