= Das Geheimnis der Wale =

2010 film

Das Geheimnis der Wale (lit. 'The Secret of the Whales') is a German 2010 two-part TV film directed by Philipp Kadelbach.

== Plot ==
Anna Waldmann flies to New Zealand with her 14-year-old daughter Charlotte to join Charlotte's father Professor Johannes Waldmann, who is working as a respected whale researcher on a report commissioned by a local authority. He is about to decide whether or not a large gas company can prospect for oil off the New Zealand coast when he is killed in a boat accident. Anna becomes suspicious and joins forces with Chris (an opponent of the company) to uncover an environmental scandal.

== Cast ==
- Christopher Lambert as Chris Cassell
- Veronica Ferres as Anna Waldmann
- Mario Adorf as Johannes Waldmann
- Alicia von Rittberg as Charlotte Waldmann
- Rawiri Paratene as Amiri Mamoe
- Fritz Karl as Steven Thompson
- Clemens Schick as Eric Cluster
- Sean Cameron Michael as Journalist
- Pavlína Němcová as Dr. Karuna
- Jo-Ann Strauss as Journalist
