= Milano calibro 9 =

- First edition
- Author: Giorgio Scerbanenco
- Language: Italian
- Publisher: Garzanti
- Publication date: 1969
- Publication place: Italy
- Pages: 359

Milano calibro 9 is a 1969 short story collection by the Italian writer Giorgio Scerbanenco. It contains 22 stories concerned with the underworld of Milan. The book has been translated to French and Spanish.

== Contents ==
1. Milan by Calibro 9
2. Basta col cianuro
3. Preludio per un massacro estivo
4. In pineta si uccide meglio
5. Spara che ti passa
6. Stazione centrale ammazzare subito
7. Minorenne da bruciare
8. Conoscerei scopo matrimonio
9. Una signorina senza rivoltella
10. Non si vive di solo poker
11. Piccolo Hotel per sadici
12. Quando una donna piace forte
13. Bravi ragazzi bang bang
14. Strangolare ma non troppo
15. Ubbidire o morire
16. Vietato essere felici
17. A Porta Venezia con paura
18. Come è fatto un mostro?
19. La giustizia quasi arriva ad Arzavò
20. Il nodo Luisa
21. La vendetta è il miglior perdono
22. Ricordati Cuore Infranto

== Adaptations ==
Stories from book were the basis for the 1972 film Caliber 9, directed by Fernando Di Leo, and the 1976 film Young, Violent, Dangerous, directed by Romolo Guerrieri.
