= Dieter Wedel =

German television director (1939–2022)

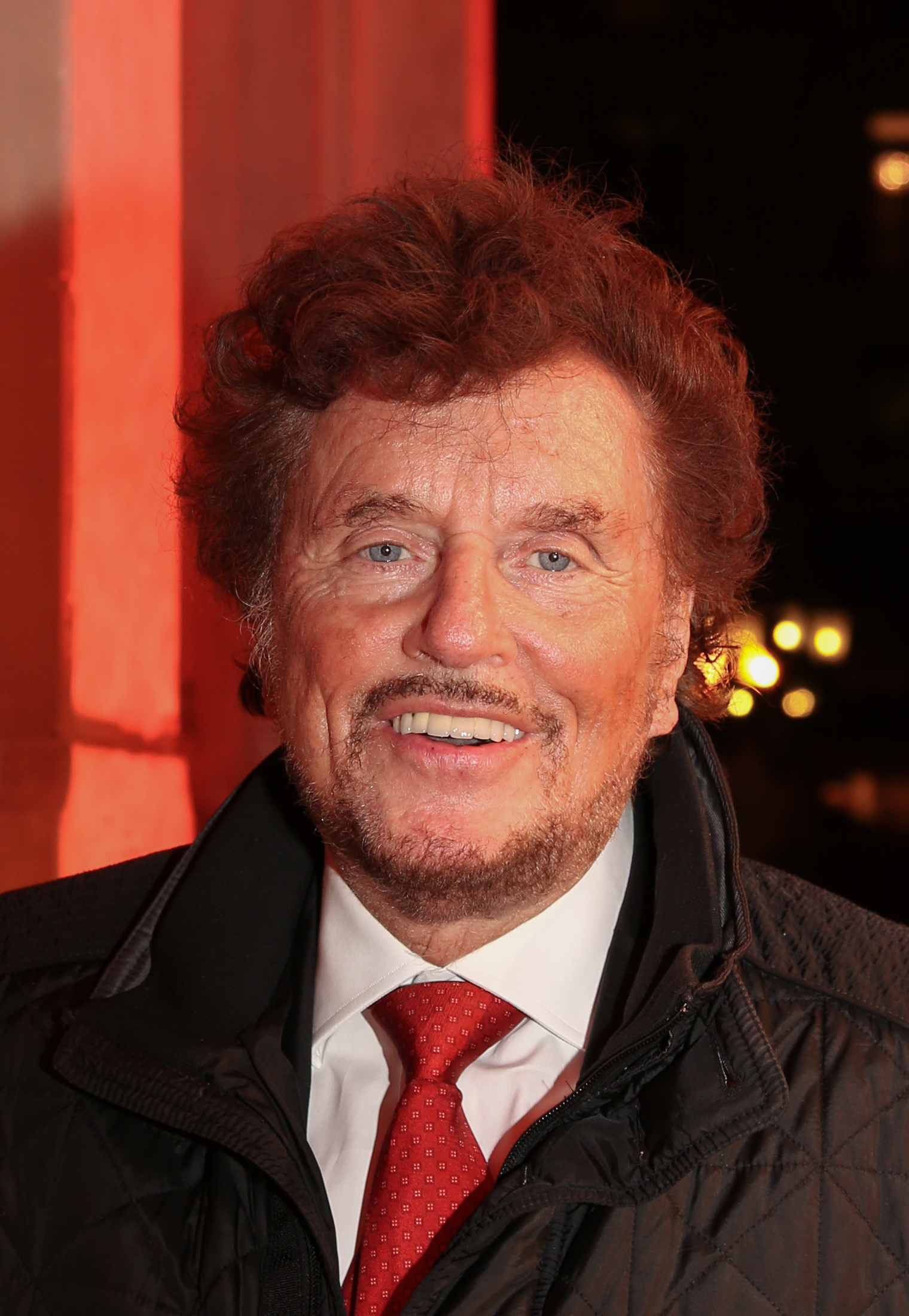
- Wedel in 2016
- Born: Dieter Karl Cäsar Wedel; 12 November 1939; Frankfurt am Main, Hesse-Nassau, Prussia, Germany
- Died: 13 July 2022 (aged 82); Hamburg, Germany
- Occupations: Film director Screenwriter
- Years active: 1966–2018

Dieter Karl Cäsar Wedel known as Dieter Wedel (German: [ˈdiːtɐ kaʁl ˈt͡sɛːzaʁ ˈveːdl̩]; 12 November 1939 – 13 July 2022) was a German director.

== Biography ==
Wedel was born on 12 November 1939. He has directed several television productions since the late 1960s, among them very popular mini-series like The Great Bellheim, The Shadow Man, The King of St. Pauli and Die Affäre Semmeling. He is considered to be one of Germany's best-known television directors. He also served as the artistic director of the Nibelung Festival in Worms between 2003 and 2014.

In the Me Too campaign, Wedel was accused in January 2018 by several actresses of sexual harassment, and in the case of actress Jany Tempel, even rape. There have been official concerns about the alleged long-time coverup of Wedel's actions because most of his work was done through public broadcasting and received government money. After official investigations against him, Wedel resigned from his post as the artistic director of the Bad Hersfelder Festspiele.

Wedel was married to Ursula Wolters for many years, but in the past he has also had relationships with other women, among them actresses Hannelore Elsner and Ingrid Steeger. He had six children.

Wedel died from leukemia on 13 July 2022 in Hamburg, at the age of 82.

== Filmography ==
(with producing television channel behind the title)

- 1969: Willi, NDR
- 1970: Gedenktag, NDR
- 1971: Hamburg Transit: Grüner Türke, NDR/ARD
- 1972: Einmal im Leben – Geschichte eines Eigenheims (TV miniseries), NDR/ARD
- 1972: Das Kurheim (TV series), ARD
- 1973: Tatort: Ein ganz gewöhnlicher Mord, ARD
- 1974: Eintausend Milliarden, NDR/ARD
- 1974: Eiger, ARD
- 1974: Aus Liebe zum Sport (TV series), ARD
- 1975: Die Rakete, ARD
- 1976: Alle Jahre wieder – Die Familie Semmeling (TV miniseries), ARD
- 1977: Das Rentenspiel
- 1981/1982: Bretter, die die Welt bedeuten (TV series), SR/ARD
- 1982: Schwarz Rot Gold: Alles in Butter, NDR/ARD
- 1982: Schwarz Rot Gold: Unser Land, NDR/ARD
- 1983: Das Protokoll, NDR/ARD
- 1984: Der Mann, der keine Autos mochte, ZDF
- 1985: Schwarz Rot Gold: Nicht schießen!, NDR/ARD
- 1987: Kampf der Tiger, ZDF
- 1988: Wilder Westen inclusive (TV miniseries), WDR/ARD
- 1993: The Great Bellheim (TV miniseries), ZDF
- 1994: Sylvia Brandt – Ich greife ein, Sat.1
- 1996: The Shadow Man (TV miniseries), ZDF
- 1998: The King of St. Pauli (TV miniseries), Sat.1
- 2002: Die Affäre Semmeling (TV miniseries), ZDF
- 2006: Papa und Mama, ZDF
- 2007: Mein alter Freund Fritz, ZDF
- 2010: Greed, ARD
