= The Nibelungs (Hebbel) =

1861 German tragedy by Friedrich Hebbel in three parts

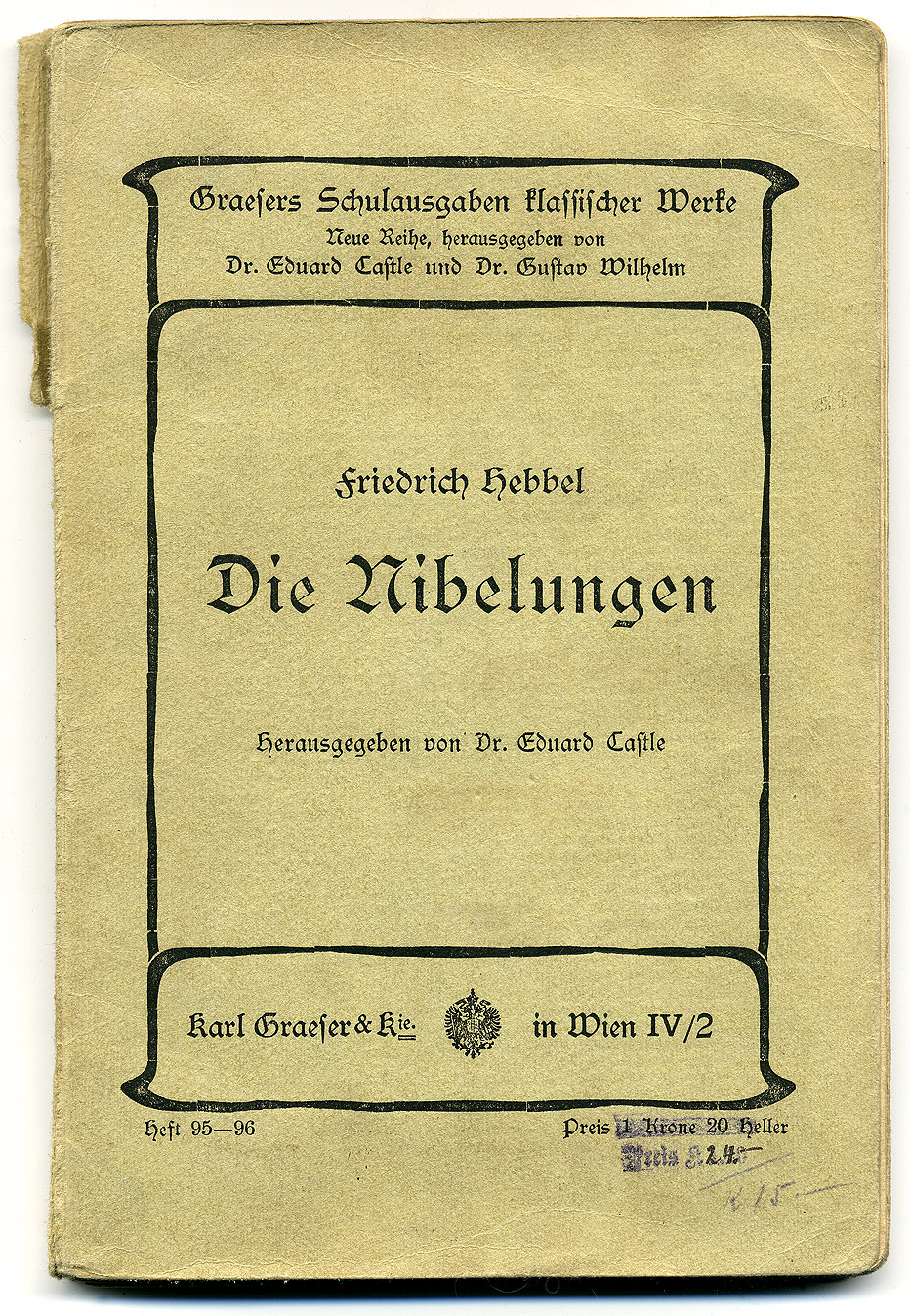
Friedrich Hebbel Die Nibelungen (school edition around 1900)

The Nibelungs (Die Nibelungen) is a German tragedy by Friedrich Hebbel in three parts, and was originally intended for performance over two evenings. The individual parts are: The Invulnerable Siegfried, Siegfried's Death and Kriemhild's Revenge. Hebbel wrote the drama between the years 1850 and 1860. The first two parts were first performed on 31 January 1861. It is one of the most noteworthy adaptations of the Nibelung material for the theater.

Stanley Hauer posits Hebbel's work as a major influence on Fritz Lang's 1924 film Die Nibelungen. "Like the film, Hebbel's drama contrasts the Christian world of Worms with the paganism of Hägen and Brunhild;"
