= Volkstheater, Vienna =

Theatre in Vienna, Austria

Coordinates: 48°12′19″N 16°21′24″E

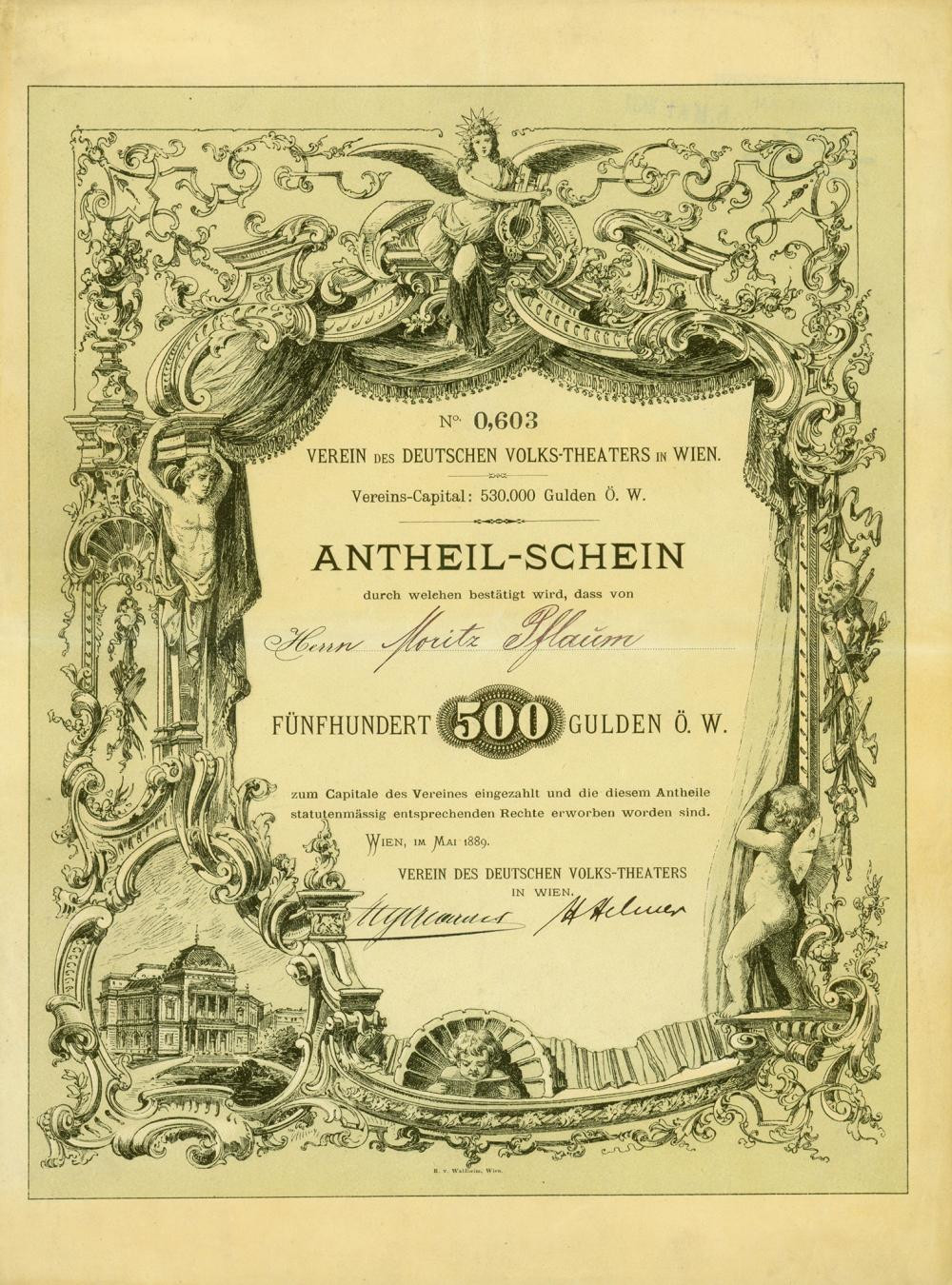
Share certificate of the Verein des Deutschen Volks-Theaters, issued in May 1889

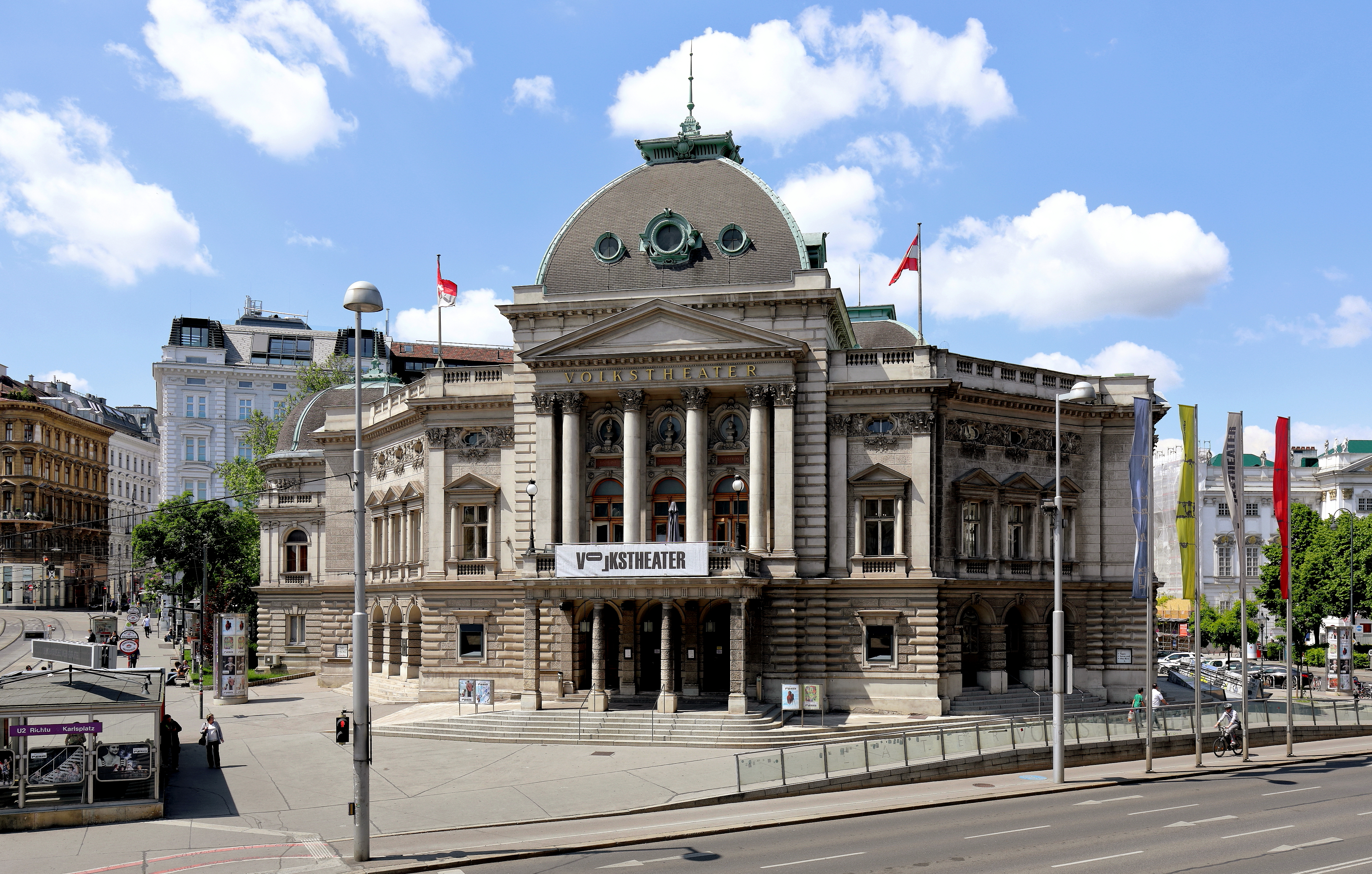
The Volkstheater

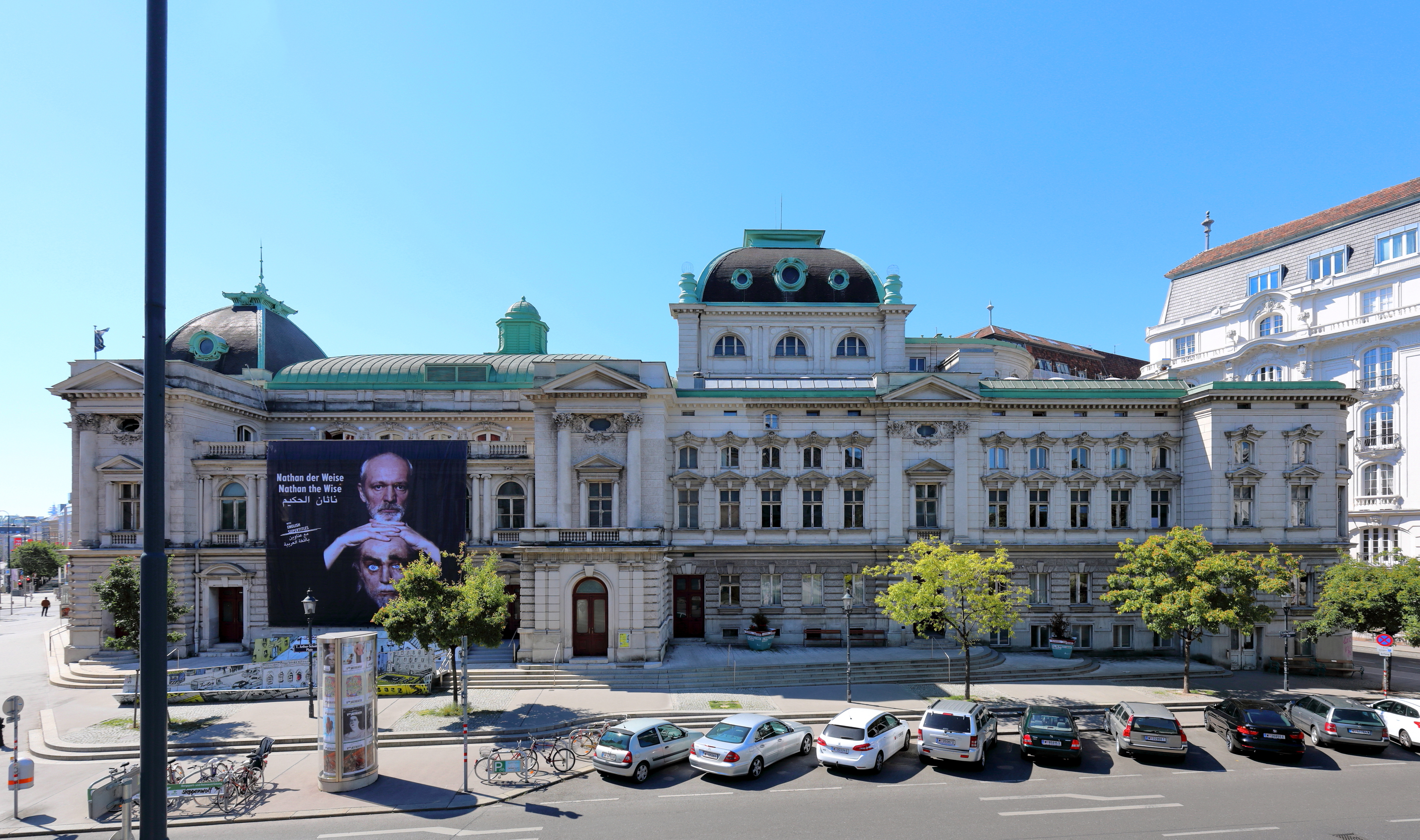
North side

The Volkstheater (translated as "People's Theatre") in Vienna was founded in 1889 by request of the citizens of Vienna, amongst them the dramatist Ludwig Anzengruber and the furniture manufacturer Thonet, in order to offer a popular counter weight to the Hofburgtheater. It was erected according to designs by Ferdinand Fellner and Hermann Helmer, who attempted to reconcile their plans with historicism. It is located in Neubau, the seventh district of Vienna.

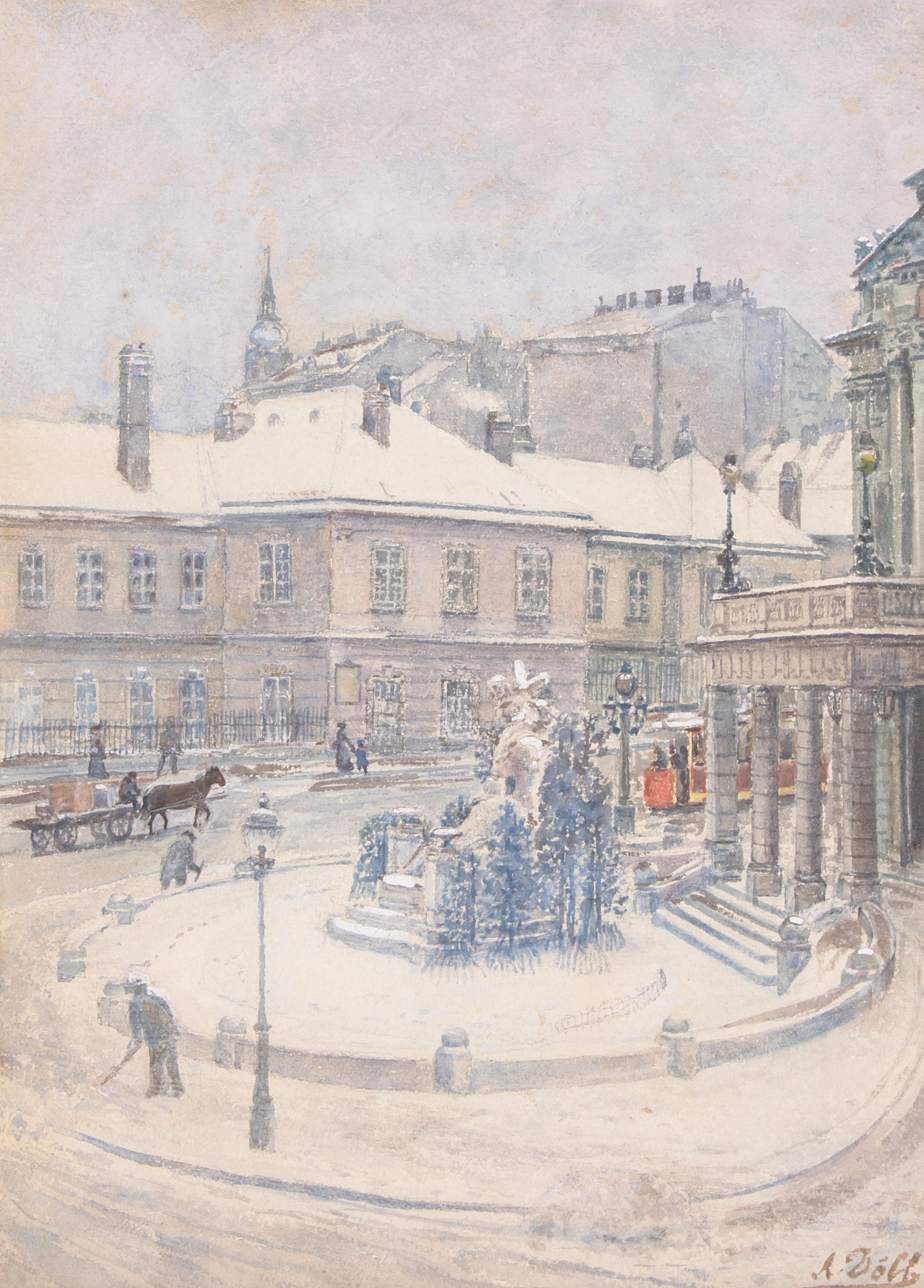
Volkstheater Vienna (1900) by E. T. Dölb

The founders of this stage had a theatrical stage in mind, in order to expose wider circles of the population of Vienna to classical and modern literature whilst staging these next to more traditional plays. The theatre follows this tradition even today. New productions of the classics are always in the pipeline along with regular reinterpretations of works by Ferdinand Raimund and Johann Nestroy and many new plays and reruns. Special attention is given to Austrian playwrights of old and new.

In 2005 Michael Schottenberg became art director of the Volkstheater.

In 2005 the Volkstheater started an alternative theater stage called "Volkstheater Hundsturm" in Margareten, the fifth district of Vienna. It is a place for experimental theater (e.g. Wojtek Klemm, Dejan Dukovski, monochrom).

The Volkstheater station of lines U2 and U3 of the Vienna U-Bahn is located here.
