= Leonetta Cecchi Pieraccini =

Italian painter (1882–1977)

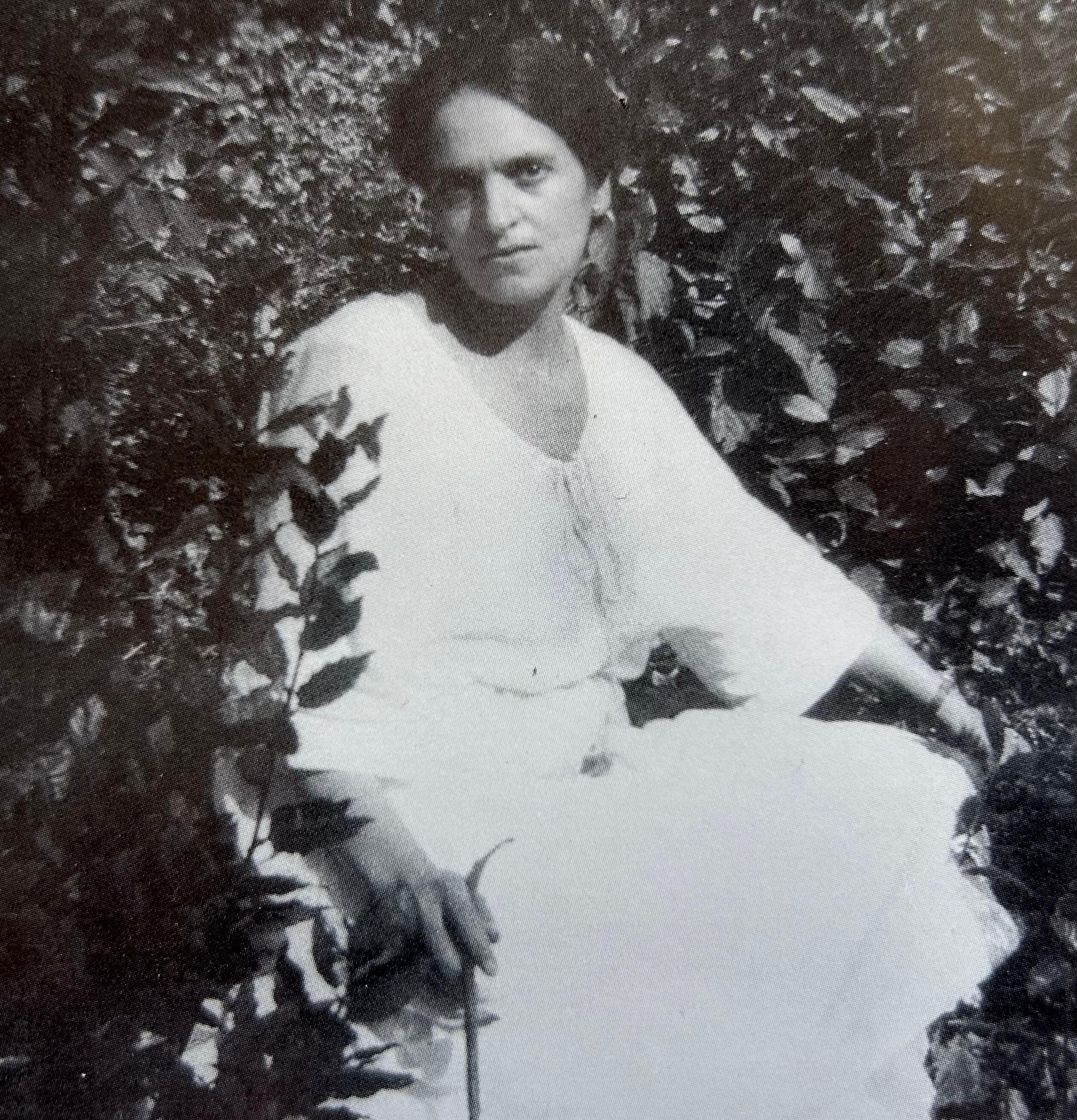
- Cecchi Pieraccini in 1911
- Born: Leonetta Pieraccini; 31 October 1882; Poggibonsi, Tuscany, Kingdom of Italy
- Died: 23 September 1977 (aged 94); Rome, Lazio, Italy
- Education: Academy of Fine Arts of Florence
- Occupations: Painter; writer
- Spouse: Emilio Cecchi (m. 1911; died 1966)
- Children: 4, including Giovanna "Suso" and Dario
- Relatives: Gaetano Pieraccini (half-brother)

Leonetta Cecchi Pieraccini (Italian pronunciation: [leoˈnetta ˈtʃekki pjeratˈtʃiːni]; née Pieraccini; 31 October 1882 – 23 September 1977) was an Italian painter, originally from Tuscany. Like many artists of the period, she is known principally for portraiture, employing watercolours or oils. Her actual output was more diverse, however. She produced a number of landscapes and monotypes. She was also a diligent diarist, and during the later part of her life published several books, which were autobiographical in character. Her work resonated with art lovers and commentators during the first and middle parts of the twentieth century, through which she lived, surviving to a good age. By the time she died, to the regret of admirers, her work was beginning to fall out of favour, however.

== Biography ==
=== Provenance and early years ===
Leonetta Pieraccini was born into a family of landowners in Poggibonsi, at a time when it was still a small country town, set in the Elsa Valley (Valdelsa) in the hilly countryside north of Siena. Ottaviano Pieraccini, her father, was a physician, prominent in the town as a socialist and an intellectual. She was among her father's younger children. Her mother, born Argene Zani (1848-1926), was her father's third wife. Some indication of the spirit of the household in which she grew up can be inferred from the fact that all her brothers grew up to become physicians and socialists. Her youngest brother, Gaetano Pieraccini, also came to prominence during the summer of 1944 as the first mayor of Florence following the fall of fascism and the liberation of the region.

Leonetta was nine when a court confiscated most of her father's assets in order to compensate shareholders who had lost money by investing in a local bank that he had founded. Losses resulted from a fraud perpetrated by Ottaviano Pieraccini's business partner. Ottaviano Pieraccini spent the years 1891–1894 as a prisoner, in part in his own home under house arrest and in part as an inmate at the Siena city jail.

After that the family relocated to Florence, where they lived in the same apartment block as Giovanni Fattori, although she really only got to know him after 1902, as one of his students at the academy. By this time Leonetta's artistic ability had been noted, and she was sent to take drawing lessons with the Sartoni sisters, well known at the time as portraitists to the city's high society. She was still living with her family when they moved again, this time leaving Tuscany completely and settling at Colmurano, a small medieval hill town located a short distance inland from Ancona, in Marche. Her elder half-brother, Guido Pieraccini (1873-1953), lived at Colmurano and was building his career as a physician. For Leonetta, there was an abundant opportunity to devote herself to painting. She produced portraits and landscapes in the area.

=== Art student ===
She returned to Tuscany in 1902, aged 20, and enrolled at the Academy of Fine Arts in Florence, where she was taught painting by Giovanni Fattori and "decoration" by Augusto Bruchi. Fattori was a leading exponent of the innovative and influential (at that time) Macchiaioli movement in painting. Student contemporaries who became friends included Fillide Levasti, Tommaso Cascella Armando Spadini and his future wife, the beautiful Pasqualina Cervone. It was also during this period that Leonetta Pieraccini first came across the man who later became her husband, Emilio Cecchi. Both were enthusiastic letter writers: thick files of their correspondence survive in accessible archives, to the delight of art history students and scholars of that period. During her first two years at the academy she won four silver medals. In 1904, she obtained a degree that entitled her to teach ornamental design in secondary schools. In 1905, she obtained a further degree in figure drawing and painting.

=== Early work ===
In 1906, at the annual "Promotrice per le belle arti" exhibition at the academy, Leonetta Pieraccini exhibited for the first time. The work in question was a large self-portrait, showing the artist in an outdoor "walking dress", with a background of clouds and foliage. At this time, she was fascinated by the classical romanticist approach of the artist Giovanni Costetti, a noted portraitist. That same year Ottaviano Pieraccini, her father, suffered a cerebral haemorrhage which left him immobilised.

=== Emilio Cecchi and Rome ===
In 1910, Leonetta Pieraccini became engaged to her friend, the essayist Emilio Cecchi, known for his work as a critic of art and literature and as a screenwriter. The two had met some years earlier at the home of their mutual friend Fillide Levasti. Cecchi was also from Tuscany, but had lived and worked in Rome since 1906. The marriage took place at Poggibonsi in 1911 and was followed in 1912 by the painful loss of Mario, their first child, who was stillborn. Three more children were born to the couple in 1913, 1914 and 1918: all three grew to adulthood. Despite the pressures of managing a young family, Leonetta Cecchi Pieraccini did not abandon her painting. Indeed, according to one commentator, the decade between 1911 and 1920 was, in terms of her artistic output, the most fruitful of her life. Directly after the wedding, the couple had moved into their new home, a studio apartment at Via Nomentana 331, in a fashionable district at what was then the north-eastern edge of Rome.

=== Networking ===
During the early years of the Cecchis' marriage, Emilio Cecchi was working intensively on a commission he had accepted from Olindo Malagodi to produce a History of Nineteenth Century English literature for La Tribuna: the volume was published in 1915. The Cecchis' apartment quickly became a popular meeting point for a generation of Rome's artists and intellectuals. Frequent visitors identified by Leonetta herself in her later writings include Armando and Pasqualina Spadini (who had also made the move to Rome), Antonio Baldini, Alfredo Gargiulo, Giuseppe Antonio Borgese, Fausto Torrefranca, Giovanni Amendola, Sibilla Aleramo, Vincenzo Cardarelli, Goffredo Bellonci and Cesare Pascarella, as well as Olga Resnevič and her physician husband, Angelo Signorelli (1878–1952). It seems also to have been at around the same time that Leonetta began to keep a diary, which she would faithfully maintain for the rest of her life, and which would provide material for books which she would publish half a lifetime later.

=== Early successes. War years ===
In 1912, she exhibited a portrait at the 81st exhibition of the Society of Fine Arts Lovers ("Società di amatori e cultori di belle arti") in Rome. In the years that followed she exhibited at the Second and Third International Arts Exhibitions of the Rome Secession. During 1915, after many months of secret negotiations with governments in Berlin, London and Paris and much political division at home, Italy joined the belligerents in World War I, persuaded to fight alongside the British by promises of post-war territorial rewards. Emilio Cecchi was conscripted and on 10 May 1915 headed off for Alessandria in Lombardy. Sent to join the fighting on the northern front, he combined his military duties with a distinguished role as a war correspondent for La Tribuna. In September 1916, he was posted to a desk job with the 8th Army Corps, which involved a posting to Florence. Leonetta left Rome with their two small daughters and joined her husband in Florence. Two of her pictures from this period were exhibited at the Fourth International Arts Exhibitions in 1916 and won powerfully positive reviews from Cipriano Efisio Oppo in L'Idea Nazionale, Arturo Maraini in La Tribuna and Arturo Lancellotti in Emporium. One of the paintings in question was a portrait of her husband: the other was a still life. Leonetta Cecchi Pieraccini's reputation as an artist was established.

=== After the war ===
In 1918, as the war drew to a close, three of her portraits and a landscape were included in the "Young Artists' Exhibition" ("Mostra d’arte giovanile") organised by Carlo Tridenti and Marcello Piacentini at the Casina de Pincio in Rome. Again, her work was met with favourable critical reviews. Later that year, Emilio Cecchi was offered and accepted a journalism assignment by the "Italian foreign action Bureau" which meant a lengthy stay in England for him, while Leonetta remained in Florence with the children, of whom there were by this time three. During 1919, the couple were able to meet up together for a short stay in Paris. They returned to Florence soon afterwards and immediately set about moving back to Rome. On account of a desperate shortage of suitable housing in the capital, during 1920, they set up their family home, temporarily, at Ariccia, in the hills to the east of Rome, however. Before too much longer, they were able to move to within the city limits, acquiring an apartment along the Via Appia Nuova. Cecchi returned to working on La Tribuna and was also one of seven co-founders of the La Ronda, a monthly literary review magazine targeting Rome's intellectual élite: the first edition appeared in April 1919 and the last in December 1923.

=== First solo exhibitions. Critical reactions ===
In February 1921 Leonetta Cecchi Pieraccini agreed to collaborate in her first solo exhibition. The location was the "Casa d'Arte Bragaglia" (gallery), opened three years earlier by Anton Giulio Bragaglia. Leonetta was encouraged to go ahead with the exhibition by her friend Armando Spadini, who also helped with the selection of pictures to be exhibited. The exhibition featuring approximately 50 oil paintings and watercolours was a critical success, receiving another enthusiastic review from Oppo in L'Idea Nazionale. The first solo exhibition of her own works which she arranged herself involved 42 of her paintings, displayed a few years later in 1928, at the "Art Room" attached to the literary magazine La Fiera Letteraria ("Literary fair") in Milan. (Note: The appeal to art lovers of Pieraccini's 1928 exhibition at La Fiera Letteraria was enhanced by the well-known Milanese futurist artist Carlo Carrà, who contributed an introduction for the catalogue.)

Through the 1920s her work continued to appear at exhibitions in Rome, notably at the Art Biennale exhibitions held in Rome in 1921 and 1923. The second of these included two of Pieraccini's "oval portraits" of women, featuring Andriulli Peruzzi and Rosina Pisaneschi, the wife of the writer-commentator Alberto Spaini. These two portraits were picked out for special commendation by Ugo Ojetti, who wrote in Corriere della Sera that "Leonetta Cecchi Pieraccini presents portraits that draw their appeal from a rare blend of power and precision. She manages to combine a freshness of tone with a necessary architectural structure and a vivacity of interpretation". (Note: "Leonetta Cecchi Pieraccini présente des portraits dont le charme tient à des qualités de force et de précision. Elle sait allier la fraîcheur des tons aux nécessités architecturales et à la vivacité de l’interprétation".)

=== A permanent home in Rome: More networking: More success ===
In 1924, the Cecchis relocated again, this time to a more permanent home in the city centre. Their fifth-floor apartment along the Corso d'Italia enjoyed a fine view over the Villa Borghese: it quickly became a meeting place for members of Rome's literary (and artistic) community, and on occasion a source of help and support for friends who found themselves in need. Despite its central location, there was space in the substantial apartment for an "Open Sunday" to be held each week for members of the Cecchis' social circle who lived in Rome or who found themselves visiting the capital. Those who had been regular guests at the Via Nomentana apartment before 1916 were still on the list, which continued to grow during the later 1920s, the 1930s, and beyond. Younger recruits included Nino Rota, Leo Longanesi, Vitaliano Brancati, Mino Maccari and Elsa Morante. Many of the regulars became portrait subjects for Leonetta, including Cesare Pascarella, Massimo Bontempelli, Mario Praz, Riccardo Bacchelli, Giuseppe Ungaretti, Vincenzo Cardarelli, Alberto Moravia, Roberto Longhi and Anna Banti. Of course, the member of the circle whose image she reproduced most frequently, both in drawings and in paintings, was none of these: it was Emilio Cecchi.

Meanwhile, her painting work was increased by the portrait commissions she was receiving. In 1926, she held a solo exhibition at the eighteenth Ca' Pesaro exhibition in Venice. That year her work was also displayed at the Palazzo Permanente exhibition in Milan and at the Modern Art exhibition in Brighton. In 1927 she was one of ten artists whose works were selected by Margherita Sarfatti of the government-backed "Società degli Amatori e Cultori di Belle Arti" ("Society of Fine Arts Lovers") to be hung in a room at Rome's iconic Palazzo delle Esposizioni to be dedicated to twentieth-century Italian artists. Five of her works were included including two landscapes and two portraits of friends, the writers Antonio Baldini and Giuseppe Ungaretti. The other nine artists whose works featured alongside Pieraccioni's own were Bartoli, Ceracchini, Francalancia, Guidi, Socrate, Trombadori, Trifoglio, Romanelli and Torresini. It was, in essence, a membership list of Rome's modern art establishment during the Interwar period, and Leonetta Cecchi Pieraccini was most definitely part of it.

In 1927, Leonetta exhibited four Ligurian harbour ("marine liguri") paintings at the Rome Exhibition of Maritime Art. Critical reaction was strongly positive, notably from Cipriano Efisio Oppo (again) and from Corrado Pavolini. Due both to her skills as a portrait artist and the appetite for networking that she and her husband shared, she had also by this time become established with the Rome literary establishment as the portraitist of preference for the city's many writers. During the late 1920s, her works were exhibited in substantial numbers at several more locations. Through her career as an artist, Leonetta Pieraccini also contributed illustrations to numerous magazines of the day, notably Bragaglia's Cronache d'attualità during the early 1920s and La Fiera Letteraria (relaunched and rebranded in 1929 as L'Italia Letteraria).

=== New York ===
In July 1930, Leonetta and her husband sailed for New York aboard the SS Conte Grande. Emilio Cecchi had been invited to teach two literature courses at the University of California, Berkeley. Leonetta stayed in the first instance on the eastern seaboard, spending three months in New York. With her friends, the polyglot journalist-scholar Henry Furst and the writer-filmmaker Mario Soldati, she undertook an intense programme of visits to the city's museums and studies of its vistas. Many drawings, watercolours and paintings resulted. She also made some potentially lucrative contacts with principal galleries concentrating on contemporary artworks. She visited Chicago and re-joined her husband at the university campus, before returning to Italy.

=== 1930s ===
Through the 1930s her works again featured at major exhibitions, and Pieraccini's work continued to receive positive reviews. From the early part the decade sources pick out the seventeenth Venice Biennale in 1930, the II Sindacale del Lazio exhibition at around the same time, the first Rome Quadriennale in which her work featured as part of a characteristically very large exhibition in January 1931, the Baltimore Museum of Art, the Syracuse Museum of Fine Arts in 1931–32, and in 1933 the Fine Arts Exhibition organised by the "Sindacato nazionale fascista" (loosely, "national fascist union") in Florence.

1934 was a particularly rich year for exhibitions featuring her work. Some of these were the Fourth Exhibition of the Fascist Fine Arts Syndicate of Lazio, held at Trajan's Market, the Interregional Women's Exhibition of Fine Arts at Rome, the Castellammare Prize Exhibition and the nineteenth Venice Biennale at which, memorably, she exhibited four monotypes along with three portraits, respectively depicting the writer Achille Campanile, the painter Gisberto Ceracchini, and someone identified simply as the "Lady with the Monkey". For Leonetta Pieraccini personally the most important exhibition of 1934 was the one held in December of that year at the Lyceum Gallery in Florence. The exhibition comprised forty-six oil paintings and a handful of monotypes. The principal effect of the show was to confirm the artist's specialism as a portraitist to the literati. Pieraccini portraits featured included those of Antonio Baldini, Pietro Aschieri, Sibilla Aleramo, Alberto Moravia, Carlo Visconti Venosta, Henry Furst, Libero de Libero, Enrico Falqui, Giuseppe Ungaretti, Achille Campanile, Amerigo Bartoli, Roberto Longhi, Arnaldo Frateili, Pietro Pancrazi, Gisberto Ceracchini, Ilo Nuñes, Diomira Jacobini, Sonia di Nuccio and Eugenio Giovannetti.

In August 1936, she travelled to Brazil where she set up a personal exhibition of her works at the Hotel Esplanada in São Paulo. She delivered two lectures in the room of the Dante Alighieri Society on paintings of the nineteenth and twentieth centuries. She stayed in Brazil for three months, also taking the opportunity to visit Rio de Janeiro.

During the second half of the 1930s, Pieraccini's participation in exhibitions became less frequent, partly because there were fewer appropriate opportunities. She did, however, take part in the 1935 Rome Quadriennale, contributing two monotypes and three paintings ("Ballerina", "Giovannella", "Danzatrice in riposo"). In February 1938, she hosted a personal exhibition at the Galleria Gianferrari in Milan, showing fifty of her paintings, a number of monotypes and many drawings. There were three more relatively low-key exhibitions in Rome itself. In 1941, with Italy at war, Pieraccini teamed up with the sculptor Timo Borlotti for a joint exhibition at the Galleria di Roma. After 1945 there was an exhibition at the "Galleria La Finestra" in 1950 and in the exhibition rooms of the Libreria Macchia in 1956. By this time, however, with the rapid post-war advance in western European art of abstractionism, Leonetta Cecchi Pieraccini could no longer identify herself as a part of the modern art establishment in Rome. Increasingly, she had turned, instead, to writing.

=== Writing ===
As she slowly disengaged from participation in art exhibitions, Leonetta Pieraccini became increasingly active with her pen. The 1940s were a period during which several new important news magazines were launched and/or came to prominence. She worked as a journalist with several periodicals and newspapers, especially after the fall of fascism, including Omnibus, launched by Leo Longanesi in 1937, Oggi, L'Europeo and Il Gazzettino. During the Fascist years her magazine contributions frequently appeared not under her own name, but with the by-line "T.T.T.", though the focus of her journalism was on the arts, and not directly political. "T.T.T." was a reference to "Tètta", a diminutive which friends sometimes used in place of "Leonetta".

Leonetta Cecchi Pieraccini's exceptional and acute powers of observation with regard to the world around her were put to good use in her written work, just as they had been in her paintings. Three substantial volumes, published in 1952, 1960 and 1964, display those powers with stark clarity:

- "Visti da vicino" (1954: loosely, "Neighbourhood scenes") in an essentially autobiographical work in which the author recalls a few of her many encounters and conversations with the writers and painters who were (or, when still alive, had been) frequent and welcome visitors to the Cecchis' Rome apartment. Some of the many the arts-world celebrities featured in the book's 303 pages were Cesare Pascarella, Giovanni Fattori, Armando Spadini, Dino Campana, Medardo Rosso and Trilussa.
- "Vecchie agendine, 1911-1929" (1960: loosely, "Old diaries ..."') is a similarly autobiographical work, revisiting much of the same ground, but which now, in the words of one commentator, includes "all the private reflections [absent from the] earlier book".
- "Agendina di guerra, 1939-1944" (1964: "War diary ...") follows much the same pattern, with the difference that it deals with the war years.

In 1911, if not earlier, Leonetta Cecchi Pieraccini became a serious diarist. Much about their character and quality can be inferred from the three volumes that she wrote on them. She continued to add to her diary till 1971, by which time she was a few months short of her ninetieth birthday, by which point she had filled approximately forty notebooks and adapted desk diaries, with a formidable body of information, insights and anecdotes. The diaries have survived and are currently held as part of the Bonsanto Contemporary Archive at the Gabinetto Vieusseux (library) in Florence. There is, in addition, a typescript of the entire set, transcribed by the diarist's younger daughter held in Rome by the Archivio Leonetta Cecchi Pieraccini. (Note: Archivio Leonetta Cecchi Pieraccini, Via Paisiello 27, Roma (across the road just beyond the eastern edge if the Villa Borghese gardens)) Some time later, in 2015, the earlier notebook diaries, covering the years between 1911 and 1929, were published posthumously and in full by Sellerio Editore, a well-respected publishing house based in Sicily. The publication was overseen by Masolino D’Amico, the diarist's great-granddaughter, and embellished with an introduction by Masolino D’Amico, her grandson.

=== Personal tragedy ===
Although Leonetta Cecchi Pieraccini was blessed with a long, active life, she suffered the double tragedy of being predeceased by two of her four children. Mario, her eldest son, was born dead in 1912. Then, in 1959, her elder daughter fell gravely ill. Seven years later, on 16 July 1966, Giuditta 'Ditta' Cecchi Natinguerra died at the conclusion of a long and brutal illness.

=== Later years ===
In November 1972, Dario Cecchi, an artistic polymath who is also a painter, arranged what was intended as his mother's final exhibition, which was held in the Galleria Aldina in Rome. The purpose was to mark Leonetta's ninetieth birthday, although in the event the exhibition opened some weeks after the anniversary in question. Leonetta herself participated with "lively commitment" in the staging of it.

Leonetta Cecchi Pieraccini died in Rome on 23 September 1977. In 1999, a further exhibition was organised by Pier Paolo Pancotto in Poggibonsi to celebrate her memory.
