= Armando Spadini =

Italian painter (1883–1925)

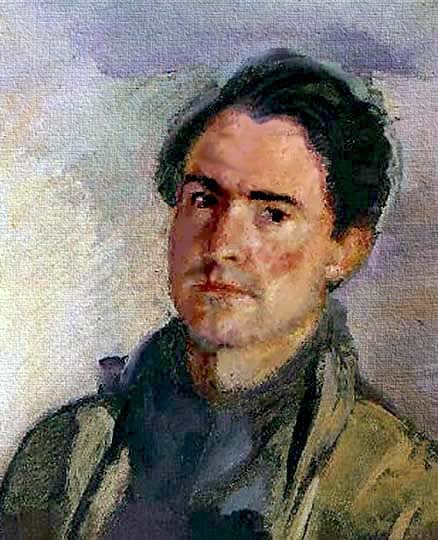
Autoritratto, 1917 (Fondazione Cariplo)

Armando Spadini (1883–1925) was an Italian painter and one of the representatives of the so-called Scuola Romana.

== Biography ==
Armando Spadini, the son of a craftsman and a seamstress from Poggio a Caiano, was born in Florence on 29 July 1883.

After attending the decorated school of Santa Croce he enrolled in the Free School of Nude at the Academy of Fine Arts in Florence where he met Ardengo Soffici and Adolfo De Carolis. In 1901, together with artists such as De Carolis, Galileo Chini, Duilio Cambellotti, Alberto Zardo and many others, he participated in the Alinari competition, obtaining the second prize for the illustration of the Divine Comedy. Soon after he began to make himself known in artistic and literary circles, collaborating with woodcuts and drawings at Papini's "Leonardo" and Borghese's "Hermes".

After completing his military service in 1903–05, he returned to Florence and competed for the 1909 Pensionato artistico nazionale, and was the winner. In 1908 he married Pasqualina Cervone, who he met at the school of Giovanni Fattori, also a painter, who later became the artist's main muse. He moved with her to Rome in 1910, a city in which he initially lived with distrust, but which he soon managed to appreciate.

In Rome he was very close to the critic Emilio Cecchi, who considered him one of the most talented painters of the new century. Armando Spadini was not attracted to the avant-garde and metaphysics, but on the contrary fit into the context of twentieth-century Impressionism.

After a first exhibition at the Pensionato artistico (1912) he participated in the exhibitions of the Secessione Romana in 1913 and 1915, obtaining the first successes. Recalled to the army, he was reformed in 1917 due to the onset of the first symptoms of chronic nephritis which would cause his premature death. He moved with his wife and children to a small villa in Parioli, at the time on the edge of the Roman countryside, which would become the destination of frequent visits from his literary and artistic friends: Emilio Cecchi, Antonio Baldini, Vincenzo Cardarelli, Giovanni Papini, Ardengo Soffici, Giuseppe Ungaretti, Cipriano Efisio Oppo, Giorgio De Chirico and Amerigo Bartoli. He took part in a few exhibitions between Rome and Florence, and in 1918 his works were displayed at the Italian Art exhibition in Zurich, as well as a solo show dedicated to him at the Casina Valadier.

His friendship with Cecchi and Baldini, his frequentation of the cultural environment of the "third room" in the Caffè Aragno helped to bring him closer, in 1919, to the literary magazine "La Ronda".

In 1920, thanks to the interest of Ojetti, who dedicated a short monograph to him that year, he won a professorship in Florence, but renounced it in order stay in Rome.

The growing interest in his painting relieved him of economic difficulties, while his health conditions began to deteriorate. In 1920 he was appointed Academician of S. Luca and from the following year he was part of the committee for the Roman Biennials (1921–1925). In 1922, presented by Savinio, he exhibited his paintings at the spring Fiorentina with the group of "Valori Plastici". In 1923 he took part in the exhibition of Italian art in Buenos Aires. In 1924 he had a personal room, with thirty-seven works, at the XIV Venice Biennale, which consecrated him amongst the now established artists, and was present at the "Carnegie Exhibition" in Pittsburgh. He collaborated with the Soffici magazine "Galleria"; Oppo, Baldini, Cecchi and Soffici dedicated a monograph to him.

Armando Spadini died in Rome on March 31, 1925. His remains rest in the cemetery of Poggio a Caiano, in front of his friend Ardengo Soffici, and on his tombstone it is written: «For art he lived, died, will live».

The 1931 National Quadrennial of Art in Rome dedicated an entire room to the artist with a large collection of his paintings, made available by his collectors.

In his hometown, a street was dedicated to him and one of the 229 busts of illustrious Italians that adorn the Pincio promenade in Rome is dedicated to him.

== Other projects ==
Media related to Armando Spadini at Wikimedia Commons
