= Il Tevere =

Italian Fascist newspaper (1924–1943)

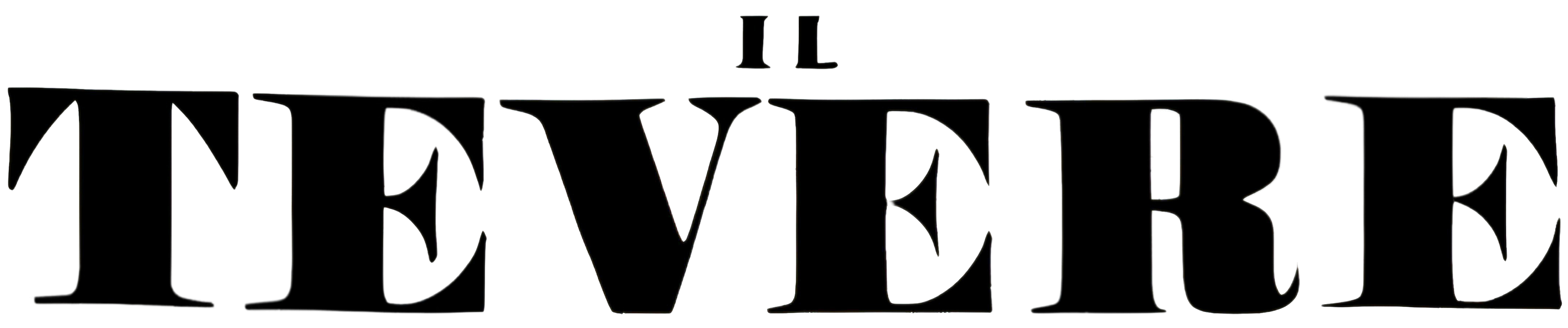
- Type: Daily newspaper
- Founder: Benito Mussolini
- President: Telesio Interlandi
- Founded: 27 December 1924
- Ceased publication: 25 July 1943
- Political alignment: Fascist
- Language: Italian
- Headquarters: Rome
- Country: Italy

Il Tevere (Italian: The Tiber) was a Fascist newspaper which was published in Rome, Kingdom of Italy, between 1924 and 1943. It is known for its founder, Benito Mussolini.

== History and profile ==
Il Tevere was launched by Benito Mussolini in 1924, and the first issue appeared on 27 December that year. Telesio Interlandi was named as the director of the paper which was headquartered in Rome. Corrado Pavolini worked as the literary editor of Il Tevere. Until the early 1930 many significant figures contributed to Il Tevere: Luigi Pirandello, Emilio Cecchi, Giuseppe Ungaretti, Vincenzo Cardarelli, Vitaliano Brancati, Antonio Baldini, Marino Mazzacurati, Amerigo Bartoli, Elio Vittorini, Corrado Alvaro, Ardengo Soffici and Alberto Moravia. Although Telesio Interlandi called Alberto Moravia as "half-Jew" in the pages of Il Tevere, Moravia did not end his occasional contributions to the paper.

However, in the next period Il Tevere became much more antisemitic supporting Nordic Aryanism. In October 1932 it published an interview with Adolf Hitler before the Reichstag elections. From 1934 it began to feature articles on biological racism, and its antisemitic propaganda intensified. In 1938 Il Tevere suggested that the movies featuring Charlie Chaplin, the Ritz Brothers and the Marx Brothers should not be watched by the Italians in that their humor was not Aryan.

The last issue of the paper was published on 25 July 1943 when Mussolini resigned from his post.
