= Beniamino De Ritis =

Italian journalist and writer

- Born: 1 May 1888; Ortona (Chieti), Abruzzo, Italy
- Died: 12 August 1956 (aged 68); Rome, Italy
- Education: University of Florence
- Occupations: Journalist-commentator; Author
- Parents: Tomaso De Ritis (father); Angelina Brocchini (mother)

Beniamino De Ritis (1 May 1888 – 12 August 1956) was an Italian-American journalist-commentator and author.

== Life and works ==
=== Provenance and early years ===
Beniamino De Ritis was born at Ortona, a small coastal town near Pescara. The De Ritis family were part of an ancient line of nobility that traced its roots back to Bologna. His grandfather, Don Camillo de Ritis, had for many years served as mayor of Ortona. By Beniamino's time any aristocratic connections had become too remote to constitute any sort of a theme in family life, however. He attended school locally, then switching for his final two years of schooling to nearly Ancona. He enrolled as a literature student at the Humanities faculty of Rome University, but having embarked on his course of study hemoved on to take a job with the Inspectorate of Monuments at Turin, apparently before having completed his degree course. In 1914 or 1915, despite his relative youth, he accepted a position as editor-in-chief with "L'idea nazionale", a journal of the Italian nationalist movement published in Rome, which in 1914 switched from weekly to daily publication in order to give more weight to its campaign for Italy to become militarily engaged, without further procrastination. in the First World War.

In 1917, De Ritis graduated from the University of Florence with a degree in Modern (Italian) Literature. He extended his journalistic career at around the same time, joining the staff of Il Resto del Carlino, a respected daily newspaper based in Bologna. He returned to Rome in 1918, quickly accepting appointments as a correspondent for a number of mass circulation newspapers, including "Il Piccolo", the principal daily newspaper for Trieste and its region, "Mezzogiorno" (Naples), Il Mattino (Naples) and Il Messaggero (Rome): several of these newspapers, and in particular the fourth of them, had a national reach. During this period, he also published a couple of moderately sized books about foreigners, dealing with their subjects primarily through the twin prisms of history and geography:

- "Piccola storia del popolo rumeno" (Milan, 1915)
- "Piccola storia del popolo russo" (Milan, 1920)

His only novel appeared at around the same time:

- "Il tramonto dei galantuomini" (Florence, 1920)

=== 1922: emigration to New York ===
During 1922, De Ritis emigrated, like many Italians at this time, to the United States of America. There are indications in sources that this move may have been encouraged by the rising tide of Fascist violence in Italy, but the connection is not firmly stated. 1922 is nevertheless significant in Italian history as the year in which the post-democratic Mussolini government took power. In New York he had accepted a job as head of an Italian-language school which, in the event, was never built. Instead, shortly after his arrival, he was offered and accepted an offer from Luigi Barzini (1874-1947) to work on "Corriere d'America", an Italian-language daily newspaper being set up by Barzini, who in addition to being widely viewed as a leading journalist in Italy, had now become a newly arrived New York immigrant-journalist. During his New York years De Ritis also wrote "Ortona", a "homage to the rich history of the town of his birth", which was published in 1925. As the decade continued, and through the 1930s, he was increasingly engaged as a stateside correspondent for leading Italian newspapers, such as Rome's Il Giornale d'Italia, the Gazzetta del Popolo in Turin and, most importantly, the Milanese Corriere della Sera.

=== English language contributions ===
Between 1929 and 1935, he published several significant English-language essays aimed at explaining political developments in Mussolini's Italy to an anglophone readership, notably:

- The Roman accord (1929)
- The Roman Campagna and the Mussolini plan (1932)
- Aims and policies of the fascist regime (1935)

During the 1930s, he also published pieces addressed to Italian readers, in which he attempted to explain America: "Mente puritana in corpo pagano" (Firenze, Vallecchi, 1934) deals with (and disparages) the unresolved American dichotomies of being both a colony and colonizer, frontier land and bulwark of conservation, fundamentalist and unscrupulous at the same time. Antonio Baldini was impressed by what some thought was the best essay De Ritis ever wrote: "He has discovered not one America but ten of them" (loosely "...ha scoperto, non una, ma dieci volte l'America").

Alongside his work for the Italian-language press in New York and Italy, De Ritis worked for various American organisations, including the "Newspapers Enterprises Association" and the "Evening Post". He also became head of the "Italian Literary Service" and of the "Italy-America Association" at the "Casa italiana" ("Italian Building") of Columbia University.

=== Widening horizons ===
After basing himself for a number of years in the United States, De Ritis became more itinerant during the second part of the 1930s, though throughout the period he retained strong ties to America, to which he always returned. During one of his longer stays away from New York, in or soon after 1934 he was offered and accepted as position as director at the Italian Culture Institute on Malta. According to Gaetano Salvemini this was in order to be able to undertake espionage activity on behalf of the Mussolini government in Italy. There is very little indication that De Ritis was a supporter of Fascism in Italy. From his writings it appears he felt no need to cut himself off, nor to distance himself from Italy on account of it. Many of the Italian writers who ended up in exiled in New York during the 1920s and 1930s who became passionate and vociferous enemies of Italian fascism would have seen the De Ritis position as something of a betrayal: that appears to have been the position taken by Gaetano Salvemini. More sympathetic commentators write admiringly of the skill with which De Ritis avoided the "dangerous embraces of the [Italian] fascist régime", with which he retained links for reasons of expediency rather than as any indication of political endorsement.

Between 1933 and 1943 De Ritis contributed regularly to "Nuova Antologia", a venerable and erudite literary journal under the literary editorship of his friend Antonio Baldini. "Nuova Antologia" had been established, originally, in Florence (during the decade when Florence was the capital of a newly unified Italy), but subsequently relocated to Rome. The Italian invasion of France in May 1940 was of little lasting consequence militarily, but it signalled Mussolini's acquiescence to Hitler's constant pressure for Italy to participate in the fighting. Eighteen months later the Pearl Harbor attack, quickly followed (slightly improbably) by Hitler's declaration of war against the United States of America in support of his Japanese ally, were enough to enable President Roosevelt to secure congressional support for American entry into the war alongside the British. International travel became, for a time, impractical. During at least some of the war years, which in U.S. terms ran from 1941 until 1945, De Ritis remained in New York, extending his connections with the literary establishment there, and accepting the presidency of the local version of the Dante Alighieri Society.

After it became possible again, De Ritis resumed his travelling habit, though he still seems to have regarded New York as his permentnat home. There were, in particular, several lengthy trips to Portugal, Morocco and Spain. His last significant work, published in Ticino in 1954, was "Popolo Hidalgo", a thoughtful essay on Spain and her people.

=== Final years ===
During the middle 1950s, suffering from "nervous disorders", De Ritis returned to Europe. Looked after by a daughter in Portugal, he recovered sufficiently to resume his writing. He was still writing to friends, bemoaning his failing health, from an address in Lisbon in January 1956. However, soon after that he moved back to Italy, and briefly renewed his love affair with Rome, the city in which he had been a student some forty years earlier. He died, two nights after being struck by a cerebral haemorrhage and rushed to the "Policlinico" (University Hospital) in Rome overnight on 12 August 1956.

== Principal published works ==
- Nell'orto degli ulivi, Ortona, Officine Grafiche, 1908
- Piccola storia del popolo rumeno, Milano, Vallecchi, 1916
- Piccola storia del popolo russo, Milano, Vallecchi, 1917
- La pace di Tolentino, Firenze, Vallecchi, 1917
- Il tramonto dei galantuomini, Firenze, Vallecchi, 1920
- Ortona, Roma, Equino, 1925
- The Roman Accord, New York, 1929
- The Roman Campagna and the Mussolini plan, New York, 1932
- Mente puritana in corpo pagano, Firenze, Vallecchi, 1934
- Aims and policies of the fascist regime, New York, 1935
- La terza America, Firenze, Sansoni, 1937
- Storia degli Stati Uniti dalla guerra civile al New Deal, New York, 1939
- Popolo Hidalgo, Lugano, La Lampada; 1954
