= Gaetano Pieraccini =

Italian politician (1864–1957)

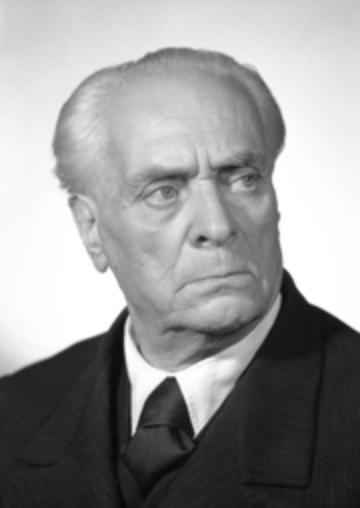

Senator of the Italian Republic
- In office 1948–1953

Mayor of Florence
- In office 11 August 1944 – 29 November 1946
- Preceded by: Giotto Dainelli Dolfi (podestà)
- Succeeded by: Mario Fabiani

Member of the Chamber of Deputies
- In office 1921–1924
- In office 1909–1913

Personal details
- Born: 23 December 1864 Poggibonsi, Province of Siena, Kingdom of Italy
- Died: 13 April 1957 Florence, Italy
- Party: Italian Socialist Party (until 1947); Italian Democratic Socialist Party (from 1947)
- Relatives: Leonetta Cecchi Pieraccini (half-sister); Suso Cecchi d'Amico (half-niece); Dario Cecchi (half-nephew)
- Occupation: Physician

Gaetano Pieraccini (23 December 1864 – 13 April 1957) was an Italian physician and politician of the Italian Socialist Party and later the Italian Democratic Socialist Party. He served as a deputy in the Chamber of Deputies of the Kingdom of Italy and as a senator in the Italian Republic during the 1st legislature. He also was the first mayor of Florence after the liberation of the city in 1944.
