= Virgilio Guidi =

Italian artist (1891–1984)

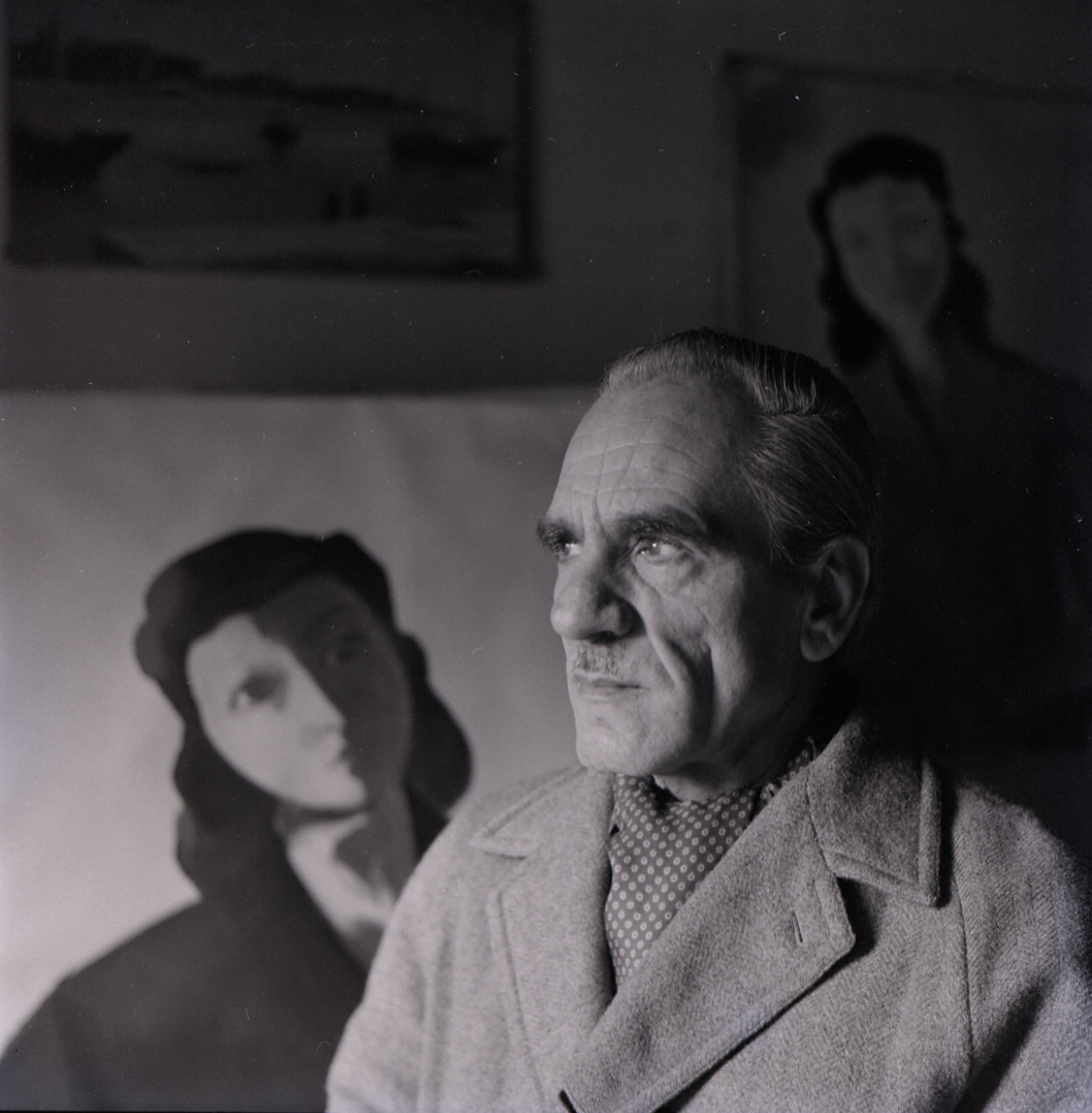
Virgilio Guidi photographed by Paolo Monti, 1952

Virgilio Guidi (April 4, 1891 – January 7, 1984) was an Italian artist and writer.

He was born in Rome into an artistic family. His father was a sculptor. Guidi received his early training at the Scuola Libera di Pittura in Rome and in 1908 began working as a restorer and decorator. He continued his studies at the Accademia di Belle Arti in Rome, where Armando Spadini influenced him. He had few opportunities to view contemporary French art, and instead immersed himself in the study of artists of the Italian Renaissance such as Giotto, Piero della Francesca, and Correggio, and later masters such as Caravaggio. In 1913, he studied the work of Cézanne. In 1915, he participated in the third exhibition of the Rome Secession.

During the decade after the war, Guidi painted modern subject matter in a tonality influenced by the Venetians. He gave his figures a timeless appearance by simplifying clothing details and emphasizing volumes. His painting The Visit (1922), which he exhibited at the Venice Biennale of 1922, is one of his many depictions of two women meeting. The composition is reminiscent of a traditional Annunciation, according to Jennifer Mundy, and "marks the end of Guidi's exploration of museum styles and is a confident statement of a new Renaissance-inspired realism in his art." Critical success eluded Guidi until 1924 when he exhibited The Tram (1923) at the Venice Biennale. The painting brought Guidi recognition as a leading artist of the "return to order". In 1925 Franz Roh termed him one of the new magic realists in his book Nach Expressionismus: Magischer Realismus: Probleme der neuesten europäischen Malerei ("After expressionism: Magical Realism: Problems of the newest European painting").

Guidi exhibited in the first and second Novecento Italiano exhibitions in 1926 and 1929. In 1927, he married Anita Bernardi, a sculptor. He began teaching at the Accademia di Belle Arti in Venice. In 1933, he visited Paris for the first time. He had his first solo exhibition in Florence in 1932, followed by solo shows in Milan in 1933 and 1936. In 1935, he moved to Bologna.

After World War II, his work was increasingly abstract. In 1950, he became associated with Lucio Fontana and the Spazialismo movement. From the 1950s onward, he produced thematic cycles of paintings, such as Tumulti ("Riots"), Prigioniera ("Prisoner"), Grandi Occhi ("Big Eyes"), Cielo ("Sky"), and Figure agitate ("Agitated Figures").

In 1959, he published a collection of poetry, Spazi dell’esistenza.
