= Suso Cecchi d'Amico =

Italian screenwriter and actress (1914–2010)

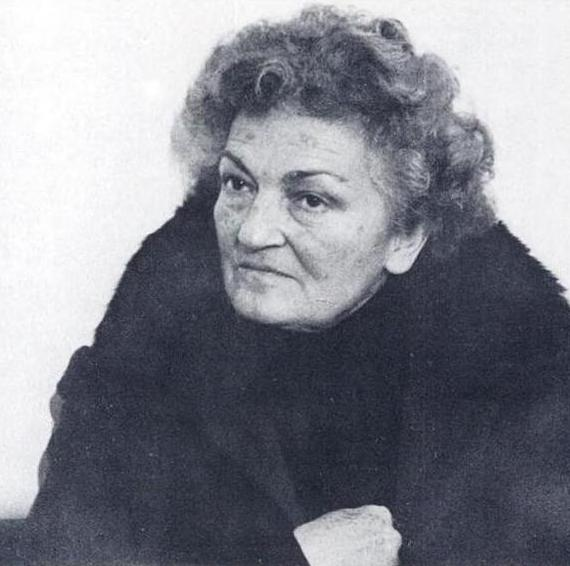
- Cecchi d'Amico before 1980
- Born: Giovanna Cecchi; 21 July 1914; Rome, Lazio, Kingdom of Italy
- Died: 31 July 2010 (aged 96); Rome, Lazio, Italy
- Education: Lycée français Chateaubriand
- Occupations: Screenwriter; actress
- Spouse: Fedele D'Amico (m. 1938; died 1990)
- Children: 3
- Parents: Emilio Cecchi (father); Leonetta Pieraccini (mother)
- Relatives: Dario Cecchi (brother); Silvio D'Amico (father-in-law); Gaetano Pieraccini (half-uncle)

Giovanna Cecchi (21 July 1914 – 31 July 2010), known professionally as Suso Cecchi d'Amico (Italian pronunciation: [ˈsuːzo ˈtʃekki daˈmiːko]), was an Italian screenwriter and actress. She was one of the first female Italian screenwriters and helped pioneer the Italian neorealist movement. Though her screenwriting career spanned sixty years, she won the 1980 David di Donatello Award for lifetime career as well as the Golden Lion for Lifetime Achievement at the 1994 Venice Film Festival.

Cecchi d'Amico worked with virtually all of the most celebrated post-war Italian film directors, and wrote or co-wrote many award-winning films—among them:

- Franco Zeffirelli: The Taming of the Shrew, Brother Sun, Sister Moon
- Luchino Visconti: Bellissima, Rocco and His Brothers, Senso, Ludwig, The Leopard, Conversation Piece
- Vittorio de Sica: Bicycle Thieves, Miracle in Milan
- Michelangelo Antonioni: Le Amiche
- Mario Monicelli: Big Deal on Madonna Street, Risate di gioia, Casanova 70
- Alessandro Blasetti: Lucky to Be a Woman
- Luigi Zampa: Angelina, To Live in Peace
- Francesco Rosi: Salvatore Giuliano
- Luigi Comencini: The Window to Luna Park
- Alberto Lattuada: Flesh Will Surrender

She also wrote the libretto for Nino Rota's opera I due timidi and collaborated on the script of William Wyler's Roman Holiday. She was a member of the jury at the 1982 Cannes Film Festival.

== Early life and education ==
Giovanna Cecchi was born on 21 July 1914 in Rome. She was immediately renamed Susanna by her father, and her parents' Tuscan heritage soon nicknamed her "Suso". Her father, Emilio Cecchi (1884–1966), was from Florence, known for his work as a literary critic and author, but also as a film producer and director, while her mother, Leonetta Pieraccini (1882–1977), originated from Siena and was a well-known painter and writer.

Suso attended the French lycée in Rome and then proceeded to pursue higher education in Switzerland and Cambridge. Upon her return to Rome, she used her proficiency in languages to secure work with the Ministry of Foreign Trade. In 1932, her father returned from a two-year professorship in the United States. Having witnessed the work being done in the film industry abroad, he was made the new director of the Cines studios by the government. Here, D'Amico's exposure to the film industry began as she frequented the soundstages, familiarising herself with the processes, crews, writers, and actors. In 1938, she married musicologist Fedele "Lele" D'Amico, son of theatre critic Silvio D'Amico. Though Lele went into hiding during World War II due to his work for an anti-Fascist publication, the pair had three children who themselves made significant contributions to Italian culture: Masolino, Silvia, and Caterina.

== Career ==
With the war to come, d'Amico left the Ministry and became a translator of literary works, all the while being asked by her father's peers to read scripts in order to give her feedback. Later, she was asked by producer Carlo Ponti and director Renato Castellani to write one herself and her career as a screenwriter was launched. Earning herself the nickname of the Grand Lady of Italian Cinema, d’Amico was a pioneer for women screenwriters and welcomed by her male counterparts thanks to the value of her input as a female perspective that was otherwise lacking in the writers' room, she helped create and write for and about credible female characters. Moreover, she proliferated during the time that Italian neorealism was being created and gaining global interest; she developed a style of writing that combined her literary education and understanding of the people, and was distinct for its succinct dialogue. She kept actors' lines short because, true to neorealist form, they were often amateurs with little experience, and so it was easier to keep their lines short.

== Death ==
Suso Cecchi d'Amico died on 31 July 2010 in Rome. Her death was noted by the president of Italy, Giorgio Napolitano, who stated that she was a "great protagonist of one of the best seasons of Italian cinema".

== Filmography ==
=== Screenwriter ===
- 1946: Professor, My Son
- 1946: Rome, Free City
- 1947: Flesh Will Surrender
- 1947: To Live in Peace
- 1947: Angelina
- 1948: It's Forever Springtime
- 1948: Bicycle Thieves
- 1949: Heaven over the Marshes
- 1949: Fabiola
- 1949: The Walls of Malapaga
- 1950: His Last Twelve Hours
- 1950: Pact with the Devil
- 1950: Father's Dilemma
- 1950: Romanzo d'amore
- 1951: Honeymoon Deferred
- 1951: Bellissima
- 1951: Miracle in Milan
- 1952: The City Stands Trial
- 1952: The World Condemns Them
- 1952: Hello Elephant
- 1952: Red Shirts
- 1953: Empty Eyes
- 1953: Eager to Live
- 1953: The Lady Without Camelias
- 1953: I Vinti
- 1953 Of Life and Love
- 1954: Senso
- 1954: Graziella
- 1954: 100 Years of Love
- 1954: A Slice of Life
- 1954: The Cheerful Squadron
- 1954: Too Bad She's Bad
- 1954: Forbidden
- 1955: Le amiche
- 1956: Kean
- 1956: The Window to Luna Park
- 1956: Lucky to Be a Woman
- 1957: Husbands in the City
- 1957: Defend My Love
- 1957: White Nights
- 1958: Big Deal on Madonna Street
- 1958: La sfida
- 1959: ...and the Wild Wild Women
- 1959: Violent Summer
- 1960: The Passionate Thief
- 1960: La Contessa azzurra
- 1960: It Started in Naples
- 1961: The Wastrel
- 1962: Salvatore Giuliano
- 1962: The Best of Enemies
- 1962: Three Fables of Love
- 1964: Time of Indifference
- 1965: Me, Me, Me... and the Others
- 1965: Casanova 70
- 1965: Sandra
- 1966: Sex Quartet
- 1966: Shoot Loud, Louder... I Don't Understand
- 1967: The Taming of the Shrew
- 1967: The Stranger
- 1968: Pride and Vengeance
- 1969: Unknown Woman
- 1969: Giacomo Casanova: Childhood and Adolescence
- 1970: Metello
- 1971: Lady Liberty
- 1972: Perché?
- 1972: Devil in the Brain
- 1972: Brother Sun, Sister Moon
- 1972: The Adventures of Pinocchio (Film and TV cuts)
- 1972: Ludwig
- 1973: Amore e ginnastica
- 1974: Amore amaro
- 1974: Conversation piece
- 1975: Prete, fai un miracolo
- 1976: Tell Me You Do Everything for Me
- 1976: The Innocent
- 1976: Caro Michele
- 1977: Jesus of Nazareth (miniserie TV)
- 1983: Les Mots pour le dire
- 1984: Bertoldo, Bertoldino e... Cacasenno
- 1985: The Two Lives of Mattia Pascal
- 1985: Cuore
- 1986: Caravaggio (UK)
- 1986: Let's Hope It's a Girl
- 1987: Big Deal After 20 Years
- 1987: La Storia
- 1987: Dark Eyes
- 1987: Private Affairs
- 1988: The Rogues
- 1988: Stradivari
- 1989: La moglie ingenua e il marito malato (TV)
- 1990: Dark Illness
- 1991: Rossini! Rossini!
- 1992: Parenti serpenti
- 1993: The End Is Known
- 1994: Cari fottutissimi amici
- 1995: Facciamo paradiso
- 1998: The Room of the Scirocco
- 1998: Der Letzte Sommer – Wenn Du nicht willst
- 1999: Panni sporchi
- 1999: Un amico magico: il maestro Nino Rota
- 1999: My Voyage to Italy
- 2000: Come quando fuori piove (TV)
- 2000: Il cielo cade
- 2005: Raul: Straight to Kill
- 2005: Three Brothers
- 2006: The Roses of the Desert

=== As actress ===
- 1962: Boccaccio 70 (segment "Renzo e Luciana")
