= Dario Cecchi =

Italian art director and costume designer (1918–1992)

- Cecchi c. 1960
- Born: 28 May 1918; Florence, Tuscany, Kingdom of Italy
- Died: 16 September 1992 (aged 74); Rome, Lazio, Italy
- Occupations: Art director; costume designer
- Years active: 1947–1983 (film)
- Parents: Emilio Cecchi (father); Leonetta Pieraccini (mother)
- Relatives: Suso Cecchi d'Amico (sister); Gaetano Pieraccini (half-uncle)

Dario Cecchi (28 May 1918 – 16 September 1992) was an Italian art director and costume designer.

== Selected filmography ==
=== Art director ===
- Flesh Will Surrender (1947)
- Devotion (1950)
- Women Without Names (1950)
- In Olden Days (1952)
- The Beach (1954)
- Il Bidone (1955)
- Violent Summer (1959)
- The Savage Innocents (1960)
- Via Margutta (1960)
- To Bed or Not to Bed (1963)

=== Costume designer ===
- Fear and Sand (1948)
- Les Misérables (1948)
- The Pirates of Capri (1949)
- Tragic Spell (1951)
- Neapolitan Turk (1953)
- The Naked Maja (1958)
- The Best of Enemies (1961)
- Swordsman of Siena (1962)
- The Black Tulip (1964)
- Cyrano and d'Artagnan (1964)
- The Adventures of Gerard (1970)
- Come Have Coffee with Us (1970)

== Bibliography ==
- Bayman, Louis. Directory of World Cinema: Italy. Intellect Books, 2011.
