= Cipriano Efisio Oppo =

Italian painter (1891–1962)

Cipriano Efisio Òppo
- Born: Cipriano Òppo; 2 July 1891; Rome, Kingdom of Italy
- Died: 10 January 1962 (aged 70); Rome, Republic of Italy
- Occupations: Painter; Illustrator / cartoonist Art critic / commentator
- Parents: Andrea Eugenio Òppo (father); Ottavia Sutto (mother)

Cipriano Efisio Òppo (2 July 1891 – 10 January 1962) was an Italian painter, stage designer, satirical illustrator, and critic. He was born in Rome, the city in which he also lived, worked and died, though his father's and mother's families had both come originally from Sardinia. He was an influential and perceptive commentator and mentor in respect of the Italian art scene through the challenges of the Mussolini years.

== Life ==
=== Provenance and childhood ===
The father of Cipriano Efisio Òppo was Andrea Eugenio Òppo, who worked for the post office. His mother, born Ottavia Sutto, ran the family home when he was small, but he was still very young in 1894, when she died. Although he was always known as "Cipriano Efisio Oppo", and the usage is respected in most subsequent historiography, the name "Efisio" does not appear on his birth certificate so was, presumably, only adopted on his behalf (or by him) at some later date. Although the relationship between father and son could sometimes be confrontational under the one-parent set-up placed on them by circumstances, Andrea Eugenio Òppo was devoted to his son. When he was ten Cipriano's father sent him away to a boarding school at Spoleto, hoping thereby to assure the child an education appropriate to his middle-class aspirations. The boy rejected the institutional rigidities that the school sought to impose on him, however, and the arrangement was terminated after four years.

After returning to Rome full-time in 1904, Òppo enrolled at the city's "Royal Higher Academy of Fine Arts" ("Regia Accademia di Belle Arti denominata di San Luca", as it was known before Italy became a republic) in 1946). His studies were focused on learning to paint, exploiting a natural talent that had already been apparent for some years. College contemporaries who in due course became friends included Francesco Trombadori, Amerigo Bartoli and Antonio Maraini. He supported his studies with work at the prestigious commercial art gallery of Giuseppe Sangiorgi which filled a large part of the vast interior at the Palazzo Borghese. Here he "undertook the duties of an apprentice decorator and copyist of classic works under the guidance of Maestro Oreste Morozzi" (who appears to have combined the roles of head gardener and chief curator at the palace). In 1907 he started attending the academy's "Scuola libera del nudo" ("Free School of The Nude") in the Villa Medici, as a result of which he became more closely acquainted with Umberto Boccioni and Mario Sironi.

Òppo's first known paintings come from this period, notably his "triple self-portrait", which is dated 1910.

=== Cartoonist and artist ===
He embarked on a more public career in 1910/1911 as a caricaturist for the newly launched "Idea Nazionale", a political Rome-based newspaper published weekly between 1911 and 1914, supportive of the anti-Austrian Italian Nationalist Association. From 1910, he devoted himself principally to painting, tending towards the style of "les Fauves" and, in particular, that of Henri Matisse. During the first part of 1912 he began to participate in exhibitions, showing a painting (details unknown) at a portraits exhibition organised by the "International Artistic Association". During 1913 he took part in an exhibition of the "International Artistic Circle" in Rome with five paintings described in one source as "futurist", "cubist" and "sartorian". Later that year his work was on show in Naples at the "National Exhibition of Fine Arts" organised by the "Commissione Nazionale Attività Giovanile". The display included his "Castello del Mistero", a dark and shadowy work believed to have been powerfully influenced by symbolism and neo-Impressionist divisionism. In 1914 he contributed to the exhibition given by the Roman Secession.

Emilio Cecchi, another highly respected art critic who was in addition a close friend, describes Òppo's pictures from this time as employing "colours of an acrid, biting, almost burning" character, reflecting little of the Italian modernism of artistic contemporaries, but rather imbued with "a certain Matissian influence". The critic Alberto Cantù, writing in 1914, was struck by the "violence, aggression and capacity for all excesses before finding its equilibrium" apparent in Òppo's paintings.

Meanwhile, he also engaged in the networking vital to his career progression in the context of the times. Looking back in 1929, Mario Corsi recalled Òppo as having been "rather shy, and on account of the shyness a little contrary. He was always to be found in the "Caffè Greco" along the Via Condotti [in the heart of the city], at the end of the largest room at the farthest end of the establishment, known as "the omnibus", where beardless poets could interact with a few generally youthful and inexperienced journalists, and a few artists - not all of these in their first youth".

The journal "Idea Nazionale", to which Òppo contributed, was transformed from a weekly publication to a daily one in 1914, primarily in order to campaign for the Italian government to intervene militarily in the war which had broken out north of the Alps. One reason for the hesitancy was a lack of any consensus within the government and across the country as to whether Italy should participate alongside its alliance partners (which included Austria) or in opposition to the former colonial power alongside France, which was widely seen to have made Italian unification possible. In the end, partly in response to (at the time secret) British government promises, Italy declared war against Austria in May 1915. Òppo was supportive of this development and very soon volunteered for military service. He was involved in the fighting on the north-eastern front in the mountains round Gorizia. However, he suffered serious injuries to his forehead, jaw and right arm from a Hapsburg bayonet while engaged in close contact fighting. He was sent back to Rome to recover and convalesce, but in the event never returned to the frontline. Instead, he remained in the capital, and resumed providing his illustration to "Idea Nazionale".

=== Cultural organizer ===
He tirelessly dedicated himself to organising Italian cultural and artistic life. As well as being a highly regarded art critic writing for Rome's La Tribuna, his commitment led him to becoming an ambassador for art in public institutions. He became a deputy to Parliament and, in 1932, artistic director of the Exhibition of the Fascist Revolution. He was then appointed secretary of the Direttorio Nazionale dei Sindacati delle Arti Plastiche (National Directorate of Unions of the Plastic Arts) and secretary of the Consiglio Superiore delle Belle Arti (Superior Council of Fine Arts). However, in this field, his most successful work was setting up the Quadriennale di Roma, born from one of his ideas and guided by him as its secretary-general over its first four shows from 1931 to 1943.

During the 1930s and 1940s, he believed he should abstain from exhibiting in Italy, precisely because of his political-administrative activity in the artistic field, not that this stopped his participating in several shows abroad, such as L'art italien des XIX et XX siècles (19th and 20th Century Italian Art) at the Jeu de Paume in Paris in 1935 and at the 1939 New York World's Fair.

=== Post-War ===
Deemed free to return to the Quadriennale as an artist, in its 5th (1948) and 6th (1951) shows.

From 1949 to 1950, he was affiliated to the important collezione Verzocchi, as well as painting a charming portrait, La fiorista. The Verzocchi collection is now held at the Pinacoteca Civica of Forlì.

Among his works are:

- Portrait of a lady (Roma, Galleria Nazionale d'Arte Moderna)
- Eugenia in grey (Turin, Galleria d'arte moderna)
- The florist (Forlì, Pinacoteca Civica)
