= La Ronda (magazine) =

Monthly literary magazine in Kingdom of Italy (1919–1923)

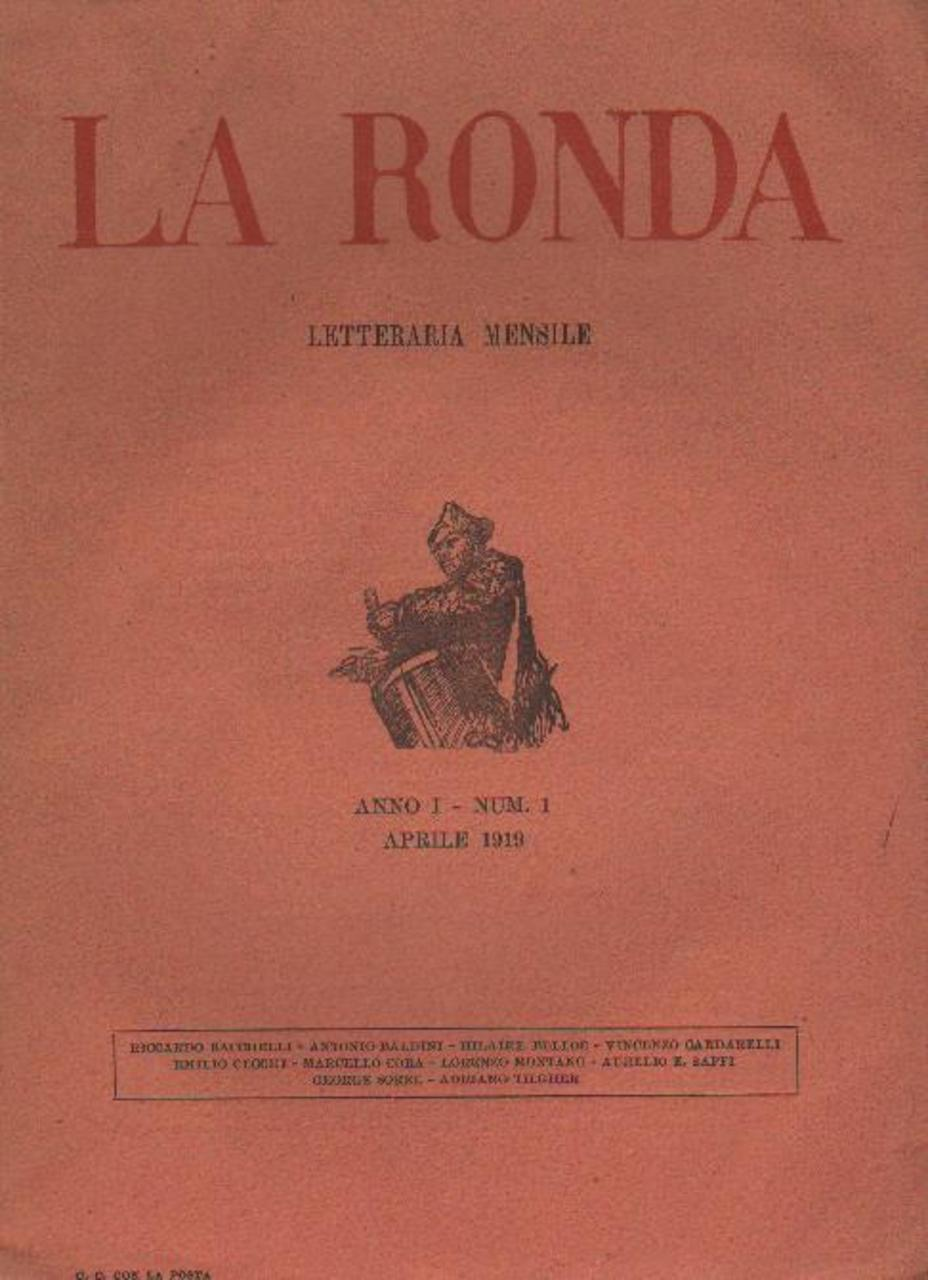
- Cover of the first issue dated April 1919
- Editor-in-chief: Vincenzo Cardarelli
- Categories: Literary magazine
- Frequency: Monthly
- Founder: Lorenzo Montano
- First issue: 23 April 1919
- Final issue: December 1923
- Country: Kingdom of Italy
- Based in: Rome
- Language: Italian

La Ronda (Italian: The Round) was a literary magazine which existed in Rome, Kingdom of Italy, between April 1919 and November 1922. In December 1923 a special issue was also published.

== History and profile ==
La Ronda was first published on 23 April 1919. It was founded by the poet and writer Lorenzo Montano. The magazine came out monthly and was headquartered in Rome. It was modeled on the Bologna-based magazine La Raccolta.

Vincenzo Cardarelli, Aurelio E. Saffi, Riccardo Bacchelli, Antonio Baldini, Bruno Barilli, Emilio Cecchi and Lorenzo Montano were the members of its editorial board in the first year. From the second year only Cardarelli and Saffi continued to serve in the post. In addition, Cardarelli was the editor-in-chief of La Ronda. Following the closure of La Raccolta in February 1919 its editor Giuseppe Raimondi joined La Ronda as its secretary which he held for a while.

The aim of La Ronda was to reinforce a modernist literary approach supporting the values of literature understood as a style. In the first editorial Cardarelli argued that it was time to focus on the Italian modernism which had delayed due to World War I. The magazine managed to develop a literary movement which was called rondismo which harshly criticized the futurism movement calling its adherents as literary destroyers. Though its programme was never fully carried through, it proposed classical perfection in place of experimentation, pointing to Leopardi and Manzoni as stylistic models. La Ronda avoided taking part in political discussions. Instead, it attempted to develop connections with international literary circles to make the Italian literary work much more known. The magazine had an elitist approach and was not read by the masses.

La Ronda had three major sections: discussion of literary and cultural affairs, major literary work and theories and review section which included both letters and reports on other magazines. Notable contributors of the magazine included Guglielmo Ferrero, Vilfredo Pareto, Filippo Burzio, Giuseppe Raimondi, Alberto Savinio, Ardengo Soffici and Carlo Carrà. Of them Ardengo Soffici left the magazine soon due to its apolitical stance and its insistence on returning to formal literary style. La Ronda also featured translations of the work by Robert Louis Stevenson, Herman Melville, Gilbert Keith Chesterton, Hilaire Belloc, George Bernard Shaw, Edgar Lee Masters and Thomas Hardy.

La Ronda ceased publication in November 1922 after producing a total of 34 issues. In December 1923 a special issue was released.

Solaria, a literary magazine started in 1926, was influenced from La Ronda.

All issues of La Ronda were archived under the project Circe at the University of Trento.
