= Piero Jahier =

Italian poet, translator and journalist

Piero Jahier (11 April 1884 – 10 September 1966) was an Italian poet, translator and journalist.

== Life ==
He was born in Genoa into a Protestant family. His father was a Piedmontese preacher whose work took them to Turin and Susa.

After the father's suicide in 1897, Jahier's mother took her six sons to her hometown of Florence. He gained a scholarship and studied theology, but the family's financial difficulties forced him into full-time work at the railway. Nevertheless, he started to write articles, and, after meeting Giuseppe Prezzolini, he became involved with the periodical La Voce, to which (under the pseudonym Gino Bianchi) he contributed a large number of book reviews and pieces coloured by his religious sensibility. In 1915 he published Resultanze, a satirical "biography" of Gino Bianchi which presents his life as one long exercise in bureaucracy, and which reflects Jahier's experiences in public administration.

During World War I he was a volunteer and contributed to the trench newspaper L'Astico. Afterwards he published a number of works, but largely ceased publishing in the 1920s as a result of the rise of Fascism, returning triumphantly after the liberation, when he received many honours.

His poetry, with its heavy Biblical overtones, is comparable to that of Paul Claudel (which he translated into Italian), and contrasts with most Novecento work. However, it has been criticised for excessive political and moralistic content. His best-known poem is entitled simply Ragazzo ("Boy"). His translations are from English, French, and even (indirectly) Chinese.

He died in Florence. He was married to Elena Rochot and had one daughter.

== Bibliography ==
- Piero Jahier on Enciclopedia Treccani
- Piero Jahier, Ragazzo, con bibliografia degli scritti di P. Jahier, edizione critica a cura di F. Pastorelli, Perugia, Morlacchi, 2016.
