= Corrado Pavolini =

Italian writer (1898–1980)

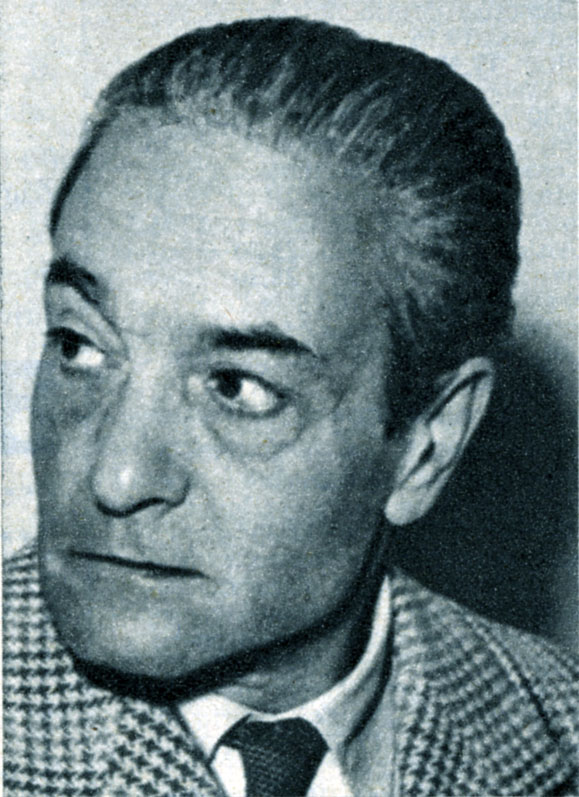
- Pavolini in 1954
- Born: 8 January 1898; Florence, Tuscany, Italy
- Died: 10 April 1980 (aged 82); Cortona, Tuscany, Italy
- Occupations: Writer, journalist
- Years active: 1939–1952 (film)

Corrado Pavolini (8 January 1898 – 10 April 1980) was an Italian writer identified with the futurist movement. He was the brother of the Fascist politician Alessandro Pavolini. Corrado served as the literary editor of the Rome-based Fascist daily newspaper Il Tevere.

== Selected filmography ==
- The Iron Crown (1941)
- A Pistol Shot (1942)
- Men of the Mountain (1943)
- Flying Squadron (1949)
- The Crossroads (1951)
- The Mistress of Treves (1952)

== Bibliography ==
- Liehm, Mira. Passion and Defiance: Film in Italy from 1942 to the Present. University of California Press, 1984.
