= Dino Campana =

Italian poet

- Born: Dino Carlo Giuseppe Campana; 20 August 1885; Marradi, Italy
- Died: 1 March 1932 (aged 46); Scandicci, Italy
- Occupation: Poet

Signature
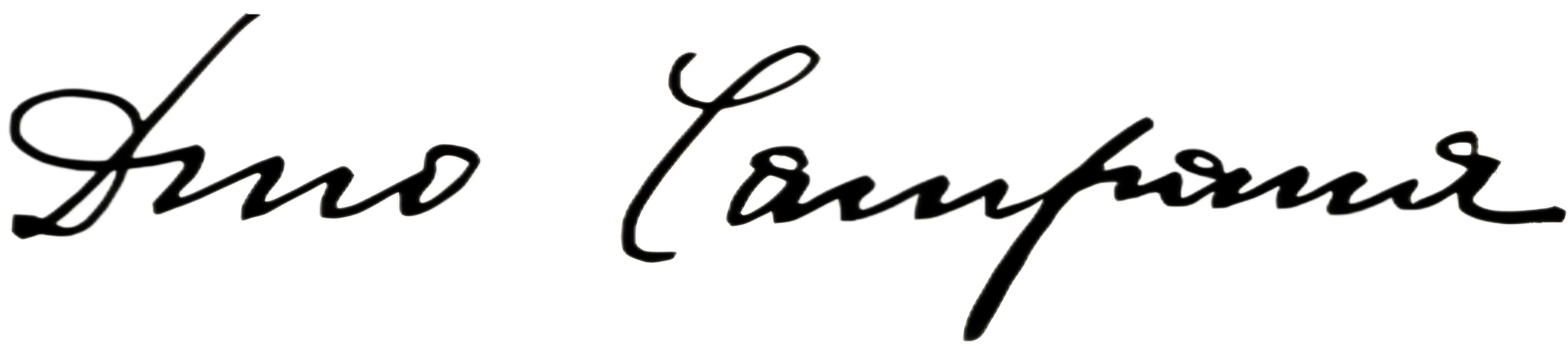

Dino Campana (20 August 1885 – 1 March 1932) was an Italian visionary poet. His fame rests on his only published book of poetry, the Canti Orfici ("Orphic Songs"), as well as his wild and erratic personality, including his ill-fated love affair with Sibilla Aleramo. He is often seen as an Italian example of a poète maudit.

== Life ==
Campana was born near Faenza in the small town of Marradi, which is found in the Apennines along the border between the regions of Emilia-Romagna and Tuscany. His father Giovanni, who was always affectionate and understanding with Dino, was an elementary school principal, and forthright member of the community, but had a weak and neurotic character. His mother, Fanny Luti, came from a wealthy family but was an eccentric and compulsive woman, affected by mental illness. She would often wander the hills, forgetting about family duties, but was overly attached to Dino's brother Manlio, born in 1888. After his younger brother arrived, Dino was overlooked by his mother and had to fight for her affection.

In 1900, at approximately fifteen years of age, Campana was diagnosed with the first symptoms of nervous disturbances, was medicated and sent to an asylum. This did not, however, prevent him from completing most of his schooling. He completed his elementary education in Marradi - his third, fourth and fifth gymnasium years at the Salesiani di Faenza. Afterwards, he began the lyceum at the Liceo Torricelli in Faenza and then in Carmagnola near Turin where he earned his high school diploma in July 1903. When he returned to Marradi his nervous condition worsened and he suffered frequent mood swings - due to the difficult relationship with his family (especially his mother) and the town. At the age of 18, in the autumn of 1903 he enrolled in the faculty of chemistry at the University of Bologna. In 1905, after being denied entry into the military as an officer in Ravenna, Dino enrolled in faculty of pharmaceutical chemistry in Florence, but after only a few months he returned to Bologna. Some of his first poetic work would be written here, and later included in Orphic Songs. Campana did not finish university and had a difficult time finding his true calling.

=== Journeys ===
Campana had an irrepressible desire to escape and dedicate himself to a life of vagrancy, which he accomplished by undertaking various jobs. The first reaction of his family, his town, and the public authorities was to consider Campana's strange behavior and travels to foreign countries as an obvious signs of madness. He was judged with suspicion both because his physical traits were considered too German, and due to the vigorous way he discussed poetry and philosophy. Following his journeys, the police (in agreement with the psychiatric practices of the time and the uncertainty of his family), admitted him to a lunatic asylum, at the age of 21.

Between May and July 1906, Campana made a first trip to Switzerland and France, which ended with his arrest in Bardonecchia and his admission to the mental asylum in Imola. In 1907, not knowing what to do about their son's madness, Campana's parents sent him to stay in Latin America with a family of Italian immigrants. This was not exactly an autonomous journey for the poet, who would not have been able to obtain a passport for the new world by himself, since he was a known ‘madman’ and in fact, his family had to apply for his passport and organise the trip. Campana left out of fear of being sent back to the asylum. Campana's parents also supported the move to send him to America, in the hope that it would help him recover, but it seems that the passport was valid only for arrival - likely an attempt to get rid of him, since living with Campana had become unbearable, at that point. It seems that his mother had come to believe that her son was the Antichrist.

His travels in America represent a particularly obscure and unknown point in Campana's biography: there are those who see him as ‘the poet of two worlds’, while others instead claim that Campana did not even travel to the continent. There are also different opinions about possible dates of travel and the route home. The most credible hypothesis is that he left in the autumn of 1907 from Genova, and wandered around Argentina until the spring of 1909, when he returned to Marradi, and was subsequently arrested. After a short intermission at San Salvi in Florence, he left for Belgium, but was arrested again in Brussels, and was interned in a ‘maison de santé’ in Tournai at the start of 1910. After asking his family for help, he was sent back to Marradi and lived through a quieter period, likely re-enrolling in university.

=== Canti Orfici ===
To the spectral garden to the silenced laurel

With green garlands
To autumnal earth
A last goodbye!
On the harsh barren
Reddened hillsides in the waning sun
Life in the distance
Its raucous cries merged screams:
Screams to the dying sun

That stains the flowerbeds with blood.

In its original form, Campana's only book of poetry contained poems composed between 1906 and 1913. In 1913 Campana went to Florence, to meet with Lacerba magazine associates Giovanni Papini and poet/painter Ardengo Soffici (his distant relative), to deliver his manuscript for publication, entitled "The longest day". It was not taken into account and the manuscript was lost, only to be found in 1971, after the death of Soffici, among his papers in the house of Poggio a Caiano (probably in the same place where it had been abandoned and forgotten). After a few months of waiting Campana travelled from Marradi to Florence to recover his manuscript. Papini did not have it and sent him to Soffici who denied that he ever had the booklet. Campana, whose mind was already frail, became angry and despondent, for he had delivered, trustingly, the only copy he had. His continual pleading only won him the contempt and indifference of the cultural milieu that revolved around the 'red shirts' of the Caffè Giubbe Rosse. Finally, exasperated, Campana threatened to come with a knife to take justice from the 'infamous' Soffici and his associates, whom he called 'sciacalli' (jackals).

In the winter of 1914, convinced he could no longer recover the manuscript, Campana decided to rewrite everything, relying on memory and his sketches. In a few days, working at night and at the cost of huge mental effort, he managed to rewrite the poetry, albeit with modifications and additions. In the spring of 1914, with the help of a local printer of religious tracts, Campana was finally able to self-publish the collection 'Orphic Songs' at his own expense, the title a reference to the mythic figure of Orpheus, the first of poet-musicians. The first edition consisted of around 500 copies (originally meant to be 1,000). 44 copies were sold on subscription and Campana attempted, with marginal success, to sell the remainder of his portion of the run (the printer had taken half the books as partial printing payment) himself at cafes in Florence.

The text is an autobiographical journey from Marradi through Faenza, Bologna, Genova, Argentina and back to Genoa. Paralleling the actual physical journey is a spiritual and mystical voyage undertaken by Campana in search of The Longest Day of Genoa (il più lungo giorno di Genova)- his concept of an eternal moment (l'eterno presente) outside of normal space-time in which everything and everywhere exists simultaneously. This concept is not explicitly defined in the text, which is less expository or didactic than incantatory in nature. Indeed, it has been left to his critics to extrapolate much of the underlying theory in Campana's work.

An erratic autodidact, Campana taught himself functional French, German and English- enough to read the Symbolists and Whitman in the original languages. The text is subtitled, in German, The Tragedy of the Last German in Italy and is dedicated to Kaiser William II. Campana ended his book with a faultily remembered quotation in English from Leaves of Grass: “They were all torn and cover'd with the boy's blood”.

The original manuscript was found amongst Soffici's belongings in 1971. This find demonstrated that not only had Campana rewritten the original text almost perfectly but had also nearly doubled it in size. This has led some to suggest that Campana had another copy of the manuscript from which he “reconstructed” the work.

=== Later years ===
In 1915, Campana again went travelling, without a fixed goal: passing through Turin, Domodossola, and then Florence. At the outbreak of the First World War, Campana the pacifist and neutralist, was exempt from military service, ostensibly because of physical health problems, but in reality he was known to be seriously mentally ill.

In 1916 the poet looked for employment in vain. He wrote to Emilio Cecchi and began a short correspondence with the author. At Livorno he met with the journalist Athos Gastone Banti, who wrote him a disparaging article in the journal "Il Telegrafo": this nearly ended in a duel. In the same year Campana met Sibilla Aleramo, the author of the novel Una donna, and began an intense and tumultuous relationship with her, which she ended at the start of 1917 after a brief encounter at Christmas 1916 in Marradi. Their letters and correspondence, published by Feltrinelli in 2000, are testimony to the relationship between Campana and Aleramo. This correspondence begins with a letter from Aleramo dated June 10, 1916, where the author expresses her admiration for "Canti Orfici", declaring the poems have 'enchanted and bedazzled' her. The letter was written while Sibilla was on holiday at the Villa La Topaia in Borgo San Lorenzo and Campana was in a critical condition at Firenzuola, recovering from a partial paralysis on his right side.

In 1918, Campana was once again admitted to a psychiatric hospital in Castel Pulci, in Scandicci (Florence), where he was to remain until his death. The only surviving accounts of this period of Campana's life are in the interviews with the psychiatrist Carlo Pariani, who confirmed the irrefutable diagnosis of Campana's mental state: Disorganised schizophrenia - an incurable and extremely serious form of schizophrenia. Dino Campana died, seemingly from sepsis on March 1, 1932. One theory is that the infection was caused by a barbed wire injury during an escape attempt.

The following day, the body of Campana was buried in the cemetery of San Colombano in Badia a Settimo, Scandicci. In 1942, on the behest of Piero Bargellini, the remains of the poet were given a more dignified burial and the body was transferred to the chapel below the bell tower of the Church of San Salvatore. During the Second World War, on August 4, 1944, the retreating German army blew up the bell tower, destroying the chapel. In 1946, following a ceremony attended by numerous Italian intellectuals, including Eugenio Montale, Alfonso Gatto, Carlo Bo, Ottone Rosai, Pratolini and others, the bones of the poet were placed inside the church of San Salvatore Badia a Settimo, where they remain today.

== Poetry ==
Campana's poetry is a new poetry in which sounds, colors and music are blended in a powerful vision. The line is undefined, an expressive articulation of monotony, but at the same time full of dramatic images of annihilation and purity. The title of Campana's only published work alludes to the Orphic Hymns, a literary genre developed in ancient Greece between the second and third century AD and characterized by a non-classical theogony. Also prayers to the gods (especially the god Phanes) are characterized by spells to prevent evil and misfortune.

=== Key Themes ===
One of the major themes of Campana, which is present at the beginning of the "Orphic Songs" in the early prose parts - "The Night", "Journey and Return" - is the obscurity between dream and wakefulness. Adjectives and adverbs return with the repetitive insistence of a dreamer's speech: a dream, however, that is interrupted by startling shifts in tone (as in the poem "The Skylight"). In the second part - the nocturne of "Genoa", all the basic mythic figures and scenes that will preoccupy Campana return: port cities, barbaric mother figures, enormous prostitutes, windy plains, the captive teenager. Even in his prose poems, the use of repetition, superlatives, and keywords, as well as the effect of resonance in prepositions, creates a strong scene.

=== Interpretation ===
In the fifteen years following his death at the end of World War II, and before, during the period of expressionism and futurism, the interpretation of Campana's poetry focused on the apparently uncontrolled depth of the word, hidden in a psychological state of hallucination and ruin. In his verse, where there is evidence of weak supervision and rough writing, there is - according to many critics - the vitality of the turn of the century avant-garde. Because of this, many different poets have been drawn to his poetry, such as Mario Luzi, Pier Paolo Pasolini, and Andrea Zanzotto.

== Selected works ==
The current edition of Dino Campana's collected writings is Dino Campana Opere (Milan: Editori Associati, 1989).

== Bibliography ==
- Dino Campana: Selected Works, trans. Cristina Viti (Survivors' Press, 2006) ISBN 978-1-874595-02-1
- Orphic Songs and Other Poems, trans. by Luigi Bonaffini (P. Lang, 1991)
- Orphic Songs, trans. Charles Wright (Oberlin College Press, 1984), ISBN 0-932440-17-7
- Orphic Songs Pocket Poets #54, trans. Lawrence Salomon (City Lights, 1998) ISBN 978-0-87286-340-8
