= Duilio Cambellotti =

Italian artist (1876–1960)

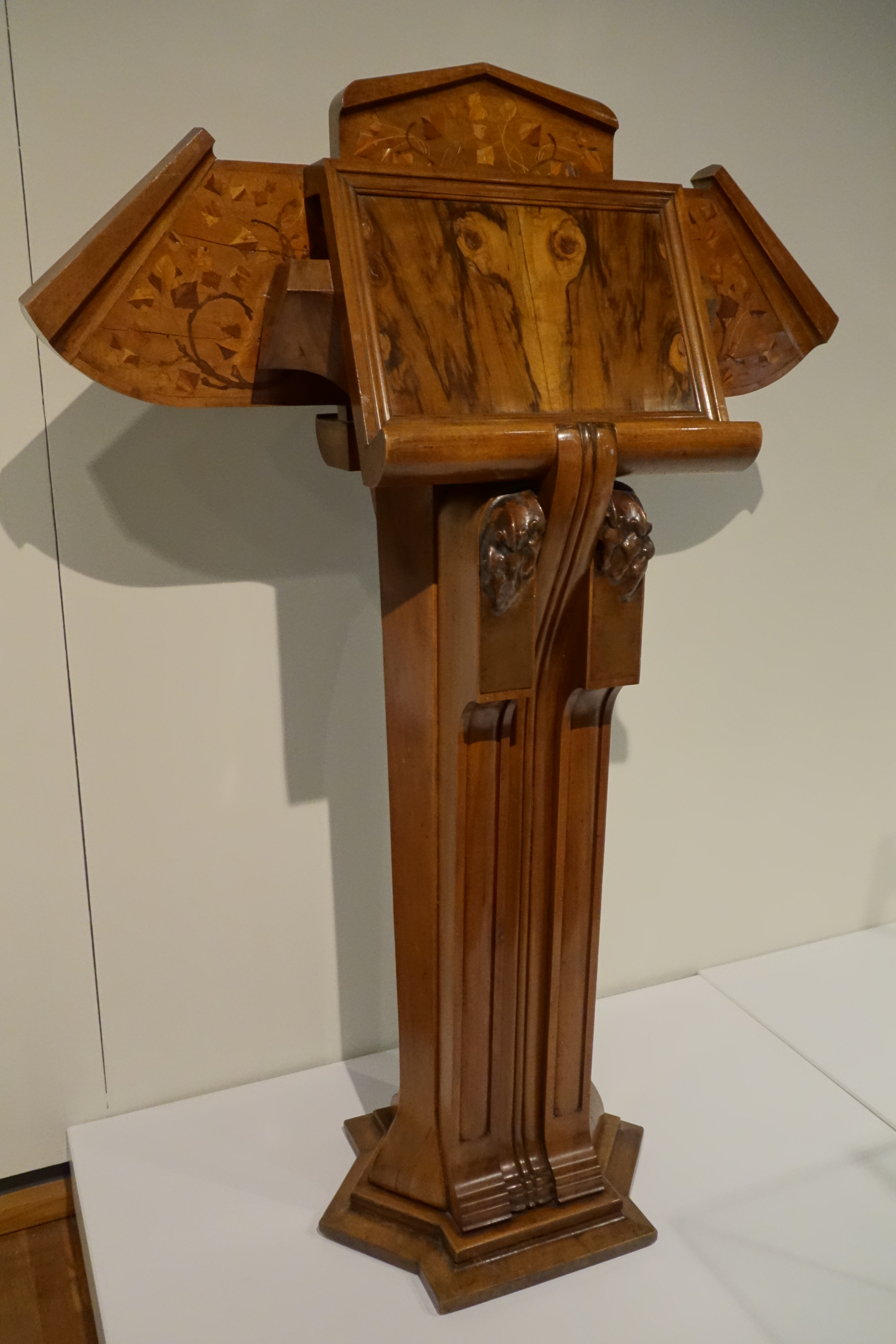
Walnut lectern by Cambellotti, 1923

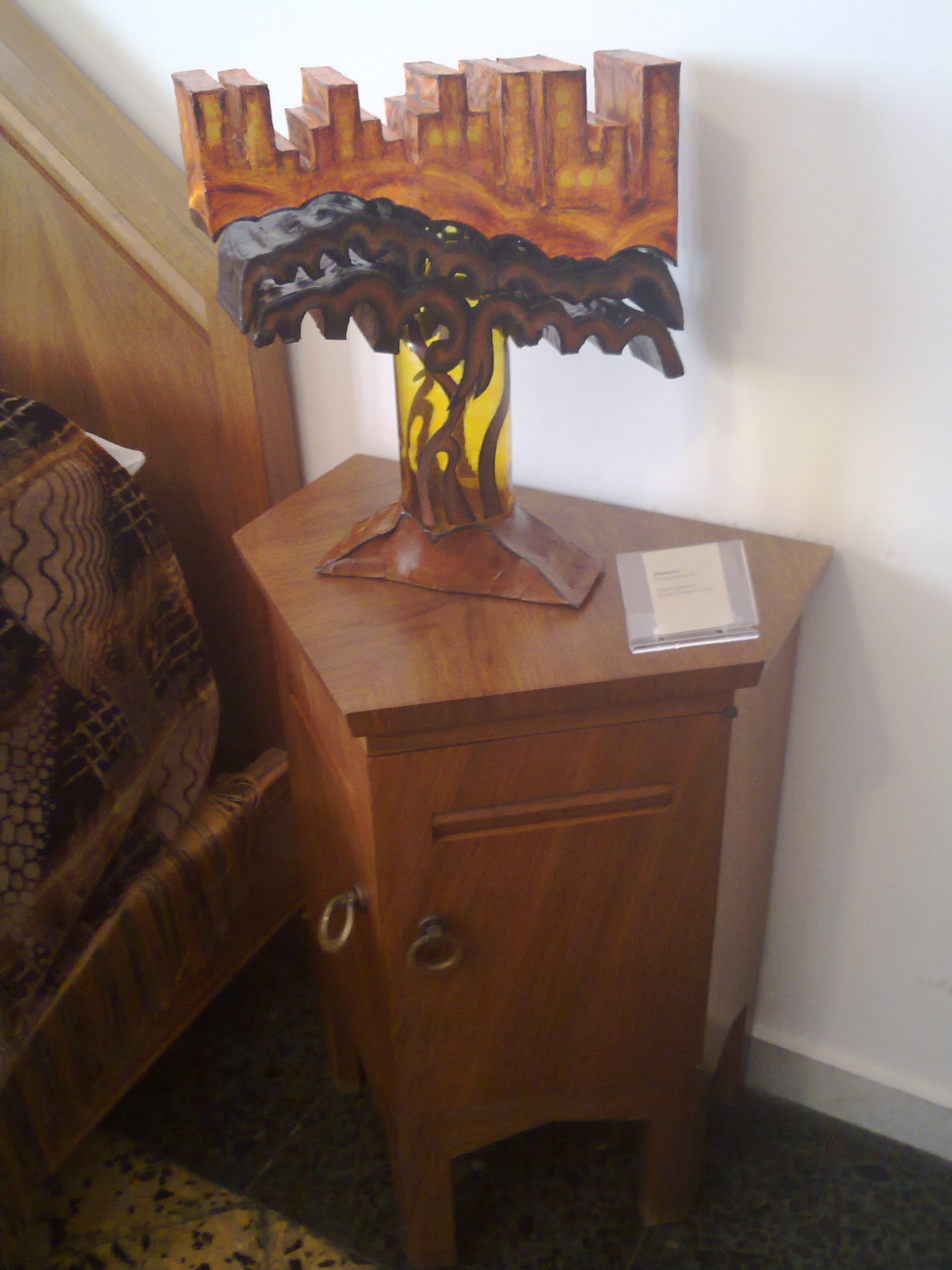
Nightstand and lamp by Cambellotti at the palace of the Apulian aqueduct at Bari

Duilio Cambellotti (10 May 1876 – 31 January 1960) was an Italian applied artist, illustrator, painter, sculptor and designer who played a role in the Arts & Crafts and Art Nouveau movements, and whose influence was social and political as well as aesthetic and artistic. He is recognized for his versatility across a spectrum of visual and design disciplines, and for his fidelity to agrarian themes.

Cambelotti was born in Rome. He received a diploma in accounting, but soon after receiving it he enrolled at an applied arts education program at the Industrial Artistic Museum in Rome, where he learned metal engraving. He also travelled to Naples, Athens and Istanbul to learn more. He was a proponent of the ideas of William Morris, and like Morris believed in the need to restore craftsmanship and quality to visual art, ornamentation and design. Cambellotti was also drawn to the visual vocabulary of Art Nouveau. He produced illustrations in that style for magazines, books and newspapers, and his furniture design (he was known for "Cambellotti lamps" and tables) is considered emblematic of Art Nouveau concepts. His gifts were recognized and his illustrations of Dante's Divine Comedy won the Alinari Prize in 1901 while he was still in his twenties. He discovered theater production and set design a few years later and quickly established a name for himself in that area as well. Yet another medium he that suited his sensibility and talents was stained glass, and from 1910 into the 1920s he exhibited notable stained glass works, in addition to being one of the organizers for the shows themselves.

Throughout his career he was aware of the social significance of decoration and, influenced by William Morris, he became a leading figure among artists who were intellectually and aesthetically trying maintain a connection with the organic immediacy of style found in traditional handmade objects and in traditional pictorial coherence, as opposed to the slick surfaces and machine-like images inspired by the Industrial Era. Cambellotti found much to admire in the theories of "rational beauty" advocated by Henry van de Velde, one of the founders of Art Nouveau in Belgium, but at the same time the Italian artist remained loyal to agrarian motifs, and to a non-anthropotechnic, undisrupted relationship with natural forms. The most frequent motif in his works is an ear of corn. He is classed along with Vittorio Grassi (1878–1958) as a leading proponent of the Scuola Romana (as a branch of Art Nouveau), and he steadfastly celebrated the "heroic atmosphere" of the peasant culture over the decadence of cities. Duilio Cambellotti died in Rome on 31 January 1960.

The life of Duilio Cambellotti spanned revolutions introduced by the Industrial Era and automation, which were accompanied by the emergence of modern aesthetics, the rise and fall of fascism in Italy, and more; all these changes are reflected in his entire oeuvre in some way. Cambellotti was interested in his home city of Rome not only via the agricultural world which supported it from its beginnings, but also in its spiritual and mythographic history. He had mastered the traditional medium of tempera and he created memorable historical and mythological paintings using it—the Roman Legends series, as well as the original tempera works from which the posters of the Greek Theater in Syracuse were printed—and such landmark achievements are still exhibited in prominent galleries (for example the Galleria Sperone Westwater in Lugano, Dec 2-13 - Jan 2014). The most complete expression of Cambellotti's mature architectural and interior design style is to be found in the Palazzo dell'Acquedotto ("The Water Museum") in the city of Bari, capital of the Apulia region of Italy. There is also a Duilio Cambellotti Museum in the city of Latina, located about 40 mi. south of Rome.
