= Antonio Baldini =

Italian writer

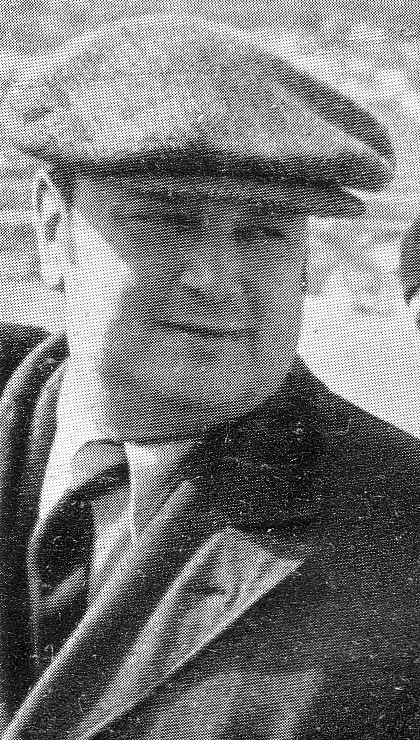
- 1937
- Born: Antonio Bismarck Baldini; 10 October 1889; Rome, Kingdom of Italy
- Died: 6 November 1962 (aged 73); Rome, Republic of Italy
- Education: Sapienza University of Rome
- Occupations: journalist Literary critic War correspondent Opinion journalist author
- Spouse: Elvira Cecchi (1895–1970)
- Children: 1. Gabriele (1919–1969); 2. Barberina
- Parents: Count Gabriele Baldini (1860–1916) (father); Sofia Alkaique (1861–1929) (mother)

Antonio Baldini (10 October 1889 – 6 November 1962) was an Italian journalist, literary critic and writer.

Institutions renamed in celebration and commemoration of Baldini include, slightly unusually, a large public library in Rome, the "Biblioteca statale Antonio Baldini".

== Biography ==
=== Provenance and early years ===
Antonio Baldini was born in Rome. Count Gabriele Baldini (1860–1916), his father, was a minor aristocrat, originally from Santarcangelo in Romagna, and employed for many years by the Ministry for Public Works, notably in connection with the administration of contracts for railway development. His mother, born Sofia Alkaique (1861-1929), came from Livorno (Tuscany), possibly having been born into an immigrant family. Baldini's father was a passionate admirer of Chancellor Bismarck, and the middle name "Bismarck" – subsequently abandoned – is included in the attribution in respect of several of Bandini's early magazine contributions, as well as being referenced with evident irony by subsequent commentators.

He attended a number of schools in Rome, including the prestigious Ennio Quirino Visconti Liceo Ginnasio. He then enrolled to study literature at the Sapienza University of Rome, although he would not complete his studies there and graduate until 1916. By that time he already had become a journalist.

=== Literary scholar and journalist ===
Baldini's graduation dissertation concerned Ariosto, whose work, along with that of Carducci, he had idolised since his school days.

Meanwhile, he had become part of a circle of literary scholars including Emilio Cecchi, Vincenzo Cardarelli, Riccardo Bacchelli and Aldo Palazzeschi. During the early years of the twentieth century these men, together, formed the nucleus of a cultural revival, mainly centred around various avant-garde magazines and journals, of which probably the best known was and is "La Voce*, published in Florence between 1908 and 1916. Baldini's first published work appeared in 1912 in another literary journal, "Lirica", founded earlier that same year by Arturo Onofri and Umberto Fracchia. These early contributions combined semi-autobiographical confessional aspects ("fatto personale") with a mix of fantasy, reverie and humour. In 1914 they were combined into a single slim volume entitled "Pazienze e impazienze del Maestro Pastoso" (loosely, "Patience and impatience of Mr. Pastry").

In 1915 Baldini became a regular contributor to the Italian right-of-centre irridentist newspaper L'Idea Nazionale which had recently switched from weekly to daily publication. Baldini's articles appeared on the third page, which by tradition in Italian newspapers was less political than the outer pages and a more focused on literature and other arts-related topics. His contributions consisted of a series of "passeggiate" (literally, "gentle recreational walks, seldom undertaken alone, and generally involving mutually agreeable conversation) or "vedute romane" ("vistas of Rome"). Work for L'Idea Nazionale brought Baldini to the notice of a far wider readership. Baldini was a member of the editorial board of the Rome-based magazine La Ronda between 1919 and 1922.

=== War ===
After Italy entered World War I in May 1915, Baldini joined the army during the summer of 1915, initially as a private soldier, but he was quickly promoted to the rank of an infantry officer. On 3 November 1915 he was badly wounded in the battle for Monte San Michele, in the mountains inland to the north-west of Trieste. His involvement earned him a Silver Medal for Military Valo(u)r. He was then sent back to Rome to recover.

Towards the end of 1916 Baldini returned to the frontline. Still not physically able to fight, he instead served as an "inviato speciale" – in this case, in effect, a war correspondent. His contributions appeared, as before, in the Rome-based L'Idea Nazionale, and now also in L'Illustrazione Italiana, a weekly illustrated magazine produced in Milan. For L'Illustrazione Italiana he also sent back from the frontline a series of "dialoghetti" and "storielle" (short dialogues and stories) under the pseudonym "Gatto Lupesco" (loosely, "Wolf-Cat") which enabled him to pull together, in 1918, another book, "Nostro purgatorio", using his experiences as a war correspondent.

=== Peace? ===
By the end of 1918 Antonio Baldini was back in Rome, newly married to Elvira Cecchi (1895–1970). They would become the parents of two children.

Baldini teamed up in 1919 with a number of other journalist-critics, most of whom had been his university contemporaries, to found a new monthly literary review magazine, La Ronda, which was published in Rome between 1919 and 1923. His co-founders included Emilio Cecchi, Vincenzo Cardarelli, Riccardo Bacchelli and Bruno Barilli. In a period of post-war confusion and uncertainty, La Ronda was intended to promote a "return" to the classics. He continued, in addition, to work with L'Illustrazione Italiana, contributing more "vedute e chronache romane" ("vistas and chronicles of Rome"). Baldini's contributions also appeared, as they had before Italy became engaged in the war-time fighting, in L'Idea Nazionale, consisting of reviews, critical profiles and literary moralisings in varying proportions, but always crisp and razor sharp in their syntax and arguments. A compilation of some of these works was published in two volumes in 1920, entitled respectively "Umori di gioventù" and "Salti di gomitolo". Some selections from these works have also been issued in subsequent publications. There were also fictional pieces, such as the "Fables of Michelaccio" which appeared in instalments starting in 1920, and was then reissued, heavily reworked, as a single volume, in 1924.

Between 1920 and 1922 Baldini was abroad for much of the time, employed as private secretary to General De Marinis, who had been sent to command the Inter-allied governance and plebiscite commission in Upper Silesia. His duties did not preclude continuing with his contributions to the Italian press, and the entire experience was a source of inspiration and insight for future writings.

=== 1924–1943 ===
During the early 1920s Baldini expanded his readership, writing for a number of mainstream middle-class newspapers and respected literary journals, such as the Corriere Italiano, Il Resto del Carlino, I Libri del giorno, and Galleria. In 1924 there was an abrupt change of strategy: from that year he wrote almost exclusively for Corriere della Sera. He had been recruited by managing editor Luigi Albertini, under whose direction Corriere della Sera had already become Italy's most widely read newspaper. Over the next few years Baldini was intensely busy, both as a reporter and as a literary journalist. His writing passed the so-called Elzeviro test, at once erudite, sharply to the point, rich and free in its use of vocabulary, at once elegant and derogatory, and yet never deviating very far from a conversational genre. To his admirers, Baldini's writing style was pleasingly impossible to replicate.

Much of the inspiration for Baldini's writing was drawn from his own imagination, often operating in tandem with his much vaunted "love for Rome". He could seem almost proprietorial in sharing his affection for this ""fatto personale", the city of his birth. He also found ideas for his writing in his own reading – or re-reading – from the classics of Italian literature, or through meetings and conversations with artists and writers (who generally were also his friends). He took themes from things he had seen and remembered during his travels, both in obscure recesses of Italy and abroad. He was posted by Corriere della Sera to work as a correspondent in Paris during 1929/30 and, still during 1930 in Ankara. He found and shared food for thought in the marginalia of news stories and unexpected local customs, such as those referenced in a series of articles appeared between 1926 and 1929 in "La Tribuna-L'Idea nazionale" (the title of the former "L'Idea Nazionale", following an acquisition and merger at the end of 1925) using the pseudonym "Melafumo". (Over time "Melafumo" became more than a mere pseudonym emerging as a "younger brother" to "Michelaccio", Baldini's pseudonymous narrator of fiction from earlier works.) Between 1928 and 1943, increasingly, Baldini's journalistic work was giving birth to a succession of books, starting with "La dolce calamita" (1929: retitled and re-issued in 1940 as "Beato fra le donne" / "Blessed between women") and "Amici allo spiedo" (1932: retitled, expanded and re-issued in 1942 as "Buoni incontri d'Italia").

It was in this context that in June 1931 Baldini became editor-in-chief at the prestigious monthly literary journal "Nuova Antologia", later promoted to the status of literary editor. He was appointed by Luigi Federzoni, the publication's long-standing director between 1931 and 1943. "Nuova Antologia" had been founded in 1866, and while it retained much of its reputation, there was a widespread view among a younger generation of scholars that it had failed to recover its momentum during the confused years following the end of World War I, carefully distancing itself from the lively political debate that was a feature of the early 1920s. The publication's director, Luigi Federzoni was a government insider. Baldini sustained the magazine's apolitical stance, to the point that when, following the fall of fascism in 1943, Federzoni was obliged to step aside from the magazine's directorship, Baldini briefly took his place. Nevertheless, in Mussolini's Italy "Nuova Antologia" was widely seen as part of the nation's literary establishment, and views of his role were and have remained polarised. In the view of admirers, Baldini introduced a new dynamic to a magazine which before his arrival had been in sharp decline. "Nuova Antologia" became a safe space where young writers could collaborate fearlessly with famous writers, without being pressured to follow fashionable trends or align themselves with some "literary school". In matters concerning literature, there was room for free expression and judgement to an extent and in a manner which had become unusual elsewhere.

Baldini won the "Mussolini Literature Prize" in 1937. Two years later, in 1939, Baldini was nominated for and accepted membership in the Royal Academy.

=== After fascism ===
By January 1945 Baldini had resurfaced and was back at the "Nuova Antologia", where he now served as editor-in-chief and literary director nearly till the end of his life. He resumed his close collaboration with Corriere della Sera, notably with his "Tastiera" ("Keyboard") column, which alternated between the erudite and the whimsical. He also resurrected "Melafumo", using his alter ego to reprise a series of commentaries and confessions for radio audiences, switching back and forth between melancholy memories and contemporary ironies.

He wrote more book as well: "Se rinasco..." (1944), "Fine Ottocento" (1947), "Melafumo" (1950), "Quel caro magon di Lucia" (1956). Meanwhile, during 1950 Baldini was appointed president of the team responsible for organising the 6th "Rome Quadriennale" (major art exhibition), to be held between December 1951 and March 1952 at the Exhibitions Palace in central Rome. It was a position which imposed certain unwelcome constraints in terms of his personal art purchases, and one which he would retain in respect of subsequent Quadrienali for more than a decade. In 1953 he accepted a corresponding membership of the prestigious Accademia dei Lincei. In 1954 he was involved, along with Enrico Gianeri, Mario Sertoli and Tem Agostini, in the launch of another review magazine, "Cronache d'altri tempi" ("Chronicles of former times"). He won the Feltrinelli Literature Prize, worth at that time 5 million lire, in 1957. By this time, however, conscious of his declining health, he had for some years been cutting down on his workload. Baldini had been diagnosed with serious heart disease during or before 1952. He nevertheless undertook several apparently work related foreign visits during his final years, visiting Greece in 1956, Spain in 1958 and England in 1961. His final heart attack took place the next year: Antonio Baldini died in Rome on 6 November 1962.

== The writer ==
Many of the friends and admirers who wrote about Baldini after his death were journalists and commentators: many sources focus on Baldini's activities as a journalist. His parallel career as a writer of books and short stories is nevertheless an important complementary part of the overall picture. He made his debut as a writer of short stories in 1914 with "Pazienze e impazienze del Maestro Pastoso" (loosely, "Patience and impatience of Mr. Pastry"), which was a slim compilation of stories he had already published individually in appropriate literary journals.

More than many writers, Baldini displayed the essential elements of his personality in his writing from the outset. Some of the most joyous and powerful examples come in "Nostro Purgatorio", which remains one of the most important pieces of Italian war literature. It was not, however, Baldini's first published work. Almost certainly some of the "Vedute di Roma" ("vistas of Rome") were written earlier, and they display much of the same joyous idiosyncrasy for which Baldini would become known. Other early works, including "Maestro Pastoso", show the writer struggling to find his own voice, or more precisely trying to reconcile the tension between his lyrical-autobiographical leadings and the objective narrative form to which both critical convention and his own classical education drew him. To some extent it was the cold externally imposed realities of World War I, and his participation in it, that enforced some level of synthesis, and he learned to adapt his style more seamlessly than in his early works to the differing requirements of the subject matter. But the tension remained apparent throughout his career as a writer.

"Michelaccio", a semi-autobiographical short story of barely more than 100 pages, was published in 1924 not as part of a compilation but as a single volume. It was born out of a longing for the proverbial Roman indolence and the "sweetness of doing nothing" celebrated by ancient savants and popular philosophers through the ages. It also echoed the yearning for a beautiful fairy tale in the spirit of Orlando Furioso or Bertoldo, with a morally satisfactory denouement. It is the story of an existence, oscillating between fantasy and hard realities, whereby the protagonist experiments consciously with the most disparate range of experiences, at the end of which nothing very much had changed. The critic Giacinto Spagnoletti describes "Michelaccio" as the fruit of an effervescent fantasy, reflecting the good natured approach associated with Baldini's overall outlook on life. He sees the protagonist as a character drawn straight out of the Commedia dell'arte, but then filtered through Baldini's linguistic pastiche, redolent of the author's ancestral provenance in Romagna to the north, and of his Roman upbringing.

Qualities conspicuous in what might be termed Baldini's travel writing have also drawn plenty of comment over the years, mostly positive and enthusiastic. In his writing he displays rare harmonious blends of classical and modern prose, of the elevated and the robustly popular, of elegant and rudely unkempt: neologisms and dialect words are incorporated seamlessly and in most cases unnoticed by the reader. His use of full stops / periods reduced over the years, and the prose remained unfashionably light on other forms of punctuation, airy and whimsical but tightly connected in terms of underlying syntactical structure. This stylistic mastery was on display in "La vecchia del Bal Bullier" ("The old woman of the Bullier ballroom") and "Italia di Bonincontro" ("Italy of food encounters"), which – typically for Baldini – identifies an Italy to be loved like a beautiful woman, less for her history and more on account of her physical appearance. In the case of Italy, that drives a preference for the picturesque oddities of some of its out-of-the-way villages and towns, rather than the complex perspectives of the more iconic big cities.

== Output (selection) ==
- Pazienze e impazienze di Maestro Pastoso, Nalato, Rome, 1914
- Nostro Purgatorio. Fatti personali del tempo della guerra italiana 1915–1917, Treves, Milan, 1918
- Umori di gioventù, Vallecchi, Florence, 1920
- Salti di gomitolo (1920)
- Michelaccio, La Ronda, Roma, 1924
- La dolce calamita ovvero La donna di nessuno, L'Italiano, Bologna, 1929
- Amici allo spiedo, Vallecchi, Florence, 1932 (nuova edizione, Buoni incontri d'Italia, 1942)
- Ludovico della tranquillità, Zanichelli Editore, Bologna, 1933 (nuova edizione, Ariosto e dintorni, 1958)
- La vecchia del Bal Bullier, L'Italiano, Bologna, 1934
- Italia di Bonincontro, Sansoni, Florence, 1940
- Cattedra d'occasione, 1941
- Il Sor Pietro, Cosimo Papareschi e Tuttaditutti, Firenze, Le Monnier, 1941
- Rugantino, Bompiani, Milan, 1942
- Diagonale 1930 Parigi-Ankara. Note di viaggio, Arnoldo Mondadori Editore, Milan, 1943
- Se rinasco…, fatti personali, 1944
- Fine Ottocento. Carducci, Pascoli, D'Annunzio e minori, Le Monnier, Florence, 1947.
- Melafumo, Eri, Turin, 1950 (nuova edizione, Il Doppio Melafumo, 1957)
- Il doppio Melafumo, Eri, Turin, 1955
- "Quel caro magon di Lucia", microscopie manzoniane, 1956
- Nuovi Racconti italiani (con Luigi Silori), Nuova Accademia, Rome, 1963

Posthumously published

- Un sogno dentro l’altro, 1965 (a cura del figlio Gabriele)
- Le scale di servizio. Introduzione al libro e alla lettura, a cura di N. Vian, Milan and Naples, Ricciardi, 1971.
- Tastiera, 3 voll., 1978–80 (raccolta degli Elzeviro|elzeviri pubblicati sul «Corriere della Sera» a cura di N. Vian).
