= Amerigo Bartoli Natinguerra =

Italian painter

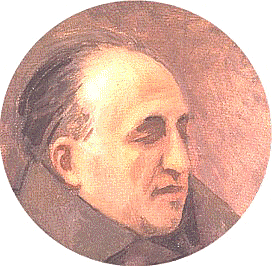
Amerigo Bartoli Natinguerra (1934)

Amerigo Bartoli Natinguerra (1890– 1971) was an Italian painter, caricaturist, and writer. He mainly painted vedute and landscapes, using both oil and water color in subdued earthy tones. He also painted still lifes and portraits.

Amerigo was born in Terni. As a young man he moved to Rome, where he became a pupil of Duilio Cambellotti and Giulio Aristide Sartorio. He displayed works at the 1915 Mostra della Secessione in Rome, and in 1921, at the Biennale di Roma. In 1922, he joined the gruppo di Valori Plastici, and painted compositions or great simplicity and warm colors, including Gli amici al caffè, which won an award at the 1930 Biennale of Venice. In 1927, Margherita Sarfatti presented his work at the Exhibition of Dieci artisti del Novecento Italiano, during the 93rd Exposition of Amatori e Cultori di Belle arti.

Amerigo was an avid contributor of both columns and cartoons to publications such as "La Tribuna", "La Lettura", "Gazzetta del Popolo", "Quadrivio", "Omnibus", and "La Fiera Letteraria". From 1938 to 1960, he held a professorship of painting at the Academy of Fine Arts of Rome. He died in Rome.
