= Vincenzo Cardarelli =

Italian poet and journalist

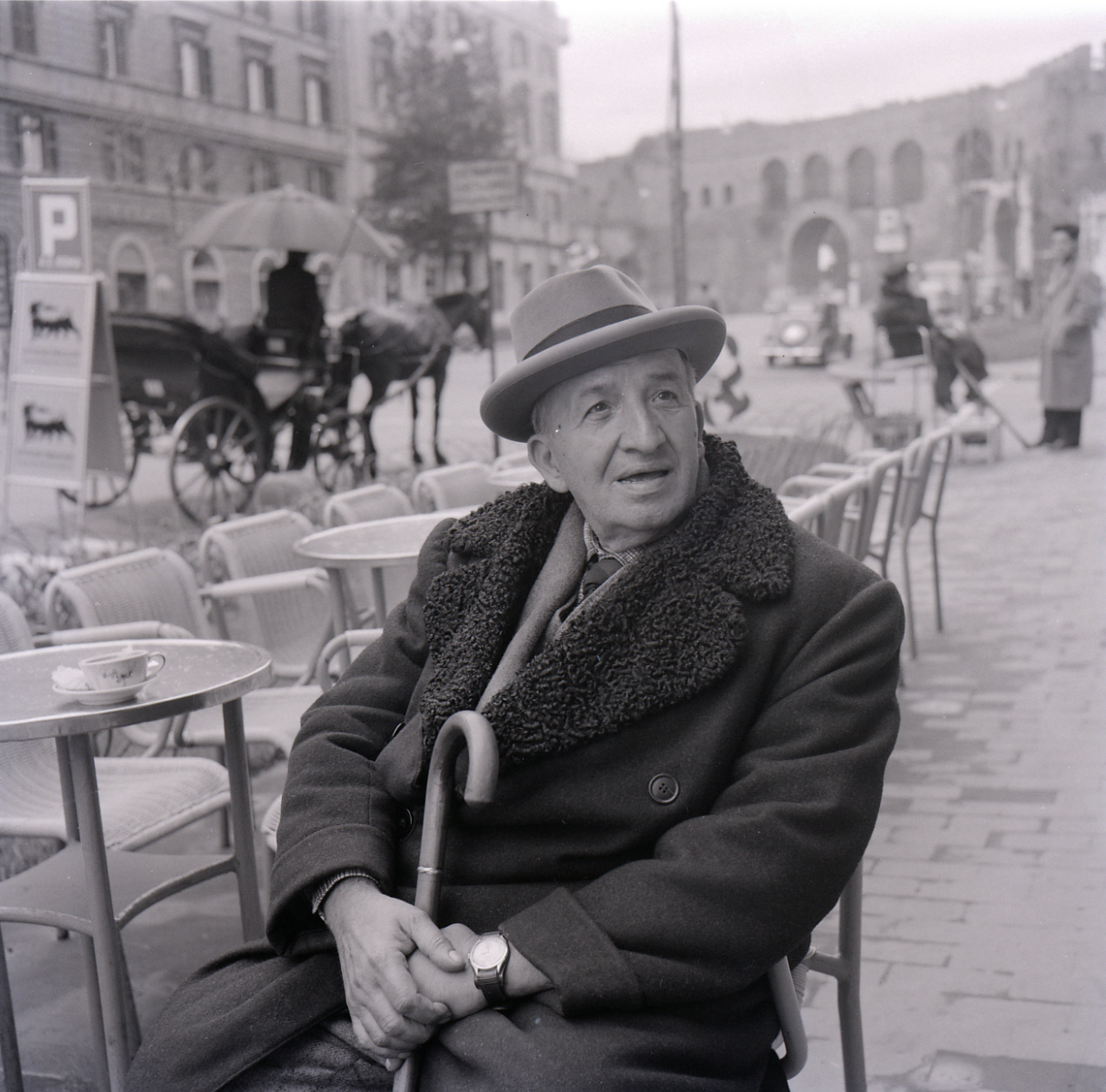
Vincenzo Cardarelli, photo by Paolo Monti, 1957

Vincenzo Cardarelli, pseudonym of Nazareno Caldarelli (1 May 1887 – 18 June 1959) was an Italian poet and a journalist.

Cardarelli was born in Corneto, Lazio, in a family of Marche origin. His father was Antonio Romagnoli. His studies were irregular and he applied to different jobs. In 1906, when he had moved to Rome, he began his career as a journalist.

Cardarelli published articles in the Bologna-based literary magazine La Raccolta between 1918 and 1919. He created, in 1919 with Riccardo Bacchelli and Emilio Cecchi, the prestigious review La Ronda (1919-1922). He was one of the contributors of the Fascist daily Il Tevere.

Carderelli won two literary awards, including the 1929 Premio Bagutta for Il Sole a picco and the 1948 Premio Strega for Villa Tarantola.

== Works ==
- Prologhi (1916)
- Viaggi nel tempo (1920)
- Terra genitrice (1924)
- Favole e memorie (1925)
- Il sole a picco (1929), Premio Bagutta winner
- Prologhi viaggi, favole (1929)
- Giorni in piena (1934)
- Poesie (Poetry) (1936)
- Il cielo sulle città (1939)
- Rimorsi (Remorse) (1944)
- Lettere non spedite (1946)
- Poesie nuove (New Poetry) (1946)
- Solitario in Arcadia (Alone in Arcadia) (1947)
- Villa Tarantola (1948), Premio Strega winner
- Poesie (Poetry) (1949)
- Opere complete (Complete Works) (1962)
- Invettiva ed altre poesie disperse (1964)
- Opere (Works) (a cura di Clelia Martignoni, Milano, 1981)
- Autunno, sei vecchio, rassegnati (1988)
- Gabbiani, a cura Mondadori (1998)
- Estate (2008)
