= Orsola Nemi =

20th-century Italian writer and translator

Orsola Nemi (born Flora Vezzani; 11 June 1903 – 8 February 1985) was an Italian writer and translator.

== Biography ==
As a girl, Nemi moved to La Spezia with her father, an infantry officer. He died on the Karst Plateau on October 15, 1915. At three years of age, Nemi fell ill with poliomyelitis. She survived but was marked by the disease for the rest of her life.

Henry Furst, a celebrated United States writer transferred to Italy to work for the New York Times. Nemi and he fell in love and were married. After meeting Furst, he helped to launch her literary career. Nemi met the editor Eugenio Montale, who published her poetry in the Letteratura review. From her publications, she was assigned to collaborate on the enormous Dizionario delle Opere e dei Personaggi. She also collaborated with writer Leo Longanesi and translated for him many French authors, including Alexis de Tocqueville, Honoré de Balzac, and one work by Gustave Flaubert.

Nemi's career stretched from the 1930s to the 1980s. She wrote novels, short stories, fables, essays, and prayers and wrote for publications like Gazzetta del Popolo, Il Messaggero, L'Osservatore Romano, Il Tempo, and Il Borghese. She also wrote for the theater: in 1961, she wrote Camicie Rosse to celebrate the centenary of the Proclamation of the Kingdom of Italy.

After the death of her husband in 1967, she composed Il meglio di Henry Furst in his honor. In 1972, Nemi wrote the pamphlet I Cristiani Dimezzati, in which she criticized the modernism of the Catholic church after the Second Vatican Council. In 1980, she finished a work she had begun with Furst: a biography of Catherine de' Medici.

== Name ==
Nemi's birthname was Flora Vezzani. Her pen name, Orsola Nemi, is derived from the day that her father died, October 15, 1915, which is dedicated to Sant'Orsola. The second half of her name is an abbreviation for the Latin word "Nemini" (lit. 'of no one'), to symbolize her shy and independent nature.

== Publications ==
=== Writing and editing ===
- Rococò, Milan, Bompiani, 1940
- Cronaca, Milan, Bompiani, 1942
- Nel paese di Gattafata, ed. Documento, 1944; Bompiani, 2017
- Lena e il Bombo, Milan, Rosa e Ballo, 1944
- Anime Disabitate, Roma Atlantica, 1945
- Maddalena della Palude, Milan, Longanesi, 1949
- Rotta a nord, Firenze, Vallecchi, 1955
- I Gioielli Rubati, Milan, Bompiani, 1958
- Il sarto stregato, Milan, Ceschina, 1960
- Camicie rosse, Milan, Edizioni del Borghese, 1961
- Le Signore Barabbino, Milan, Rizzoli, 1965
- Taccuino di una donna timida, Milan, Edizioni del Borghese, 1969
- Il tesoro delle Galline, Milan, I.P.L, 1970
- L'Astrologo distratto, Rome, ed. Volpe, 1971
- I Cristiani Dimezzati, Milan, Rusconi, 1972
- Caterina Dè Medici, Milan, Rusconi, 1980
- Henry Furst, Il meglio di Henry Furst, edited by Orsola Nemi, preface by Mario Soldati, introduction by Ernst Jünger, Milan, Longanesi, 1970

=== Translations ===
- Gustave Flaubert, L'educazione sentimentale, Milan-Rome, Rizzoli, 1942
- Scandali e personaggi: scelta dalle memorie di Saint-Simon, 2 vol., Rome, Documento Libraio Editore, 1944
- John Reed, Dieci giorni che fecero tremare il mondo, Milano, Longanesi, 1946
- Gustave Flaubert, Bouvard e Pécuchet, Collana La Gaja Scienza n.5, Milano, Longanesi, 1946
- Ben Hecht, Il diavolo a New York, Collana La Gaja Scienza n.12, Milan, Longanesi, 1947
- Evelyn Waugh, Sempre più bandiere, Milan, Bompiani, 1949
- Arthur Rimbaud, Una stagione all'inferno, Collana Piccola Biblioteca, Milan, Longanesi, 1951
- Herman Melville, Benito Cereno ed altri racconti, translated by O. Nemi and Henry Furst, Collana Piccola Biblioteca n. 32–34, Milan, Longanesi, 1951
- Guy de Maupassant, Bel-Ami, BUR n.936, Milan, Rizzoli, 1955
- Il Meglio di Baudelaire, preface by Henry Furst, Milan, Longanesi, 1955.
- Mac Hyman, Tempi brutti per i sergenti, Milan, Bompiani, 195
- Moses I. Finley, Il mondo di Odisseo, translation by Henry Furst and Orsola Nemi, Bologna, Cappelli, 1956
- Albert Bessières, S. J., Vita di Gesù, Collana universale n.16/17, Bologna, Cappelli, 1958
- Edmond and Jules de Goncourt, I Pittori francesi del XVIII secolo, Collana I Marmi n.14, Milan, Longanesi, 1959
- Gustave Flaubert, Romanzi e Racconti (1869-1880) · Teatro, edited by Renato Prinzhofer and Silvio Giovaninetti, Milan, Mursia, 1961 [translation of La tentazione di Sant'Antonio and Tre racconti]
- Vintilă Horia, Dio è nato in esilio: Diario di Ovidio a Tomi, Milano, Edizioni Il Borghese, 1961
- Graham Greene, Inedito, Milano, Longanesi, 1962
- Vintila Horia, La settima lettera, Milano, Edizioni Il Borghese, 1965
- Michel de Saint Pierre, I nuovi preti, Milano, Edizioni Il Borghese, 1965
- Edward Gibbon, Viaggio in Europa, Collana Vecchia Europa e nuova, Milano, Edizioni Il Borghese, 1965
- Robert Brasillach, I sette colori, Milano, Edizioni Il Borghese, 1966
- Dorothy M. Johnson, Tomahawk, Prefazione di Jack Schaefer, Collezione La ginestra n.125, Milano, Longanesi, 1972
- Pearl S. Buck, La casa dei fiori, Milano, BUR Rizzoli, 1972
