= Bruno Caruso =

Italian artist (1927–2018)

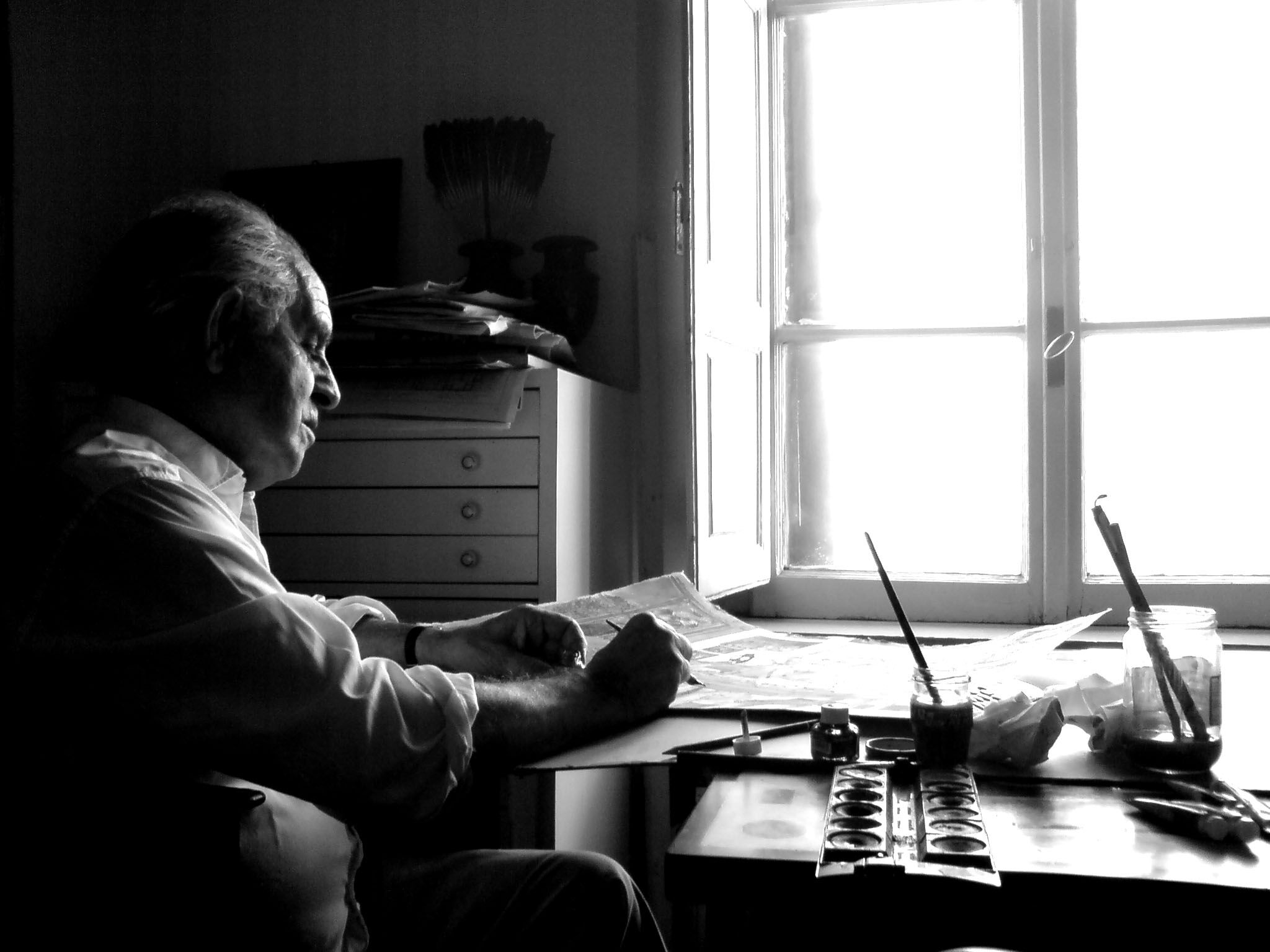
- Caruso painting at his studio in Rome, 2008
- Born: 8 August 1927; Palermo, Italy
- Died: 4 November 2018 (aged 91); Rome, Italy
- Known for: Painting, Etching, Graphic Design, Illustration and Writing
- Movement: Italian Neorealism, Social Realism
- Spouse: Vivi Maggio
- Partner: Lidia Olivetti
- Awards: Gold Medal, Italian Medal of Merit for Culture and Art, Commander, Order of Merit of the Italian Republic
- Elected: Accademia di San Luca
- Patrons: Helena Rubenstein, Arthur Jeffress, Irene Brin
- Website: bruno-caruso.com

Bruno Caruso (Italian: [ˈbruːno kaˈruːzo]; 8 August 1927 – 4 November 2018) was an Italian artist, graphic designer and writer. He spent much of his adult life working in Rome.

Caruso's work focused on the moral, political and ethical flaws of the 20th Century. He fought against the influence of Sicilian Mafia in Italian politics, protested against the Vietnam War, campaigned against the use of straitjackets in psychiatric wards, and championed the rights of Sicilian farmers in their battle for land ownership in the aftermath of World War II.

Over the course of his career, he created more than 25 collections of drawings, founded celebrated Sicilian cultural magazines, Sicilia and Ciclope, and illustrated works by Machiavelli, Kafka, Leonardo Sciascia, Giovanni Arpino and Giuseppe Ungaretti amongst many others.

Caruso's work has ended up in the collections of notable 20th-century patrons of the arts, including Helena Rubenstein, Arthur Jeffress and Irene Brin. In 1993 he was designated a 'commander' of the Order of Merit of the Italian Republic, and in 2001 he received the Gold Medal of Merit for Culture and Art from the president of Italy. He was a member of the prestigious Accademia di San Luca.

== Life and works ==
=== Early life and education (1927–1948) ===
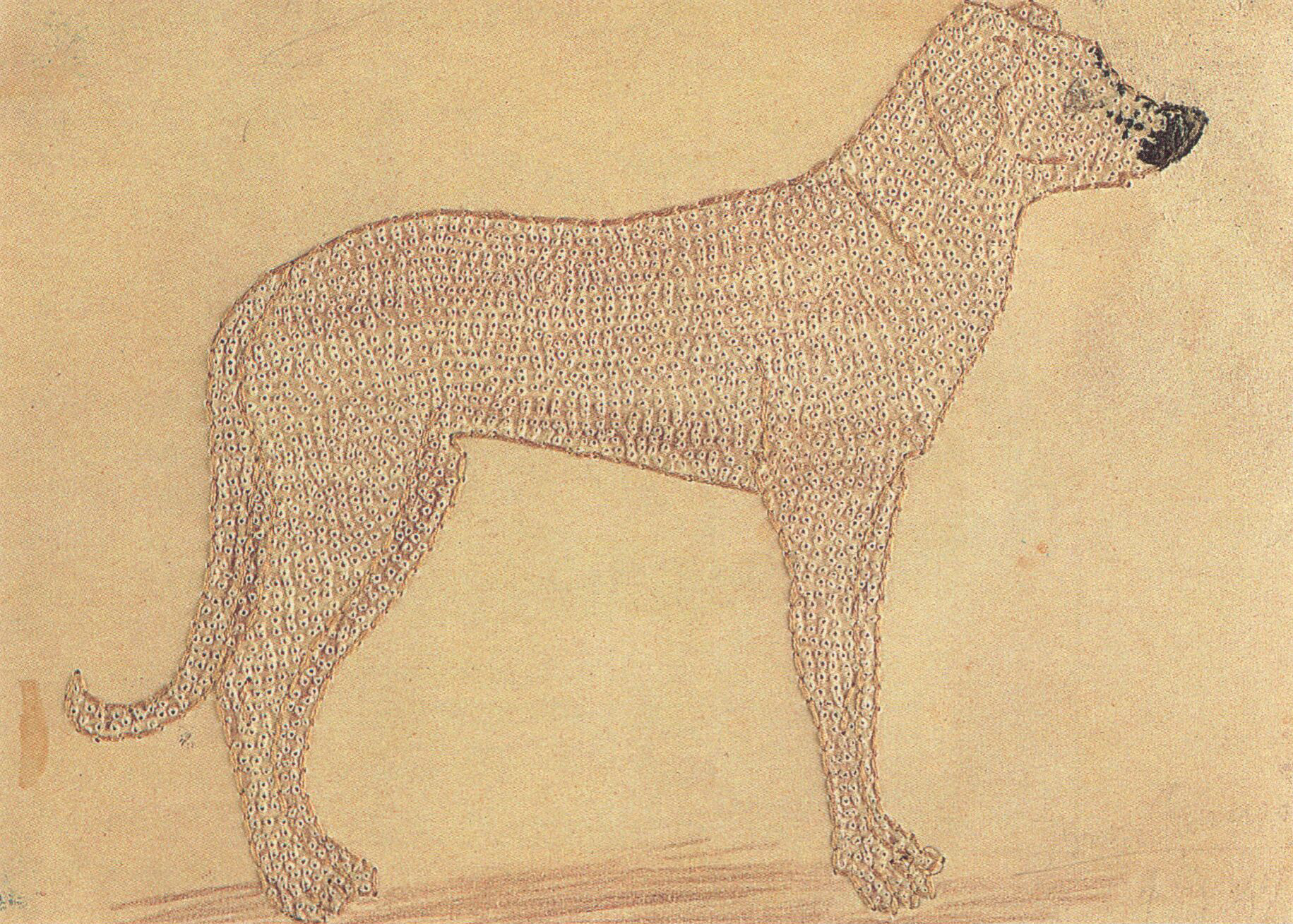
Il Cane/The Dog (1932) Ink Drawing textured with Needlepoint

Bruno Caruso was born in Palermo, on 8 August 1927, to Giuseppe Caruso and Maria Cucco. As a child he learned to draw under the tutelage of his father, mainly copying the work of classical masters like Leonardo da Vinci, Pisanello and Andrea Mantegna. His first collection of drawings was completed at age 5 (1931–32); a bestiary featuring 'Il Cane' (1932), a meticulously crafted drawing of a dog, textured by needlepoint (see image).

Caruso's early influences were the famous Orto botanico di Palermo and Monreale Cathedral, but as the Second Italo-Ethiopian War, Spanish Civil War and eventually World War II ignited, he turned his attention to depicting the horror and isolation of war. At age 19, he left Italy for the second time to visit Munich and the Kunsthistorisches Museum in Vienna, where he was profoundly affected by the work of Gustav Klimt and George Grosz.

Immediately after the end of World War II, Caruso signed up to study law at the University of Palermo. He earned a living by writing dissertations for exchange students, and claimed to have submitted over 100 successful papers during his time at the university. Having completed his own law degree, he began a second degree in classics, but dropped out following a dispute over the faculty's decision to award an honorary degree to a notorious (but unnamed) Sicilian-American celebrity.

In 1948 Caruso took his first trip to Prague where, confronted by the Nazi atrocities of World War II, he completed his first official collection entitled "Deutschland über alles", after George Grosz.

=== Artistic director, editor and graphic designer ===
In 1953, Caruso received a commission from the Sicilian Government to create Sicilia, a magazine series celebrating Sicilian art and culture. As artistic director, Caruso was charged with setting up one of the first modern printing presses in Sicily, and forging strong relationships with artists, intellectuals and photographers from around the world, including Richard Avedon, Herbert List and Brassai. In 1974 the magazine created a special edition in honour of Caruso, featuring a bespoke cover and 117 of his drawings.

The early success of Sicilia caught the eye of Irene Brin and Gaspero del Corso, founders of the Galleria dell'Obelisco in Rome, a famous hub for Italy's artistic elite. Caruso became the director of the gallery's publishing arm and struck up close friendships with poets De Liberto, Giuseppe Ungaretti and Leonardo Sinisgalli, and painters Ben Shahn, Fabrizio Clerici, Colombotto Rosso and Renzo Vespignani.

He also published the first books on The Triumph of Death (Palermo), Italian sculptor Giacomo Serpotta and German photographer Wilhelm von Gloeden.

=== Breakthrough (1952–1956) ===
Caruso's association with the Galleria dell'Obelisco led to his first major solo show in 1953, followed by his first monograph in 1954, curated by Leonardo Sinisgalli. The collection made Caruso's name internationally, featuring what Sinisgalli labelled "a tiny universe of jugglers, sleep-walkers, acrobats, time-wasters, street urchins and craftsmen darting around cheerfully like fish caught in the net of a tragic, silent and unstable world",

He had his first solo show in London at the Arthur Jeffress Gallery in 1955, and saw his work appear in the collections of celebrated patrons of the arts across the United States like Helena Rubenstein, Larry Aldrich, Richard Avedon, Walter Bareiss, Eric Estorick, Joan Whitney Payson, Stanley J. Seeger and John Hay Whitney.

Uomo Arrampicato/Climbing Man (1955). Oil, 90x90.

Suonatori ambulanti/Wandering Musicians (1953). Oil, 60x50. Nathan Cummings Collection, Chicago.

Gelataio/Ice Cream Seller (1953). Oil, 60x50. Formerly in the Helena Rubenstein Collection, New York

Uomo sdraiato/Man Lying Down (1952). Ink Drawing. Formerly in the Olivetti Collection, Rome

Giornalaio/The News Stand (1952). Ink Drawing. Formerly in the Renato Giani Collection, Rome

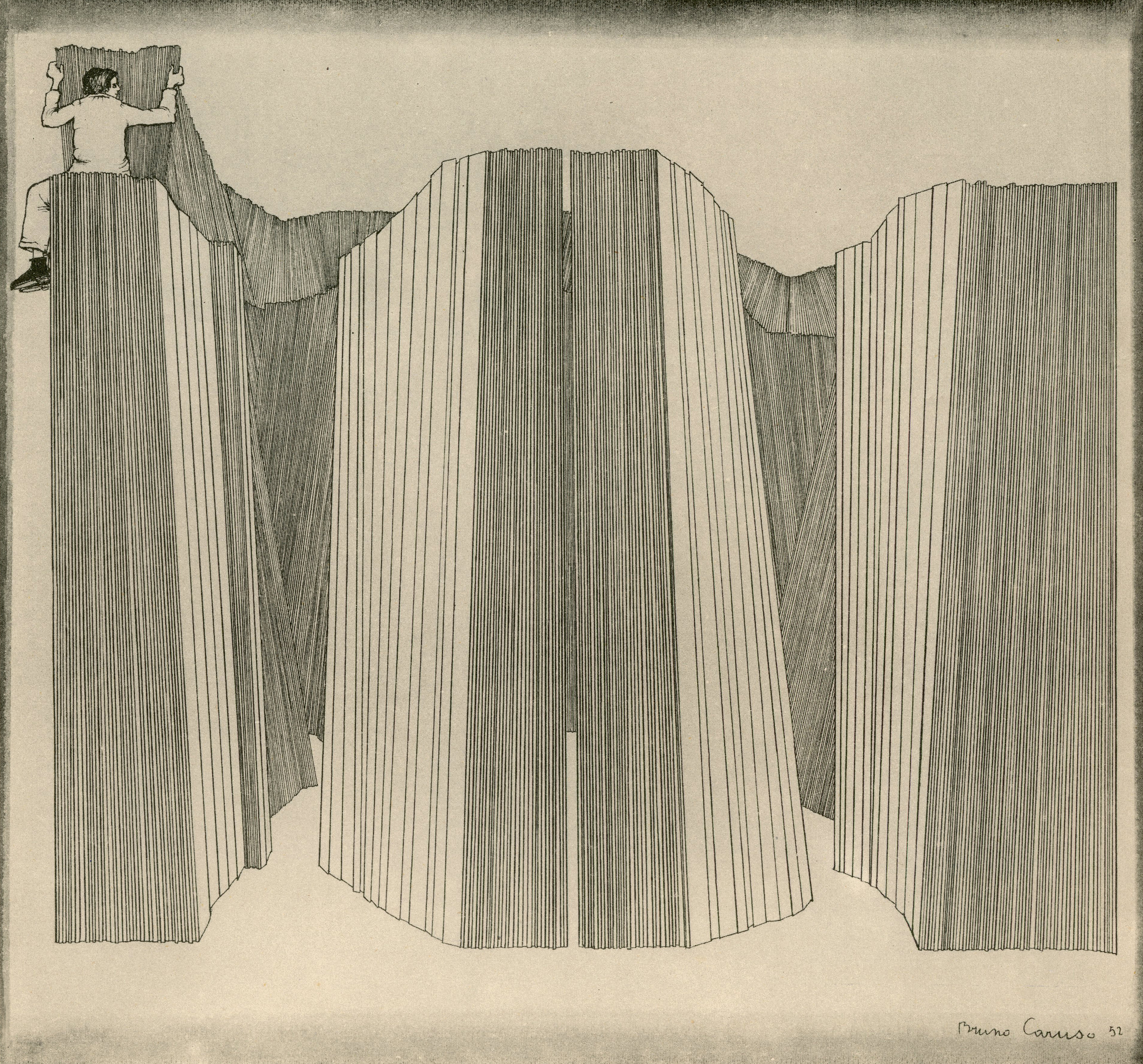
Deposito/Wood Deposit (1952). Ink Drawing. Private Collection, Baltimore

=== Political drawings (1948–1973) ===
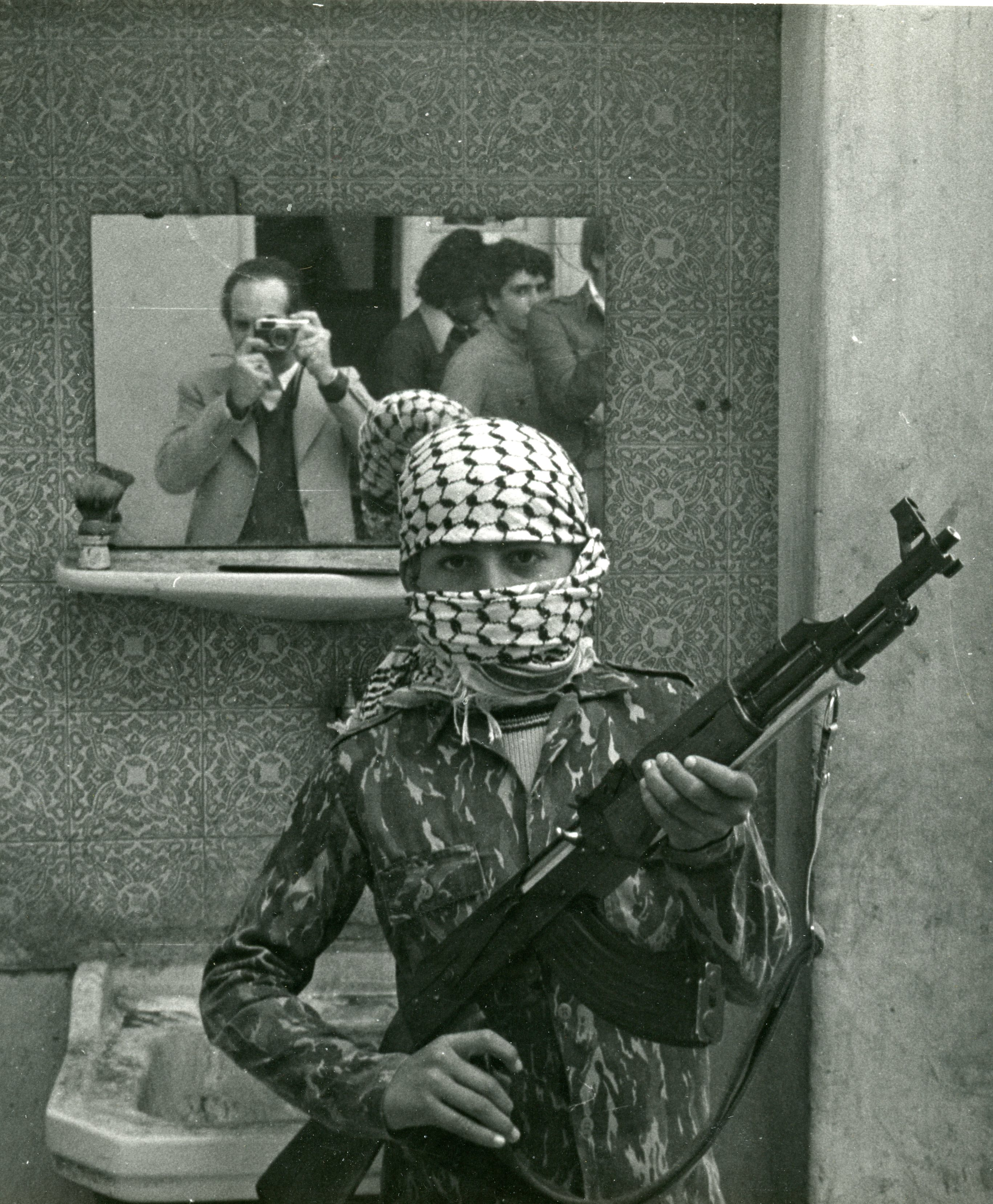
Reflection of Bruno Caruso photographing a guerilla fighter.

Back in Sicily, Caruso struck up a friendship with Girolamo Li Causi, leader of the Italian Communist Party, and began actively supporting the local peasant revolts. He completed a collection on the Portella della Ginestra massacre, and campaigned actively for the cultural emancipation of Sicily against the rise of the Mafia. His fight against the endemic corruption in Italian politics climaxed in the 1970s when he was fighting three concurrent legal cases against Michele Sindona, Giovanni Gioia and Vito Ciancimino.

Throughout the 1950s he worked at Palermo's Psychiatric Hospital (the Real Casa dei Matti di Palermo), producing a damning series of studies highlighting the use of medieval curing techniques and abject conditions in the wards, contributing to a major overhaul of the system. He returned to this theme throughout his career in collections like Manicomio (1969) and La Real Casa dei Matti (1975).

Over the following years Caruso travelled extensively to Iran, India, Thailand and Japan, studying Persian calligraphy and completing a series of drawings on dictatorships, famine, and the threat of nuclear warfare. These drawings formed part of four collections; Il Pugno di ferro / The Iron Fist (1962); Pace in terra / Peace on Earth (1963); Totum procedit ex amore (1964); and La Tigre di carta / The Paper Tiger (1964).

He returned to the United States in the month of the Kennedy assassination, guest of Jack Levine, Tennessee Williams and Ben Shahn. On this trip he completed commissions for Time, Fortune and Life magazines and, inspired by a meeting with Malcolm X, began work on Americana (1968) in which he championed the Civil Rights Movement and stood against the Vietnam War.

The fight against the Vietnam War became one of Caruso's most active political stands. He was invited to Hanoi by Phạm Văn Đồng, the prime minister of the Democratic Republic of Vietnam, and edited four books in support of their plight, including Vietnam: Biographia e documenti sull'aggressione imperialistica contro il popolo Vietnamita (1972). In 1972 he illustrated the last testament of Ho Chi Minh.

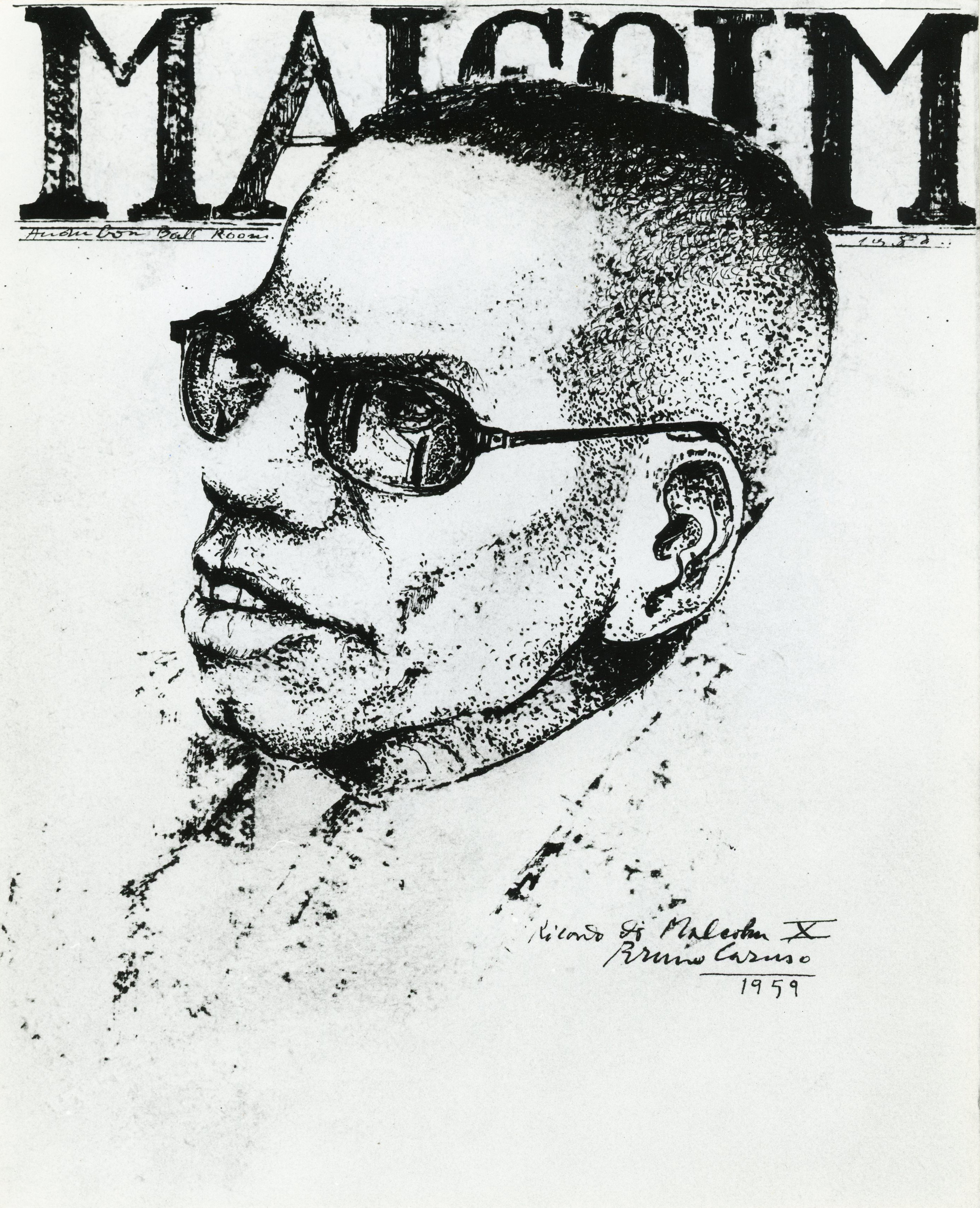
Malcolm (1959). Ink Drawing for Americana.

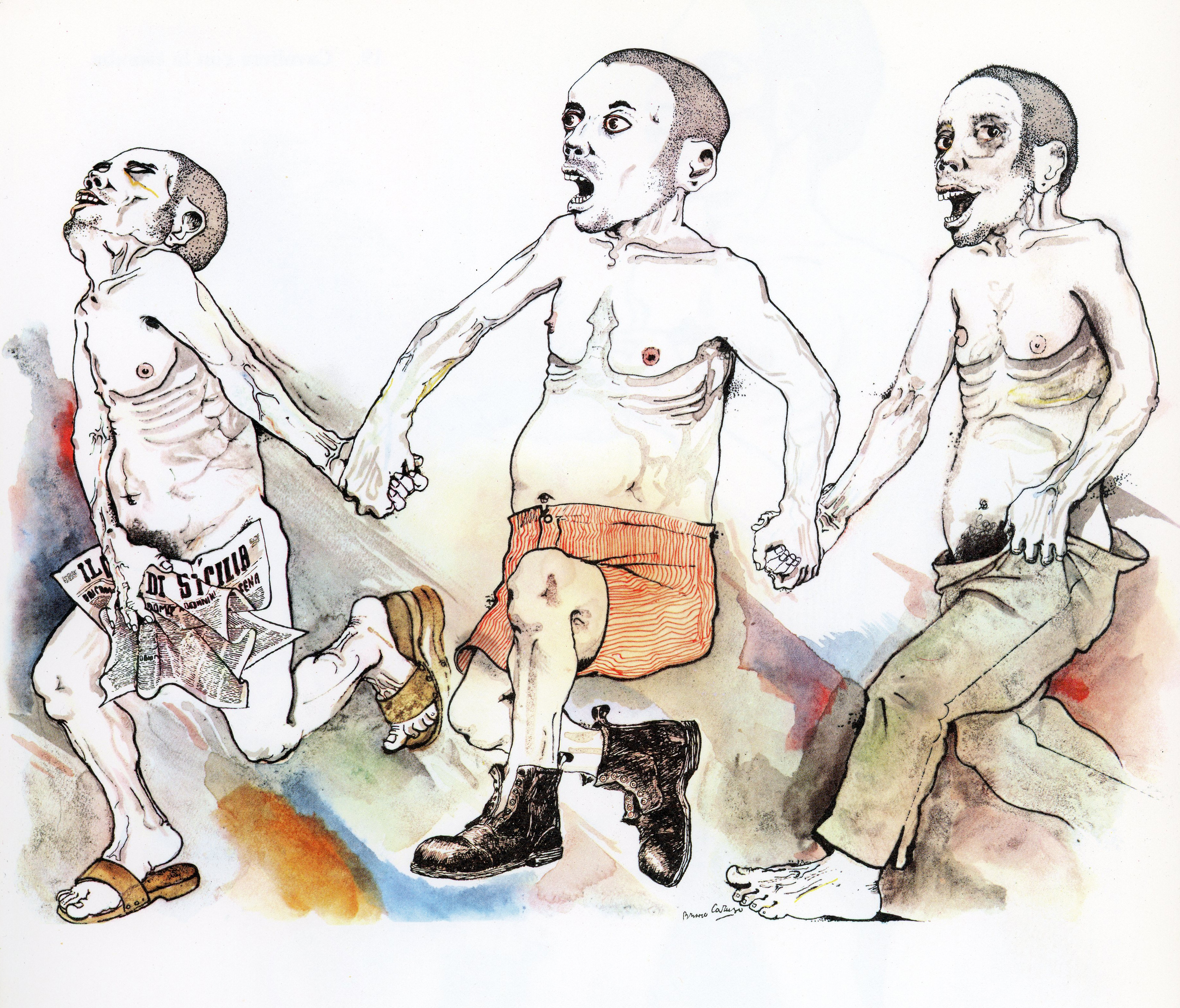
La corsa pazza/The Lunatic Run (1954). Ink and watercolour.

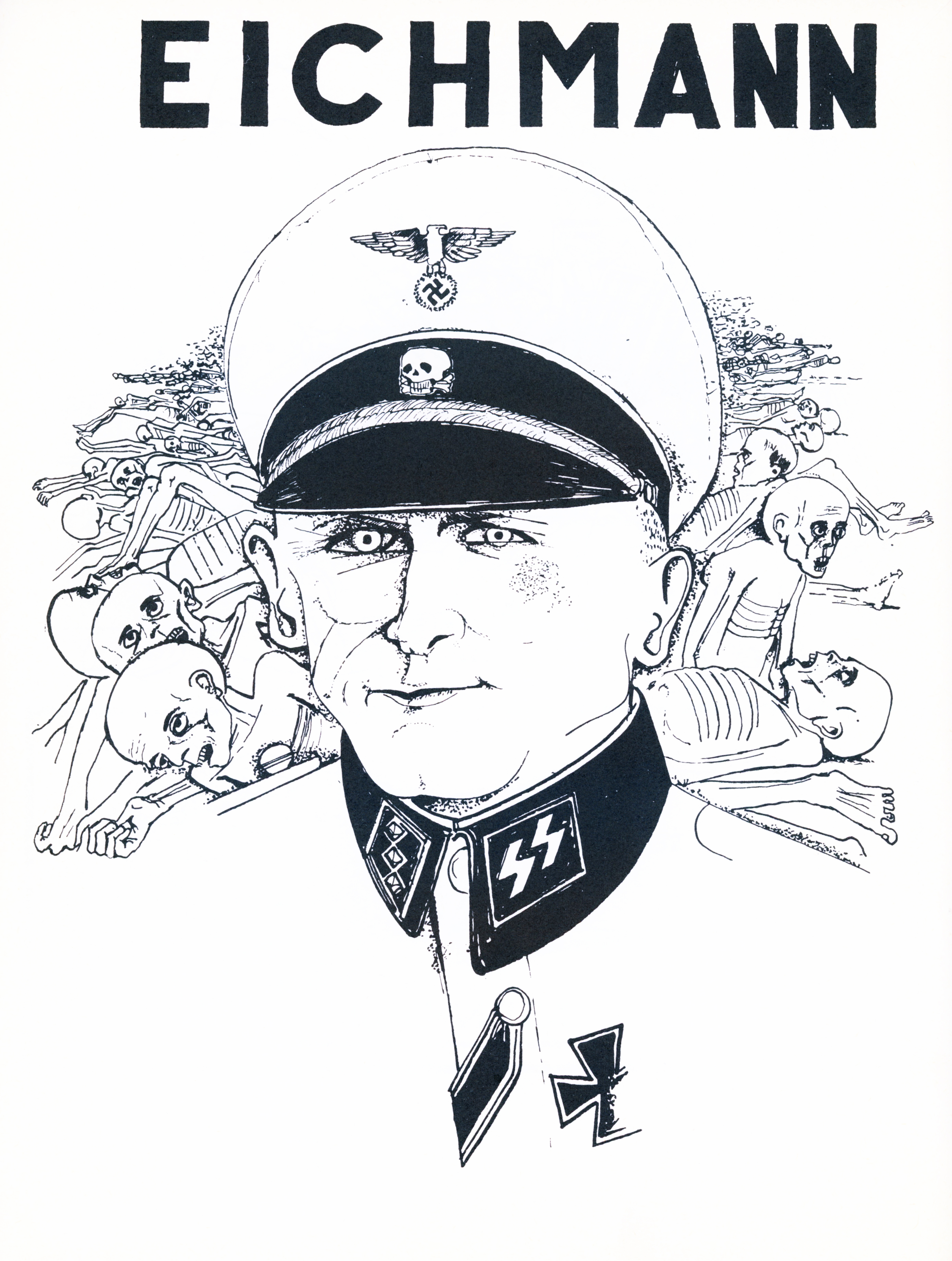
Eichmann (1954). Ink Drawing for Pace in terra.

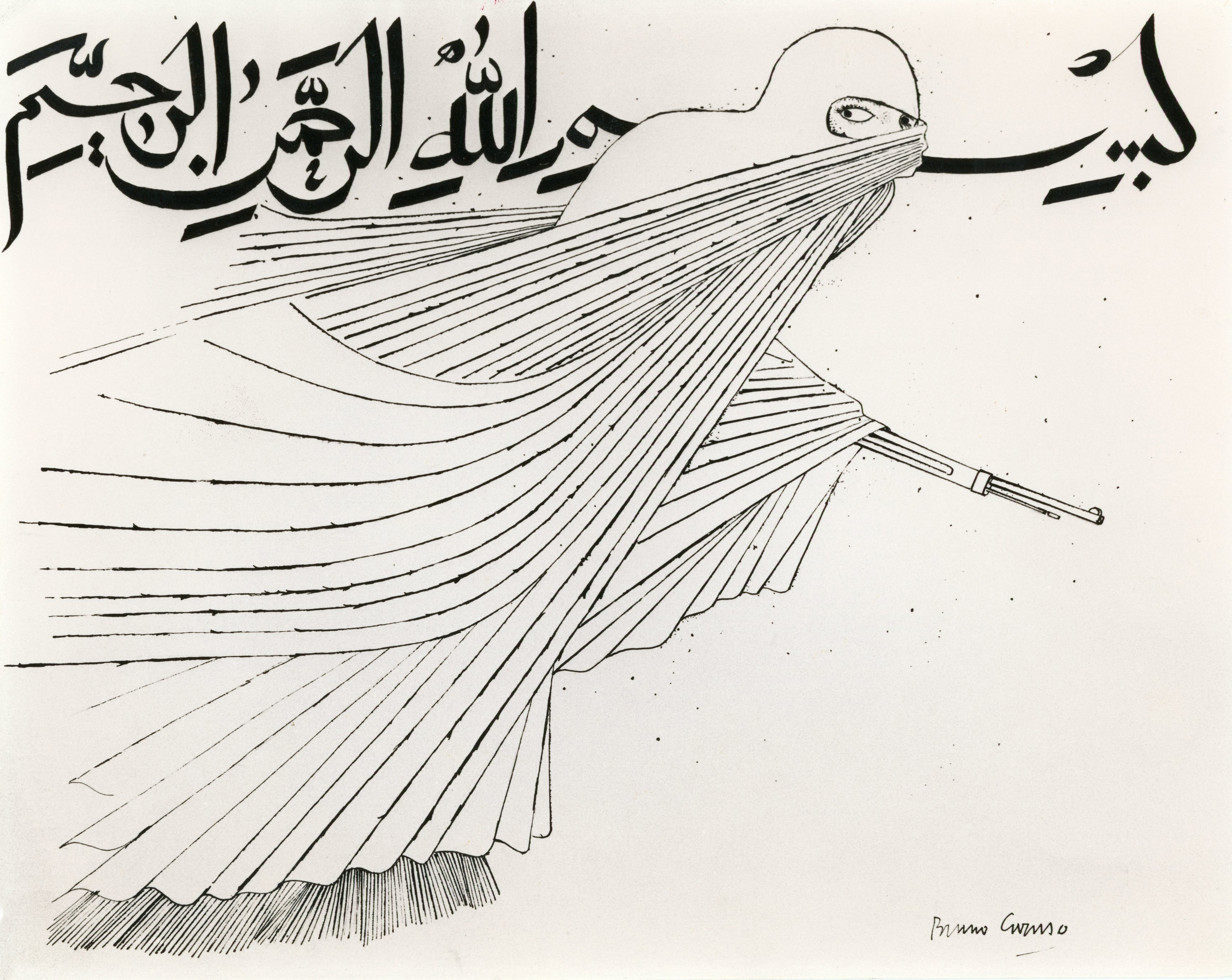
Rivolta/Revolt (1961). Ink Drawing, 63x50.

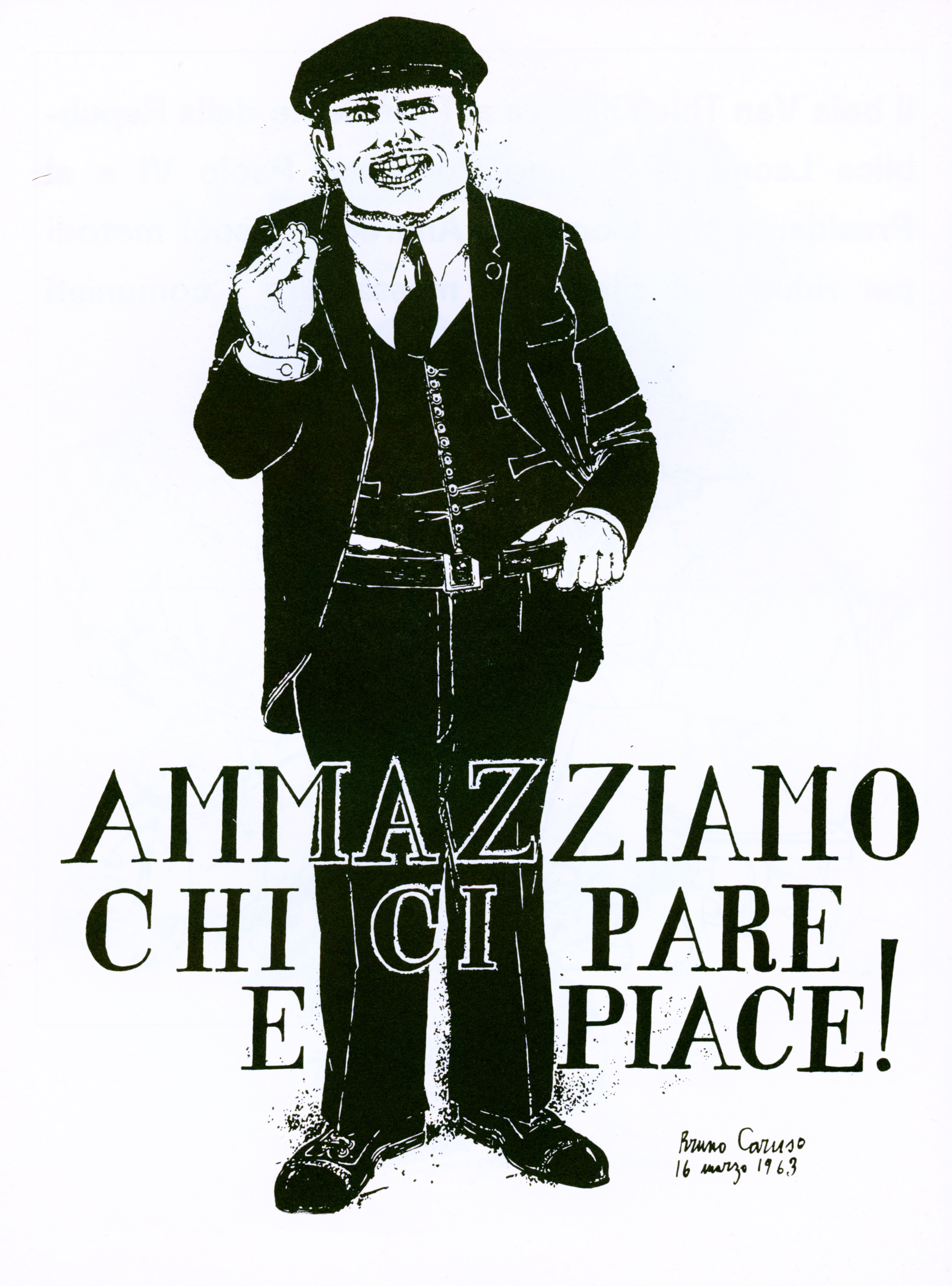
Ammazziamo chi ci pare e piace/We Kill Whoever we Please (1963). Ink Drawing for Pace in terra

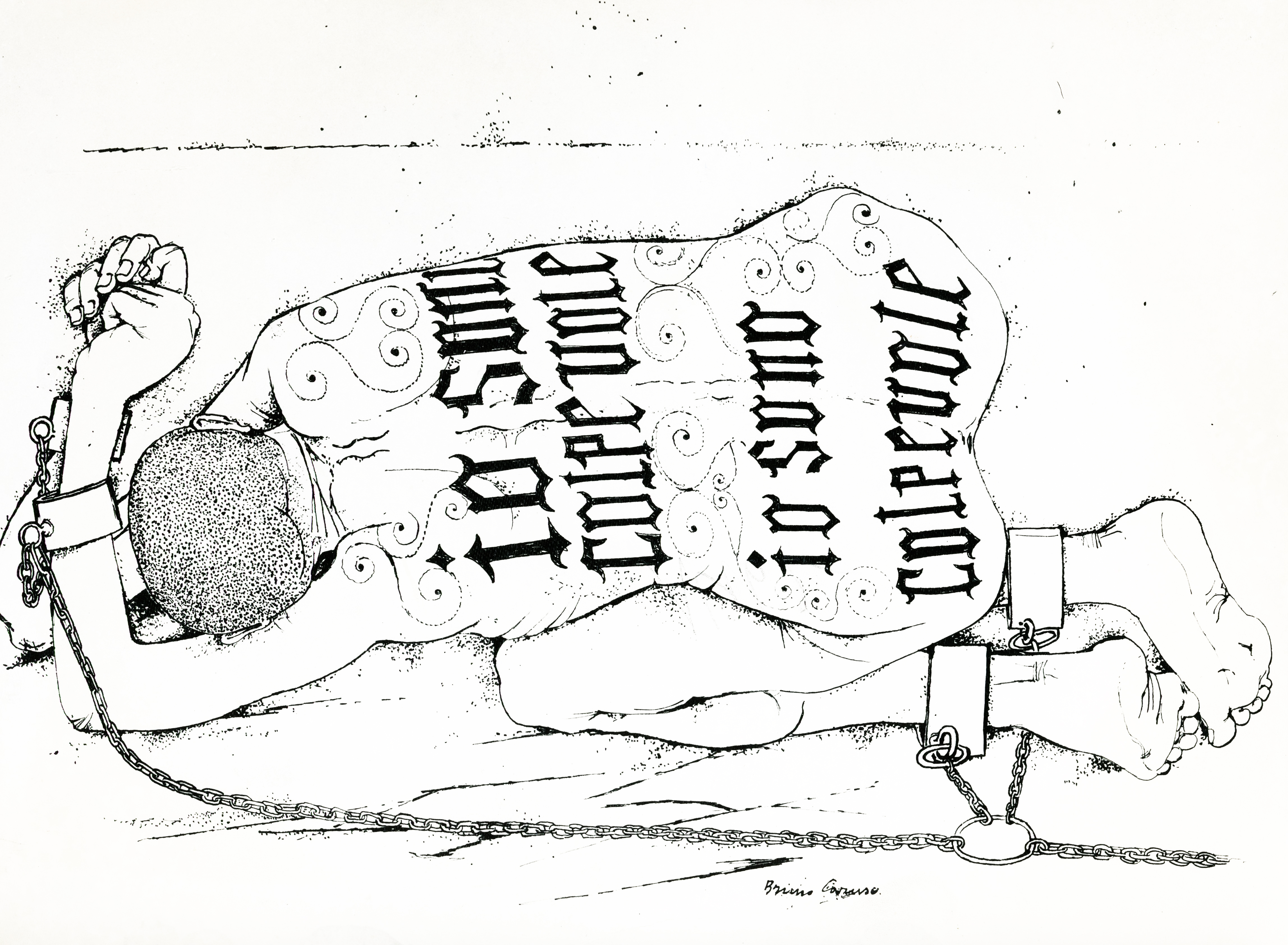
Il complesso di colpa/The Guilt Complex (1964). Ink Drawing for Franz Kafka's The Penal Colony.

=== Death (2018) ===
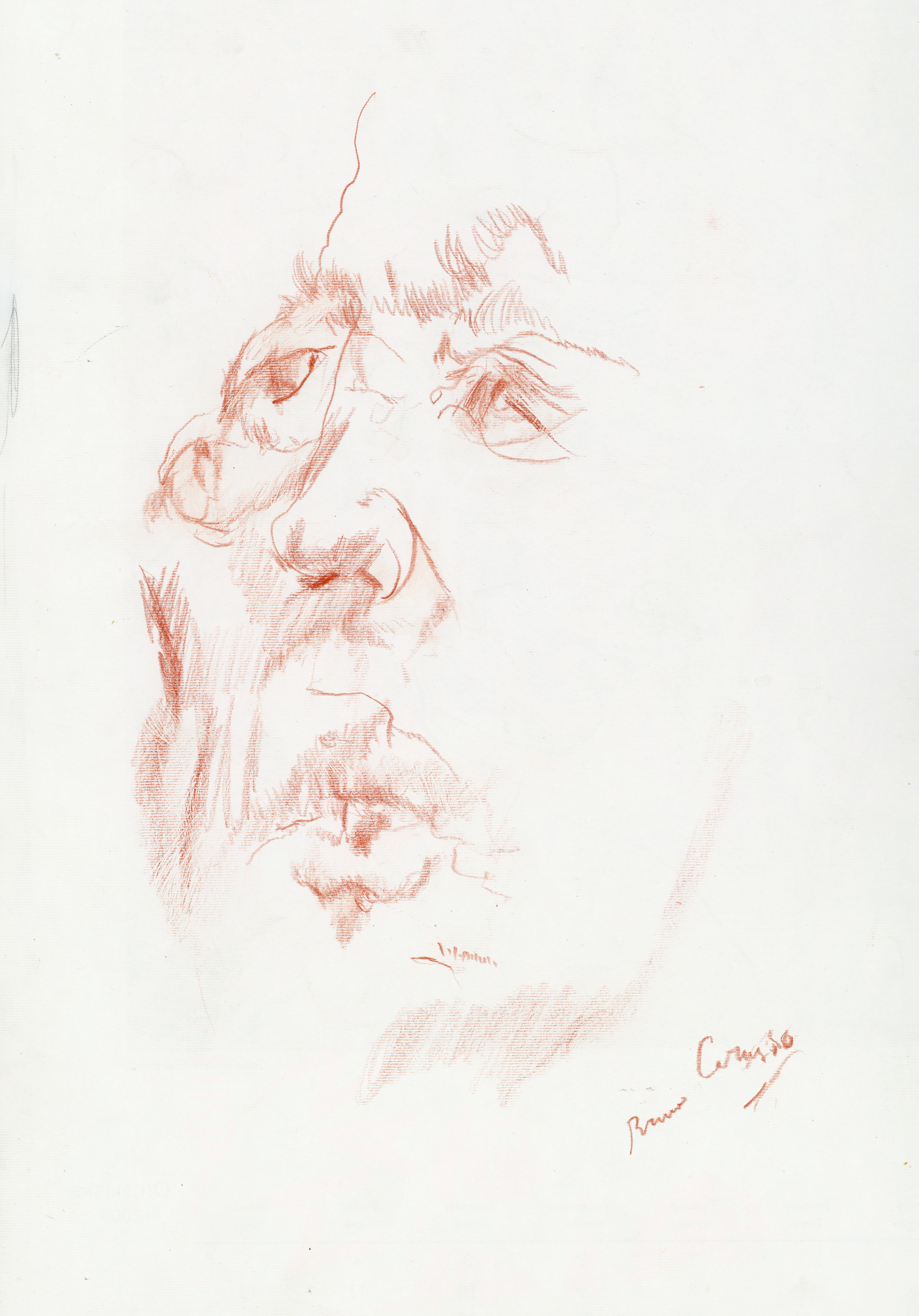
Bruno Caruso's last drawing (2018). Pencil on paper. Completed in his hospital bed shortly before his death.

Bruno Caruso died on 4 November 2018 at the Regina Margherita hospice in Rome. He was 91 years old. Days before his death, his son, Roberto Caruso, gave him a pencil and paper and, despite having refused to work for almost two years, he completed one final drawing: a melted, disfigured face (see image).

Leoluca Orlando, the Mayor of Palermo, paid tribute to Caruso's career saying;

"The death of Bruno Caruso marks the disappearance of one of the most sensitive and committed figures in the artistic and cultural panorama of our city. A man whose unmistakable style always highlighted social issues, and gave voice to those who needed it most, right up until the last."

== Museum collections ==
- Bruno Caruso at the Galleria Nazionale d'Arte Moderna
- Bruno Caruso at the Walker Art Center
- Bruno Caruso at the Saint Louis Art Museum
- Bruno Caruso at the National Gallery of Victoria
- Bruno Caruso at the Detroit Institute of Arts
- Bruno Caruso at the Brooklyn Museum
- Bruno Caruso at the WLD Foundation
- Portrait by Sanford H. Roth at the Art Institute of Chicago
- Portrait by Sanford H. Roth at the Los Angeles County Museum of Art

== Honours ==
- Gold Medal, Diploma of Merit, Dante Alighieri Society
  Rome, 2009
- Premio Archimede, Archimedes Prize
  Palermo, 2003 "Honouring the most important Sicilians from around the world."
- Gold Medal, Italian Medal of Merit for Culture and Art
  Rome, 21 February 2001 "An academic of San Luca, a renowned graphic artist and painter, Caruso was a master interpreter of society's ethics and contradictions."
- Honorary Citizenship, City of Naro
  Naro, 2000 "The award of the honorary citizenship of Naro is based on Bruno Caruso's moral and artistic character."
- Honorary Citizenship, Community of Castelbuono
  Castelbuono, 1997
- Commendatore, Order of Merit of the Italian Republic
  Rome, 1993
- Academic of San Luca, Accademia di San Luca
  Rome, 1993
- Honorary Degree in Letters and Philosophy, University of Palermo
  Palermo, 1986

== Key collections ==
No.	Title	Author	Publisher	Date	Location	Details
1	Deutschland über alles (Germany Above All)	Bruno Caruso	Weiss Buch	1949	Prague	12 drawings in black & white
2	Dalla calligrafia alla memoria (From Calligraphy to Memory)	Bruno Caruso	Olivetti	1959	Ivrea	38 drawings in black & white and colour
3	Pugno di ferro (Fist of Steel)	Bruno Caruso	Leonardo da Vinci	1962	Bari	69 drawings in black & white
4	Pace in terra (Peace on Earth)	Bruno Caruso	Leonardo da Vinci	1963	Bari	56 drawings in black & white. Cover by Ben Shahn
5	Tigre di carta (Paper Tiger)	Bruno Caruso	Leonardo da Vinci	1964	Bari	16 drawings in black & white
6	Totum Procedit Ex-Amore	Bruno Caruso	Edizioni dell'Elefante	1964	Rome	8 drawings in black & white
7	La mano dell'uomo (The Hand of Man)	Bruno Caruso	Edizioni dell'Elefante	1965	Rome	14 drawings in black & white
8	Americana	Bruno Caruso	Societa Gestione Riviste Associate	1968	Rome	Folder containing 8 drawings in black & white
9	Manoscritto sulle meraviglie della natura (Manuscript on the Marvels of Nature)	Bruno Caruso	Bestetti	1968	Rome	35 plates in facsimile. Edition of 500 numbered & signed
10	Manicomio (The Mental Asylum)	Bruno Caruso	Edizione della Colonna Infame	1969	Rome	20 drawings in black & white. Edition of 100 with an original etching
11	Repertorio Animalesco (Animalistic Repertoire)	Bruno Caruso	Alfani Editore	1972	Rome	6 drawings in black & white and 24 colour panels and text by Elio Mercuri
12	Disegni Siciliani di Bruno Caruso (Bruno Caruso's Sicilian Drawings)	Bruno Caruso	Edizione La Tavolozza	1972	Palermo	37 drawings and text by Leonardo Sciascia
13	La real casa dei matti (The Real Mental Asylum)	Bruno Caruso	Dedalo Libri	1975	Bari	46 colour drawings and an introduction by Franco Basaglia
14	Bianco fiore (The White Flower)	Bruno Caruso	Federazione Comunista	1975	Palermo	20 drawings in black & white
15	Mitologia dell'Arte Moderna (The Mythology of Modern Art)	Bruno Caruso	Franca May Edizioni	1977	Rome	117 drawings in colour

== Key monographs ==
No.	Title	Author	Publisher	Date	Location	Details
1	Bruno Caruso	Leonardo Sinisgalli	Galleria dell'Obelisco	1954	Rome	27 drawings in colour and black & white
2	Dipinti e disegni (1952-1955) (Paintings and Drawings (1952-1955))	Libero Bigiaretti	G.Priulla Editore	1955	Palermo	24 drawings and 18 colour panels
3	Opera grafica di Bruno Caruso (Bruno Caruso’s Graphic Work)	Peppe Fazio	Zangara	1958	Palermo	15 drawings and 14 colour panels
4	I mafiosi di Bruno Caruso (Bruno Caruso’s Mafiosi)	Renata Usiglio	Salvatore Sciascia Editore	1963	Caltanissetta - Rome	9 drawings in black & white
5	Opera grafica di Bruno Caruso (Bruno Caruso’s Graphic Work)	Elio Mercuri	Salvatore Sciascia Editore	1966	Caltanissetta - Rome	58 prints in black & white
6	Disegni di Bruno Caruso (Drawings by Bruno Caruso)	Leonardo Sciascia	Carte Segrete	1968	Rome	42 drawings in black & white
7	Galleria Magazine Number 1-2	Elio Mercuri	Salvatore Sciascia Editore	1969	Caltanissetta - Rome	Special edition dedicated to Bruno Caruso
8	Bruno Caruso: 100 disegni (Bruno Caruso: 100 Drawings)	Franco Solmi	Edizione Galleria 32	1969	Milan	100 drawings in black & white
9	Disegni politici di Bruno Caruso (Bruno Caruso's Political Drawings)	Roberto Giammanco	Dedalo Libri	1973	Bari	106 drawings in colour and black & white
10	Disegni di Bruno Caruso (Bruno Caruso's Drawings)	Dario Micacchi	Alfani Editore	1974	Rome	122 drawings in colour and black & white
11	Sicilia Magazine N.74	Bruno Caruso	S.F Flaccovio Editore	1974	Palermo	Special edition dedicated to Bruno Caruso, with 117 drawings
12	Caruso: Dipinti (Caruso: Paintings)	Enzo Bilardello	Edizioni 32	1975	Rome	103 drawings in colour and black & white
13	Il Fiore Rosso, Disegni politici (The Red Flower: Political Drawings)	Mario de Micheli	Mastrogiacomo Editore	1975	Padua	117 drawings in black & white
14	Bruno Caruso	Enzo Bilardello	S.F. Flaccovio Editore	1986	Palermo	265 drawings in colour and black & white
15	Bruno Caruso: I Libri (Bruno Caruso: The Books)	Leonardo La Rocca	Edizioni La Rocca	2003	Palermo	100 drawings in colour and black & white

== Exhibitions (1950–1965) ==
- 1951 — Palermo, Galleria Zabara: Sicilian Painters
- 1951 — Palermo, Giovane Sicilia: Contemporary Painters
- 1952 — Palermo, La Serenella: Bruno Caruso
- 1952 — Palermo, Galleria Arcobaleno: Bruno Caruso
- 1954 — Rome, Galleria dell'Obelisco: Joie de Vivre
- 1954 — Rome, Galleria dell'Obelisco: Bruno Caruso
- 1954 — Venice, Venice Biennale
- 1954 — Rome, Galleria dell'Obelisco: 5 Painters, 5 Sculptors, American Federation of Arts
- 1954 — Cincinnati, Cincinnati Museum of Modern Art: Young Italian Painters
- 1954 — Wakefield, Wakefield City Art Gallery: Contemporary Italian Art
- 1955 — US Tour, 20 Imaginary Views of the American Scene by 20 Italian Artists
- 1955 — Rome, Galleria dell'Obelisco: Around the World
- 1955 — London, Arthur Jeffress Gallery: Bruno Caruso
- 1955 — Venice, Third Esso Prize
- 1955 — Milan, Galleria del Sole: Paintings & Drawings by Bruno Caruso
- 1955 — Rome, VII Rome Quadriennale
- 1955 — Prato, 60 Masters for the Next 30 Years
- 1955 — Minnesota, Weisman Art Museum: Contemporary Italian Art
- 1955 — Sydney, L'Obelisco of Rome at David Jones
- 1956 — Rome, Galleria dell'Obelisco: Bruno Caruso
- 1956 — Zürich, Galerie H.U. Gasser: Bruno Caruso
- 1956 — London, Tate Gallery: Modern Italian Art
- 1956 — Turin, Galleria la Bussola: Bruno Caruso
- 1956 — Venice, Galleria del Cavallino: Bruno Caruso
- 1957 — Rome, Galleria d'Arte Moderna: In support of Exiled Hungarian Artists
- 1958 — Palermo, Galleria Flaccovio: Bruno Caruso
- 1958 — Milan, La Permanente: Young Italian Artists
- 1958 — London, Arthur Jeffress Gallery: Bruno Caruso
- 1958 — Rome, Galleria dell'Obelisco: Bruno Caruso
- 1958 — Berlin, Akademie Der Kunst: Italienische Kunst Am XX Jahrhundert
- 1958 — Paris, Galerie d'Art Moderne: Paris Biennale
- 1959 — Lima, Pintura Italiana
- 1959 — Rome, Galleria dell'Obelisco: Bruno Caruso
- 1959 — San Francisco, Museum of Modern Art: Italy Three Directions
- 1959 — Pisa, Contemporary Italian Graphic Work
- 1959 — Paris, Galerie Rive Gauche: Bruno Caruso
- 1959 — Pasadena, Pasadena Art Museum: 20th Century Art of Italy
- 1960 — Parma, Galleria del Teatro: Bruno Caruso
- 1960 — Rome, Galleria dell'Obelisco: Bruno Caruso, New York Drawings
- 1961 — Rome, Galleria Chiurazzi: 7 works by Bruno Caruso
- 1961 — São Paulo, Galleria Sistina: Bruno Caruso
- 1961 — Modena, Sala Comunale: Bruno Caruso
- 1961 — Genoa, Galleria San Matteo: Bruno Caruso
- 1961 — Rome, Galleria dell'Obelisco: The Sculptures of Bruno Caruso
- 1961 — Rome, Galleria Il Torcoliere: Bruno Caruso, Drawings, Etchings, Lithographs
- 1961 — Rome, Galleria dell'Obelisco: Against Nazism
- 1961 — Naples, Galleria Il Centro: Bruno Caruso
- 1961 — Milan, Galleria la Colonna: Bruno Caruso
- 1962 — Rome, Libreria al Ferro di Cavallo: Bruno Caruso, Pugno di Ferro
- 1962 — Bologna, Galleria Bianco e Nero: Bruno Caruso
- 1962 — Milan, Galleria Hoepli: Don't Forget
- 1962 — New York, ACA Gallery: Italian Art Today
- 1963 — Tokyo, Institute of Culture: Bruno Caruso and Franco Gentilini
- 1963 — Rome, Galleria Don Chiscotte: Bruno Caruso
- 1963 — Milan, Galleria Gianferrari: Bruno Caruso
- 1963 — Bari, Galleria La Panchetta: Bruno Caruso
- 1963 — New York, D'Arcy Gallery: Italian Drawing Today
- 1963 — Alexandria, V Biennale of the Mediterranean
- 1963 — Hamburg, Copenhagen: Junge Italienische Malerei
- 1963 — Rome, Galleria Don Chiscotte: Masters of Italian Painting
- 1963 — Rome, Galleria Sistina: Inauguration of 1963/64 Program
- 1964 — Palermo, Arte al Borgo: Bruno Caruso
- 1964 — Ferrara, Galleria Bigoni: Bruno Caruso
- 1964 — Rome, ACA Gallery: Bruno Caruso
- 1964 — Rome, Galleria Il Fante di Spade: New Italian Drawings
- 1964 — Milan, Galleria 32: Caruso, Guttuso, Porzano
- 1964 — Padua, Galleria Interni: Bruno Caruso
- 1964 — Moscow, Exhibition of 6 Graphic Artists
- 1964 — Rome, Galleria Penelope: Anthology of Drawings and Etchings
- 1965 — Rome, Galleria Bianco e Nero: Bruno Caruso
- 1965 — Milan, Galleria 32: Bruno Caruso
- 1965 — Turin, Galleria l'Approdo: Paintings of Bruno Caruso
- 1965 — Bari, Galleria la Panchetta: Graphic work of Bruno Caruso
- 1965 — Caltanissetta, Graphic work of Bruno Caruso
- 1965 — Rome, Palazzo delle Espozizioni: Quadriennale d'Arte
- 1965 — Rome, ANPPIA: Anti-fascism and Resistance
- 1965 — Milan, La Permanente: Biennale di Milano
- 1965 — Florence, Palazzo Strozzi: XVII National Exhibition, Fiorino Award
- 1965 — Parma, The Scalarini National Award for Political Drawings
