= Il Borghese =

Italian political and cultural magazine

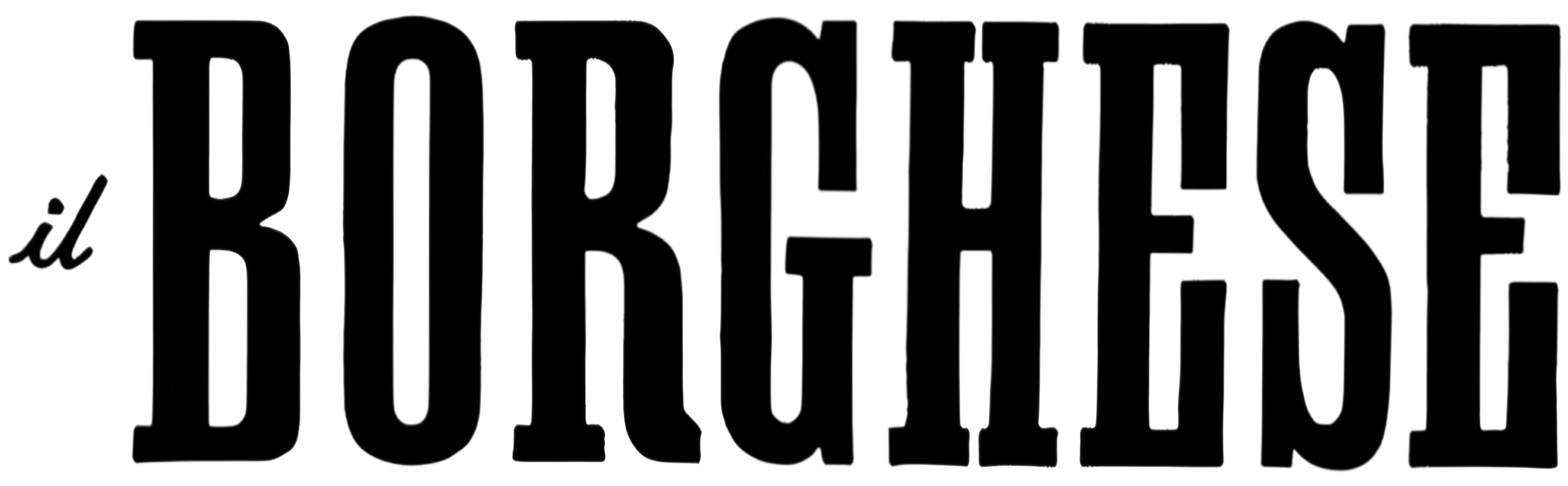
- Former editors: Leopoldo Longanesi; Indro Montanelli
- Categories: Political magazine; Cultural magazine
- Frequency: Monthly
- Founder: Leo Longanesi
- Founded: 1950
- Country: Italy
- Based in: Rome
- Language: Italian
- Website: Il Borghese
- ISSN: 0006-775X
- OCLC: 2794902

Il Borghese is a monthly cultural and political magazine with a right-wing stance published in Rome, Italy. The magazine has been in circulation since 1950 and is named after the conservative Borghese family. and published until 1993. The newspaper has resumed publication several times for short periods. Since 2007 it has been published by the publishing house Pagine.

== History and profile ==
Il Borghese was established by Leo Longanesi in 1950. He founded other magazines such as L’Italiano and Omnibus. Il Borghese is published weekly and has a right-wing and conservative stance.

Leo Longanesi and Indro Montanelli were the early co-editors of Il Borghese. The former held the post until his death in 1957. The other early contributors include Giovanni Ansaldo, Giuseppe Prezzolini, Giovanni Spadolini, Mario Tedeschi, Alberto Savinio, Ennio Flaiano, Colette Rosselli, Irene Brin, Goffredo Parise and Mario Missiroli.

In the 1950s the magazine was close to Christian Democracy Party. However, its support ended when Longanesi argued that the party was too weak to counter the "communist threat". Il Borghese was closed down in 2001. It was relaunched in Rome in December 2012.

== Directors ==
- Leo Longanesi (15 March 1950 – September 1957)
- Mario Tedeschi (September 1957 – 8 November 1993)
- Gianna Preda, Deputy Editor-in-Chief
- Luciano Cirri, Deputy Editor-in-Chief
- Vincenzo Maddaloni (June 1994 – 19 August 1994)
- Suspension of publications: August 1994 – April 1997
- Daniele Vimercati (5 April 1997 – 20 May 1998)
- Federico Guiglia (21 May – 31 August 1998)
- Vittorio Feltri (1 September 1998 – June 1999)
- Suspension of publications: 2000 – 2007
- Claudio Tedeschi (2007 – March 2021)
- Giuseppe Sanzotta (March 2021 – in office)

== See also ==
- List of magazines in Italy
