= League of Fiume =

Italian political organization

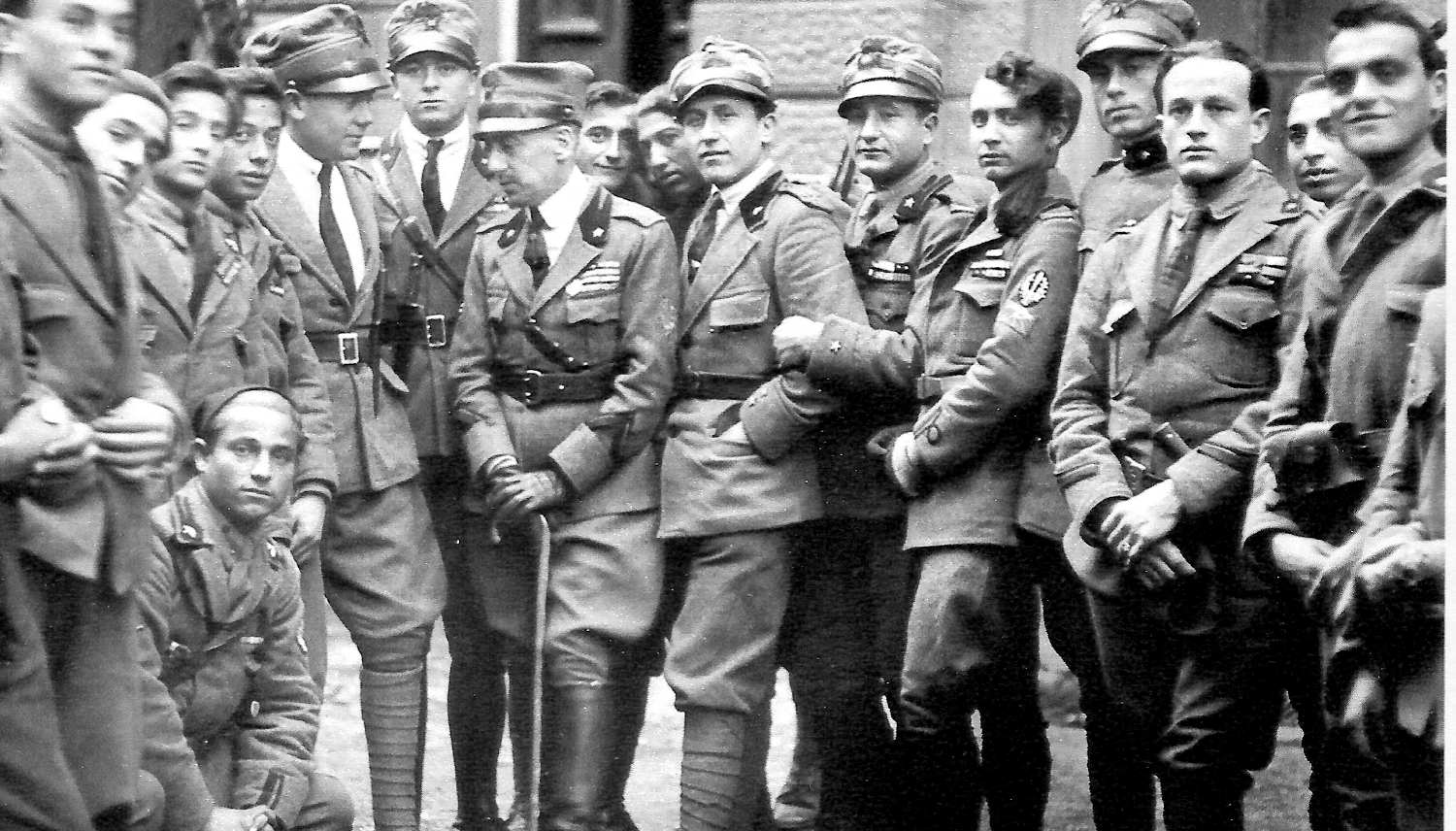
Gabriele D'Annunzio (in the middle with the/holding the stick) with some legionaries (components of the Arditi's department of the Italian Royal Army) in Fiume in 1919. To the right of D'Annunzio, facing him, Lt. Arturo Avolio (commander of the Ardit's department of Bologna Brigade).

The League of Fiume (Italian: Lega di Fiume) was one of the many political experiments that took place during the Italian Regency of Carnaro period when Gabriele D'Annunzio and the intellectuals that took part with him in the Fiume Endeavor attempted to establish a movement of non-aligned nations. In their plans, this league was meant to be an antithesis to the Wilsonian League of Nations, which was seen by many of Fiume's intellectuals as a mean to perpetuate a corrupt and imperialist status quo.

The organization was initially meant to help all oppressed nationalities in their struggle for political dignity and recognition, establishing links to many movements on various continents, but despite the links to various struggling groups across the international scene, it never found the necessary external support for success. Its most notable legacies remain today the Regency of Carnaro's recognition of the Soviet Union, the first state entity in the world to have done so, as well as the recognition of the independence of the Irish Free State before the government of Great Britain had done so, mostly thanks to the pressures of minister Henry Furst.

== Aims and aspirations ==
The project for the creation of a League of Oppressed Peoples had deep roots in D’Annunzio's thought, for he had conceived of his Fiuman endeavor in "universal" terms almost from the beginning. The comandante was not content to see the scope of his action limited to the city of Fiume, and he had established contacts with other foreign movements very early on.

The guiding spirit of the Lega di Fiume was Léon Kochnitzky, the Belgian poet who had come to Fiume late in the fall of 1919, left the city during the crisis of December, and then returned in January to become the head of the Fiuman International Relations Bureau (Ufficio Relazioni Esteriori). This institution, acting with scarce finances and only a handful of employees, attempted to enlist the support of foreign movements – and foreign powers – in behalf of the Fiuman "cause". At first, Kochnitzky (with the assistance of Eugenio Coselschi, Ludovico Toeplitz, Giovanni Bonmartini, Henry Furst and others) was content to gather statements of support from the representatives of movements sympathetic to D’Annunzio. By early spring there was abundant evidence that an "anti-League of Nations" would be able to count upon a wide range of support, and Kochnitzky decided to request the creation of a formal organization. There was good reason to be optimistic about the league as one learns from a long series of memoranda that Kochnitzky prepared for D’Annunzio during the last week of March and the first half of April, listing the nations and movements that were either already committed to the project or that were expected to join the cause in short order.

Kochnitzky saw the league as the vehicle for shattering the old order and establishing a world governed by the principles expounded in Italy and Life. It was, then, part of the sharp turn to the Left that characterized the policies of the Command during this period, and Kochnitzky significantly maintained that it was essential to acquire the support of the Soviet Union for the Lega. He considered this inevitable, claiming that Communist Russia, "like all spiritually alive elements of our time", could not fail to recognize the value of the new "International". Further, Kochnitzky urged D’Annunzio to support the Hungarian Communists and to issue an attack against Miklós Horthy’s regime. Such a stance would demonstrate the principles of "Fiumanism" upon which the new league would rest. Similarly, indicative of Kochnitzky's conception of the Lega is a statement in a note to the commander on 29 March: "while the presence of representatives of the Montenegrin Court seems scarcely desirable in Fiume for various reasons, it would instead be useful if one or more leaders of the Montenegrin insurrection against Serbia attended.".

Kochnitzky's conception of the Lega di Fiume was in line with the design for the Republic of the Carnaro. Both committed the Command to an alliance with radical socialist forces, and both demonstrated D’Annunzio's willingness to embrace the fundamental tenets of the European Left. Consequently, the plans for the league were subject to the same pressures as the planes for the Carta del Carnaro: as the internal position of Command was weakened by the attacks of the National Council, and when attempts to ally with Socialists failed (whether within Italy or on a European scale, as in the case of the talks with Vodovosoff), the project was threatened. Kochnitzky was aware of these problems, and explicitly linked the destiny of the league to the political situation in Fiume: “I know very well,” he told the commander on 29 March that "we can run into grave difficulties, given the internal situation in Fiume, and the numerous expulsions of the working-class elements...".

The league was placed in serious jeopardy by the events of early April 1920, and by Easter, Kochnitzky's messages to D’Annunzio were tinged with apprehension. On Easter Day he wrote: "I hope the League of Fiume will not give the world the grotesque spectacle of the 'League of Nations': impotence-indecision." But the plans of the Belgian poet could not survive the shock of the first half of April, and the League of Fiume slowly disappeared, at least in the form Kochnitzky had conceived it.

== Represented peoples ==
With genuinely global aspirations, the League of Fiume aimed to unite all of the following:

I. – Representatives of oppressed peoples: Fiume of Italy, the Islands, Dalmatia, Albania, German Austria, Montenegro, Croatia, German Irredentists now under Poland, Czecho-Slovakia, France and Italy (with reservations: autonomy) and the Pseudo-League of Nations, Catalonia, Malta, Gibraltar, Ireland, the Flemish. Islam, Morocco, Algeria, Tunisia, Libya, Egypt, Syria, Palestine, Mesopotamia, India, Persia, Afghanistan. India, Burma, China, Korea, the Philippines, Hawaii, Panama, Cuba, Puerto Rico. Oppressed races: The Chinese in California, the Blacks of America. The Israeli problem.

II. – Representatives of the countries unjustly damaged by the Treaty of Versailles: Russia, Romania, Belgium, Portugal, Siam, Germany, Bulgaria, Turkey, The Holy See.

III. – Delegations of parties and groups sympathizing with "Fiumanism", mainly Italian, French, English and American.

=== Ireland ===
In 1919 the revolutionary Irish Republic was founded. D'Annuzio and others offered arms to the Irish Republic in exchange for a statement of support by the Dáil Éireann (Irish Parliament). The Irish refused as they thought it would damage their goal in the long-run as they needed the support of America and the Vatican among others.
