= Henry Furst =

American dramatist

Henry Furst (New York, October 11, 1893 – La Spezia, August 15, 1967) was an American journalist, writer, playwright and historian.

== Biography ==
The versatile intellectual was born in New York on October the 11th 1893 from a family of German origins. He spoke and wrote in English, Italian, French, German. He was a ferocious anti-fascist during the Italian two decades of fascist rule (but he was even a “nostalgic” of Fascism after the fall), and a minister during the Italian Regency of Carnaro and had the merit of convincing Gabriele d'Annunzio to recognize the independence of the Irish Free State before any other nation. During the 1930s he worked as the Italian correspondent for The New York Times Book Review and as a partner of the literary journal L'Italiano. In this period, together with Indro Montanelli and Giovanni Ansaldo, he helped Leo Longanesi to establish the Longanesi publishing house and subsequently worked for Longanesi's periodical magazines Il Libraio and neo-fascist weekly newspaper Il Borghese.

Married to writer Orsola Nemi (alias Flora Vezzani), in her partnership he became a translator of German texts into Italian (Ernst Jünger, Franz Kafka, Werner Sombart), from Italian into English (Benedetto Croce) and in particular from English into Italian (Henry Miller, Saki, Robert Louis Stevenson, Edgar Allan Poe, Herman Melville, Charles Dickens).

== Bibliography ==
- Henry Furst, Songs of Tokimarne, Tipografia Moderna, La Spezia 1937
- Henry Furst, Simoun, La Bourdennais, Paris 1939
- Henry Furst, Donne americane, Milano, Longanesi, 1957
- Henry Furst, Simun, Milano, Longanesi, 1965
- Henry Furst, Il Meglio, introd. di Mario Soldati, prefaz. di Ernst Jünger, a cura di Orsola Nemi, Milano, Longanesi, 1970
- Orsola Nemi - Henry Furst, Caterina de Medici, riediz. Milano, Rusconi, 1980

== Translations and guardianship ==
- Robert Louis Stevenson, La magione superflua, tr. di H. Furst, collana "Il sofà delle muse" diretta da Leo Longanesi, Rizzoli, Milano 1940
- Robert Louis Stevenson e Lloyd Osbourne, La cassa sbagliata, tr. di H. Furst, Edizioni Documento, Roma 1944 (ristampa: Mursia, Milano 1966)
- William Makepeace Thackeray, La fiera delle vanità: romanzo senza eroe, con illustrazioni dell'Autore, tr. di Anna Banti; note di H. Furst, Longanesi, Milano 1948 (ristampa collana Poket Libri, tre voll., Longanesi, Milano 1966)
- Marmaduke Pickthall, Said il pescatore, tr. di O. Nemi e H. Furst, Longanesi, Milano 1948
- Charles Jackson, Il crollo del marito, tr. di H. Furst, Longanesi, Milano 1948 (ristampa: collana Pocket Libri, Longanesi, Milano 1966)
- William J. Knight, Virgilio romano, tr. di O. Nemi e H. Furst, Longanesi, Milano 1949
- Francis Toye, Giuseppe Verdi: la sua vita e le sue opere, tr. di O. Nemi e H. Furst, Longanesi, Milano 1950
- Omer Englebert, La vita di Giovanna d'Arco raccontata da lei stessa, tr. di O. Nemi e H. Furst, Longanesi, Milano 1950
- Gerard Walschap, Il peccato di Adelaide (1931), tr. di O. Nemi e H. Furst, Longanesi, Milano 1950
- Saki, L'insopportabile Bassington e altri racconti, tr. di O. Nemi e H. Furst, Einaudi, Torino 1950
- Cecil Delisle Burns, La prima Europa: cristianesimo medievale dal '400 all'800. tr. di H. Furst, Longanesi, Milano 1950
- San Francesco d'Assisi, Tutti gli scritti di San Francesco seguiti dai Fioretti, a cura di H. Furst, Longanesi, Milano 1951
- Herman Melville, Benito Cereno, seguito da: Il tartaro delle vergini, Il paradiso degli scapoli, Bartleby lo scrivano, tr. di O. Nemi e H. Furst, Longanesi, Milano 1951
- Hilaire Belloc, La rivoluzione francese, tr. di O. Nemi e H. Furst, Longanesi, Milano 1951
- Bruno Traven, Speroni nella polvere, tr. di O. Nemi e H. Furst, Longanesi, Milano 1951
- Vita Sackville-West, La signora scostumata, tr. di O. Nemi e H. Furst, Longanesi, Milano 1952
- H. G. Wells, Il meglio, pref. di H. Furst, tr. a cura di O. Nemi e R. Lotteri, Longanesi, Milano 1955
- Norman Douglas, Vento del Sud; traduzione dall'originale inglese di Henry Furst, Milano: Longanesi, 1955; Milano: Leonardo, 1992, ISBN 88-355-1074-0; Capri: La conchiglia, 2003, ISBN 88-86443-59-5
- Edgar Allan Poe, Epistolario, raccolto da J. W. Ostrom; pref., biografia dei personaggi principali e bibliografia delle traduzioni italiane a cura di H. Furst, Longanesi, Milano 1955
- Charles Baudelaire, Il meglio, con nove disegni dell'Autore, pref. di H. Furst, tr. di O. Nemi, Longanesi, Milano, 1955
- Anne Morrow Lindbergh, Dono dal mare, tr. di O. Nemi e H. Furst, Bompiani, Milano 1956
- Patrick Dennis, Zia Mame: irriverente tentativo autobiografico, tr. di O. Nemi e H. Furst, Bompiani, Milano 1956 (ristampa: Garzanti, Milano 1974)
- Barbara C. Hooton, Gli ospiti. Indiscrete confidenze di Barbara C. Hooton a Patrick Dennis, tr. di O. Nemi e H. Furst, Bompiani, Milano 1958
- Joseph Chamberlain Furnas, Anatomia del paradiso, tr. di O. Nemi e H. Furst, Longanesi, Milano 1959
- Patrick Dennis, Intorno al mondo con la zia Mame, tr. di O. Nemi e H. Furst, Bompiani, Milano 1960
- Ernst Jünger, Le api di vetro, tr. di H. Furst, Longanesi, Milano 1960
- Charles Augustin de Sainte-Beuve, Il meglio, pref. di Carlo Bo, intr., scelta e note di H. Furst, Longanesi, Milano 1960
- Moses I. Finley, Il mondo di Odisseo, tr. di O. Nemi e H. Furst, pref. di G. Antonelli, Cappelli, Bologna 1962
- Graham Greene, Inedito, tr. a cura di A. Malvezzi, E. Barzini, O. Nemi e H. Furst, Longanesi, Milano 1962
- Barry Morris Goldwater, Il vero conservatore, tr. di H. Furst, Edizioni del Borghese, Milano 1964
- Johann Wolfgang von Goethe, Le affinità elettive, tr. di H. Furst, Rusconi, Milano 1967
- John Barth, L'opera galleggiante, tr. di H. Furst, Longanesi, Milano 1968 (ristampa: Bompiani, Milano 1996; tr. rivista da M. Testa, minimum fax, Roma 2003)
- Henry Miller, Plexus, Longanesi, Milano 1968 (Pocket Longanesi, Milano 1970)
- Charles Dickens, Le avventure di Pickwick, tr. di H. Furst, Tumminelli, Roma 1968
- Frederick Rolfe (detto Baron Corvo), Don Renato, presentazione di S. Perosa, tr. di H. Furst, Longanesi, Milano 1971
- Gerard Walschap, Suor Virgilia, tr. O. Nemi e H. Furst, Maia, Siena 1978

== Sources ==
- Indro Montanelli, Furst, in Rapaci in cortile, Longanesi, Milano 1954, pp. (poi in Incontri, Rizzoli, Milano 1961, pp. )
- Indro Montanelli e Marcello Staglieno, Leo Longanesi, Rizzoli, Milano 1981, pp.
- Mario Soldati, Due amici, in Rami secchi, Rizzoli, Milano 1989, pp.
