= Leo Longanesi =

Italian author, painter, film director, and screenwriter (1905–1957)

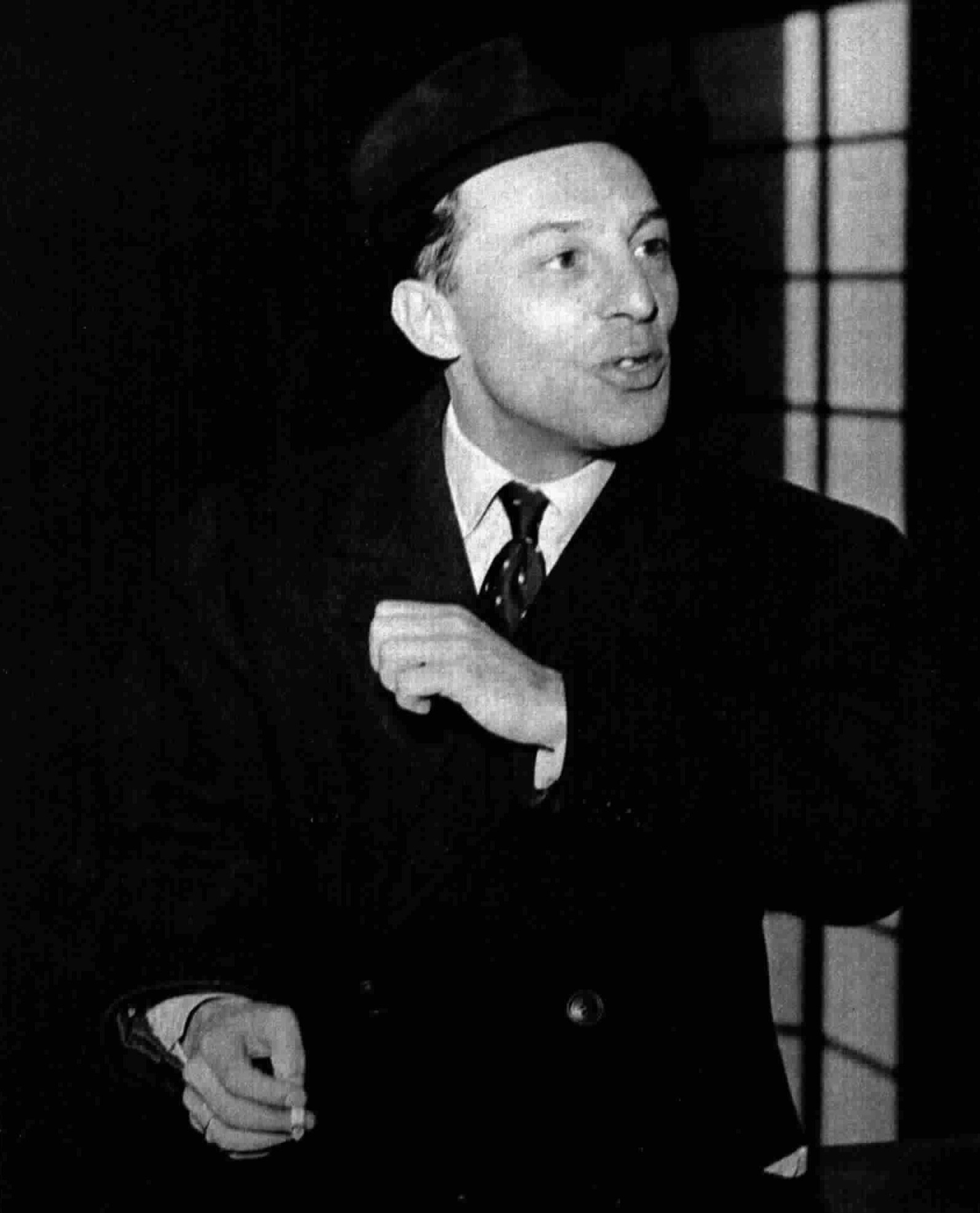
- Longanesi in the early 1950s
- Born: Leopoldo Longanesi; 30 August 1905; Bagnacavallo, Italy
- Died: November 27, 1957 (aged 52); Milan, Italy
- Education: University of Bologna (J.D.)
- Occupations: Journalist; publisher; playwright
- Spouse: Maria Spadini (m. 1939; died 1957)
- Children: 2 daughters, 1 son
- Writing career
- Years active: 1920–1957
- Period: 20th century
- Genres: Biography; drama; comedy; cartoon
- Subjects: Italian society and customs
- Movement: Strapaese

Signature
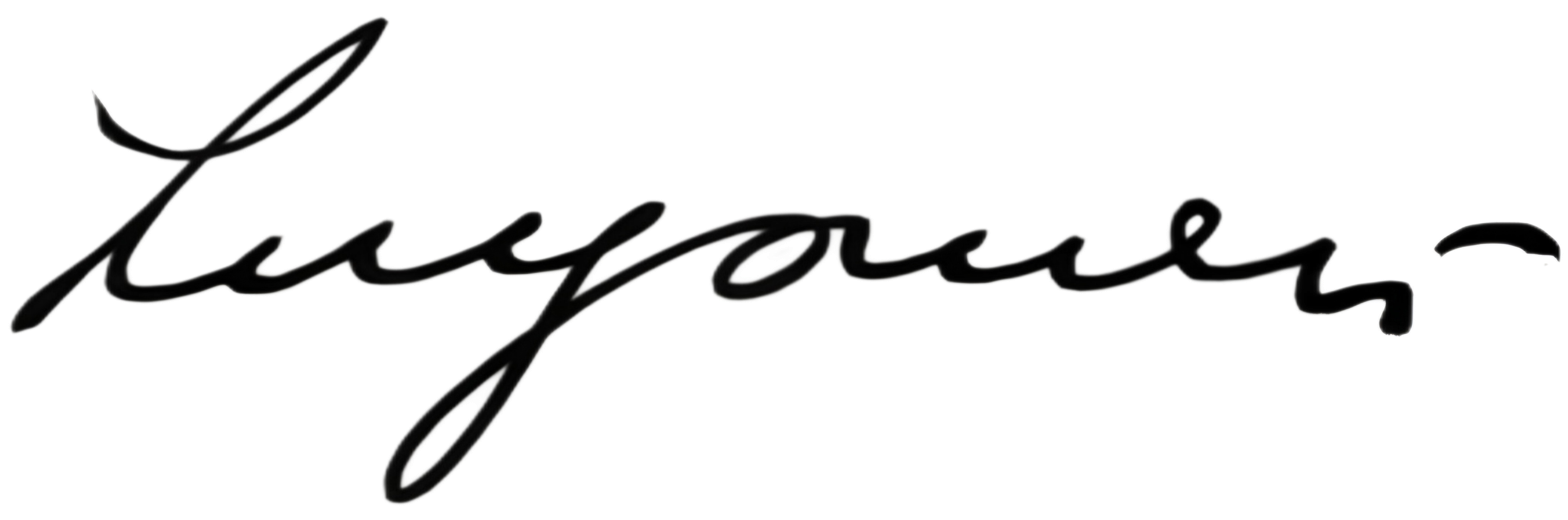

Leopoldo "Leo" Longanesi (30 August 1905 – 27 September 1957) was an Italian journalist, publicist, screenwriter, playwright, writer, and publisher. Longanesi is mostly known in his country for his satirical works on Italian society and people. He also founded the eponymous publishing house in Milan in 1946, and was a mentor figure to Indro Montanelli (a journalist and historian, as well as the founder of Il Giornale, one of Italy's most famous newspapers).

Between 1927 and 1950 Longanesi published several magazines, including L'Italiano (1926), Omnibus (1937), and Il Borghese (1950), the last of which is a cultural and satirical weekly paper with a conservative stance. Longanesi described himself as a "cultural anarchist", or "conservative anarchist", and headed a popular right-wing group, which embraced conservatism, agrarian virtues, anti-democracy, and nostalgic post-fascism after World War II, despite the fact that he had often mocked the regime before the war, and remained distant from any neo-fascist movement after it.

An elegant and refined cartoonist, Longanesi also wrote several memoirs, characterised by a ruthless streak, such as In piedi e seduti, Una vita, and Ci salveranno le vecchie zie?

== Biography ==
=== Early life and career ===
Born in Bagnacavallo, Longanesi was the son of Paolo Longanesi, director of a gunpowder factory in Lugo, and Angela Marangoni, who came from a local, wealthy landowning family. In 1911, when Leo was six, the Longanesi family moved to Bologna, where, in keeping with the family's affluence, Leo attended the most prestigious school and learned French at the Liceo Galvani. In 1920, at the age of 15, Leo wrote his first printed sheet, Il Marchese, followed by the monthly magazines È permesso…? Zibaldone dei giovani (1921), Il Toro (1923), and Il Dominio (1924). After high school, he earned a bachelor's degree in law at the University of Bologna.

Once graduated, Longanesi developed his social connections by joining the city's worldly elite, literary cafés, and nighthawk pubs. He became friends with leading intellectuals like Galvano Della Volpe, Giorgio Morandi and Vincenzo Cardarelli, as well as with young rising politicians like Leandro Arpinati, Dino Grandi and Italo Balbo. During this time, Longanesi developed his interest in politics, and began collaborating with L'Assalto (transl. "The Assault"), a fascist newspaper in Bologna, in 1924. In the same year he met Mino Maccari, a famous painter, who introduced him to Rome's cultural circles. With Maccari and popular writer Curzio Malaparte, Longanesi began a cultural movement called Strapaese (literally "great country"), which believed Italian Fascism to be the bearer of rural traditions and patriotic virtues.

Living between Rome and Bologna, Longanesi worked with the magazine Il Selvaggio (transl. "The Savage") from 1925 to 1929, and ran his weekly magazine L'Italiano (transl. "The Italian") from 1926 to 1942. Headquartered first in Bologna and then in Rome, the magazine saw collaborators such as Maccari, American playwright Henry Furst, and writer Giovanni Comisso, former legionnaire of Fiume with Gabriele D'Annunzio. Around the same period, Benito Mussolini was establishing his police state, banning opposition parties, and imposing a cult of personality based on his figure (the Duce) and the National Fascist Party. Longanesi and his collaborators grew close to the new regime, and started a cultural debate on the relationship between the arts and Fascism. In 1926 Longanesi wrote his first great work, the "Vade-mecum of the perfect fascist". The book expresses, with the motto "Mussolini ha sempre ragione" (transl. "Mussolini is always right"), a mix of adoration and caricature of Mussolini's dictatorship. During Mussolini's regime (from 1926 to 1943), Longanesi was both loyal and critical to Fascism, and was ironic about the Battle for Grain (a self-sufficiency campaign for wheat production), the mystification of Ancient Rome, and fascist imperialist dreams on Africa.

=== Under Fascism ===
In 1927 Longanesi created his first publishing house L'Italiano Editions (property of L'Italiano magazine), and published works of fascist writers who were critical of the regime, such as Malaparte, Riccardo Bacchelli, Vincenzo Cardarelli, Antonio Baldini, and Telesio Interlandi, who later became a major supporter of the racial laws (1938) against Jews. The following year Longanesi purchased the publishing house from Malaparte, and later acquired the magazine La Voce (transl. "The Voice"), which had been founded by conservative journalist Giuseppe Prezzolini in 1919. In 1929 Longanesi ran as a candidate for the general election (which presented only the Fascist Party), but was not elected. In July that year Longanesi was hired to direct L'Assalto, which he managed until his resignation in 1931. His dismissal was the direct result of a strong and irreverent piece on Senator Giuseppe Tanari, financer of the squadrismo (literally "squadronism"), a radical tendency inside Fascism that had led to attacks, assaults, and even the murder of political dissidents. Longanesi was prompted to write the article by an incident in May 1931, when he had attended a performance of conductor Arturo Toscanini at the Teatro Comunale in Bologna, together with Galeazzo Ciano, Mussolini's son-in-law, and Arpinati, Longanesi's old friend. At the end of the piece, Ciano and Arpinati called on Toscanini to play Giovinezza, the unofficial anthem of Fascist Italy. When Toscanini refused, Ciano and Arpinati left the theatre disappointed, and later on radical fascists assaulted Toscanini outside the theatre. Longanesi was erroneously believed to be the first one to slap him, since he had published the article against the conductor's refusal the following day.

In May 1932 Longanesi moved with his parents and grandparents to Rome and bought, an elegant house in Corso Vittorio Emanuele II. He also moved the headquarters of L'Italiano and Il Selvaggio to the capital. Both magazines were in decline and Longanesi directed them almost entirely on his own. Despite his criticisms, Longanesi was chosen by the regime to organize a literary exhibition on Mussolini for the 10th anniversary of the March on Rome, which opened on 28 October 1932. After the start of the Second Italo-Ethiopian War in 1935, Longanesi also became the chief of propaganda. Longanesi requested to direct a big newspaper in return for his services to Fascism, but was refused by the regime, which feared that new magazines and papers, especially if under the direction of critics of the dictatorship, would undermine its strict control over the press. Despite all this, Longanesi's connection with Mussolini's son Vittorio allowed him to work for Cinema, a magazine of film criticism, in September 1936. He was fired a month later for an unpleasant photographic piece on the regime.

On 3 April 1937 Longanesi created Omnibus, an illustrated news magazine on literature and the arts, later described as the "father of Italian magazines", especially for its use of photographs and images. The magazine was published by Angelo Rizzoli (except for the first six months by Arnoldo Mondadori), and presented notable and rising journalists and artists, such as Indro Montanelli, Alberto Moravia, Vitaliano Brancati, Ennio Flaiano, Mario Soldati, Mario Pannunzio, Arrigo Benedetti, and Alberto Savinio. Despite the magazine's immediate success, Omnibus was forced to close by the Ministry of Popular Culture (Minculpop) on 2 February 1939, officially without a clear explanation, but most probably because of its contributions by Jewish intellectuals, such as Moravia, and anti-fascists like Pannunzio. Nevertheless, Longanesi was appointed as a technical-artistic consultant by the Minculpop itself in 1940. Around the same time he was also chosen by Rizzoli to direct a book series, Il sofà delle Muse (transl. "The Muses' Sofa"), and published successful works like The Tartar Steppe (1940), Don Giovanni in Sicily (1941) and The Truth about the Motta Affair (1937, reedited in 1941).

=== Second World War ===
On 10 June 1940, Italy declared war against France and the United Kingdom, in alliance with Nazi Germany and other Fascist-inspired nations of the Axis powers. Despite initial popular enthusiasm for the Italian entrance into the Second World War, Longanesi was skeptical, thinking that it would be the ruin of Italy. Despite his personal beliefs, and remaining faithful to his controversial and eclectic nature, Longanesi chose to stay loyal to the Fascist regime, worked for Primato magazine, directed by former Public Education Minister Giuseppe Bottai, and invented war slogans like "Taci! Il nemico ti ascolta" (transl. "Shut up! The enemy is listening to you"), "La patria si serve anche facendo la sentinella ad un bidone di benzina" (transl. "The fatherland could also be served by keeping watch on a petrol barrel") and "Una pistola puntata contro l'Italia" (transl. "A gun aimed at Italy"). After the losing the Greco-Italian War in 1941 and the Tunisian Campaign in 1942, Italy fell into crisis and became more subjected to Germany.

On 25 July 1943, a coup d'état took place against Mussolini to overthrow the Fascist regime. Longanesi, Pannunzio and Benedetti wrote a piece celebrating the apparent return of freedom and hope for Italy's retreat from war. The new Prime Minister Pietro Badoglio, however, secretly signed the armistice of Cassibile with Allied Powers on 3 September 1943, while all of Italy was directly under German military influence. On 8 September, with a proclamation, Pietro Badoglio announced the switching allegiances from the Axis to the Allies, after which he fled to Brindisi with the royal family and the government, leaving military and public authorities without orders. Italy separated into a German-occupied north and an Allied-occupied south. On 16 September, Longanesi fled to the south of Rome with his friends Mario Soldati, Steno, and Riccardo Freda, and arrived at Vinchiaturo on 29 September. On 1 October, Longanesi moved to Naples, where, along with Steno and Soldati, he collaborated with Allied authorities on an anti-fascist propaganda FM radio named White Star. However, Longanesi quickly grew critical of the new anti-fascist political class, which he found composed of old opportunists and new ambitious figures united in a climate of political chameleonism. On 5 June 1944, Rome was finally liberated, and Longanesi returned to the capital on 1 July, writing the comedy Il suo cavallo (transl. "His Horse"), a mockery of Mussolini, similar to Shakespeare's Richard III.

=== Post-war, political activism and death ===
In January 1946, Longanesi moved to Milan with his family, while his parents moved to Imola. Shortly after, Longanesi accepted an offer from industrialist Giovanni Monti and founded the publishing house Longanesi & Co. on 1 February 1946 and simultaneously published Il Libraio (transl. "The Bookseller"), a bibliographic magazine, from 1946 to 1949. Politically, Longanesi became a prominent opponent of the new republican democracy that replaced Fascism, stating that,

Italy is a democracy in which one third of the citizens sigh for the past dictatorship, another wait for the Soviet one, and the last are conforming with the next of the Christian Democrats.

In his pieces, he pokes fun both at anti-fascists ("There is who believe to be an anti-fascist only because Fascism never noticed him") and ex-fascists reused in the new system ("There is a question we must never say, 'Where we have met before?'").

Longanesi was also a staunch anti-communist. During the 1948 election, fearing a victory of the Soviet-sponsored Popular Democratic Front, Longanesi and Montanelli campaigned for the "less worse" Christian Democracy (DC), printing and publishing pamphlets, fliers, posters and hosting Radio Garibaldi, an illegal FM transmission in Milan. After the defeat of the Front, Longanesi left Il Libraio, and in 1950 founded the magazine Il Borghese, collaborating with Montanelli, Giovanni Ansaldo, Giuseppe Prezzolini, Giovanni Spadolini, Alberto Savinio, Mario Tedeschi, Ennio Flaiano, Colette Rosselli, Irene Brin, Goffredo Parise, Mario Missiroli and Piero Buscaroli. In Longanesi's view, Il Borghese should be an expression of a new right-wing anti-communist movement, who he named "Brothers of Italy's League", and organized political circles in several cities. The movement grew rapidly, attracting both unsatisfied voters and those who had been excluded from the 1950s economic miracle, especially farmers. Longanesi and his followers feared that the new media culture and consumerism would destroy traditions, disfigure the Italian landscape and brutalize culture. They also criticized the nullification of classes. Longanesi was harshly critical of the government, calling it unable to balance old traditions and modernity, and of the democratic policy of universal suffrage, stating:

The danger to democracies is universal suffrage to the masses. Giving liberty to the masses means losing liberty.

In the early 1950s, Longanesi tried to transform his movement into a large right-wing party, formed by former Fascists, monarchists, Catholics, liberals and conservatives. He also visited Achille Lauro, mayor of Naples and advocate of the Monarchist National Party, to convince him to join and finance the movement, but Lauro's refusal and Longanesi's lack of political ambition lead the project to fail. However, Longanesi still supported the idea of a national party, and in 1955 he organized a conference titled "What is the right[-wing] in Italy?".

His criticisms both of government and of neo-fascists led to his isolation. In 1956, Monti proposed separation between Il Borghese and Longanesi & Co., and Longanesi's refusal was used to justify ousting him from the administration council. Due to an unknown connection in Confindustria, as reported by Ansaldo, Longanesi was able to maintain Il Borghese by himself, paying ₤5,000,000. Ansaldo later always claimed that Monti's operation was forced by governing pressures, especially from President Giovanni Gronchi, a left-leaning Christian Democrat who personally disliked Longanesi and Il Borghese, and hoped that without money it would be closed and Longanesi ruined.

On 27 September 1957, Longanesi suffered a heart attack while in his office. It was reported that his last words were: "That is, exactly as I always hoped: quickly and among my things".

He died soon after being transported to a clinic. His death was grieved by his few living friends, including Benedetti; Montanelli, future founder of Il Giornale; and Spadolini, future first non-Christian Democrat Prime Minister of the Italian Republic.

== Personal life ==
On 18 February 1939, shortly after the closure of Omnibus, Longanesi married Maria Spadini, daughter of Armando Spadini, whom he knew through Vincenzo Cardarelli, former L'Italiano journalist. In their marriage Longanesi had three children: Virginia (born 19 December 1939), Caterina (born 25 December 1941) and Paolo (born 6 April 1945).

While at home, Longanesi explored his passion for painting, causing some arguments with his wife for his surrealistic works. He believed in traditional and superstitious cures, such as using rabbit skin to treat sciatica.

== Works ==
=== Books ===
- Vade-mecum del perfetto fascista seguito da dieci assiomi per il milite ovvero Avvisi ideali (1926)
- Cinque anni di rivoluzione (1927)
- L'Almanacco di Strapaese, with Gino Maccari (1928)
- Vecchio Sport (extract) (1935)
- Piccolo dizionario borghese, with Vitaliano Brancati (1941)
- Parliamo dell'elefante: frammenti di un diario (1947)
- In piedi e seduti (1919–1943) (1948)
- Il mondo cambia. Storia di cinquant'anni (1949)
- Una vita. Romanzo (1949)
- Il destino ha cambiato cavallo (1951)
- Un morto fra noi (1952)
- Ci salveranno le vecchie zie? (1953)
- L'onesto Signor Bianchi (1953)
- Lettera alla figlia del tipografo (1957)
- La sua signora. Taccuino di Leo Longanesi (1957)
- Me ne vado. Ottantun incisioni in legno (1957)
- L'italiano in guerra, 1915–1918 (1965, posthumous)
- I Borghesi Stanchi (1973, posthumous)
- Il Generale Stivalone (2007, posthumous)
- Faust a Bologna (2013, posthumous)
- Morte dell'Imperatore (2016, posthumous)

=== Stage ===
- Due Servi, with Mino Maccari (1924)
- Una conferenza (1942)
- Il commendatore (1942)
- Il suo cavallo (1944)
- La colpa è dell'anticamera (1946)

=== Film ===
- Heartbeat, with Mario Camerini and Ivo Perilli (1939)
- Dieci minuti di vita, with Steno and Ennio Flaiano (uncompleted, 1943)
- Quartieri alti, with Steno, Renato Castellani, Mario Soldati and Ercole Patti (1945)

=== Drawings ===
- A gun aimed on Italy
- Literary graphic (1)
- Literary graphic (2)

=== Commercials ===
- Supercortemaggiore (Agip)
- Agipgas (Agip)
- Vespa (Vespa)
- Moto Guzzi (Moto Guzzi)
- Adolph's (Adolph's)

== Bibliography ==
- Montanelli, Indro; Staglieno, Marcello (1984). Leo Longanesi. Milan: Rizzoli. ISBN 9788817428019.
- Appella, Giuseppe; Longanesi, Paolo; Vallora, Marco (1996). Leo Longanesi: 1905-1957 : editore, scrittore, artista. Milan: Longanesi. ISBN 9788830413924.
- Albonetti, Piero; Fanti, Corrado (1997). Longanesi e italiani. Faenza: Edit Faenza. ISBN 9788881520404.
- Liucci, Raffele (2002). L'Italia borghese di Longanesi. Padua: Marsilio. ISBN 9788831780612.
- Ungari, Andrea (2007). Un conservatore scomodo: Leo Longanesi dal fascismo alla Repubblica. Florence: Le lettere. ISBN 9788860870537.
- Giubilei, Francesco (2015). Leo Longanesi: il borghese conservatore. Città di Castello: Odoya. ISBN 9788862882903.
- Liucci, Raffaele (2016). Leo Longanesi. Un borghese corsaro tra fascismo e Repubblica. Rome: Carocci editore. ISBN 9788843077625.
- Mazzuca, Alberto (2017). Penne al vetriolo. I grandi giornalisti raccontano la Prima Repubblica. Bologna: Minerva. ISBN 9788873818496.

== Sources ==
- "Longanési, Leo". Treccani.it (in Italian). Enciclopedia on line, Istituto dell'Enciclopedia Italiana.
