= Piero Buscaroli =

Italian musicologist (1930–2016)

- Born: 21 August 1930; Imola, Italy
- Died: 15 February 2016 (aged 85); Bologna, Italy
- Occupation: Musicologist

Piero Buscaroli (21 August 1930 – 15 February 2016) was an Italian musicologist, journalist and essayist.

== Life ==
Born in Imola, the son of a Latinist, Buscaroli studied organ, harmony and counterpoint at the Conservatorio Giovanni Battista Martini, and later he graduated in law with a thesis about the Italian legal history.

From 1955 to 1977, Buscaroli collaborated with the magazine Il Borghese, writing articles of music criticism, international politics and modern history and often using the pseudonym "Hans Sachs". From 1972 to 1975 he was director of the newspaper Roma, and in 1979 he began a long collaboration with the newspaper Il Giornale directed by Indro Montanelli, where he used the pseudonym Piero Santerno for his not-music-related articles.

Buscaroli wrote several books on the history of music, notably Bach (1985), which got over twenty editions, Beethoven (2004), a 1350 pages book which was the result of five years of continuous study, and La morte di Mozart ("The death of Mozart", 1996), in which he suggested that Mozart's Requiem was not left unfinished because of the death of its author, but because of a deliberate choice of Mozart himself, due to reluctance on his part to fulfill the contractual clause, imposed on him by the client, which prevented him to claim authorship of his work.

== Sources ==
- "Buscaroli, Piero". Treccani.it (in Italian). Enciclopedia on line, Istituto dell'Enciclopedia Italiana.
