= Irene Brin =

Italian journalist and writer (1911–1969)

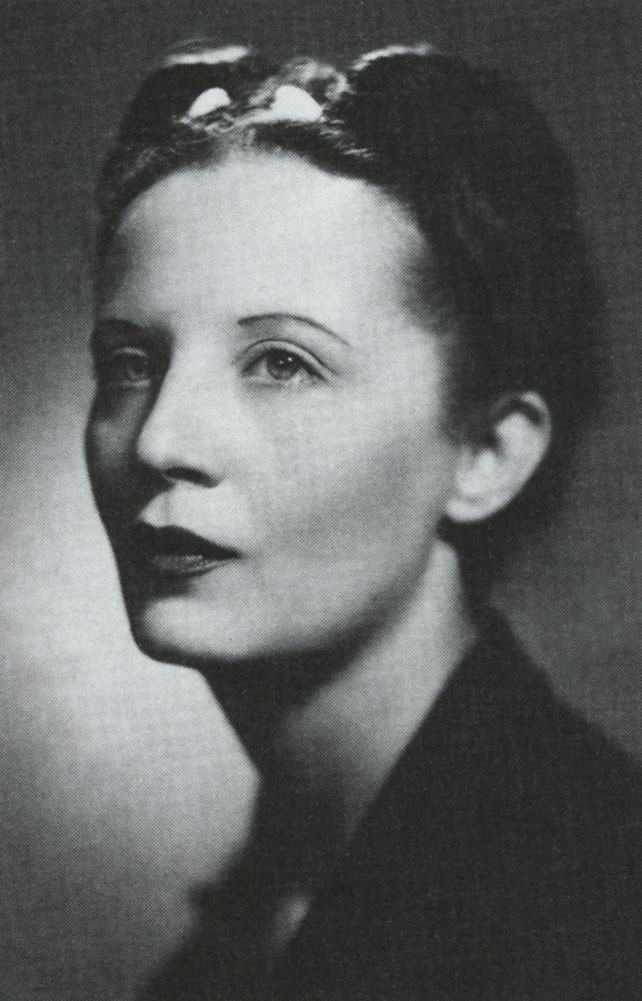
- Irene Brin
- Born: Maria Vittoria Rossi; 14 June 1911; Rome, Italy
- Died: 31 May 1969 (aged 57); Bordighera, Italy
- Occupations: writer, fashion journalist and special consultant, gallerist
- Years active: 1934–69
- Employer(s): Harper’s Bazaar, Omnibus, La Settimana Incom illustrata, etc.
- Spouse: Gaspero del Corso
- Parents: General Vincenzo Rossi (deceased); Maria Pia Luzzato (deceased)
- Relatives: Paolo Rossi (1900-1985) (cousin); Francesca Duranti (grand cousin)(deceased)
- Awards: Knight of Order of Merit of the Italian Republic
- Website: www.giardinoirene.it/italiano/la_vita.htm

Irene Brin (born Maria Victoria Rossi, 14 June 1911 – 31 May 1969) was an Italian fashion journalist, writer and art dealer.

== Biography ==
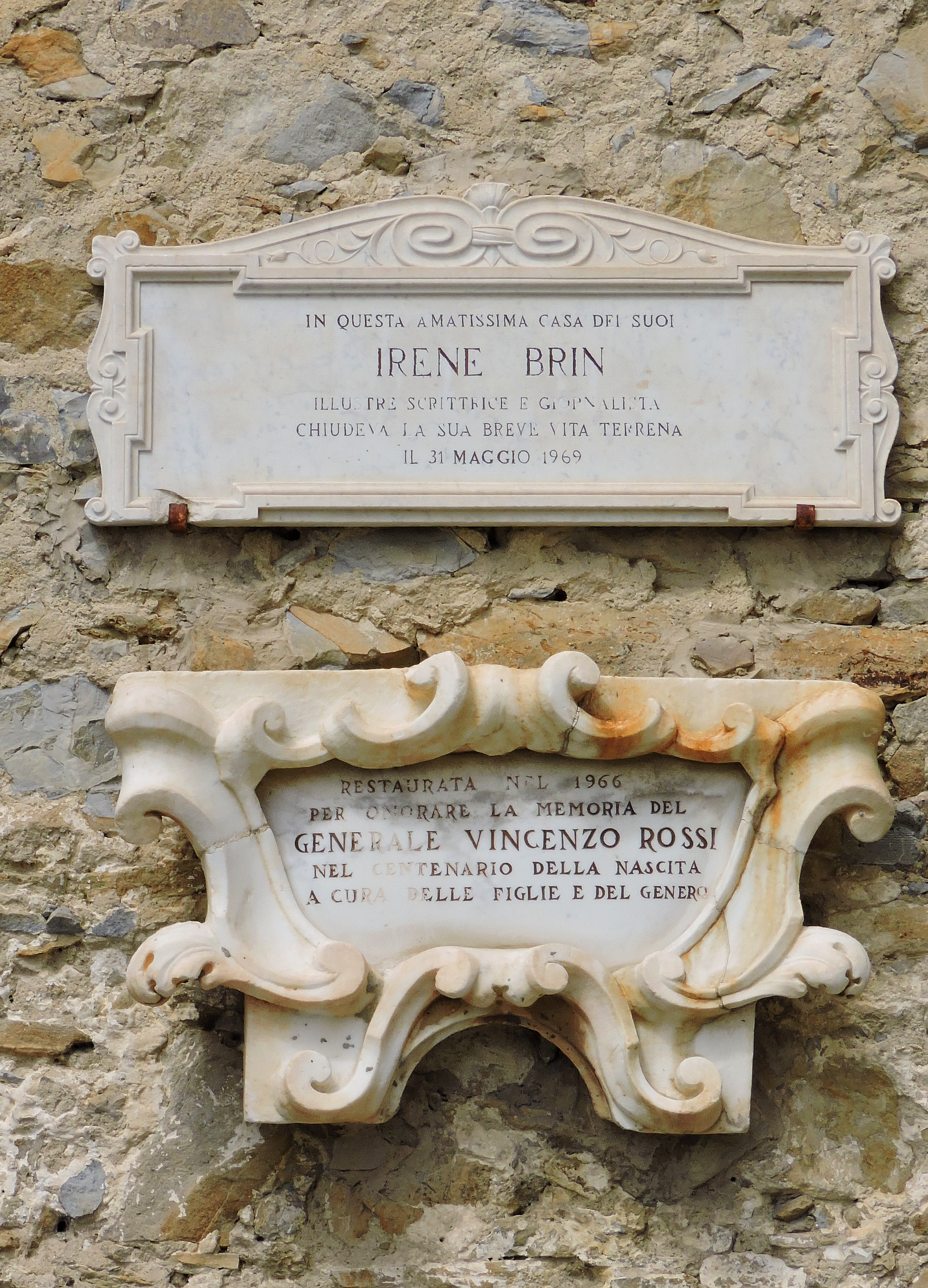
Memorial plate in Sasso (Bordighera)

Irene Brin was born in Rome from a well-educated Ligurian family of progressive views. Her father was general Vincenzo Rossi, author of two popular military treaties: War in the Mountains (1902) and The English Expedition in Tibet (1905). Her mother, Maria Pia Luzzatto, was born and raised in Vienna from a Jewish family, and contributed transmitting to her daughters her passion for languages (she was fluent in Italian, French, German and English), art and literature.

Brin was also the niece of the criminal lawyer Francesco Rossi (1863-1948), who was mayor of Bordighera from 1901 to 1907, and the cousin of the lawyer Paolo Rossi who became minister of education, as well as chairman of the Antimafia Commission and President of the Constitutional Court. She was also a removed cousin of the daughter of Paolo Rossi, the writer Maria Francesca Rossi, known as Francesca Duranti.

=== Early years and the meeting with Gaspero del Corso ===
In 1934, at the age of twenty, Brin made her debut in the columns of the newspaper "Il lavoro” (The Work) in Genoa edited by Giovanni Ansaldo. In 1937 Ansaldo recommended her to Leo Longanesi as a columnist for the weekly Omnibus. Initially she wrote under the pseudonym "Mariù", but later changed to "Oriane" as a tribute to Marcel Proust's character Oriane de Guermantes. She eventually adopted the name Irene Brin.

Brin's fiancé, Carlo Roddolo, died on 18 February 1937 in Addis Ababa. A few years later during a dance at the hotel Excelsior in Rome, she met Gaspero del Corso, a young officer with whom she discovered to share an intense passion for Proust, art and travelling. The two married shortly afterwards. In 1941 Brin wrote her first book "Olga in Belgrade", inspired by her experience during the war in Yugoslavia mainly in Slovenia and Ljubljana from 1941 to 1942.

=== War ===
In 1943 the couple returned to Rome. Following the armistice, Gaspero del Corso was considered a deserter and he then hid in the house, along with forty other officers and disbanded soldiers, to avoid the Nazi troops roundups. At that time Brin and del Corso's only income came from Irene's translation work which was scarce due to her refusal to work for publishers who were collaborating with the Nazi occupying forces. As such she was forced to sell their wedding gifts, including an alligator bag and prints and drawings by artists such as Picasso, Matisse, Morandi ... Shortly after Brin found a job as a saleswoman in the art library La Margherita, assisted by her husband who, under the false identity of Ottorino Maggiore, helped her procuring books and drawings.

=== L'Obelisco ===
During her time at La Margherita, Brin met a then unknown artist, Renzo Vespignani. Through their connections, Brin and del Corso were able to sell a significant amount of his work, an episode that prompted them to rent a room in Via Sistina 146 and found L'Obelisco gallery of Gaspero and Maria del Corso in 1946. The gallery inaugurated with a solo presentation of Giorgio Morandi. Parallel to established artists like Giorgio de Chirico, Salvador Dalí, Pablo Picasso, Bruno Caruso and Giacomo Balla, Brin and del Corso also exhibited emerging talents like Alberto Burri, Zoran Mušič and Lucio Fontana. Following a trip to New York, Brin established close links with the Brooklyn Museum and the Museum of Modern Art, introducing to the Italian art scene artists like Alexander Calder, Francis Bacon and Robert Rauschenberg.

=== La Settimana Incom ===
In 1946, parallel to her activities at Gallery L'Obelisco, Brin began collaborating with La Settimana Incom an illustrated newsreel edited by of Luigi Barzini Jr. Her surveys, initially aimed at dispensing advice to readers about style, social behaviour and fashion trends, resulted in short pieces laced with irony and literary quotations. A few of her contributions were signed with the pseudonym Contessa Clara Ràdjanny von Skèwitch, a fictional old aristocratic lady exiled from an unspecified country behind the Iron Curtain who would often recount her meetings with Royals and famous writers. Countess Clara later inspired Italian actor Alberto Sordi's parody character Count Claro.

=== Harper's Bazaar ===
In 1950, during a trip to New York, Brin was stopped by a lady in Park Avenue who asked her where she bought the classy dress she was wearing. (It was designed by Alberto Fabiani). The woman in question turned out to be Diana Vreeland, then editor in chief of Harper's Bazaar. Brin and Vreeland became good acquaintances, and Brin became the first Italian contributor to the magazine, introducing Italian fashion to an international audience. In 1951 Brin worked actively to the success of the first Italian fashion show organized by the Marquis Giovanni Battista Giorgini at his private residence in Villa Torrigiani in Via de 'Serragli in Florence. She also collaborated to the second edition that took place in July 1952 in the White Hall of Palazzo Pitti.

=== Final days ===
Despite being affected by an incurable disease, Brin continued her work activities and travelling. In the spring of 1969, she went to Strasbourg to visit a local art exhibitions. On the way back, not being able to continue the trip to Rome, she decided to stop in her family house in Bordighera, where she died on 31 May. The Gallery l'Obelisco continued until 1978. The final exhibition was a tribute to Tina Modotti. Its archive was bought by Giuseppe Cassetti who sold it to the National Gallery in Rome in 2000.

=== Honours ===
Cordone di gran Croce OMRI BAR

On 2 June 1955 Brin was knighted the “Grand Cross of Order of Merit of the Italian Republic” by the president of the Italian Republic, Giovanni Gronchi, for her contribution to “the success and development of Italian fashion in the world”.

== Bibliography ==
- Olga a Belgrado, Vallecchi, Florence, 1943
- Usi e Costumi 1920-1940, Donatello de Luigi, Rome, 1944
- Le Visite, Casa Editrice Partenia, Rome, 1944
- Images de Lautrec, Carlo Bestetti Edizioni d’Arte/Collezione dell’Obelisco, Rome, 1947
- Femmes de Lautrec, Carlo Bestetti Edizioni d’Arte/Collezione dell’Obelisco, Rome, 1954
- I Segreti del Successo, Colombo Editore, Rome, 1954 (as Contessa Clara)
- Il Galateo, Colombo Editore, Rome, 1959 (as Contessa Clara)
- Cose viste 1938-1939, Sellerio Editore, Palermo, 1994
