= Sanford H. Roth =

American photographer (1906–1962)

Sanford H. Roth (1906–1962) was an American photographer whose work has appeared in Time, Life, Look, Fortune, Paris Match, Elle, Der Stern, Harper's Bazaar, Vogue, Oggi, People, and other publications. His photographs of James Dean still appear regularly in books, magazines, print and other works all over the world.

== Biography ==
Roth was born and grew up in Brooklyn, New York. His profession of managing chain stores brought him to Los Angeles, California in the 1930s, where he met and married Beulah Spigelgass. In 1946, he quit his career to pursue his real passion—photography—and the Roths moved to Europe. Soon Roth, also known as "Sandy", became a photojournalist not only to the film industry, but to other notable people of his time.

== Photographer ==
The Roths traveled between Hollywood, Europe, and other locations around the globe. They shared a passion for cats, shopping, clothes, Paris, Rome, flea markets, Roman antiquities, art, and people. Roth's photographs became synonymous with a sense of quality and intimacy capturing unreachable celebrities and artists in moments when their guard was down.

Sandy with his wife Beulah, met, entertained, photographed and became friends with the who's who of post World War II Europe and Hollywood. Those photographs included: Albert Einstein, Alfred Hitchcock, James Dean (a personal friend), Judy Garland, Joan Crawford, Pablo Picasso, Henri Matisse, Audrey Hepburn, Aldous Huxley, Noël Coward, Jimmy Stewart, Christopher Isherwood, Louis Armstrong, Paul Newman, Gino Severini, Blaise Cendrars, Alberto Moravia, Moise Kisling, Elizabeth Taylor, Rock Hudson, Grace Kelly, Danny Kaye, Romy Schneider, Anna Magnani, Jack Lemmon, Deborah Kerr, Igor Stravinsky, Dimitri Mitropoulos, Sophia Loren, Darius Milhaud, Irene and Frederic Joliot-Curie, Edwin Hubble, Jean Renoir, Alain Delon, John Wayne, George Antheil, Afro Basaldella, Alberto Burri, Edward G. Robinson, Jean Cocteau, Peter Ustinov, Rossana Podesta, Darryl Zanuck, George Stevens, Colette, Groucho Marx, Tennessee Williams, Ava Gardner, Fred Zinnemann, Cary Grant, and many others.

In 1955, Edward Steichen selected Roth's photograph for the section 'Childhood Magic' of the world-touring Museum of Modern Art exhibition The Family of Man that was seen by 9 million visitors and disseminated in a popular catalogue that is still in print today. The graphically striking high-angle photograph shows children running on the concrete apron of a drainage canal marked out with black stripes.

== James Dean ==
Roth first met James Dean on the set of Giant and they immediately became friends. Roth would often tell James Dean stories of he and his wife's travels all over Europe. Dean often visited the home of Sandy and Beulah and there are published photographs of Dean playing with their cat. Dean treated the Roths as adoptive parents. Poignantly, Sanford Roth was in James Dean's Ford station wagon driving behind Dean's new Porsche Spyder on the way to the Salinas Road Races on September 30, 1955, when Dean died in a late afternoon traffic accident. Roth took the now famous post-accident photographs. Beulah Roth denied that Sandy ever took any photos of Dean trapped in the wrecked Spyder.

== Works ==
Roth's professional credits are extensive and his photography was featured in a number of widely circulated magazines, including; Time, Life, Look, Fortune, Paris Match, Elle, Der Stern, Harper's Bazaar, Vogue, Oggi and People.

== Collections ==
Among the private collectors who have owned the work of Roth are Pablo Picasso, Jean Cocteau, Colette, and Igor Stravinsky. Other collectors included Francesca Robinson Sanchez (granddaughter of actor Edward G. Robinson), Jill Robinson (née Schary), Princess Rachel Starraba (Rome), Gino and Nino Franchina (Rome), Peter Ustinov, Claudia de Guere (France), Mr. Seita Ohnishi (Japan), Leonard Spigelgass (U.S.), L. Fritz Gruber (Germany) and many others.

Sanford Roth's work is held in the permanent public collections of:

- Museum of Modern Art, New York City, New York
- Israel Museum, Jerusalem, Israel
- Los Angeles County Museum of Art, Los Angeles, California
- Academy of Motion Picture Arts and Sciences, Beverly Hills, California
- Musee De La Photographie Ville de Mougins le Maire, Alpes-Maritimes, France
- Norton Simon Museum of Art, Pasadena, California
- Getty Museum Research Center, Los Angeles, California
- Museum Ludwig, Cologne, Germany
- Clervaux Castle, Luxembourg

== Death and legacy ==
Roth died of a heart attack in Rome, Italy, while preparing to work on the film Cleopatra in 1962. He was survived by his wife Beulah. While living, she transferred ownership of many of the original photographs to Francesca Robinson Sanchez, granddaughter of Edward G. Robinson. However, in 1986, many of Roth's images and negatives of James Dean were sold to a Japanese businessman, Seita Ohnishi of Kobe. Ohnishi is the businessman responsible for providing Cholame, the location of Dean's accident, with a stainless steel sculpture, made by Yasuo Mizui to further commemorate the iconic actor.
