= Omnibus (magazine) =

Cultural magazine in Italy (1937–1939)

- Editor-in-chief: Leo Longanesi
- Categories: Illustrated magazine
- Frequency: Weekly
- Publisher: Rizzoli
- Founder: Leo Longanesi
- Founded: 1937
- First issue: 3 April 1937
- Final issue: January 1939
- Country: Italy
- Based in: Milan
- Language: Italian

Omnibus was a weekly illustrated general cultural magazine published in Milan, Italy, between 1937 and 1939. Its subtitle was settimanale di attualità politica e letteraria. It is described as the "father of Italian magazines", especially in regard to the use of photographs and images. The magazine was closed by the fascist authorities.

== History and profile ==
The first issue of Omnibus appeared on 3 April 1937, and the publisher was Rizzoli based in Milan. Leo Longanesi was the founder and editor-in-chief of the magazine which featured articles about the current events, literary works, theatre and music reviews, interviews with Hollywood stars and movie reviews, sports and fashion. These articles were accompanied by photographs and photocollages. The magazine was published on a weekly basis.

Irene Brin published articles in the magazine using the pseudonym Mariù. Elio Vittorini published articles on American literature in Omnibus, and a collection of these articles was published in his anthology entitled Americana in 1941. Another contributor was Ennio Flaiano. The following also published articles in the magazine: Indro Montanelli, Alberto Moravia, Vitaliano Brancati, Mario Soldati, Mario Pannunzio, Arrigo Benedetti, Alberto Savinio, Eugenio Montale and Dino Buzzati who published short stories using a pseudonym, Giovanni Drogo.

Omnibus was closed by the fascist administration in January 1939 and succeeded by another Rizzoli magazines, Tutto and Oggi.
