= Longanesi =

Italian literary book publisher

Longanesi & C.
- Parent company: Mauri Spagnol Publishing Group
- Status: active
- Founded: 1946; 79 years ago
- Founder: Leo Longanesi; Giovanni Monti
- Country of origin: Italy
- Headquarters location: Milan
- Official website: www.longanesi.it

Longanesi, also known as Longanesi & C., is a publishing house based in Milan, Italy. It was founded in 1946 by Leo Longanesi and industrialist Giovanni Monti. It initially got a large success thanks to some editorial series such as La buona società and La gaia scienza.

After a period of crisis, Longanesi was relaunched by Mario Spagnol (1930–1999) through the acquisition of some prestigious publishing houses such as Guanda, Salani and Corbaccio and through some successful ventures in the field of paperbacks.

== Book series ==
- Biblioteca di Narratori
- Biblioteca Longanesi & C.
- La Buona Società
- Il Cammeo
- I Cento Libri
- L'Elefante
- Fantapocket
- La Fantascienza
- La Fronda
- La Gaja Scienza (also referred to as: La Gaia Scienza)
- I Gialli Longanesi & C.
- I Gialli Proibiti
- La Ginestra
- Guide Pratiche
- I Grandi Libri d'Azione
- I Libri Pocket
- I Marmi
- Il Mondo Nuovo
- Il Meglio
- Opere di Giovanni Comisso
- Piccola Biblioteca Longanesi
- I Pocket Presentano: Avenger
- Psico
- Le Spade
- Spia Contro Spia
- Spy Story
- Storie e Avventure
- I Super Pocket
- Suspense!
- Varia
- La Vostra Via
- Vostra Via Sportiva
