= L'Italiano (magazine) =

Italian literary, arts and political magazine (1926–1942)

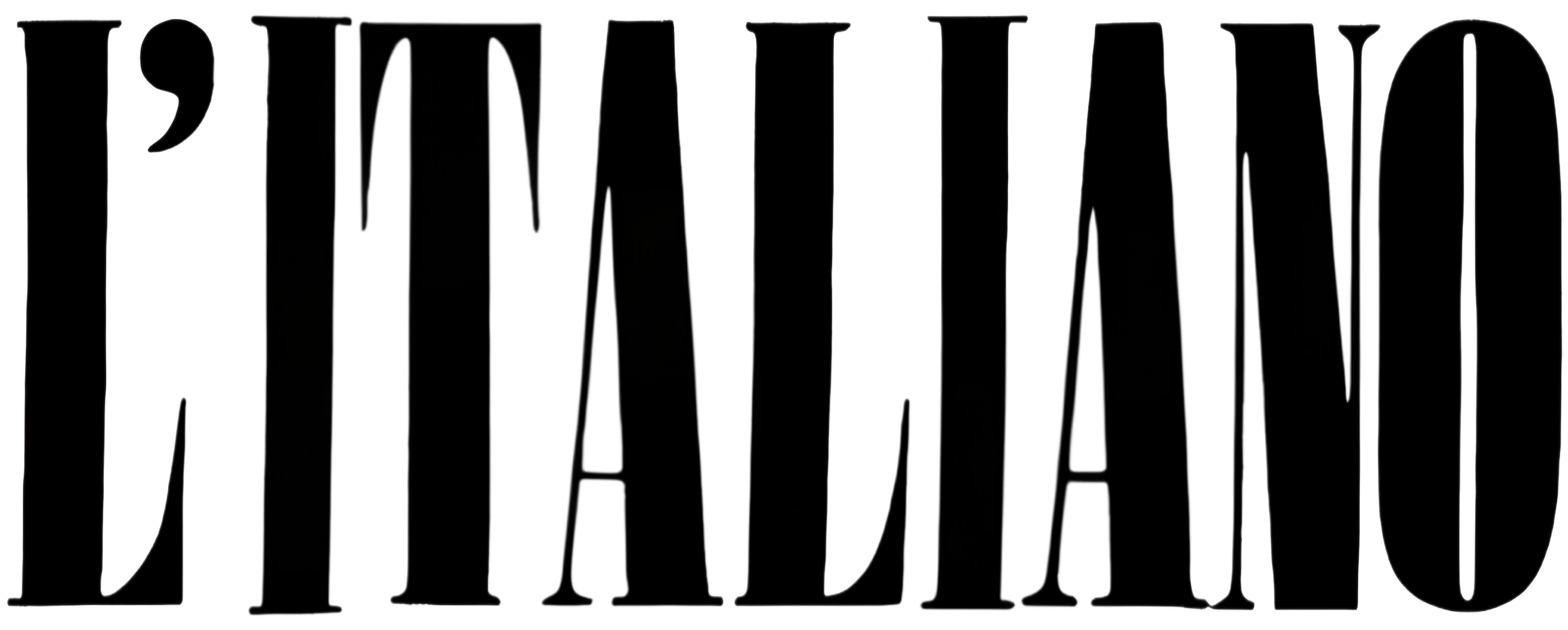
- Editor-in-chief: Leo Longanesi
- Categories: Literary magazine; Arts magazine; Political magazine
- Frequency: Weekly
- Publisher: L'Italiano Editore
- Founder: Leo Longanesi
- Founded: 1926
- First issue: 14 January 1926
- Final issue: 1942
- Country: Italy
- Based in: Bologna; Rome
- Language: Italian
- OCLC: 173994792

L'Italiano was a weekly literary and arts magazine that existed between 1926 and 1942 in Italy. Its full title was L'italiano: rivista settimanale della gente fascista. It is one of the magazines founded and edited by the well-known Italian journalist Leo Longanesi. Its subtitle was Foglio della Rivoluzione Fascista (Italian: Publication of the Fascist Revolution), and its motto was "Mussolini is always right" which was also adopted and employed by the Fascist regime.

== History and profile ==
L'Italiano was established by Leo Longanesi in Bologna in 1926. Its first issue appeared on 14 January that year. In the initial period it was published on a biweekly basis, and the first eight issues heavily covered political writings. From 1927 L'Italiano Editore founded by Leo Longanesi became the publisher of L'Italiano. The headquarters of L'Italiano was moved to Rome. It ceased publication at the end of 1942.
