= Collegio Borromeo =

Building in Pavia, Italy

Almo Collegio Borromeo
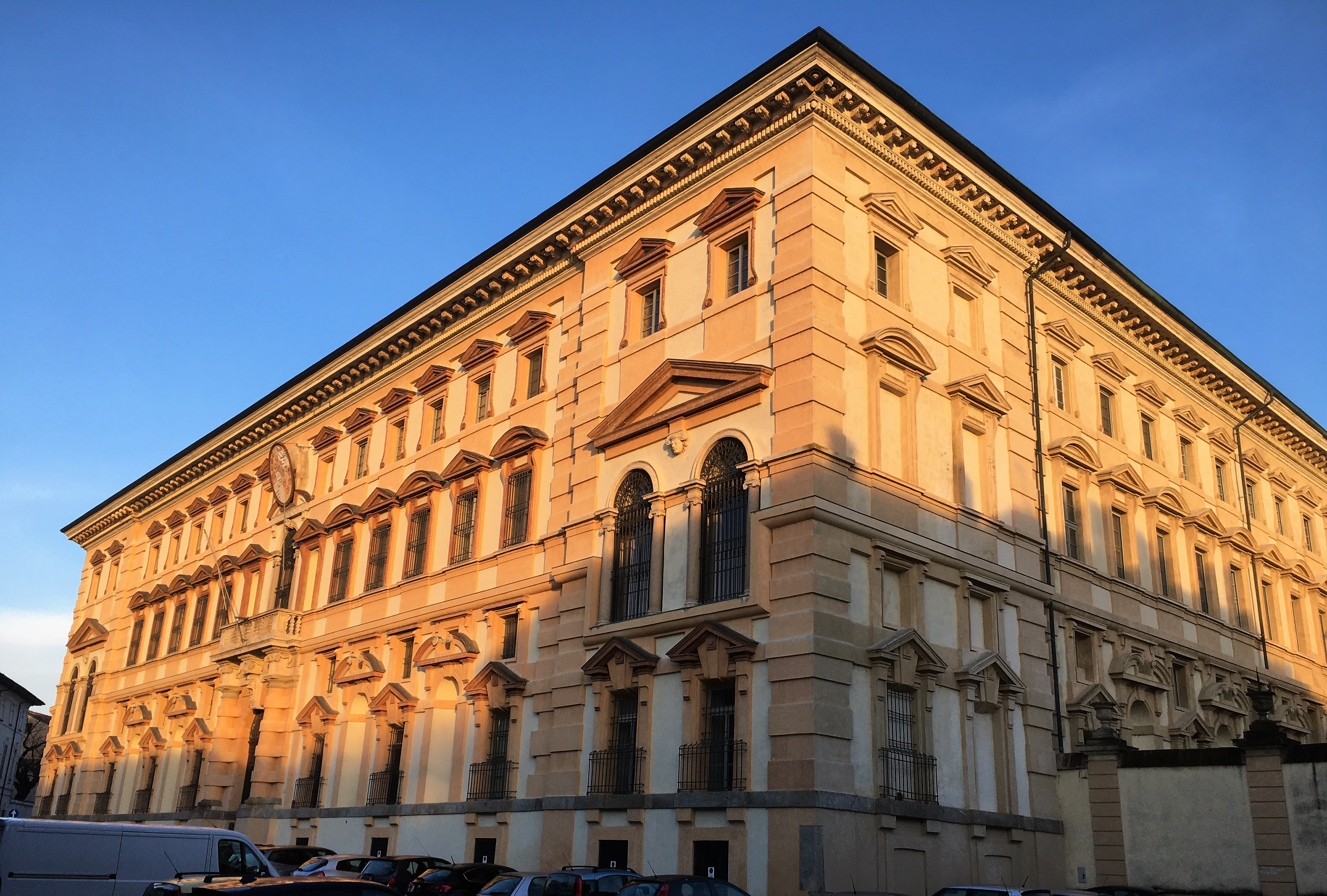
- Motto: Humilitas
- Motto in English: Humility
- Type: Highly qualified cultural institute
- Established: 1561
- Affiliations: CCULR
- Rector: Don Alberto Lolli
- Students: 140 (2011)
- Location: Pavia, Italy; 45°10′49″N 9°9′40.7″E
- Website: www.collegioborromeo.it

The Almo Collegio Borromeo is a private university hall of residence (collegio) in Pavia, region of Lombardy, Italy. It is classified as a "highly qualified cultural institute" by the Ministry of Education, Universities and Research and is the oldest such institution remaining in operation in Italy. Together with Collegio Ghislieri – with which a sharp goliardic rivalry has developed during the centuries – it is one of two colleges in Pavia with historical heritage. The building that houses the college was designed by Pellegrino Tibaldi, and overlooks the Ticino, surrounded by landscaped gardens and the Borromeo Gardens. Vasari described it as a "palace of knowledge" ("palazzo per la Sapienza").

The college selects students of the University of Pavia through a rigorous public competition based on tests taken annually. The services offered by the college are not limited to food and housing, but rather are focused on providing training in parallel and integrated with the university: for example, CEGA (Center for General and Applied Ethics) is hosted by the college; along with conferences, presentations of books on current affairs, hosting the chair in theology, and offering countless moments of reflection, in addition to the ever-rich artistic and musical seasons in the life of the college. The college also offers various exchange programmes, with institutions such as Corpus Christi College, Cambridge and the College of Saint Benedict and Saint John's University.

== History ==
Collegio Borromeo was founded in 1561 by the estate of cardinal St. Charles Borromeo which aimed to create an institution to accommodate young promising students experiencing economic hardship. This is still the aim of the Fondazione Collegio Borromeo. On May 10, 2009, the Women's Section was opened in the presence of Minister Mariastella Gelmini and Cardinal Dionigi Tettamanzi; it is intended to accommodate approximately fifty of the most deserving female students from the University of Pavia.

== Rooms ==
The student rooms are divided according to the sides of the building: "Piazza" ("Square") on the western side, facing Piazza Borromeo, "Giardino" ("Garden") on the south side, "Vicolo" ("Lane") on the north side, looking onto Via Cardinal Tosi. The east side is called "Richini", as it is situated on a seventeenth-century garden designed by Francesco Maria Richini, and houses two auditorium-style rooms ("White Room" and "Mural Room") with private upstairs rooms for guests. The rooms are also divided into several levels: "Mezzanino" (mezzanine), "Nobile" (piano nobile), "Paradiso" (second mezzanine) and "Iperuranio" (attic). Also on the south side are "Sangiovannino alto" and "basso" ("Upper" and "Lower"), saved from the Church of San Giovanni in Borgo before demolition in the nineteenth century.

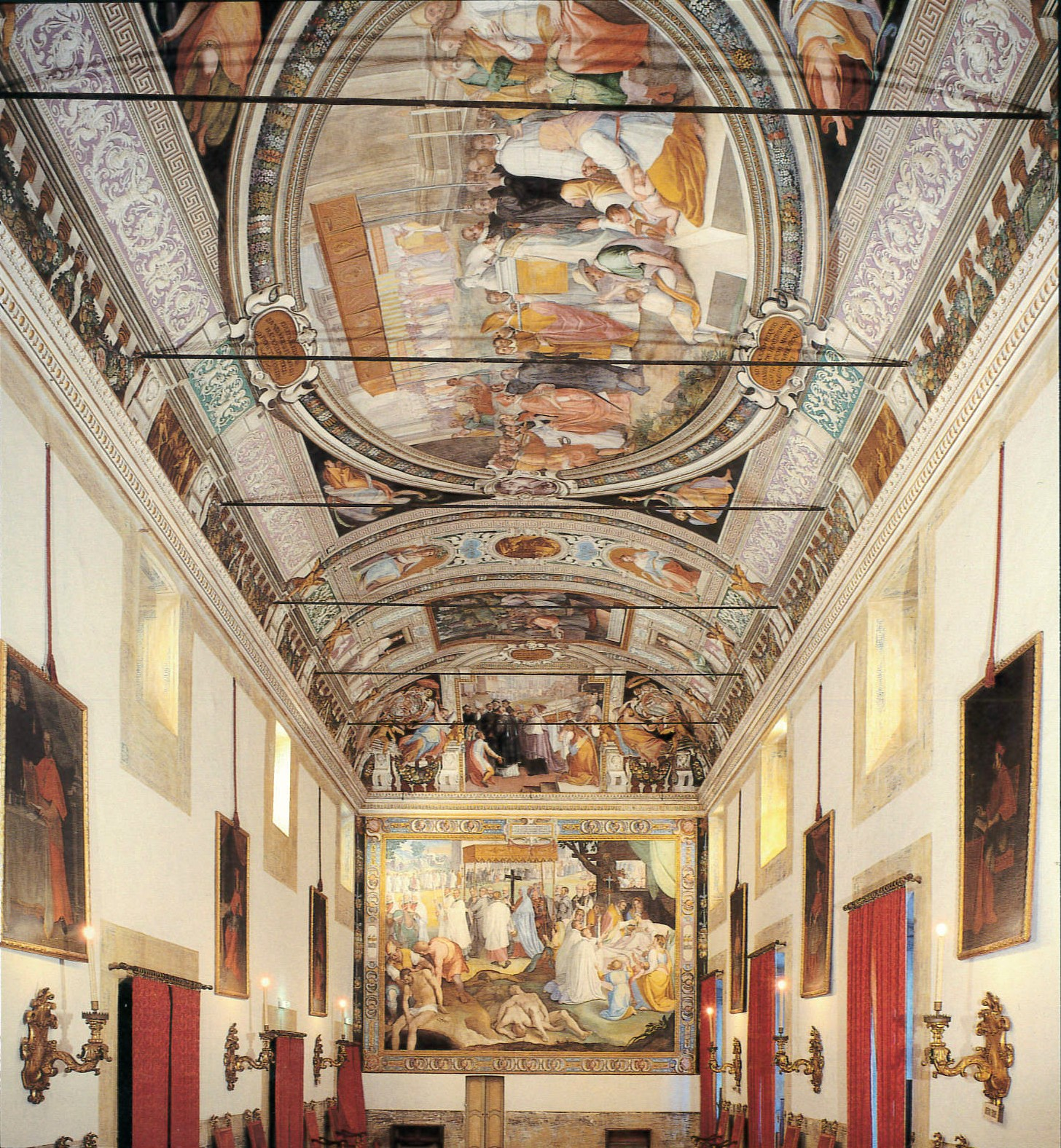
Cesare Nebbia, Federico Zuccari, Salone.

== State rooms ==
The White Room, located on the main floor, on the Francesco Maria Richini side of the College, is used for seminars and conferences. It seats about 100 people and is characterized by high eighteenth-century wooden doors in pastel green and gold foil. Paintings of the patrons of the College, members of the Borromeo family, decorate the walls. The Hall of frescoes, adjacent to the white room, takes its name from a series of frescoes that illustrate different moments in the life of Carlo Borromeo, founder of the College. It has a capacity of about 200 people and is used for congresses, conventions and concerts. On the eastern and western walls, which are not frescoed, hang a series of paintings representing cardinals of the Borromeo family from various eras. The frescoes, due to Cesare Nebbia, Federico Zuccari and aides, were made at the beginning of the 17th century on commission by Federico Borromeo; they cover the entrance wall (North), the back wall (South) and the ceiling of the hall. The larger wall frescoes refer to the cardinal appointment of Charles Borromeo and to various episodes relating to the plague of 1576–1577, known as the "plague of Saint Charles".

== Chapel ==
The Chapel, dedicated to St. Justina, the patron saint of the Borromeo family, and to Saint Charles Borromeo, was completed in 1581 and is regularly officiated. Externally it has an important seventeenth-century marble portal, surmounted by the bust of Saint Charles. The barrel vault is decorated with the oldest frescoes in the Palace, made by the painter Giovanni Battista Muttoni in 1579, in late Mannerist style, and represent four scenes from the Old Testament, inserted in perspective squares and multiple and exuberant frames, full of geometric ornaments, fruit and vegetable borders and grotesque decorations. The walls are frescoed in 1909 by Manlio Oppio, Osvaldo Bignami: the patron saints of the college and university students face the four rounds. The floor is the original sixteenth-century one, in Lombard terracotta, with the typical two-tone veins reminiscent of wood, while the choir was added in the nineteenth century.

== Library and archive ==
The college library is one of the oldest in Pavia, in fact it was built in the second half of the 16th century and has a heritage of more than 40,000 volumes, over 2,300 ancient volumes and 70 periodicals, all active. The Ancient Library Fund: it preserves about 2,000 volumes printed between the 15th and 19th centuries, of the most varied topics (history, law, philosophy, theology, literature and sciences), some of great value, such as the Triumphs and Songbooks by Francesco Petrarca printed in Venice by Bernardino da Novara in 1488 or the edition of I promessi sposi (The Betrothed) enriched with illustrations by Francesco Gonin (1840–1842). The archive of the Collegio Borromeo preserves not only the documentation concerning the institution (including the bull issued by Pope Pius IV on October 15, 1561 with which the college was established), but also part of the archive of the monastery of San Maiolo, the whose landed properties passed to the college in 1564, documentation donated by former students or university professors and the photo library, partially digitized. Among the numerous archival collections we mention: The Possessions Fund (chronological extremes 1320–1900): which collects the documentation concerning both the construction of the college building and the numerous possessions, especially agricultural, of the college and Parchment Fund (982–1776): it preserves 446 parchments, most of them, about 350, coming from the archive of the monastery of San Maiolo and concerning, above all, the landed properties of the monastery.

== Gardens ==
The two gardens of the Collegio reflect the aesthetics and cultural climate of the eras in which they were built. The Italian one, from the 16th-17th century, is characterized by low regular hedges arranged geometrically, symmetrical with respect to the central axis that goes from the iron portal to the fountain, both by Francesco Maria Richini. The English one, from the 19th century, has an irregular arrangement and the plant species are different and differently placed, to produce a "natural" effect dear to the romantic aesthetic. The Borromean gardens, a large green area to the east of the College, isolate it from the surrounding urban context and make the two gardens an oasis of peace and silence set in the city of Pavia.

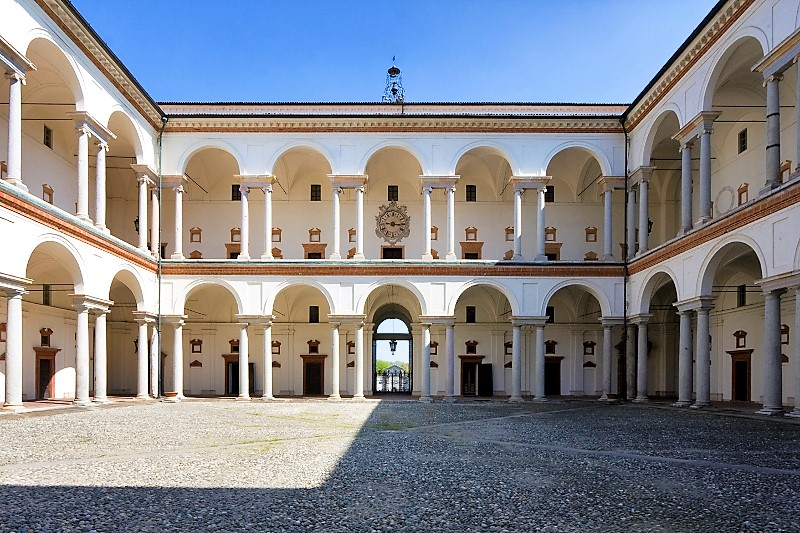
The inner courtyard.

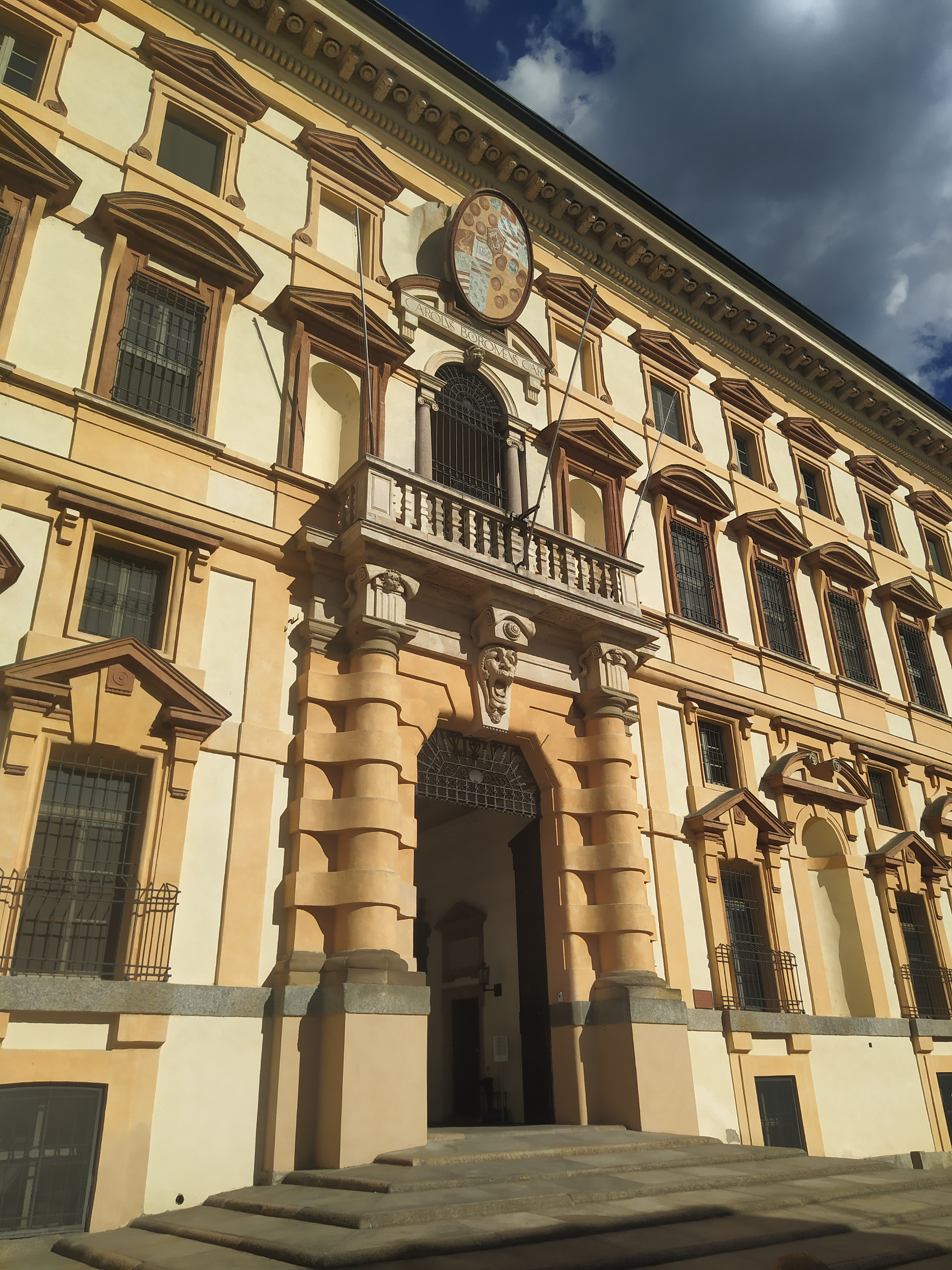
The portal.

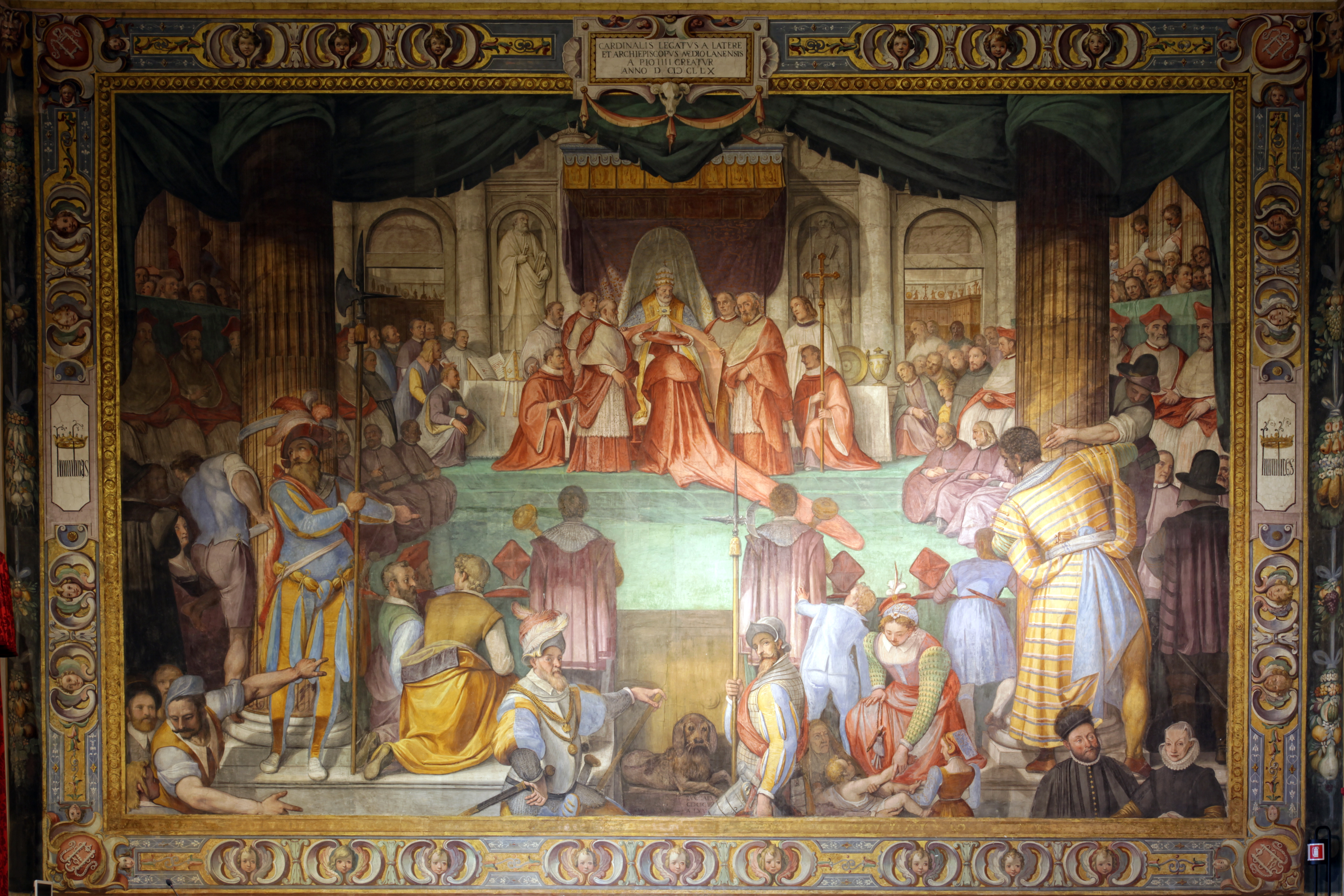
Federico Zuccari, Imposition of the cardinal's hat on Saint Charles Borromeo.

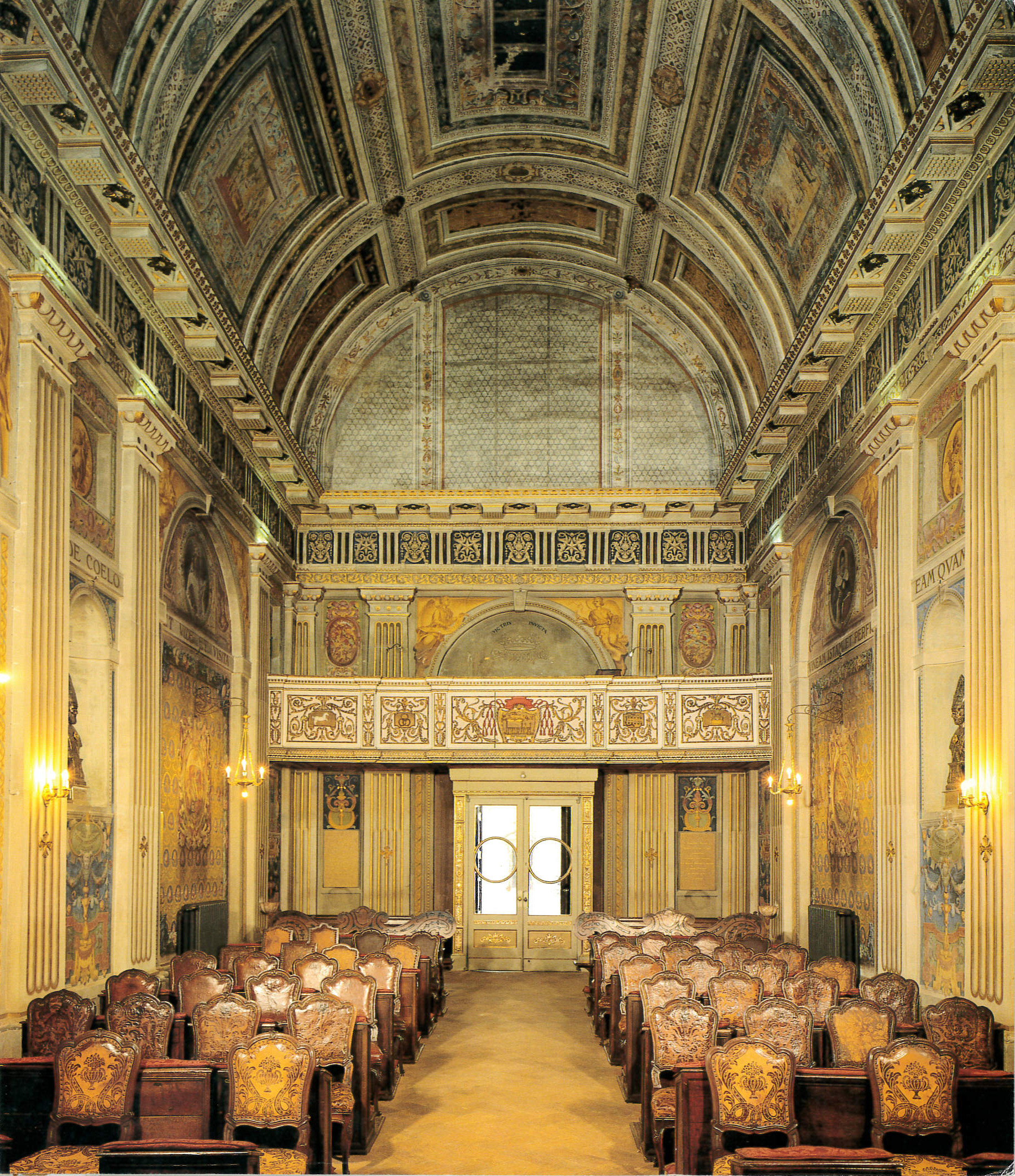
The chapel.

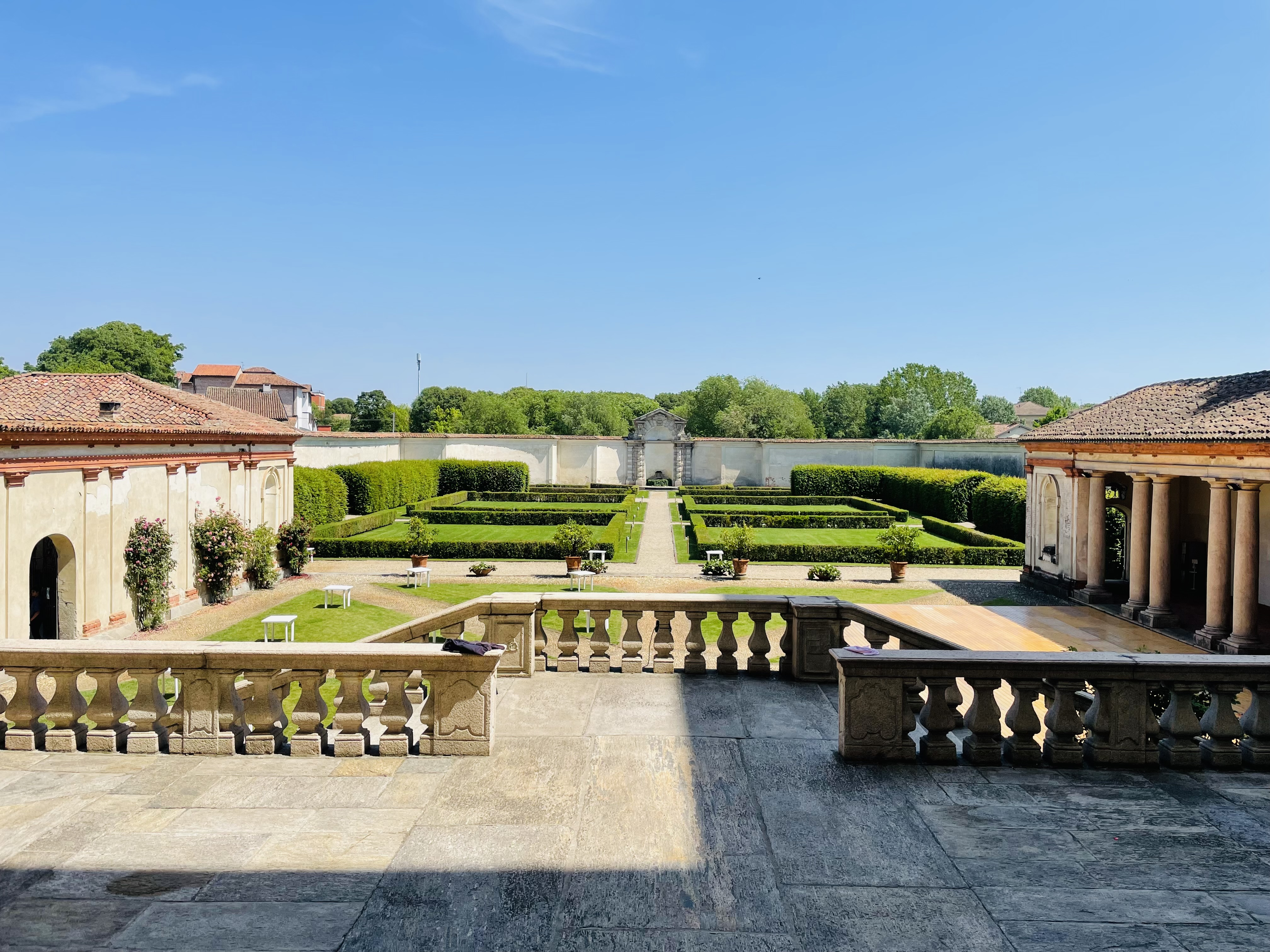
Italian garden.

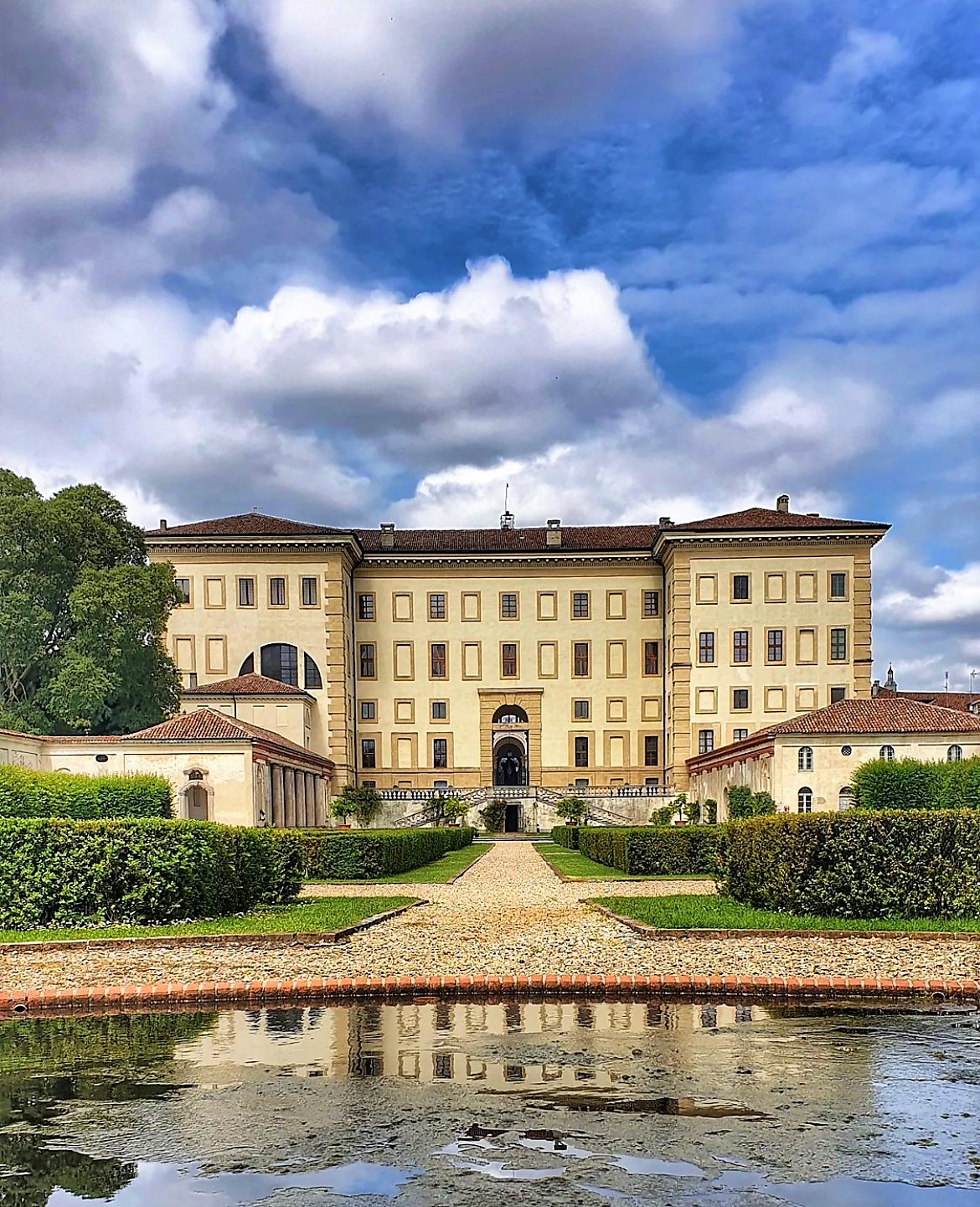
Italian garden.

== Horti Borromaici ==
The Horti Borromaici are a vast urban park (which extends for about 3.5 hectares) located within the historic center of Pavia, between the Collegio and the Ticino, where the natural habitat meets contemporary art, knowledge and social inclusion. They were born in the second half of the sixteenth century, when they began to be exploited for the cultivation of fruit plants, vineyards and garden products necessary for the sustenance of the students of the college. The Horti retained an agricultural destination until the second half of the twentieth century, a purpose that allowed the Horti to escape the urban expansion of the 1950s and 1960s. In 2022, the administration of the Almo Collegio Borromeo decided to redevelop the area, transforming the Horti into a large public space, open for free. The park includes a vast naturalistic area, characterized by waterways, where various habitats have been created to enhance and safeguard biodiversity, within which more than 3,000 native trees and shrubs have been placed and an en plein air exhibition area. of contemporary art, where works by: Arnaldo Pomodoro, Nicola Carrino, Gianfranco Pardi, Luigi Mainolfi, Marco Lodola, Mauro Staccioli, Salvatore Cuschera, Ivan Tresoldi and David Tremlett are exhibited.

== Admission ==
College admission follows an open, meritocratic competition divided into a variety of assessments; only those who have obtained a minimum score of 80 in their graduation exam may apply for the admissions competition. This competition is now run in conjunction with the Scuola Superiore Studi Pavia IUSS, the School for Advanced Studies, of which the Almo Collegio Borromeo is a founding member and, indeed, the admission test is valid for access to IUSS courses to the extent of space reserved for the college. Nevertheless, gaining a place at Borromeo does not automatically secure a place in IUSS: although it is not the norm, there are students of Borromeo who are not students of IUSS, as the rankings of the IUSS competition and the Borromeo competition are separate and follow different criteria (distinguishing different classes and thresholds).

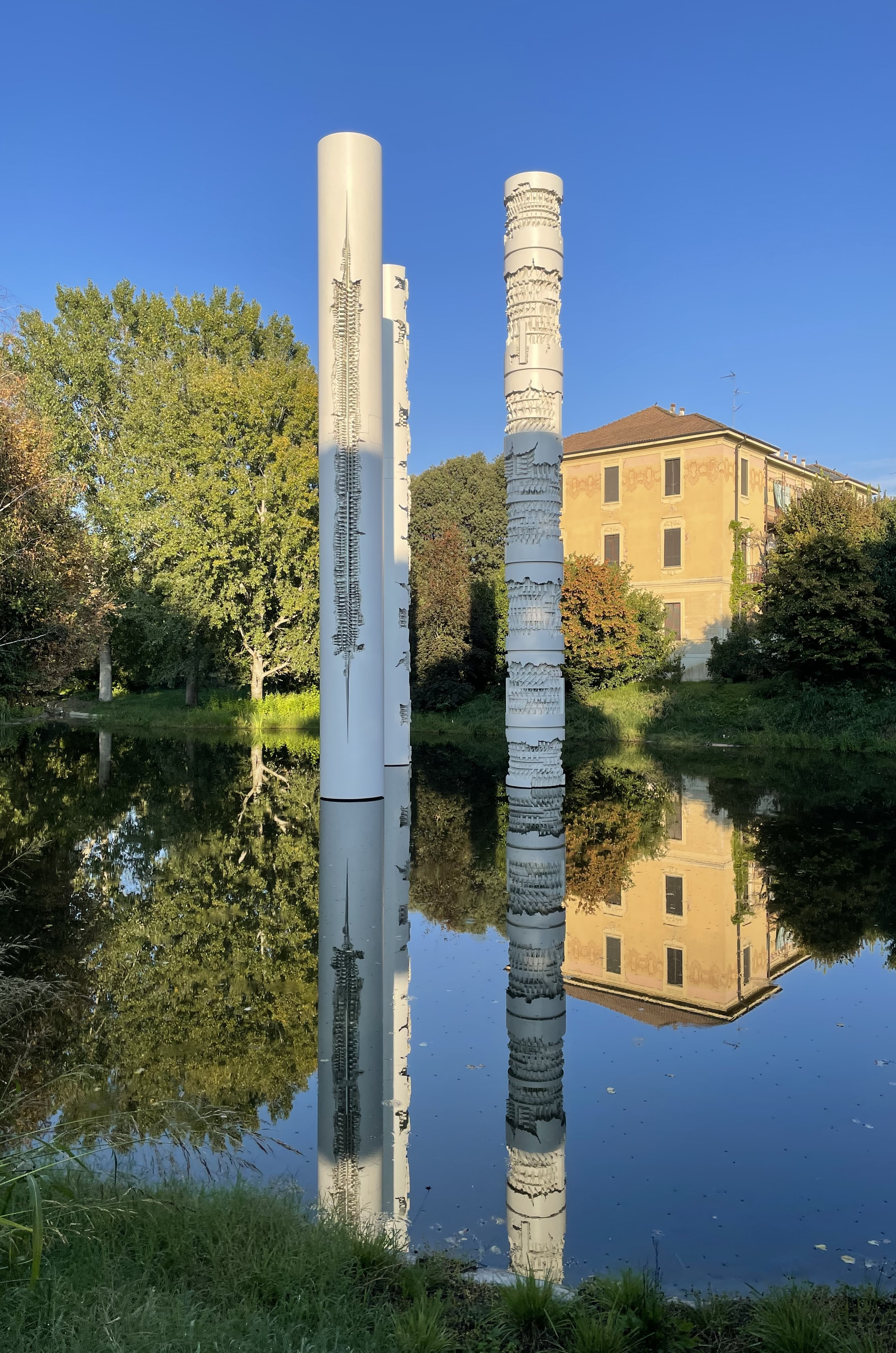
Arnaldo Pomodoro, Triade, 1979.

The first part of the competition includes a written test administered by the IUSS, divided into the following disciplines: Italian, Latin, History, Philosophy, Mathematics, Physics, Chemistry and Biology. Mathematics, Physics and Chemistry problems were recently introduced. One can choose the track and the exercises regardless of the degree course chosen and can obtain a maximum score of 20 points from this written test. Those obtaining a minimum score of 12 points in the written test are invited to two oral examinations. In these, candidates are tested on the content of their last three years of high school in two subjects of their choice, however relevant to their degree course. The test begins from a topic chosen by the student and listed in the schedule ("tesario"; containing the list of topics to prepare for each discipline). The oral exam can provide up to 60 points, 30 for each interview. Additionally, as part of these tests, the candidate is interviewed by the appropriate college Rector and, in order to gauge the strength of compatible cultural background, general knowledge, and undergoes a aptitude interview with a psychologist seeking to determine eligibility for collegiate life. The latter tests have no value for the IUSS competition but contribute 20 points overall towards Borromeo entry. To be eligible, a candidate must achieve the minimum score of 65 points.

== Retention ==
To retain their place at the college, students are required to have a university average of at least 27/30, with no marks below 24, and to pass all required exams by the formal closing of the academic year. The ability to speak at least two foreign languages is required, demonstrated through specific, internationally recognized certificates. Students must also attend additional courses required by IUSS or, alternatively, take at least two internal courses per academic year.

== Recognized internal courses ==
- Applied ethics
- Basic ethics
- Contemporary Poetry and Creative Writing
- Data mining
- Dynamic programming, optimal control and applications
- Environmental ethics
- Ethics and economics
- Game theory
- Music and...
- Neuroscience
- New topics in general surgery
- Pregnancy, diabetes and dialysis
- Renewable energies
- Systemic autoimmunity
- Topics in human physiology
- Topics in neurophysiology
- Transportation theory
- Updates in cellular physiology

== Literature and popular culture ==
Giorgio Vasari, Alessandro Manzoni and Cesare Angelini have given descriptions of the college and the building was used as a film set for Le cinque giornate by Dario Argento and for Liberi, armati e pericolosi by Romolo Guerrieri. It also appeared in the satirical program Laureato by Piero Chiambretti.

== Famous alumni ==
The college has a long list of distinguished alumni across all fields of knowledge. Amongst them are:

- Law and politics:
  - Antonio Stoppani (? – 1746);
  - Giuseppe Carpani (1752–1825);
  - Giuseppe Sacchi (1804–1891);
  - Giuseppe Ferrari (1811–1876);
  - Antonio Raimondi (1860–1950);
  - Mino Martinazzoli (1931–2011);
- Medicine:
  - Agostino Bertani (1812–1886);
  - Carlo Forlanini (1847–1918);
- Mathematics, physics, engineering and the natural sciences
  - Andrea Frova (1936);
- Literature and philosophy:
  - Emanuele Severino (1929).
- Religion:
  - Federico Borromeo (1564–1631);
  - Alessandro Maggiolini (1567–2008);
  - Giuseppe Alessandro Furietti (1685–1764);
  - Fabrizio Serbelloni (1695–1775);
  - Ignazio Busca (1731–1805);

In addition, the college hosted the Russian poet Vyacheslav Ivanov between 1926 and 1936, and its Rectors include Cesare Angelini, a leading interpreter of Alessandro Manzoni and Leopoldo Riboldi, Rector perpetuus who, with the donation of 4,200 volumes to the college library, contributed to the establishing of a Faculty of Political Sciences in Pavia, the first in Italy.

Currently, a substantial part of the academic staff at Pavia (around 250 professors, researchers and graduate students) come from the Almo Collegio Borromeo. The former Rector of the University of Pavia and Professor of Physics, Angiolino Stella is a former student of the college.

== See also ==
- St. Charles Borromeo
- University of Pavia
- Collegio Ghislieri
- IUSS Pavia
- Pavia
