= Cesare Angelini (author) =

Biography on Italian author

- Presbyter of Roman Catholic Church
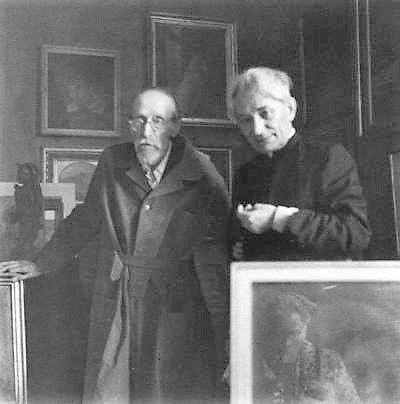
- Ugo Bernasconi (1874-1960), painter, with father Cesare Angelini in Cantù, 1957.
- Church: Roman Catholic Church
- In office: 1910 – 1976
- Previous posts: Presbyter, writer, literary critic

Orders
- Ordination: 24 June 1910

Personal details
- Born: 2 August 1886 Albuzzano, Italy
- Died: 27 September 1976 (aged 90) Pavia, Italy

Cesare Angelini (2 August 1886 – 27 September 1976) was an Italian presbyter, writer and literary critic.

== Biography ==
=== Albuzzano, education ===
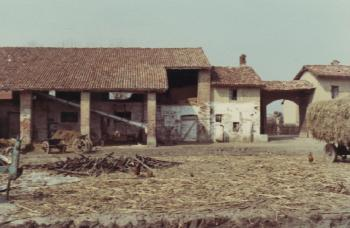
The birthplace in Albuzzano

Angelini was born in Albuzzano. He was the sixth son of Giovanni Battista and Maria Maddalena Bozzini (or Bosini), peasants from whom he learned the rural agricultural traditions.

Under the care of the archpriest of Albuzzano, Cesare Prelini (1843–1915), he prepared for his high school studies which he carried out at the Episcopal Seminary of Pavia. He was ordained a priest on 24 June 1910.

=== Cesena, first writings ===
From 1910 to 1915, he was called to teach literature at the Seminary of Cesena by the local bishop, Monsignor Giovanni Cazzani from Pavia. Angelini would meet with the literary critic Renato Serra most days in the town of Romagna. Serra was a librarian of the Malatestiana Library who brought Angelini closer to literature, introduced him to the cultural environment of the Voce and started Angelini on the path of fragmentism intrinsic to the Florentine magazine.

Angelini's debut in a literary sheet took place in Romagna, year X, 1913, no. 1, January 15, p. 4-20, with the essay Un poeta della critica dedicated to Serra. Other interventions from that period (critical essays, lyric prose and poems) appeared in magazines at the limit of local circulation such as La Romagna, Il Corriere Cesena, Il Cittadino. Serra died on 20 July 1915, at the age of thirty, in the First World War on Podgora. Angelini will keep his memory throughout his existence, publishing numerous essays dedicated to him in magazines, in commemorative editions.

=== La Voce, First World War ===
In 1915 Angelini was in Pavia and wrote the first two essays for the white Voce of De Robertis on Pascoli, Pascoli moderno (no. 9, April) and Pascoli e Croce (no. 13, July). Also in the Florentine magazine, in the commemorative number dedicated to Renato Serra (no. 16, October), appeared his contribution Il primo critico puro, in which there is already the intention of art and literature that he will exercise throughout his life, remaining faithful to Serra's teaching and to his ethical and cultural lesson.

From March 1916 he participated in the First World War as a soldier in the health service and, from August 1917, chaplain of the Alpini in the Sette Comuni battalion, then in the Bassano battalion, and, from January 1918, in the Intra battalion.

On a mission to Albania, in the summer of 1919, he approached Alì Mohamed Murtezza Karageorgevič, Mutfì of Antivari: the exchange and common reading of religious books - the Gospel, the Koran - resulted in an episode that seemed to anticipate Pope John XXIII's ecumenism.

=== Torre d'Isola, prose writer, militant critic ===
In October 1919, discharged, he moved to Torre d'Isola, coadjutor of his brother Giuseppe who was a pastor there, and taught literature in the Episcopal Seminary of Pavia.

He has been collaborating since 1920 with critical essays and lyrical prose in the milanese magazines Il Convegno by Enzo Ferrieri, Il Carroccio, La Festa, later in Pègaso and Pan by Ugo Ojetti.

In 1923 he published his first work Il lettore provveduto, a collection of literary studies on 19th and 20th century writers (first published in Convegno magazine) with a preface Discorso con l'anima mia. Three years later, in 1926, La Civiltà Cattolica (1926, no. 3, pp. 532–533) reported an anonymous criticism accusing Angelini of not giving «exact account of the moral and religious value of the authors»; with particular reference to the expressions of esteem present in the chapter concerning Giovanni Verga, an author who did not fall within the canons of Catholic readings.

=== Friends ===
Correspondence continued and expanded, with Antonio Baldini, Benedetto Croce, Giuseppe De Robertis, Giacomo Debenedetti, Enrico Falqui, Tommaso Gallarati Scotti, Carlo Linati, Marino Moretti.

He also began an acquaintance with the vernacular poet Angelo Ferrari (1874–1971), for whose second collection of poems Un bris ad ciel (1924) he collaborated in the choice of texts.

In January 1924, following his intervention in the magazine La Festa concerning Ada Negri, which he had read since his years in the Seminary, he received a letter of thanks from her from which a relationship of friendship and correspondence began.

Vittorio Beonio-Brocchieri frequented. He had friendships and correspondence with Giuseppe Prezzolini, whom he met in Rome in 1919 in the offices of the Voce.

He established a relationship with Giovanni Papini, to the point that Papini confided and anticipated his conversion to Christianity to Angelini. It was Papini himself who wrote an open letter in a magazine with esteem, which would bring Angelini credit in the literary world.

=== Pilgrim in the Holy Land, pastor ===
In December 1932, he made his first pilgrimage to the Holy Land by sea (the travel diary was subsequently presented in installments - January, February 1933 - in the pages of Corriere della Sera); returning there in March 1937.

In 1938, after his brother died, appointed pastor of Torre d'Isola.

=== The Borromeo ===
Since 1939 he was rector of Almo Collegio Borromeo, it is the oldest university college in Italy founded in Pavia by San Carlo in 1561. He remained there for 22 years.

From 1941 to 1945, the Borromeo was transformed into a military hospital: Angelini maintained contact with the students involved in the conflict, and in any case supervised the life of the college.

In 1946, in the difficult period of reconstruction, in order to (re) bring students and ex-students closer to the college, he established the Alumni Association.

From 1946 to 1955 he promoted the publication of the Saggi di umanismo cristiano, Quaderni dell'Almo Collegio Borromeo, signing himself as editorial secretary: a quarterly in which, together with the contributions of already known authors, wrote also young students and ex-students of the Borromeo itself, of the Collegio Ghislieri and of the Normale di Pisa - who would reach prominent places in the world of culture. Angelini of his own published essays, prose and poems.

He hostes personalities of different orientations for conferences, so that they could speak to students and to the citizens of Pavia, who were also always invited.

He wrote some prose dedicated to the college: Questo Borromeo, Piazza Borromeo and Luna sul Borromeo.

=== Assisi, domestic prelate ===
In August 1946 he took part in the religious courses of the Pro Civitate Christiana in Assisi, which he would follow year after year until 1960. Assisi was a favorite destination of the priest from Pavia, where he met fellow friends-coursesists Antonio Baldini, Piero Bargellini, Silvio D'Amico, Nazareno Fabbretti, Giovanni Papini, Daniel-Rops, Michele Saponaro, and others.

On 21 July 1950 he was appointed domestic prelate.

=== Luigi Porta street, Sant'Invenzio street ===
After the rectorate in Borromeo, from 1961 to 1976 he led a private life in Pavia, first in Luigi Porta street then in Sant'Invenzio street to which he reserved autobiographical pages.

He reproposed his texts in new editions: in a continuous and repeated work he corrected a previous mannerism and an excessive literariness. It can be said that Angelini completely revised his work, he "rewrote" himself.

He published a school commentary on The Betrothed for Principato (1962).

Edit the Bible for Fabbri in handouts (1962). He translates sacred scriptures: the Song of Songs for Scheiwiller (1963), the Acts of the Apostles for Einaudi (1967) and the Apocalypse for Franco Maria Ricci (1969).

He was an elzevirist of Corriere della Sera, essayist in Nuova Antologia.

On 14 October 1964 he received an honorary degree in Letters from the University of Pavia.

On 11 May 1968, at the castle of Bolsena, he was awarded the «Emilio Cecchi Prize» reserved for critics for the volume Capitoli sul Manzoni, vecchi e nuovi, an anthology of his writings about Manzoni published in 1966 by Mondadori.

On 28 May 1972 he was awarded the first edition of the "Targa d'Oro Jean Giono" from the Rotary Club of Voghera.

In April 1975, at the age of 88, with the rector of the Almo Collegio Borromeo, Angelo Comini, and some students, he went to Rome for the twenty-fifth Jubilee; on 2 April he was publicly welcomed by Pope Paul VI in the courtyard of S. Damaso.

On the evening of 27 September 1976, at the age of 90, he died in his home in Sant'Invenzio street.

Although on several occasions he had openly expressed the desire for his tomb located in the Holy Land, he is buried in the cemetery of Torre d'Isola, next to his parents and brothers, as he requests in his will dated 10 September 1975.

== Works ==
His production, which includes numerous books, can be divided into some sections.

=== Prose ===
He was the author of art prose, also of an autobiographical nature, published in magazines and then collected and reworked in volumes, among which we highlight: Commenti alle cose (1925), I doni del Signore (1933), Santi e poeti (e paesi) (1939), Carta, penna e calamaio (1944), Acquerelli (1948), I frammenti del Sabato (1952), Autunno (e altre stagioni) (1959), Viaggio in Pavia (1964), Questa mia Bassa (e altre terre) (1970), Il piacere della memoria (1977).

=== Poetry ===
He debuted with verses in the Pascoli style published in newspapers from Pavia and Cesena (1912–1913), collected in Belvento di Romagna. Pagine disperse (1912-1923), edited by Renzo Cremante, (2010).

A new poetic experience can be found from 1947 to 1948: he published twelve sonnets dedicated to the months - in installments - in the quarterly Saggi di umanismo cristiano, then revised and reunited in Autunno (e altre stagioni) (1959), finally resubmitted with variations in Il piacere della memoria (1977).

=== Critic ===
In critic he was outlined in the absolute fidelity to Manzoni - who became an example and almost an interlocutor - expressed in numerous volumes, since 1924 with Il dono del Manzoni, followed by Invito al Manzoni (1936), Manzoni (1942), L'osteria della luna piena (1962). The anthology was Capitoli sul Manzoni vecchi e nuovi (1966) and publish commentary on The Betrothed in 1958. Finally Variazioni manzoniane (1974) and the posthumous Con Renzo e con Lucia (e con gli altri). Essays on Manzoni (1986).

He paused on Dante with Il commento dell'esule (Noterelle dantesche) (1967).

About Leopardi, Foscolo, Monti, he wrote studies and editions, later brought together in Nostro Ottocento (1970) and Altro Ottocento (e un po' di Novecento) (1973); published essays about Pascoli, admired since his youth in Cesena, collected in Su Pascoli (e dintorni di Romagna). Pagine disperse, edited by Renzo Cremante, (2008).

In the context of the twentieth century he dealt in particular with Renato Serra, and reported some of the essays dedicated to him in Notizia di Renato Serra (1968); moreover, he reserved studies for authors who feel similar to his choices as a reader, many of which were finally merged into Cronachette di letteratura contemporanea (1971).

=== Religious literature ===
He was accompanied by a long dedication to religious literature; among the volumes we note: Conversazioni sul Vangelo (1930), La vita di Gesù narrata ai ragazzi (1934), Il leggendario dei Santi (1935), Invito in Terrasanta (1937), Il Regno dei Cieli (1950), Parabole e fatti nel Vangelo (1955), Quattro Santi (e un libro) (1957), La madre del Signore (1958), Ritratto di Vescovo (Mons. Giovanni Cazzani) (1969), Caterina da Siena voce d'Italia (1974), La vita di Gesù narrata da sua madre (1976), Ritratti di sacerdoti (1977), Lettera al Papa (con altri scritti) (1977).

He edited the Viaggi in Terrasanta by Leonardo Frescobaldi and Simone Sigoli (1944), the Gospels in the translation of Niccolò Tommaseo (1949), the Bible (1962); translated the Song of Songs (1963), the Acts of the Apostles (1967) and the Apocalypse (1969).

=== School editions ===
In school editions he published literary anthologies edited by him, for seminars, middle schools, gymnasium classes, scientific high school: La vite e i tralci (1931), La porta d'oro (1946), L'allegra vendemmia (1949). For middle schools he was the author of religious texts: La grande promessa (1952), Il Messia è con noi (1952), Vivere il credo (1952).

Furthermore, from 1930 to 1957, he was called to collaborate with the most popular primary school textbooks, taking care of the religious part and the choice of readings.

A commentary on The Betrothed for school was published in 1962.

=== Posthumous anthologies ===
An exhaustive anthology of works is offered in the three volumes:

- Cesare Angelini nel 'tempo' delle amicizie, edited by Angelo Stella, Pavia, Centro di ricerca sulla tradizione manoscritta di autori moderni e contemporanei (1996). ISBN 88-86719-06-X
- Il mondo di Cesare Angelini, edited by Gianni Mussini and Vanni Scheiwiller, illustrations by Luisa Bianchi, introductory essay by Angelo Stella, Milano, Libri Scheiwiller-Banca Popolare di Milano (1997).
- Mario Cantella, La poetica degli occhi. Vita e scritti di Cesare Angelini, illustrations by Luisa Bianchi, Pavia, Il Regisole (2000).

== Archive ==
The Correspondence (consisting of about two thousand units with about two hundred and thirty correspondents) was transferred in 1992 by the Angelini family to the Centro di ricerca sulla tradizione manoscritta di autori moderni e contemporanei (University of Pavia).

The Library (consisting of about nineteen hundred volumes plus uncatalogued journals) was donated in July 1995 by the Angelini family to the Library of the Episcopal Seminary of Pavia, as per Angelini's testamentary request.

== Letters ==
An exhaustive publication of the correspondence is proposed in the volumes:

- Cesare Angelini, Giuseppe Prezzolini, Carteggio: 1919-1976, edited by Margherita Marchione and Gianni Mussini, preface by Giuseppe Prezzolini, Roma, Edizioni di storia e letteratura, 1983.
- Cesare Angelini, I doni della vita. Lettere 1913-1976, edited by Angelo Stella and Anna Modena, Milano, Rusconi, 1985. ISBN 88-18-12022-0
- Roberta Ramella, Lettere di Cesare Angelini a Luigi Fallacara, in Autografo, year XIII no. 27, Milano, Giorgio Mondadori, ottobre 1992, pp. 81–95.
- Cesare Repossi, Cesare Angelini e Ada Negri. Incontri nella "rossa Pavia", presentation by Angelo Stella, Pavia, UNITRE, 1996. ISBN 88-7963-054-7
- Cesare Angelini nel 'tempo' delle amicizie, edited by Angelo Stella, Pavia, Centro di ricerca sulla tradizione manoscritta di autori moderni e contemporanei, 1996. ISBN 88-86719-06-X
- Gianandrea Zanone, Corrispondenza Fracchia-Angelini, in Archivi del nuovo, no. 2, edited by Renzo Cremante, Cesenatico, Casa Moretti, 1998, pp. 117–131.
- Arturo Colombo, Curiosando fra gli epistolari con Missiroli e Spadolini. Quelle carte parlanti di Angelini "giornalista", in Nuova Antologia, no. 2240, Firenze, 2006, pp. 70–77.
- Manuela Ricci, Il carteggio fra Antonio Baldini e Cesare Angelini (con una parentesi morettiana), in Filologia e critica nella modernità letteraria. Studi in onore di Renzo Cremante, edited by Andrea Battistini, Arnaldo Bruni, Irene Romera Pintor, Bologna, CLUEB, 2012, pp. 369–408. ISBN 978-88-491-3687-6
- Cesare Angelini, Carlo Linati, Carteggio: 1919-1976, edited by Fabio Maggi and Nicoletta Trotta, preface by Renzo Cremante, Roma, Edizioni di storia e letteratura, 2013. ISBN 978-88-6372-530-8
- Fabio Maggi, Giuseppe Ungaretti in Borromeo (correspondence with Ungaretti), in Quaderni borromaici, no. 4, Novara, Interlinea, 2017, pp. 109–121.
- Cesare Angelini, Paolo De Benedetti, Quasi evangelista, quasi talmudista. Lettere (1949-1975), edited by Nicoletta Leone and Fabio Maggi, Brescia, Morcelliana, 2020. ISBN 978-88-372-3353-2
- Cesare Angelini, Gianfranco Contini, Critica e carità. Lettere (1934-1965), edited by Gianni Mussini, with the collaboration of Fabio Maggi, presentation by Carlo Carena, Novara, Interlinea, 2021. ISBN 978-88-6857-384-3
- Cesare Angelini, Enrico Falqui, "Queste nostre benedette Lettere". Carteggio (1928-1974), edited by Giacomo Bruni, presentation by Giuseppe Antonelli, Novara, Interlinea ("Biblioteca di 'Autografo'"), 2025. ISBN 978-88-6857-628-8

== Bibliography ==
- Carlo Bo, Cesare Angelini, Pavia, Almo Collegio Borromeo, 1977.
- Alberto Cavaglion, «Un Oltrepò transmarino», in Verso la Terra Promessa. Scrittori italiani a Gerusalemme da Matilde Serao a Pier Paolo Pasolini, Roma, Carocci, 2016, pp. 45–47. ISBN 978-88-430-7925-4
- Piero Chiara, Passando per Pavia, in La Fiera letteraria, February 24, p. 3.
- Gianfranco Contini, without title, in Quaderni della Nuova Antologia (Per Cesare Angelini. Studi e testimonianze), XXXV, edited by Angelo Stella, Firenze, Le Monnier, 1988, pp. 117–119. ISBN 88-00-85553-9
- Maria Corti, Il Manzoni di Cesare Angelini, in Cesare Angelini nel 'tempo' delle amicizie, edited by Angelo Stella, Pavia, Centro di ricerca sulla tradizione manoscritta di autori moderni e contemporanei, pp. 13–21. ISBN 88-86719-06-X
- Renzo Cremante, Angelini e la Romagna, in Quaderni della Nuova Antologia (Per Cesare Angelini. Studi e testimonianze), cited work, pp. 45–60.
- Stefano Fugazza, «Pareva uno scricciolo», in Quaderni del Ticino, year II no. 12, Magenta, January 1983, pp. 51–59.
- Carlo Linati, Incontro con Angelini, in Settegiorni, June 26, 1943, p. 9.
- Giovanni Macchia, Un castello di fiaba per Cesare Angelini, in Scrittori al tramonto, Milano, Adelphi, 1999. ISBN 88-459-1451-8
- Francesco Messina, Ricordo di Cesare Angelini, in Care, grandi ombre. Ritratti di artisti e scrittori del 900, edited by Vanni Scheiwiller, Milano, All'Insegna del Pesce d'Oro, 1985, pp. 7–8.
- Indro Montanelli, Cesare Angelini, in Corriere della Sera, December 30, 1964, p. 3.
- Ada Negri, Chiesetta di campagna, in Corriere della Sera, August 10, 1931, p. 3.
- Giovanni Papini, Santa letteratura, in La Festa, year I no. 1, January 5, 1924, p. 8.
- Luciano Parisi, Cesare Angelini, interprete manzoniano, in The Italianist, n. 21–22, edited by Alessia Bruno, 2001–2002, pp. 5–26.
- Guido Piovene, Viaggio in Italia, Milano, Mondadori, 1957, pp. 99–101.
- Giuseppe Prezzolini, È morto a Pavia Cesare Angelini, in il Resto del Carlino, September 30, 1976, p. 11.
- Cesare Repossi, Cesare Angelini, lo stile come storia, in Cesare Angelini nel 'tempo' delle amicizie, cited work, pp. 35–62.
- Stefania Santalucia, Ascoltare i silenzi, scoprire gli incanti, edited by Anna Bruni, illustrations by Luisa Bianchi, Torre d'Isola, Comune di Torre d'Isola, 2001.
- Luigi Santucci, Mercante di stelle eterno adolescente, in Il Giorno, March 13, 1986, p. 3.
- Giovanni Spadolini, Prolusione, in Quaderni della Nuova Antologia (Per Cesare Angelini. Studi e testimonianze), cited work, pp. 15–21.
- Angelo Stella, La tentazione delle lettere, in Cesare Angelini nel 'tempo' delle amicizie, cited work, pp. 29–33.
- Susanna Zatti, Angelini e gli artisti nel ‘segno' della poesia, in Cesare Angelini nel 'tempo' delle amicizie, cited work, pp. 265–292.
