= Palazzo Bolognetti, Bologna =

Renaissance style palace in Italy

Coordinates: 44.49347°N 11.34608°E

The Palazzo Bolognetti is a Renaissance style palace located on Via Castiglione #1, in central Bologna, region of Emilia Romagna, Italy. The palace is adjacent to the Palazzo della Mercanzia.

The portico in front of the palace dates to the 15th century, while the building was erected in 1551 in a style recalling Pellegrino Tibaldi. The decorations in the atrium and entrance stairwell are attributed to Andrea Marchesi. The palace suffered much damage in the war and was restored. It houses the Circolo Bononia , ancient Gentlemen's Club, now with a Lady for President, first in the world. (Cfr. Il Resto del Carlino 12 settembre 2020)
