= Mario Vegetti =

Italian historian of philosophy

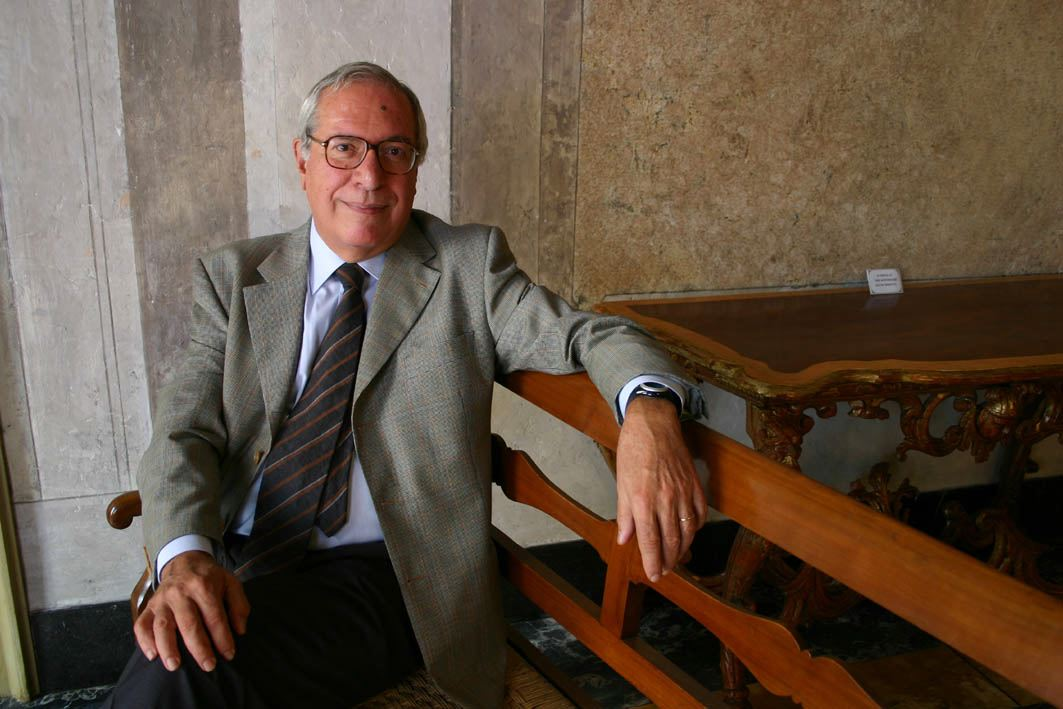
- Mario Vegetti in 2011
- Born: 4 January 1937; Milan, Italy
- Died: 11 March 2018 (aged 81); Milan, Italy

Philosophical work
- Era: Contemporary philosophy
- Region: Western Philosophy
- School: Continental philosophy
- Main interests: Ethics; history of philosophy

Mario Vegetti (4 January 1937 – 11 March 2018) was an Italian historian of philosophy.

== Education ==
Mario Vegetti was born in Milan in 1937. He graduated with a thesis on Thucydides' historiography at the University of Pavia, as a student at Collegio Ghislieri.

He was full professor of the history of ancient philosophy at the University of Pavia and directed the Department of Philosophy of the same university. He was professor at Scuola Superiore Studi Pavia IUSS.

He was a member of the International Collegium Politicum, of the Accademia napoletana di scienze morali, and of the Istituto Lombardo-Accademia di Scienze e Lettere.

== Research interests ==
He translated and wrote a commentary of many of Hippocrates', Aristoteles', and Galen's writings. Among Vegetti's are Il coltello e lo stilo (1996), Tra Edipo e Euclide (1983), L'etica degli antichi (1996), Guida alla lettura della 'Repubblica' di Platone (1999), Quindici lezioni su Platone (2003).

Vegetti's research work covered several fields of history of ancient thought such as: ethics, politics, anthropology, history of medicine and science, and philosophical historiography. Some of his papers are devoted to topics concerning the forms of subjectivity, anthropological theories, and the formation of the concept of cause, other studies deal with Plato, Aristotle, Stoicism, Hellenistic Medicine, and Galen.
