= Vegetti =

Vegetti is a surname. Notable people with the surname include:

- Mario Vegetti (1937–2018), Italian historian
- Pablo Vegetti (born 1988), Argentine footballer
