= Scuola Superiore Studi Pavia IUSS =

Coordinates: 45.1847°N 9.1546°E

Institute for Advanced Study IUSS Pavia
- Motto: Sapere aude
- Motto in English: Dare to know
- Type: State-supported
- Established: 1997
- Affiliations: Conferenza Collegi Universitari Legalmente Riconosciuti
- President: Prof. Michele Di Francesco
- Academic staff: ca. 22 (plus 300 hosted every year)
- Administrative staff: ca. 42
- Students: ca. 350 (2007)
- Undergraduates: ca. 77 every year
- Location: Pavia, Italy
- Website: www.iusspavia.it

The Scuola Superiore IUSS or the "Istituto Universitario di Studi Superiori" of Pavia (Eng. IUSS - School for Advanced Studies) is a higher learning institute located in Pavia, Italy.

The Scuola Superiore IUSS was founded in 1997. It was created by the University of Pavia - one of the most ancient universities in the world - the Borromeo College and the Ghislieri College, and it is supported by the Italian Minister of Education. The IUSS reunites all the university colleges of Pavia, forming the Pavia Study System, including the Collegio Borromeo and the Collegio Ghislieri, founded in the 16th century. There are only three other comparable institutions in Italy: the Scuola Normale Superiore di Pisa, the Sant'Anna School of Advanced Studies and IMT School for Advanced Studies Lucca. It is a both a learning and research center, offering its students supplementary courses to enhance the regular university curriculum.

The IUSS has been federated with the Sant'Anna School of Advanced Studies in Pisa and with the Scuola Normale Superiore di Pisa since 2018.

== Areas of research ==
Four different areas of research are developed at the Scuola Superiore IUSS Pavia. These provide a strong international network of scientists:

- humanities
- social sciences
- biomedical sciences
- science and technology

== Courses ==
Three types of courses are offered:

- Undergraduate courses open, on a merit base, to the most promising students of Pavia University.
- II Level University Master degrees providing a strong international approach.
- PhD Degrees providing an interdisciplinary point of view and exposure to cutting edge research.

== Links ==
- Official website
