= Pellegrino Tibaldi =

Italian architect and painter

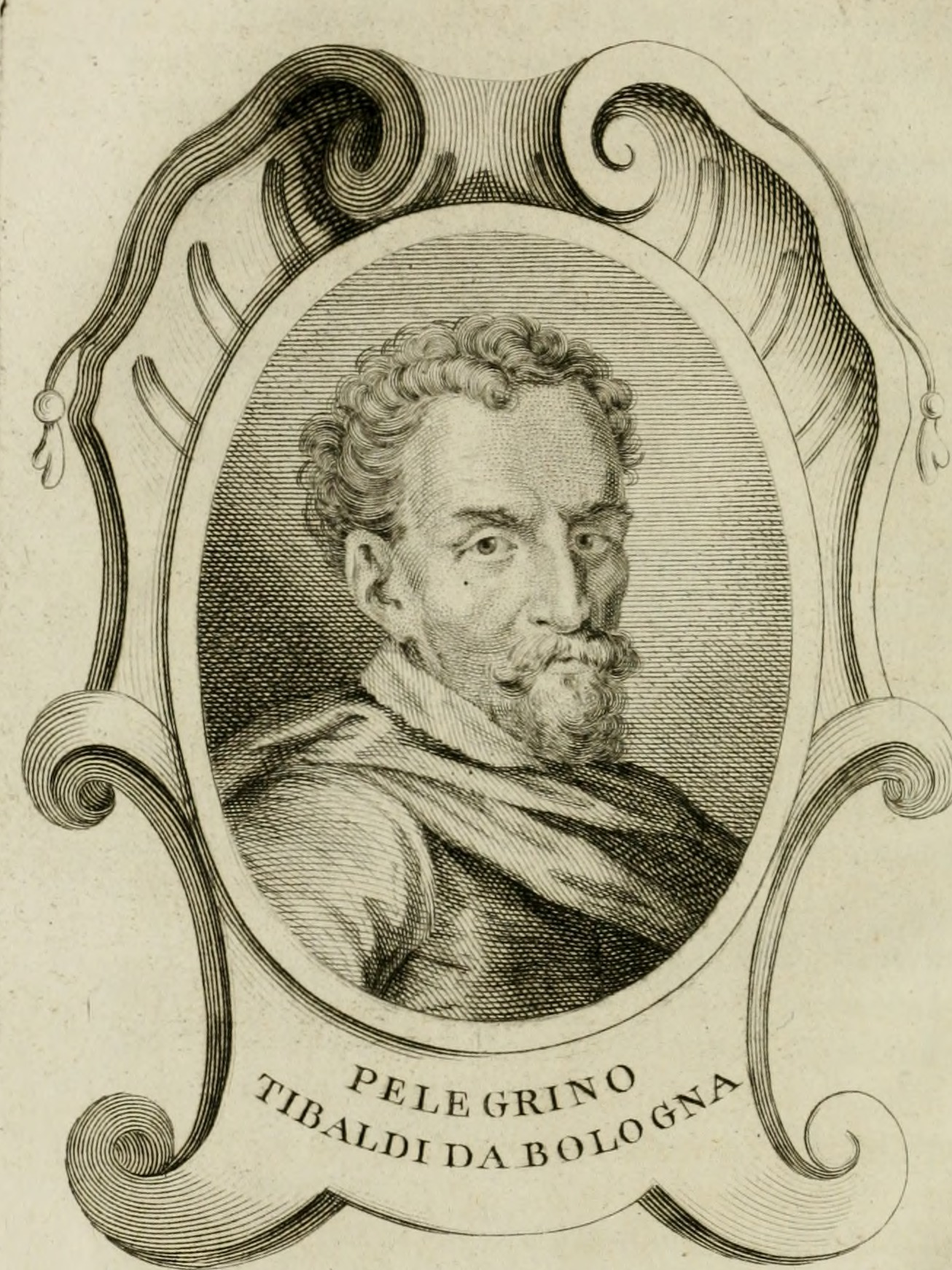
- Posthumous engraving of Tibaldi, 1762
- Born: 1527; Puria di Valsolda, Como, Italy
- Died: 1596 (aged 68–69); Milan, Italy
- Known for: Painting
- Movement: Mannerism

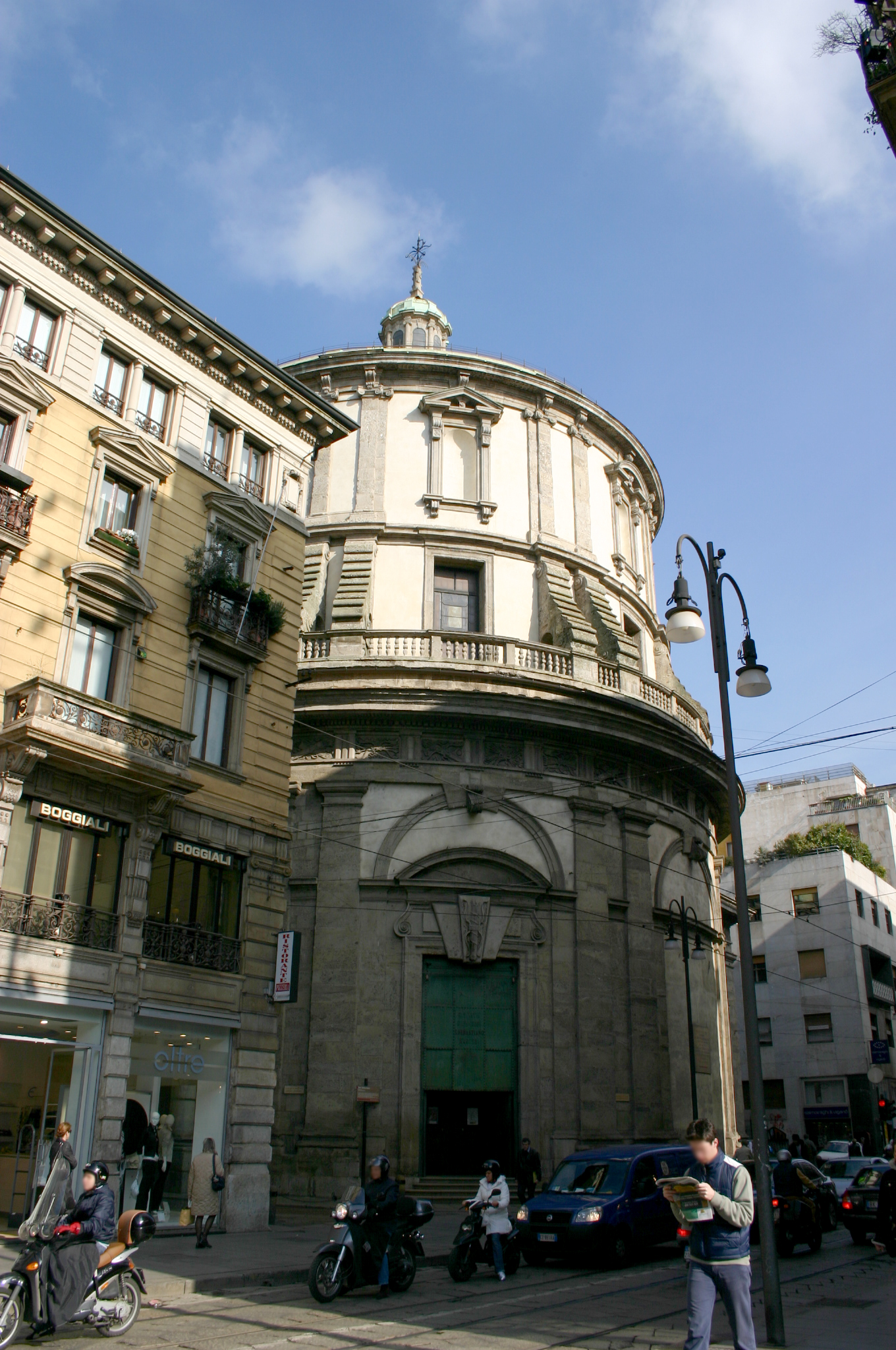
San Sebastiano (Milan)

Pellegrino Tibaldi (1527 – 27 May 1596), also known as Pellegrino di Tibaldo de Pellegrini, was an Italian mannerist architect, sculptor, and mural painter.

== Biography ==
Tibaldi was born in Puria di Valsolda, then part of the duchy of Milan, but grew up in Bologna. His father worked as stonemason. He may have apprenticed with Bagnacavallo or Innocenzo da Imola. His first documented painting was likely as at 15 years of age, a Marriage of Saint Catherine.

In 1547, he went to Rome to study under Perin del Vaga. He was employed in the decoration of the Sala del Consiglio of Castel Sant'Angelo. When Perino died in 1547, Tibaldi became the leader in the large-scale fresco painting of the chambers and doorways (1547–1549). The frescoes are described as Michelangelesque in influence.

From 1550 to 1553 Tibaldi collaborated with Marco Pino on the frescoes of the vault of Daniele da Volterra's della Rovere Chapel in Trinità dei Monti and frescoed a colourful Battle Scene on the vault of the chapel of St. Denis in San Luigi dei Francesi. Probably in 1551–52 he painted a fresco decoration in the Cortile del Belvedere for Pope Julius III. Late in 1553 he completed the frescoed figures of Saints Peter and Andrew in Sant'Andrea in Via Flaminia, for the same patron.

In 1554 Tibaldi was in Loreto at the command of Cardinal Otto Truchsess von Waldburg, decorating the chapel of St John the Baptist (now the chapel of the Assumption) in the Basilica della Santa Casa with frescoes and stuccos on the vault, an altarpiece of the Baptism with a portrait of the donor and lateral frescoes of St. John the Baptist Preaching and the Beheading of St. John the Baptist.

Probably early in 1555 he was summoned back to Bologna by Cardinal Giovanni Poggi, and he carried out numerous commissions for him. Tibaldi painted frescoes of the Story of Ulysses in the Palazzo Poggi, scenes from the life of the Baptist in the Poggi chapel, and scenes from the Life of Moses in the Palazzo Sacchetti in Rome. He constructed a chapel for his patron, in the church of S. Giacomo Maggiore, and painted for it a St. John preaching in the Wilderness, and the Division of the Elect from the Damned.

Tibaldi lived in Ancona between 1558 and 1561. Here he painted frescoes for Loggia dei Mercanti and Palazzo Ferretti. In 1561, he met Cardinal Carlo Borromeo, who employed him in Milan mostly as architect in the nearly endless task of constructing the cathedral, working on various projects in the cathedral, the courtyard of the archiepiscopal palace (1564–70), San Fedele (1569–1579) and San Sebastiano (1577). In Milan he worked also as a civil architect, projecting the Spinola, Erba Odescalchi and Prospero Visconti palaces. In 1575 he was commissioned by Cardinal Tolomeo Gallio the construction of Villa d'Este on the shores of Lake Como. In Pavia, again for Cardinal Charles Borromeo, Tibaldi designed the monumental building of the Almo Collegio Borromeo: a university boarding school set on an airy courtyard with a perfect quadrature, characterized by the elegant Serlian architectural design of the two orders of loggias. Also in Pavia, commissioned by Pope Pius V, Tibaldi was entrusted with the construction of the Collegio Ghislieri in 1567. Following the severe and ascetic character of the Counter-Reformation Pope, who had wanted a functional but not sumptuous construction for his college, Tibaldi interpreted this approach of the client by creating a three-storey building, with a square plan, imposing but not empty scenographic, with internal spaces functional to the community life that takes place there. He also designed the granite bell chamber added in 1585 to Pavia's Civic Tower, an 11th-century structure beside the cathedral complex; the tower collapsed in 1989.

In 1586 he went to Spain, where he followed and replaced Federico Zuccari as main court painter. He painted in the lower cloisters of El Escorial at the request of King Philip II. His greatest work were frescoes in the library. After nine years, he returned to Italy and was appointed architect of the Duomo of Milan until his death in Milan in 1592.

Pellegrino's brother, Domenico Tibaldi was a painter and architect active in Bologna. Among his pupils were Orazio Samacchini, Lorenzo Sabbatini, and Girolamo Miruoli.

== Partial anthology of works ==
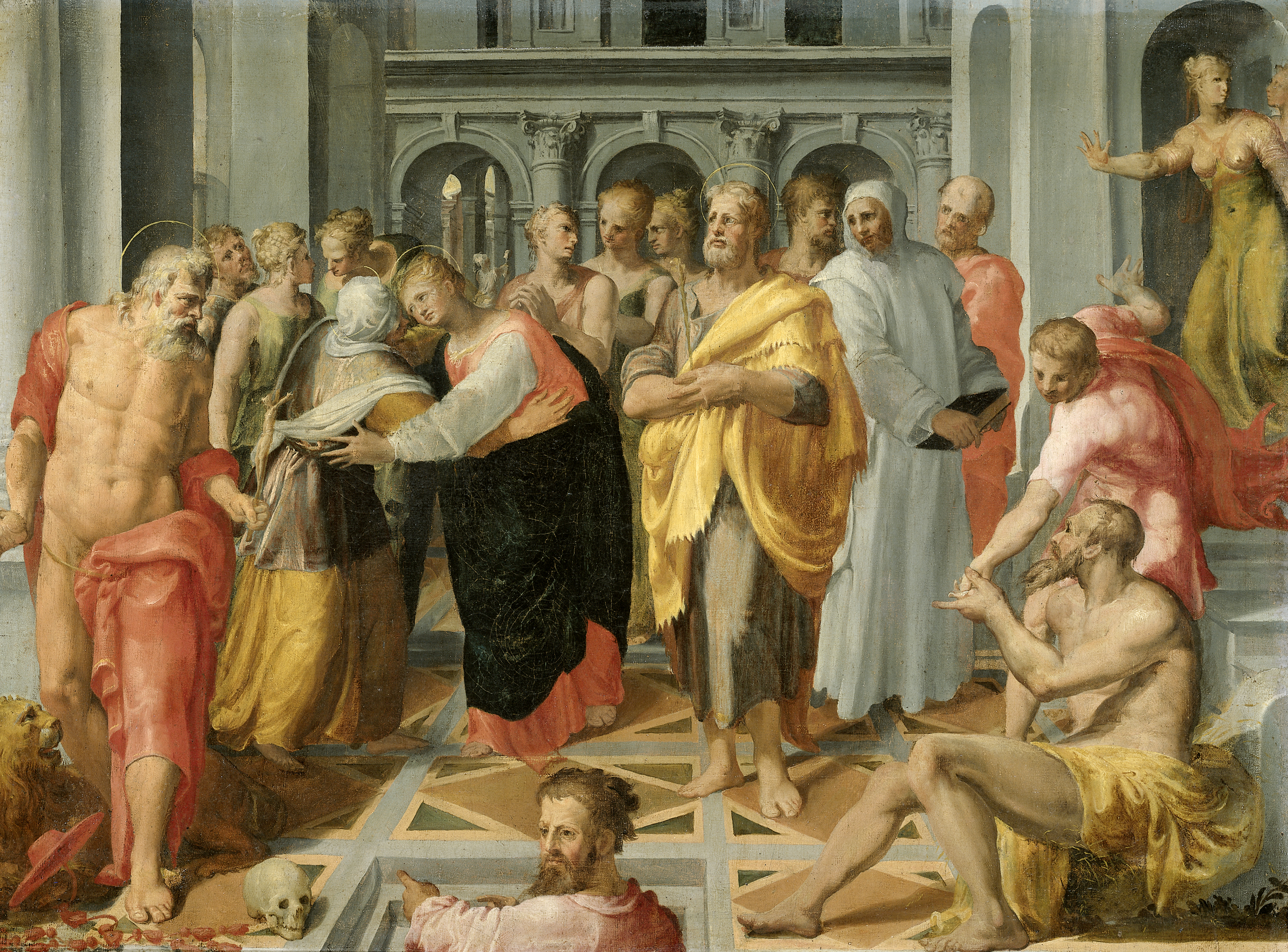
Meeting of Mary and Elizabeth in the Presence of Saints Joseph and Jerome, Rijksmuseum, Amsterdam

- Marriage of Saint Catherine – Pinacoteca, Bologna
- St Michael fresco – Castel Sant'Angelo, Rome
- The Adoration of Christ by Shepherds – Galleria Borghese, Rome
- Conception of John the Baptist (1555) – San Giorgio Maggiore, Bologna
- Preaching to the Multitude, (San Giorgio Maggiore, Bologna)
- Holy Family and Saint John the Baptist (attributed) – Indianapolis Museum of Art
- Baptism of Christ – Ancona
- Altarpiece – Sant'Agostino, Ancona
- Incredulity of Thomas (1565) – drawing, 1565, Ambrosiana, Milan
- The Incredulity of Thomas (recto); Study for the Figure of Thomas (verso) – drawing, Getty Museum
- The Beheading of St. John the Baptist – Pinacoteca di Brera, Milan
- Madonna and Child – Private collection
- Holy Family and Holy Elizabeth
- Allegory of Silence (1569) – Museo Civico, Bologna
- Blinding of Polyphemus – Palazzo Sanguinetti
- Life of the Virgin – Escorial, Madrid
- Passion of Christ – Escorial, Madrid
- Ecce Homo (1589) – El Escorial, Madrid
- St. Michael – El Escorial, Madrid
- Martyrdom of St. Lawrence – Escorial, Madrid
- "Story of Joseph" Montreal Museum of Fine Arts, Montreal, Canada
