= Ghislieri College =

College in Pavia, Lombardy, Italy

Coordinates: 45.1862°N 9.1617°E

Collegio Ghislieri
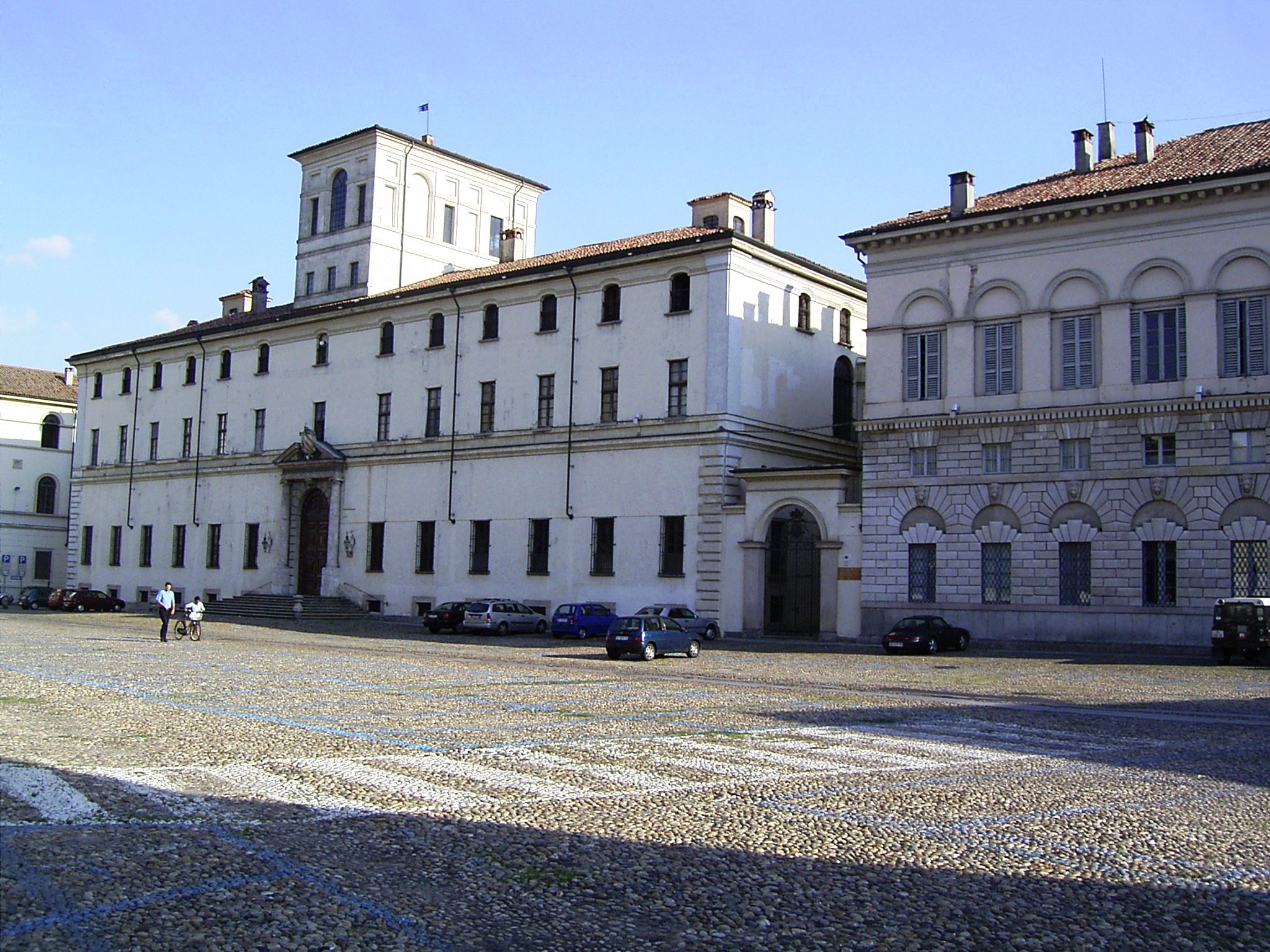
- Ghislieri College in Pavia
- Motto: Sapientia, cum probitate morum conjuncta, humanae mentis perfectio.
- Motto in English: Knowledge and morals are the perfection of the human mind.
- Type: State-sponsored
- Established: 1567
- President: Gian Arturo Ferrari
- Rector: Prof. Alessandro Maranesi
- Location: Pavia, Italy
- Website: www.ghislieri.it

The Ghislieri College (Italian: Collegio Ghislieri), founded in 1567 by Pope Pius V, is the second-oldest college in Pavia and co-founder of the IUSS in Pavia as well.

== History ==
Collegio Ghislieri is a 450-year-old Italian institution committed to promote university studies on the basis of merit, hosting around 200 pupils (males and females) who attend all faculties in the University of Pavia, offering them logistic and cultural opportunities such as scholarships, lectures, conferences, a 130,000-volume library (the third-largest private library in Northern Italy), and foreign-language courses. Each year about 40 new students from all over the country are selected by public competition. Founded by Pope Pius V (Antonio Ghislieri) in 1567, and secularly managed since the 18th century, the college is now under the High Patronage of the Presidency of the Italian Republic. It is classified among high qualifying institutions by the Italian Ministry for Education and University. Student expenses are subsidized by the college as the required fees are proportional to parental income; many places are granted for free. Among its alumni are Carlo Goldoni, Michele Rajna, and several Italian statesmen, scientists, and scholars of the last two centuries.

== The palace ==
The construction of the building intended to house the Ghislieri college was undertaken in 1571 under the direction of Pellegrino Tibaldi, one of the greatest architects of the time, who followed the works until 1585, the year in which he was called to Spain by Philip II. The austere spirit of the Counter-Reformation pervades the whole building, starting with the severe façade which has the sumptuous Roman school portal and the lantern tower as the only ornaments. Interpreting the spirit of Pope Pius V, the architect designed an imposing building yet functional to the community life for which it was intended. From this purpose derives the centrality of the four-sided portico, with columns combined and reinforced at the corners by a pillar, and of the large corridor on the main floor, overlooked by the students' rooms and which receives light from two large loggias. Towards the middle of the eighteenth century the building was significantly enlarged with the addition of a new wing to the south, the so-called Crimea.

== The chapel ==
The college chapel was designed by Pellegrino Tibaldi and only finished at the beginning of the seventeenth century, following the intervention of another famous architect of the time, Alessandro Mollo. The atrium, through which you enter the chapel, is dedicated to St. Pius V and preserves numerous paintings of the sixteenth century and in particular: The miracles of St. Pius V by Luigi Pellegrini Scaramuccia, San Pio frees the possessed by Giovanni Peruzzini and vision of the battle of Lepanto by Giovanni Battista del Sole. The oratory, with a central plan, is surmounted by a dome with eight segments with a lantern; on the altar, the altarpiece of the Nativity, Saint Jerome and Pius V (about 1620), by Guglielmo Caccia, stands out. The chapel is accessed through an atrium dedicated to St. Pius, whose miracles are celebrated in seventeenth-century paintings. The glory of the founder is celebrated, in the College, by numerous portraits (among which the painting by Scipione Pulzone, kept in the premises of the College's Administration and the Rector's apartment) and by sculptural works is noteworthy. Among the latter is the bronze statue signed by Francesco Nuvoloni and dated to 1692 which stands out in the center of Piazza Ghislieri: the work, cast in Rome by Francesco Ferreri, can be counted among the masterpieces of sculpture of the period and resumes tone and energy the grandeur of Bernini, whose manner Nuvoloni, a native of the Canton of Ticino, had made his own.

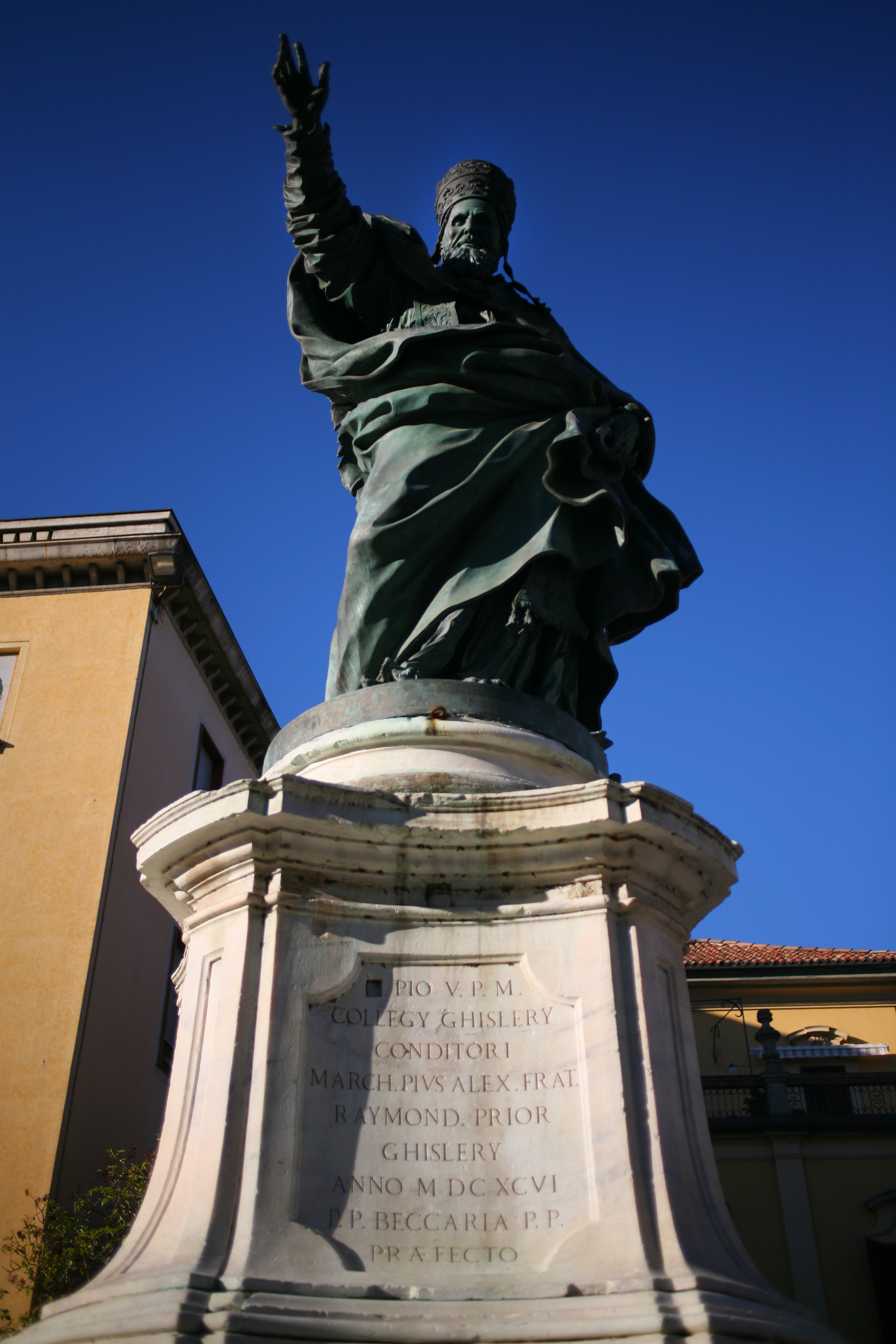
Francesco Nuvolone, monument to Pius V, located in front of the College and inaugurated in 1692.

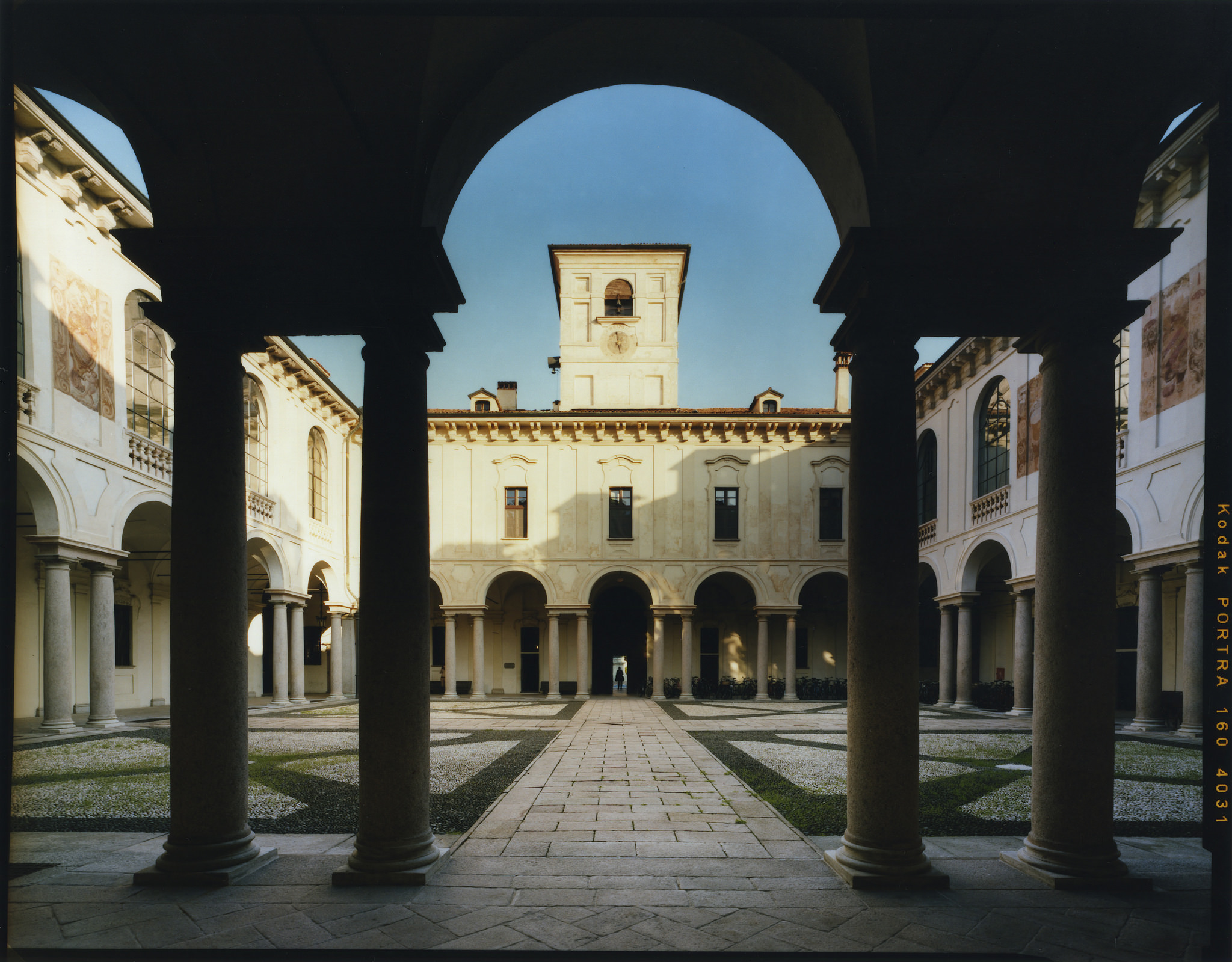
The courtyard.

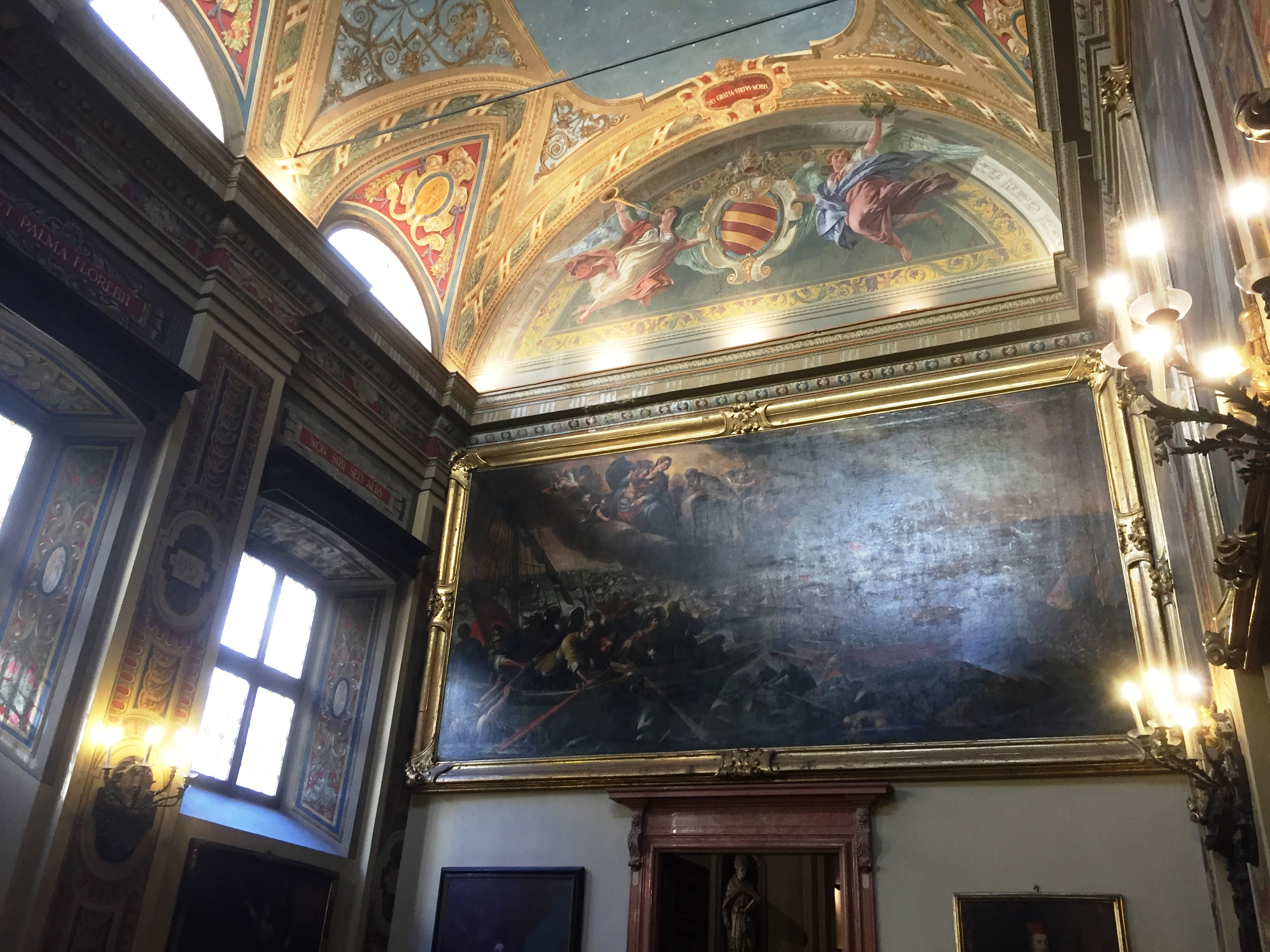
Atrium of the chapel.

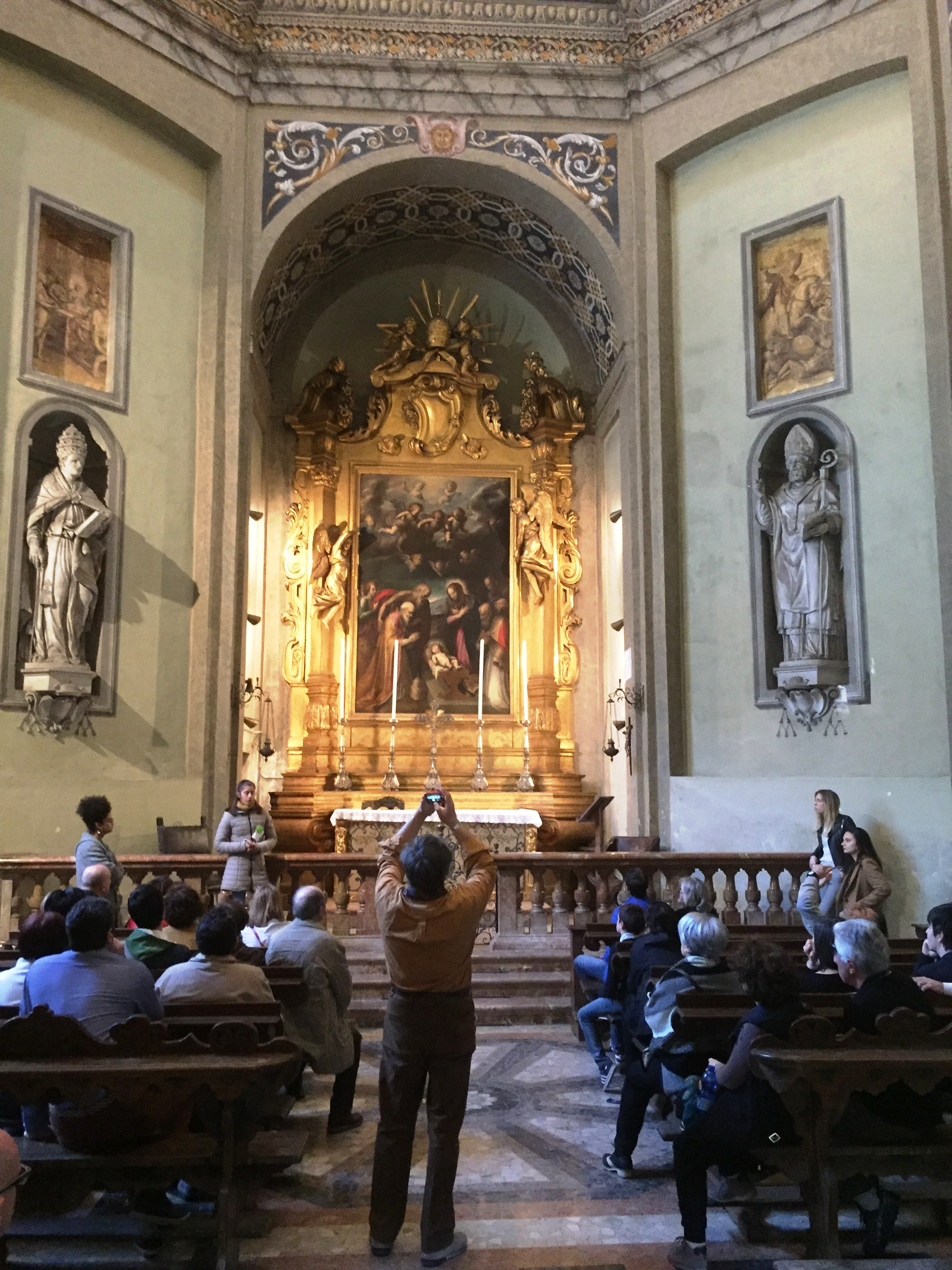
The chapel.

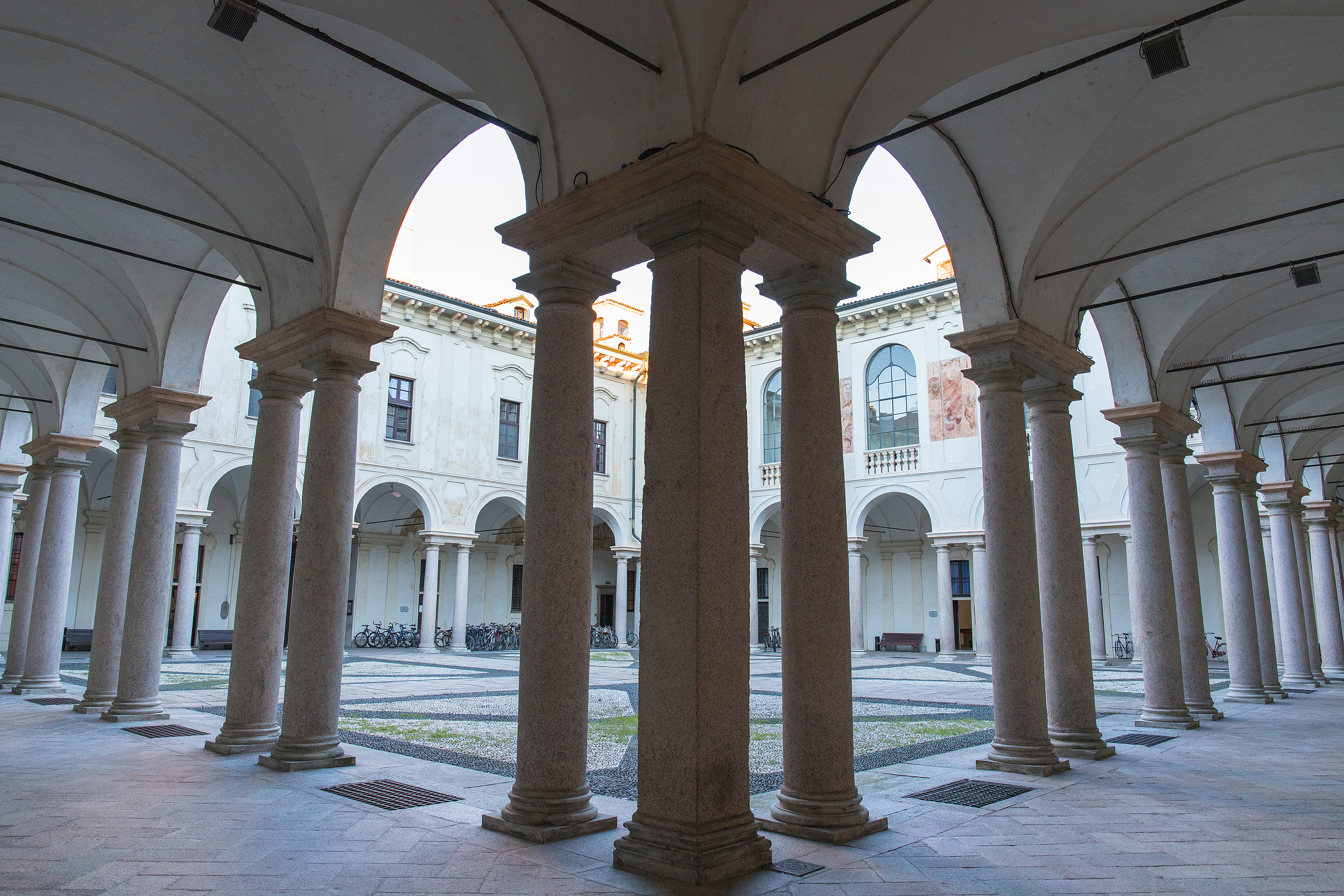
The porch.

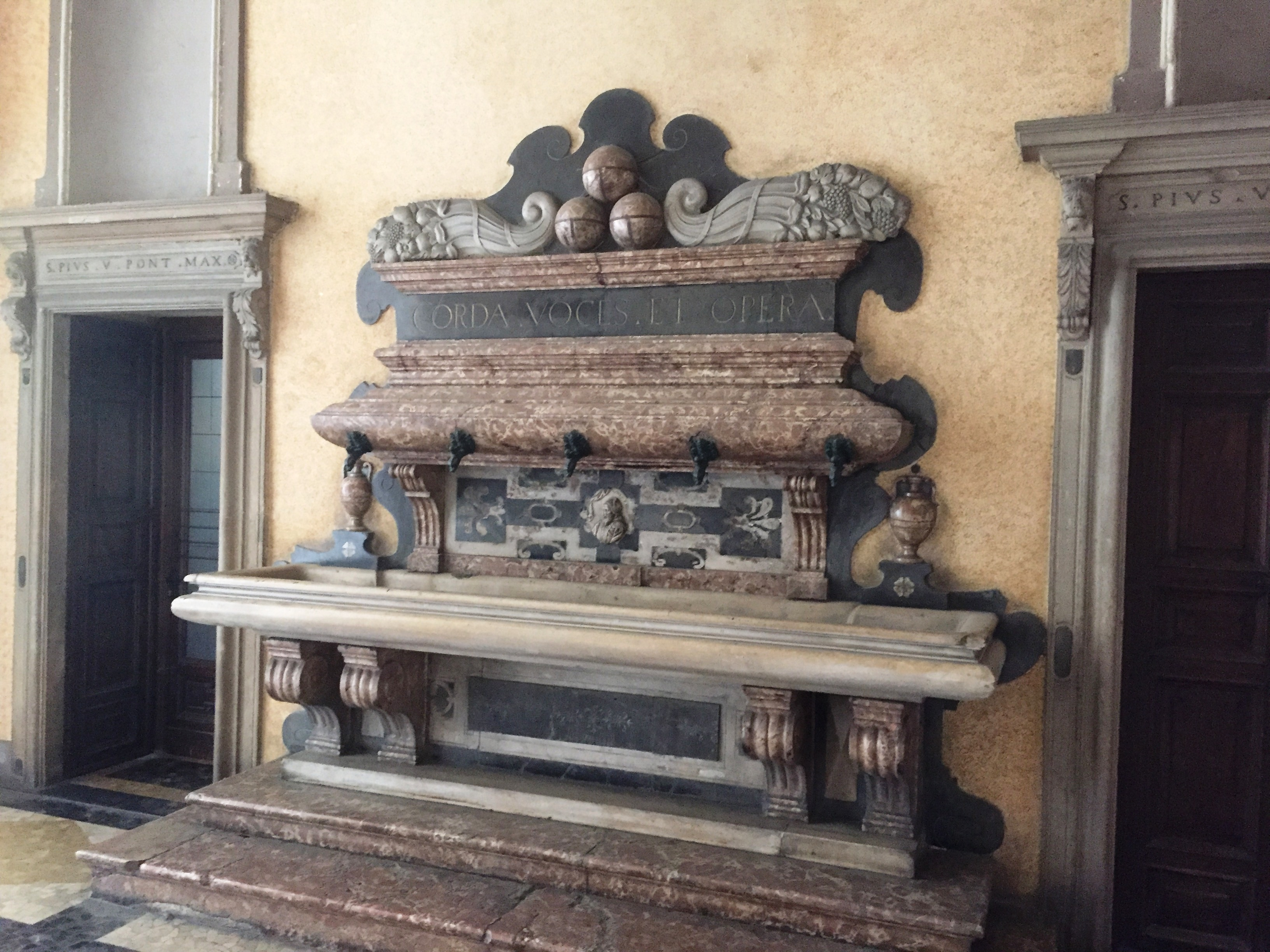
The washbasin, 16th century.

== Library ==
The constitutive bulls issued by Pius V did not foresee the existence of a library, even if in the College there were books owned by the institution, both bought directly from the founding pope, and forfeited when the abbey table of San Pietro in Ciel d'Oro was suppressed. They are mostly works of religious and philosophical content or of theology, but there are some very precious incunabula, including the Hypnerotomachia Poliphili. The oldest works still kept in the Library should date back to this original nucleus, even if it was partly lost in the 18th century when, by the will of Maria Theresa of Austria, the "library" of the College was first moved to the Palazzo Malaspina (1771) and then merged with the university one and transferred there. After the transfer of the book material from Ghislieri to the University, Abbot Gregorio Fontana, professor of Mathematics at the University of Pavia, and after him the various spiritual directors were given the task of reconstituting a library inside the boarding school, with sums allocated in Ghislieri's budget. A privileged channel of access was that followed by the works owned by the suppressed Society of Jesus and in particular by the Braidense library. But the Austrian monarchy, which in the mid-eighteenth century had taken control of the College showing considerable openness towards European culture in every branch, during the Restoration age imposed its own censorship on the library, distrusting ideas that entered the cultural circuit. of the French Revolution. This situation only ceased with the unification of Italy, which allowed the library to continue to enrich itself with works aimed at deepening the topics of university courses, but also of general culture. Among the privileged channels for enriching the book material there were acquisitions through bequests or donations, among which those of Pietro Ciapessoni, rector of the College and illustrious historian of Roman law, and Alessandro Pellegrini, Germanist and scholar of languages and European cultures. The library now houses about 130,000 volumes: alongside textbooks freely for students, there are not only works of fiction and non-fiction, but also encyclopedias, repertoires and bibliographic tools for every area of knowledge.

== The castle of Lardirago ==
In 1569 Pope Pius V ordered the attribution to the college of the fiefdom of Lardirago, with its early medieval castle, and of the fiefdom of Gerenzago, formerly owned by the abbey of San Pietro in Ciel d'Oro: the necessary revenues were thus guaranteed to fulfill Ghislieri's institutional tasks, and an autonomy of management that has never ceased over the centuries.

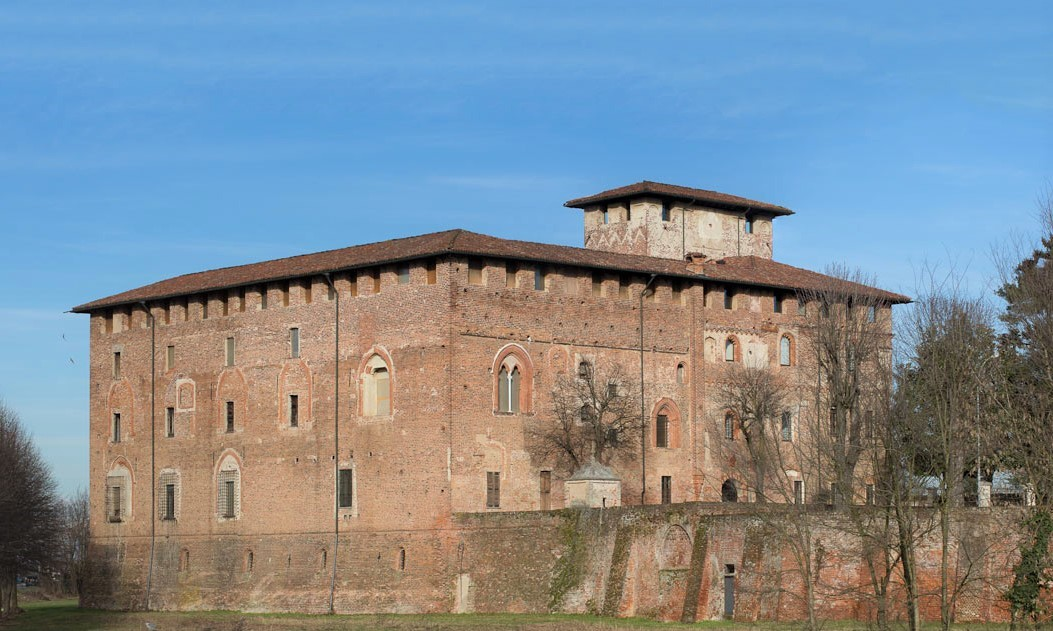
Castle of Lardirago

The castle of Lardirago, born in the twelfth and thirteenth centuries as a defensive structure, became a noble residence in the Visconti-Sforza era. The result of successive building phases, it assumed its present structure in the fourteenth century starting from the original Romanesque nucleus of the chapel. The Ghislieri college has promoted and financed the restoration of the castle as a venue for multiple cultural activities: congresses and conferences, specialization and refresher courses, scientific seminars and exhibitions.
