= James Joseph DeMartis =

American painter

- Born: March 30, 1926; Corona, New York, U.S.
- Died: December 17, 1996 (aged 70); Waterbury, Connecticut, U.S.
- Education: Accademia di Belle Arti di Firenze
- Known for: Painting

James Joseph DeMartis (March 30, 1926 – December 17, 1996) was an American painter of the post-World War II generation who explored a wide variety of styles and media; he is best known for his abstract expressionist works.

== Early life and education ==
DeMartis was born in Corona, New York, and attended Forest Hills High School from 1940 to 1943. Afterward he served in the US military from 1944 to 1945 as an army rifleman in the 23rd Infantry, serving in Belgium and Germany. After being wounded in battle, DeMartis was awarded the Purple Heart and during rehabilitation he began taking art classes. Discharged in 1945, he attended the War Veteran Art Center at the Museum of Modern Art in New York City from 1946 to 1947 and took classes at the Art Students League of New York. This was followed by two years' training at the California School of Fine Arts in Santa Monica, California, from 1947 to 1949. After a stint serving in the Merchant Marines, DeMartis decided to devote himself full time to painting. With funding from a G.I. Bill, DeMartis left for Europe in October 1950, traveling to France and Italy. He settled in Florence where he attended the Accademia di Belle Arti di Firenze from 1950 to 1954.

== Early artistic training and influences ==
Throughout his early period, DeMartis was continuously sketching and painting, "even aboard ship as an oiler in the engine room, he found time to sketch." In these early years he continuously experimented with various media, developing his unique artistic style. In Florence, one of his teachers at the Accademia di Belle Arti di Firenze was the painter Ottone Rosai and DeMartis' paintings from the 1950s have echoes of the post-macchiaioli school of painters. He also experimented in his early years with a style that has been said to have "reminiscences of Rouault and the Expressionists." "In earlier canvases, executed in the 50s, there is a concern with perspective, shadow and light and the formal concerns that characterize much objective easel painting. DeMartis' palette is dark and somber, with Rouault-like outlinings in the still life pieces."

== Painting of the 1960s and 1970s ==
In the following decade, DeMartis' style acquired a certain lightness, with numerous treatments of landscape: "The impressionistic, lighter-toned treatments of Maine countryside and seaside in the late 1960s demonstrated the artist’s movement toward movement. Instead of the frozen moment, timeless aspect of the Tuscan landscapes of the 50s, the artist, in the next decade, translates the traditional subject matter of sailing ships and Maine coastline into kinetic dynamic compositions, lyrical with color and light." In the 1970s DeMartis began working largely on abstract painting, where "color and texture convey meaning and mood. DeMartis in the 70s has a freer, lighter touch. His washes of color and stipple brush strokes belted in a broad ribbon of color that ‘frames out' each composition are far removed from the heavily tooled, often overworked abstractions of the 50s." A reviewer described DeMartis' oil paintings in a 1974 show in the following terms: "Smoky grays and neutrals take on the bold colors of Chagall’s or Dufy’s palette to create these frozen moments that seem to melt upon scrutiny. Each of the paintings has a painted frame, as Seurat supplied."

== Late work from 1980 through 1996 ==
DeMartis' late style between the 1980s and 1990s has been characterized as "a blend of romantic realism and abstract expressionism. Landscapes, figures, still lifes and abstract works dominate his subject matter. The paint is applied in a lush impasto and lyric flowing line."

== Personal life ==
In 1952 DeMartis married Silvana Cioli, and the couple had two children, Stephen and Barbara. In 1956, he returned to the United States, living first in Queens, and then Brooklyn. After the death of Silvana in 1966, DeMartis married Gilda DiMarco in 1968, and they had one child, James Michael, in 1968. The couple divorced in 1971. In 1989 he moved to North Adams, Massachusetts, and also spent time in a winter house in Bisbee, Arizona between 1991 and 1992, before finally moving to Copake, New York, in 1992.

DeMartis died in Waterbury, Connecticut, in December 1996.

== Prizes ==
1962 Joe and Emily Lowe award for painting.
