= Quinto Martini =

Quinto Martini may refer to:

- Quinto Martini (artist) (1908–1990), Italian artist and writer
- Quinto Martini (politician) (1908–1975), Canadian politician
