= Zang Tumb Tumb =

1914 poem by F. T. Marinetti

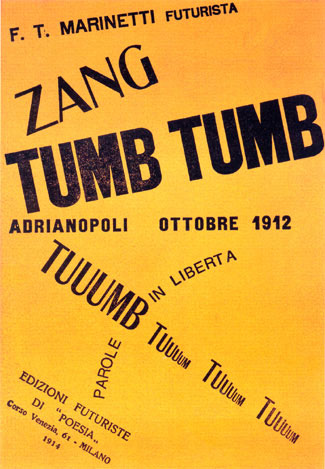
Cover of Zang Tumb Tuuum 1914

Zang Tumb Tumb (usually referred to as Zang Tumb Tuuum) is a sound poem and concrete poem written by Filippo Tommaso Marinetti, an Italian futurist. It appeared in excerpts in journals between 1912 and 1914, when it was published as an artist's book in Milan. It is an account of the Battle of Adrianople, which he witnessed as a reporter for L'Intransigeant. The poem uses Parole in libertà (words in freedom; creative typography) and other poetic impressions of the events of the battle, including the sounds of gunfire and explosions. The work is now seen as a seminal work of modernist art, and an enormous influence on the emerging culture of European avant-garde print.

"[The] masterpiece of Words-in-freedom and of Marinetti’s literary career was the novel Zang Tumb Tuuum... the story of the siege by the Bulgarians of Turkish Adrianople in the Balkan War, which Marinetti had witnessed as a war reporter. The dynamic rhythms and onomatopoetic possibilities that the new form offered were made even more effective through the revolutionary use of different typefaces, forms and graphic arrangements and sizes that became a distinctive part of Futurism. In Zang Tumb Tuuum; they are used to express an extraordinary range of different moods and speeds, quite apart from the noise and chaos of battle.... Audiences in London, Berlin and Rome alike were bowled over by the tongue-twisting vitality with which Marinetti declaimed Zang Tumb Tuuum. As an extended sound poem it stands as one of the monuments of experimental literature, its telegraphic barrage of nouns, colours, exclamations and directions pouring out in the screeching of trains, the rat-a-tat-tat of gunfire, and the clatter of telegraphic messages." — Caroline Tisdall and Angelo Bozzola

== The birth of futurism ==
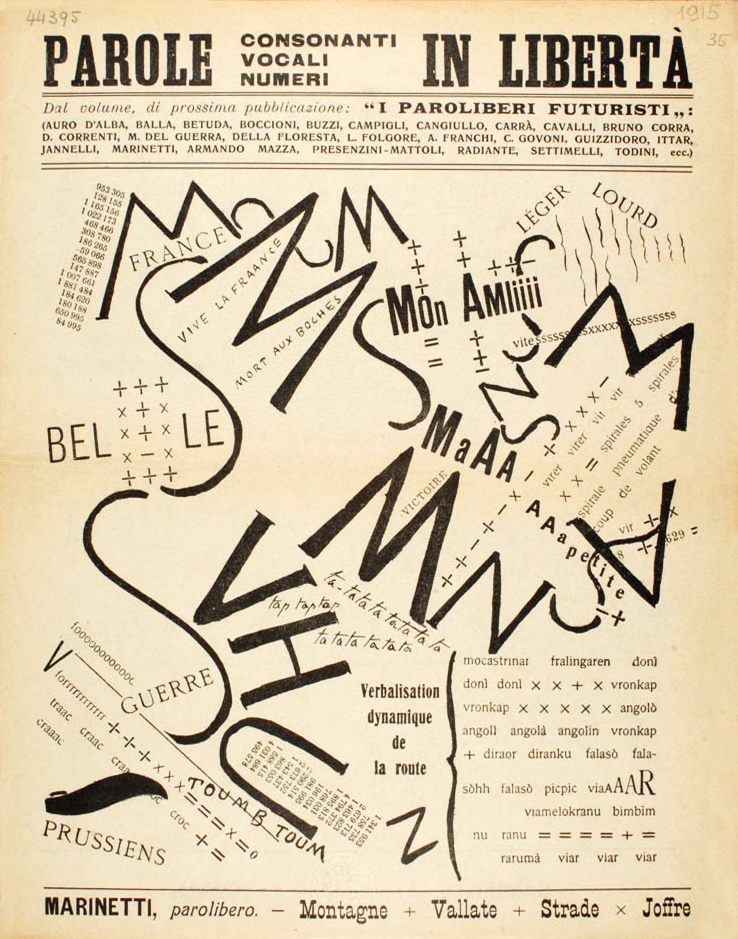
Après la Marne, Joffre visita le front en auto (After the Marne, Joffre Visited the Front by Car), by Marinetti, 1915

According to Marinetti, futurism was born as a direct consequence of a 1908 car crash in which, attempting to avoid two cyclists, he crashed his Fiat and went flying head over heels into a ditch. The experience led directly to the first futurist manifesto, which achieved an extraordinary coup-de-theâtre when he persuaded the editor of Le Figaro to publish the entire manifesto on the front page, February 20th, 1909. Amongst a series of exhortations to replace the 'pensive, immobile' traditional literature with 'exalt[ed] movements of aggression, feverish sleeplessness ... the slap and the blow with the fist.' and 'want[ing] to glorify war – the only cure for the world', the piece includes the famous line:

We declare that the splendor of the world has been enriched by a new beauty: the beauty of speed ... a roaring motor car which seems to run on machine-gun fire, is more beautiful than the Victory of Samothrace.

In a slightly later manifesto, contemporaneous with Zang Tumb Tuuum, Marinetti sets out a vision of modern book design which would provide the template for what would become known as the artist's book, in direct contrast to the French tradition of Livre d'Artiste.

I call for a typographic revolution directed against the idiotic and nauseating concepts of the outdated and conventional book, with its handmade paper and seventeenth century ornamentation of garlands and goddesses, huge initials and mythological vegetation, its missal ribbons and epigraphs and roman numerals. The book must be the Futurist expression of our futurist ideasm ... even more: My revolution is directed against what is known as the typographic harmony of the page, which is contrary to the flux and movement of style. — Marinetti, Typographic Revolution, 1913

=== Fascism and futurism ===
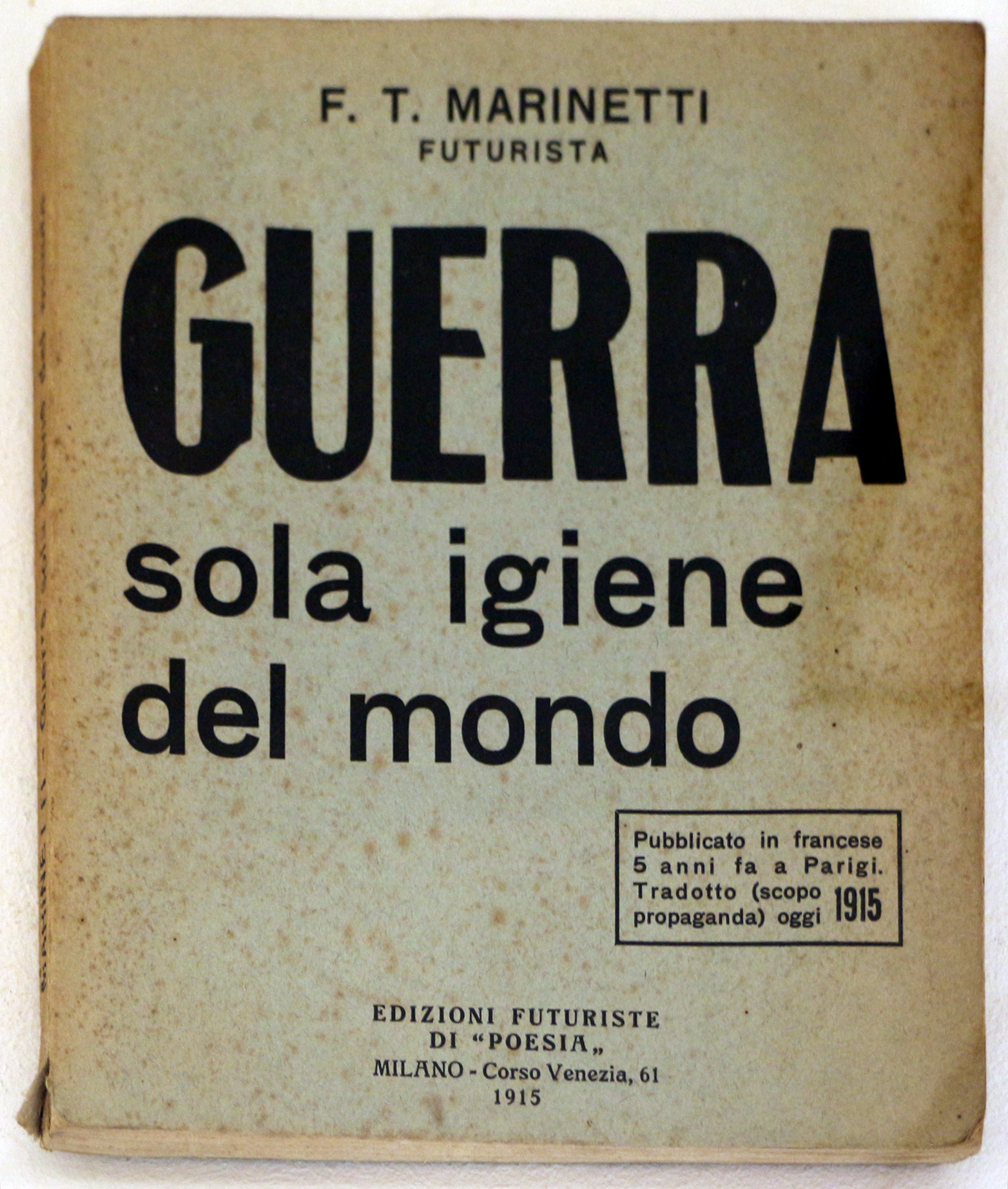
Guerra sola igiene del mondo

Latter-day admirers of Marinetti tend to see him as an iconoclastic and subversive anti-hero in revolt against an oppressive society, downplaying his role in the founding of Italian Fascism. The Futurist Political Party which Marinetti had founded was absorbed into the National Fascist Party (PNF) of Italy, and he co-wrote with Alceste De Ambris the Fascist Manifesto. "The Doctrine of Fascism" (the PNF's final manifesto) contains a considerable amount of (uncredited) block quotations from The Founding Manifesto of Futurism. Marinetti had organised a punch-up between futurists in Milan, September 1914, to support Italy's entry into the war; in a similar demonstration in May 1915, both he and Benito Mussolini were arrested. The same year Marinetti published the futurist compilation Guerra sola igiene del mondo (War the only world hygiene, 1915) – a polemic to encourage Italy to enter World War I.

== The book ==
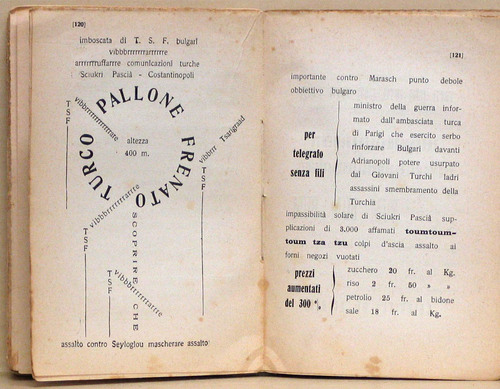
Turkish Balloon, an inner spread from Zang Tumb Tuuum, 1914. This copy is in MOMA's collection.

The book is a 228-page softback which includes foldout pages as part of the poem. The poem opens with Corrections of Proofs & Desires;

'No poetry before us
with our wireless imagination
and words in freedom LOOOng live
Futurism finally finally finally finally finally finally finally
Poetry being BORN

and ends with Bombardment;

'1 2 3 4 5 seconds siege guns split the silence in unison tam-tuuumb sudden echoes all the echoes seize it quick smash it scatter it to the infinite winds to the devil

'In the middle these tam-tuuumb flattened 50 square kilometers leap 2-6-8 crashes clubs punches bashes quick-firing batteries. Violence ferocity regularity pendulum play fatality

'...these weights thicknesses sounds smells molecular whirlwinds chains nets and channels of analogies concurrences and synchronisms for my Futurist friends poets painters and musicians zang-tumb-tumb-zang-zang-tuuumb tatatatatatatata picpacpampacpacpicpampampac uuuuuuuuuuuuuuu

ZANG-TUMB
TUMB-TUMB
TUUUUUM

In keeping with a number of early artist's books, the book also contains essays and manifestoes, including the Manifesto tecnico della letteratura Futurista (technical manifesto of futurist literature) (11 May 1912) 'which was to revolutionize poetic techniques and contemporary prose' and includes the lines;

'We must destroy syntax by placing nouns at random as they are born'

'We must abolish the adjective so that the naked noun can retain its essential colour.'

The book is an unsigned, unnumbered mass-produced paperback that depends exclusively on industrial typography for its visual impact, making it one of the first artist's books to eschew some form of craftsmanship. The book originally cost 3 lire.

== International promotional tours ==
Marinetti promoted his ideas by continually travelling across Europe giving recitations; as well as giving 'riotous soirées' throughout Italy, he travelled to Russia in 1910 and 1913, Paris 1912 and 1914, Berlin and Brussels in 1912, and London in 1911, 1912 and 1914. This last recital, on June 12, 1914, became notorious when, during a performance of The Battle Of Adrianople with CRW Nevinson on drums, a group of disgruntled vorticists, including Wyndham Lewis, Henri Gaudier-Brzeska and Jacob Epstein interrupted the performance, jeering and shouting to protest at Marinetti's co-opting of vorticists' signatures to an English translation of the Futurist Manifesto. On another occasion at the Lyceum Club, 1911, Marinetti challenged an Irish journalist to a duel after a perceived slight against the Italian Army. Largely as a result of these tours, and the ease in which his publications including Zang Tumb Tumb could be distributed and disseminated, Futurism was better known than Cubism before World War I, and in England at least had become a synonym by the English press to simply mean any forward-looking trends in modern art.

== Influence ==
The poem inspired Luigi Russolo to start experimenting with noise music, and is quoted in his Manifesto in 1913, later published in his book The Art of Noises in 1916. Sections were reproduced in Cabaret Voltaire, the first journal published by Dada.

The innovative use of typography has influenced a number of artists including Balla, Carra, Boccioni, Hugo Ball and Dada, the Russian futurists, the Vorticists including Wyndham Lewis, Guillaume Apollinaire, Blaise Cendrars, Max Jacob, El Lissitzky and Jan Tschichold. The emphasis on what has since become known as concrete poetry has proved a durable and lasting influence on the development of 20th-century art.

'...all in all, Futurist "art" [painting] was a blind alley. Instead, we can see that what Futurism did was to reassign leadership in the visual arts from painters to designers. Anyone who has admired a poster and found fine art wanting is in touch with the spirit of Marinetti.... In fact, Futurism was more like a marketing campaign than an artistic movement. Their fascination with and exploitation of mass media anticipated and influenced advertising in the 20th century.' – Stephen Bayley

== Current value ==
Christie's sold a copy of the book in reasonable condition for €10630 in 2011, another copy was valued at around £2000 ($3000) in 2009, and an inscribed copy sold for £2600 in London in May 2008. This is in stark contrast to its value (and reputation) for many years after World War II; a copy was bought by the Tate c.1979 for £65, and as recently as 1993 a copy was sold in London for £250.

Copies can be found in numerous public collections, including the Tate, MOMA, V&A, British Library, and the Penn Library.

== Homages ==
The ZTT Records label and the Swedish 80s new wave pop act Zzzang Tumb were named in homage to the poem.

== See also ==
- Futurist Manifesto
- Futurism (literature)
- BLAST magazine, a Vorticist magazine directly influenced by Zang Tumb Tumb
- Futurism (music)
- Russian Futurism, a sister movement in Russia.
- Ardengo Soffici, the most important futurist poet after Marinetti
- BÏF§ZF+18, Soffici's most important collection of futurist verse.
- Fortunato Depero, another important futurist book artist.
