= Quinto Martini (artist) =

Italian painter (1908–1990)

Quinto Martini (1908–1990) was an Italian artist and writer, born in Seano, Tuscany.

== Training ==
He was a self-taught artist, born in a farming family and raised among the hills behind Leonardo da Vinci's land. Martini was discovered by the artist Ardengo Soffici in 1926, when he went to visit Soffici's workshop in Poggio a Caiano, close to Seano, where the latter retired to paint the nature and traditional Tuscan farmers' world. Looking at the young Martini's first experiments, the maestro Soffici recognised the kind of genuine and intimate traits he valued in traditional Italian art. Quinto Martini was then taught drawing and art techniques, and exposed to art and literature with Soffici as his patron and mentor. In Soffici's library, Quinto Martini studied the French Impressionists and other modern artists: Cézanne, Degas, Picasso and the cubists, as well as Italian artists such as Giorgio Morandi, Armando Spadini, and the futurists.

In Prato, the closest city to his hometown, Quinto Martini joined a group of workers, intellectuals, and artists spontaneously formed in 1925. Among those artists were Oscar Gallo, Leonetto Tintori, Gino Brogi, and Arrigo Del Rigo. Almost all of them studied at the "Leonardo" Art School of Prato, and were inspired by Ardengo Soffici and by the movement "Il Selvaggio".

In February 1927, still under the aegis of Soffici, Martini was invited to participate in the collective exhibition il Selvaggio, together with Mino Maccari, Carlo Carrà, Ottone Rosai, Giorgio Morandi, Achille Lega, Pio Semenghini, Nicola Galante and Evaristo Boncinelli. He later published in the same review il Selvaggio etchings and drawings, entering the Florence artists' and intellectuals' world.

Between 1928 and 1929 Quinto Martini went to Turin for military service, where he moved in bohemian cafés and cultural circles enlivened by a Parisian avant-garde atmosphere. There Martini met Felice Casorati, Cesare Pavese and "The Six Painters" group, who were typical interpreters of an anti-fascist and communist-oriented culture inspired by the French Cézanne and Manet. In Turin the young artist encountered the intellectual Carlo Levi who would be, together with Soffici, one of the fundamental interlocutors of his life.

After a period of military service in Turin, in the early 1930s he started working on the "Mendicanti" series which he investigated again and again throughout his whole life production. Martini's mendicants are painted in a realistic manner, where their poverty is described through poverty of tools, and the figures are symbolically lengthened and bent to the earth. The sculptures of Quinto Martini were also inspired by the Etruscan style, which was deeply rooted in his area, where there are important Etruscan archaeological sites.

In 1935, Martini relocated from the Tuscan countryside to Florence, where he died in 1990.

== Quinto Martini as sculptor and mature artist ==
Across the 1930s and '40s, the artist's attention shifted progressively to sculpture. He used simple and "poor" terracotta, a material typical of his rural environment which was already common in the Seano area when the Etruscans settled and expressed their culture millennia before. Terracotta was like the mud from which Martini had moulded animal figures as a child, playing in the farm yard. One terracotta sculpture was "la ragazza seanese", which was unveiled at the XIX Biennale di Venezia in 1934. From that moment on, Quinto Martini gained the appreciation of the critics and the public.

From 1935 onward, Quinto Martini was present in all editions of the Quadriennale di Roma until the 1972–73 edition. At the 1939 edition, an entire salon was dedicated to his sculptures alone. In the same year, the artist published some of his etchings in the review Frontespizio which was gathering together the most relevant contemporary artists from Ottone Rosai to Giorgio Morandi, from Giacomo Manzù to Fiorenzo Tomea, and also important writers like Mario Luzi and Carlo Bo.

Quinto Martini participated in the XXth Biennale di Venezia edition, where his work was appreciated by the important Italian critic Giuseppe Marchiori. The review Domus published an interview with him, and he was the protagonist of some exhibitions in Florence, Milan, and Rome at the "Quadriennale d'arte nazionale". In the same years, the artist continued publishing drawings and etchings in the cultural reviews il Selvaggio, Frontespizio of the writer and politician Piero Bargellini, and in the art and literature review l'Orto from Bologna.

The "Mendicanti" series, some of which were displayed at the "Lyceum" in Florence in 1943, were considered to be against the regime's warlike propaganda. Quinto Martini was jailed shortly after the exhibition, together with Carlo Levi, in the same prison where his brother had been kept for almost fifteen years. Once released, the artist went into hiding in the Chianti countryside to avoid being captured by the Nazis. In that period he wrote the novel I giorni sono lunghi (The Days Are Long) to render that experience memorable, which was published in 1957 with a preface from Levi himself. Intimate reflections expressed in verses opened Martini's road to poetry. Across the '50s and '60s, Quinto Martini published some tales and poems for the "Nuovo Corriere" of Florence, while many more remain still unpublished. In 1974, his second novel, Chi ha paura va alla guerra, was published in Catanzaro by Frama's Publisher, edited by Pasquino Crupi, and tells the story of a deserter during the First World War.

With clear inspiration and sound form of expression, the artist animated the "Nuovo Umanesimo" art group with Ugo Capocchini, Emanuele Cavalli, Giovanni Colacicchi, Oscar Gallo, and Onofrio Martinelli in 1947. Their "manifesto" announced their opposition to any concept of abstract art. Late in the 1940s Martini's sculptures won some first prizes at the national level, and early in the 1950s they started to be exhibited abroad. Quinto Martini's paintings turned into a mature revision of Ardengo Soffici's style, and experimentation with some of the 20th-century artistic currents, including cubism and futurism.

Quinto Martini paid particular attention to "Portraits" and to "the Rain" theme. The artist exercised portraiture since his first sculpture experiences, portraying relatives, friends, and peasants of his homeland. Many portraits were made in terracotta, plaster cast, and bronze of his mother, Ardengo Soffici, his wife Maria Ferri, often shown at important exhibitions. "Portraits" of artists, scholars, intellectuals were made by Quinto Martini from the end of the Second World War until his death, in a sort of continuous dialogue with them that lasted for decades and at times with repeated portraits across the years. In 1992, two years after the artist's death, 30 of these "Portraits" were exhibited in an exhibition hosted at Palazzo Strozzi in Florence, to realize a project that the artist imagined in 1984. The disastrous inundation of Florence in 1966 intensified the inspiration of Quinto Martini for "the Rain" theme, expressed through drawings and bas-reliefs, but also through operas in bronze. The poets and intellectuals Mario Luzi, Renzo Federici, Tommaso Paloscia, Carlo Levi, many of whom were subjects of the "Portraits" themselves, wrote about these operas hosted again in Palazzo Strozzi in 1978.

He was a professor of sculpture at the Accademia di Belle Arti in Florence from 1961 across the 1960s and 1970s. During the same years, the artist continued in his experimentation, developing the "Rain" theme and participating in exhibitions at the national and international level like the International Small Bronze Competition. Some of his small bronzes were exhibited at the "Contemporary Italian Sculptors" exhibition in 1970, which went on world tour (Florence, Budapest, Milan, Buenos Aires, Mexico City, Rio de Janeiro, Montevideo, Tokyo, Osaka, Hakone, Strasbourg, and locations in the Netherlands).

Quinto Martini lectured at many conferences and symposia, and wrote a number of essays on the sculpture of Donatello, Michelangelo, Rodin, and others. Personal and anthologizing exhibitions have been widely shown in the 1970s and '80s.

Some of his most notable works were inspired by Dante's Divine Comedy, and he himself has been described as "an important fixture in the cultural and artistic life of 20th-century Florence." The artist dedicated to Dante's masterpiece a complete set of lithographs which toured in Rome, at the Biblioteca Nazionale Centrale di Firenze, and also in Warsaw and five different cities in the former U.S.S.R. Three books were published on this series of Martini.

== Places named for him ==
The Parco museo Quinto Martini was dedicated to the artist by his authorities and his countrymen in Seano in 1988, while Martini was still alive, and displays 36 of his bronzes, which were made throughout his entire artistic life, placed in an open-air setting.

The project of the Park is presented in the following publication: Presentazione del progetto del Parco – Museo con sculture di Quinto Martini, Comune di Carmignano, Regione Toscana, 1981.

The Municipality of Carmignano has instituted the Parco museo Quinto Martini Prize, aimed at emphasizing ideas and projects that are inspired by or intended to combine art and public spaces. In 2011, the first edition of the Prize went to the degree thesis of Ilaria Burzi, for her project titled: Former mine of Santa Barbara: contribution to the restoration project. The second Prize went to the thesis of Federica Cavallin for the project: Innovation and tradition. A project for the visual identity of the Passante Verde of Mestre.

The first edition of the Prize has been published: Premio Parco museo Quinto Martini. Un esempio d'arte nello spazio pubblico, Comune di Carmignano, Edizioni Masso delle Fate, 2012.

== Bibliography in Italian ==
- Quinto Martini. 30 ritratti. Scrittori e artisti 1948–1986, Catalogo, a cura di Marco Fagioli, della mostra tenuta a Firenze, Palazzo Strozzi, 1992, Florence, Polistampa, 1992.
- Quinto Martini. (1908–1990), Antologia di disegni e sculture, Catalogo, a cura di Giovanni Stefani e Marco Fagioli, della mostra tenuta nel 1994, prima a Cetona (Siena), Sala SS. Annunziata, poi a San Miniato (Pisa), Palazzo Migliorati Stefani. Florence, Edizioni Polistampa, 1994.
- Quinto Martini. Sculture e dipinti. Catalogo, a cura di Marco Fagioli, della mostra tenuta a Firenze, Galleria Il Ponte, 1995.
- L'accento interiore. Continuità della figura nella scultura toscana 1900–1940, Catalogo, a cura di Massimo Bertozzi, Ornella Casazza, Marco Moretti, della mostra tenuta a Massa, Palazzo Ducale, 1996.
- Colloquio col visibile. Fermenti artistici nella Firenze del dopoguerra, Catalogo della mostra tenuta a Monsummano Terme, Villa Renatico-Martini, 1996–1997.
- Parco-Museo Quinto Martini a Seano. Catalogo sculture, a cura di Marco Fagioli, Carmignano (Prato), 1997.
- Quinto Martini. 1908–1990, Catalogo, a cura di Marco Fagioli e Lucia Minunno, della mostra antologica tenuta a Firenze, Museo Marino Marini, 1999. Florence, Studio Per Edizioni Scelte, 1999.
- Quinto Martini. Arte e impegno civile, Catalogo della mostra tenuta nel 2000–2001, prima a Firenze, Villa Vogel-Capponi, poi a Follonica (Grosseto), Civica Pinacoteca A. Modigliani. Saggi di Marco Fagioli, Anna Mazzanti, Lucia Minunno. Florence, Edizioni Polistampa, 2000.
- Quinto Martini fra arte e letteratura, Atti della giornata di studio promossa dal Comune di Carmignano il 24 marzo 2001, a cura di Francesco Guerrieri.
- Quinto Martini, Poesie a colori, a cura di S. Albisani e T. Bigazzi, Florence, 2002.
- Quinto Martini. Pittore e scultore, Catalogo della mostra a cura di M. Fagioli, Florence, 2004.
- Quinto Martini. Omaggio a Dante. Bassorilievi, pitture, disegni, litografie, catalogo della mostra a cura di L. Martini e T. Bigazzi Martini, Florence, 2006.
- Quinto Martini ad Arezzo, Daniela Meli, Arezzo. Florence, AIÓN Edizioni, 2008.
- Quinto Martini. I bronzetti, catalogo della mostra a cura di Lucia Minunno, Florence, AIÓN Edizioni, 2010.
- Quinto Martini, Testimone della storia, a cura di Stefano De Rosa, Florence, NICOMP L.E. Edizioni, 2011.
- Quinto Martini, Museo statale Ermitage San Pietroburgo, a cura di Consuelo de Gara, Florence, Mandragora, 2013.
