= Il Selvaggio =

Arts and political magazine in Italy (1924–1943)

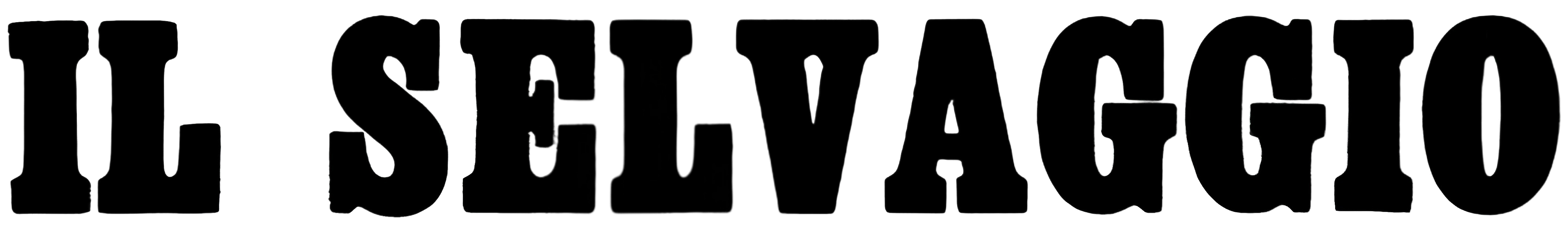

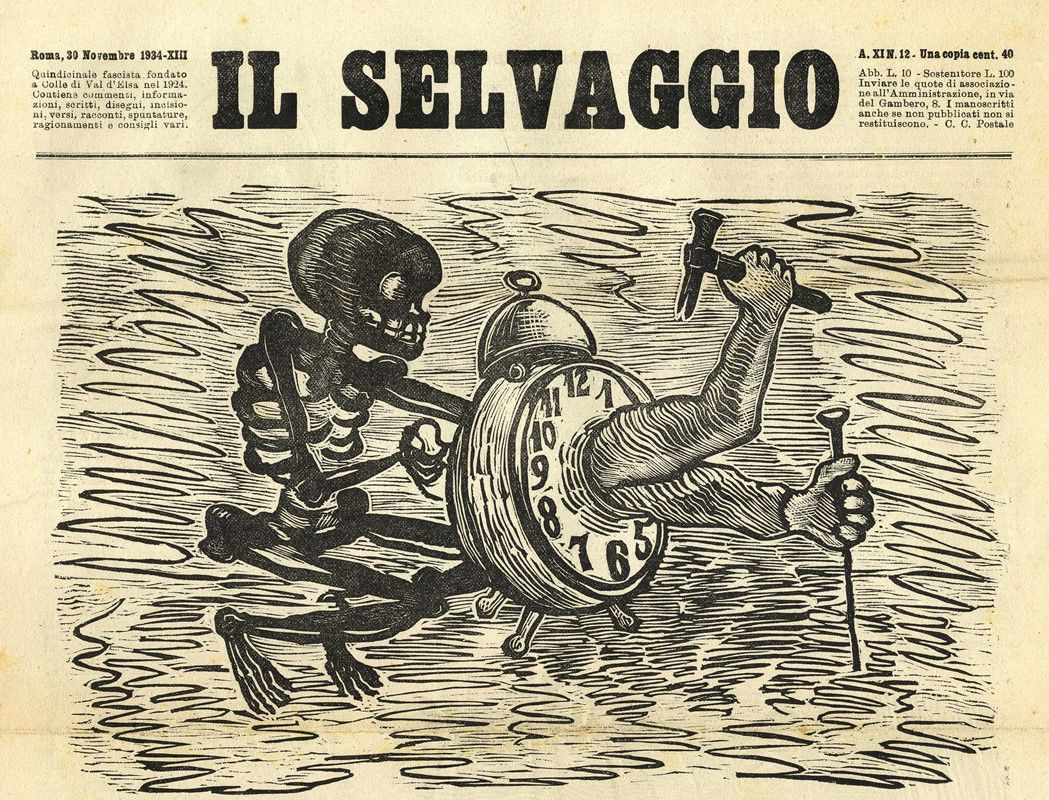
- Issue of 30 November 1934
- Editor-in-chief: Mino Maccari
- Former editors: Angelo Bencini
- Categories: Arts magazine; Political magazine
- Frequency: Bimonthly; Weekly; Irregular
- Founder: Angelo Bencini; Mino Maccari
- Founded: 1924
- First issue: 13 July 1924
- Final issue: June 1943
- Country: Italy
- Based in: Colle di Val d'Elsa; Siena; Turin; Rome
- Language: Italian
- ISSN: 2420-9376
- OCLC: 173994792

Il Selvaggio (Italian: the Savage or the Wild One) was a political and arts magazine that existed between 1924 and 1943. It was a media outlet of an intellectual group called Strapaese (Italian: Supervillage).

== History and profile ==
Il Selvaggio was founded by Angelo Bencini and Mino Maccari, an Italian fascist artist and journalist, in Colle di Val d'Elsa in 1924 as a political magazine. The first issue of the bimonthly magazine was published on 13 July 1924. The founding director was Angiolo Bencini who held the post until 1926 when Mino Maccari succeeded him. The latter also edited the magazine. It featured articles on art, politics and humor.

The format of the magazine was 50x35 cm, but was changed to 44x32 cm. It had a variable number of pages ranging from four to twelve pages. From 1926 Il Selvaggio was headquartered in Florence. The same year the Fascist government forced the magazine to include cultural and satirical materials, thus making clear its goal to promote a version of an anti-intellectual version of arts. Then the magazine focused on the core of the Italian spirit observed "in the cradle of Italian civilization, namely the hills and countryside of Tuscany". In this period it came out weekly and acted as a representative of Tuscan rural extremism.

The editorial offices of Il Selvaggio moved to Siena in 1929 and then to Turin in 1930. In 1932 its headquarters moved to Rome. The frequency of the magazine was also frequently changed but was mostly published irregularly. Leo Longanesi, Ardengo Soffici, Carlo Carrà, Cafiero Tuti, Mario Tinti, Manlio Malabotta, Amerigo Bartoli Natinguerra, Giuseppe Pensabene and Ottone Rosai were among the leading contributors of the magazine. In 1932 Soffici published articles on his experience in Paris in the early years of the 20th century in the magazine. Over time Il Selvaggio focused on artistic subjects, including architectural topics, instead of political topics. The last issue of the magazine appeared in June 1943.
