= Volognano =

- Frazione
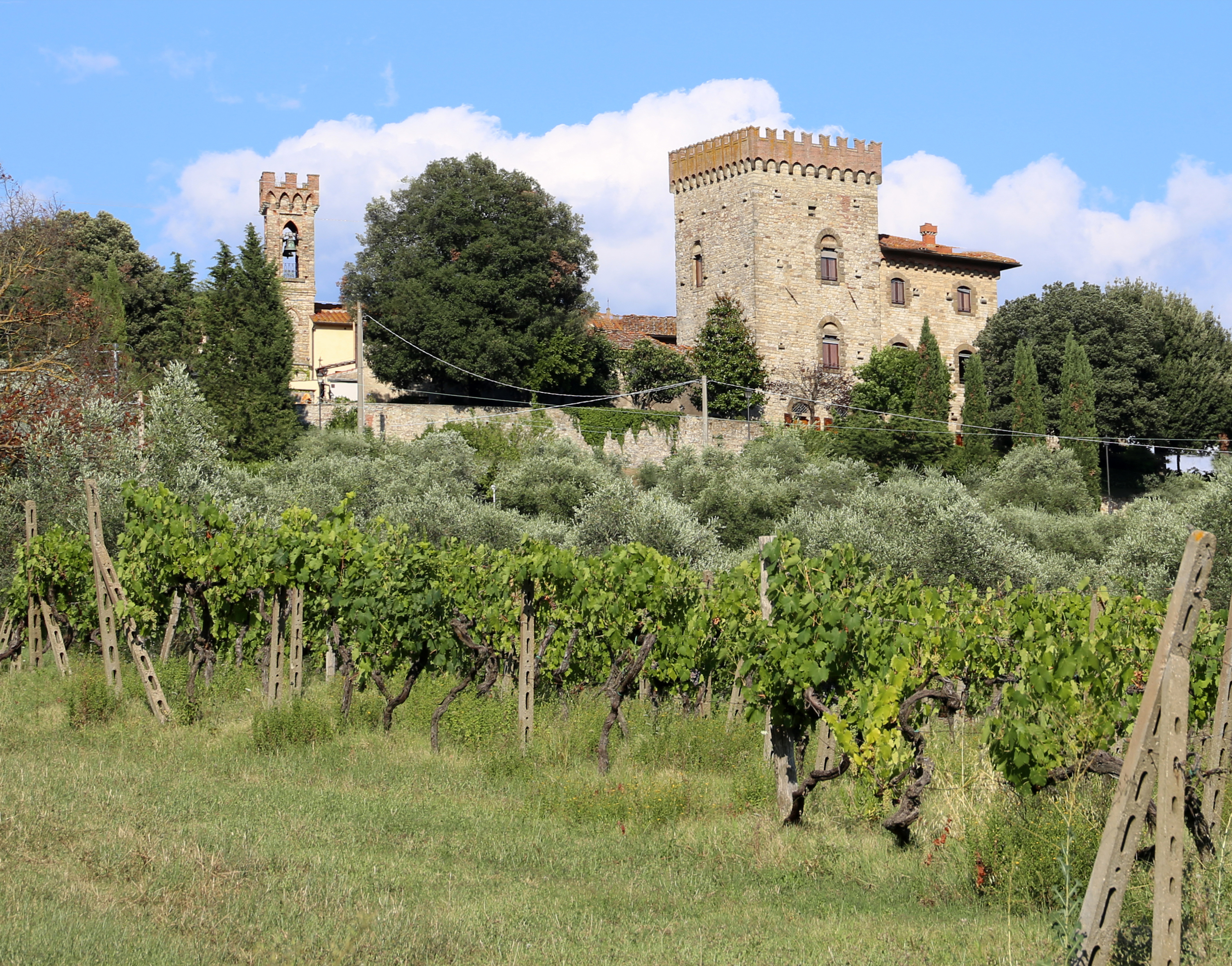

- Location of Volognano in Italy
- Coordinates: 43°45′30.31″N 11°26′53.59″E
- Country: Italy
- Region: Tuscany
- Province: Florence (FI)
- Comune: Rignano sull'Arno

Population (2001)
  - Total: 24
- Time zone: UTC+1 (CET)
  - Summer (DST): UTC+2 (CEST)

Volognano is a village (frazione) located in the municipality of Rignano sull'Arno, in the Metropolitan City of Florence, Tuscany.

The settlement is known thanks to the eponymous castle which overlooks the crest of one of the last hills that slope down towards the Arno River, close to its confluence with the Sieve.

== Monuments ==
- Church of San Michele, known for its artworks, including a late-14th century Madonna with Child by Lorenzo di Bicci, an altarpiece by Mariotto Albertinelli (1514) and the Madonna of the Cintola (c. 1520), attributed to the workshop of Andrea del Sarto, to Domenico Puligo or to Rosso Fiorentino.
- Castle of Volognano (12th century)

== Sources ==
- Lembo, Roberto (2000). Rignano sull'Arno. Edifici, e segni di culto del territorio.
