= BÏF§ZF+18 =

Italian poetry book

BÏF§ZF+18 Simultaneità e Chimismi lirici (BÏF§ZF+18. Simultaneity and Lyrical Chemistry) is a poetry book and artist's book published in 1915 by the Italian futurist Ardengo Soffici. Despite its rarity, the book has become famous as one of the finest examples of futurist 'words-in-freedom', and has been described as 'absolutely the most important book that came out of Florentine Futurism'.

Originally printed in an edition of 300, the original book became even scarcer when the River Arno flooded in 1966, destroying many of the remaining copies.

'Of the futurist poets, Ardengo Soffici (1879–1965) produced some of the best experimental verse of the time. Painter, art and literary critic, Soffici was an active mediator between Italy and the French avant-garde.... BÏF§ZF+18 Simultaneità e Chimismi lirici, his collection of Futurist poems, is a collage of visual and auditory impressions that combine memory and sensation to give the effect of poetry in motion.' Peter Brand & Lino Pertile

== Futurism ==
After training at the Florence Accademia, Soffici moved to Paris in 1900; during this time, his circle of friends included Guillaume Apollinaire, André Derain and Picasso. After returning to Italy, he started to write art criticism for the Italian journal La Voce. In 1911, he wrote a negative review of a Milanese Futurist exhibition, which led to him being assaulted by the Italian futurists Marinetti, Boccioni and Carrà at the Le Giubbe Rosse café in Florence.

Soffici made his peace with the group, and exhibited works in the travelling Futurist exhibition held between 1912 and 1913 in Paris, Brussels, London, Berlin and Florence. BÏF§ZF+18 marks the highpoint of his involvement with the group; by 1916 he had begun to distance himself from the group, seeing 'Futurism as a once legitimate movement that had become a spent force '. After returning from active service in World War I, his work re-engaged with Tuscan traditionalism - in part due to his support for fascist ideology - and naturalistic landscapes became the mainstay of his art until his death in 1965.

== The book ==
Tipografia, a page from the Chimismi Lirici section. This copy is in The Getty Center

The book is divided into two roughly equal halves; the first, Simultaneita, contains 12 'simultaneous' poems laid out in standard typography; the second section, Chimismi Lirici, contains 10 poems that use multiple fonts, signs, adverts, brand names, repetition and onomatopoeiac devices that are contemporaneous to Marinetti's similar experiments in Zang Tumb Tumb, and prefigure Marinetti's later, more abstract Les Mots En Liberte Futuristes, 1919. (see )

=== Taken from Aeroplano ===
I would squeeze the joystick with a fist of air.

I hit the throttle with shoe to the sky;
Frrrrrr frrrrrr frrrrrr, drowned in the deep turquoise.
I eat violet blue,
Slices of azure;
I swallow tankards of cobalt blue,
Heavens of lapis lazuli,
Heavenly blue, light blue, celestial,
Prussian blue, dark heavenly, heavenly lumière;
I sink into a funnel of paradise.
Christ the aviator! I was made for this ascension to glorious poetic-military-sport
Rectangular angels of canvas and steel.
The black cube is the thought of return, that gate with my language turned on with the look of joy

As the white dial of the altimeter turns.

Translated from the Italian.

== Later editions ==
The book has been reprinted a number of times - although usually without the striking collaged cover designed by Soffici himself - firstly in 1919, and most recently by Vallecchi in 2002. The work has never been published in its entirety in translation.
