= Ottone Rosai =

Italian painter (1895–1957)

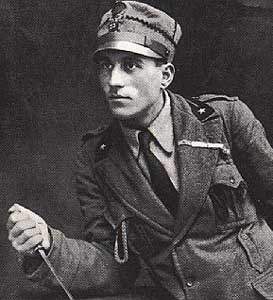
- Ottone Rosai during his service in the Arditi in 1918
- Born: 28 April 1895; Florence, Kingdom of Italy
- Died: 13 May 1957 (aged 62); Ivrea, Italy
- Education: Accademia di Belle Arti di Firenze
- Occupation: Painter

Signature
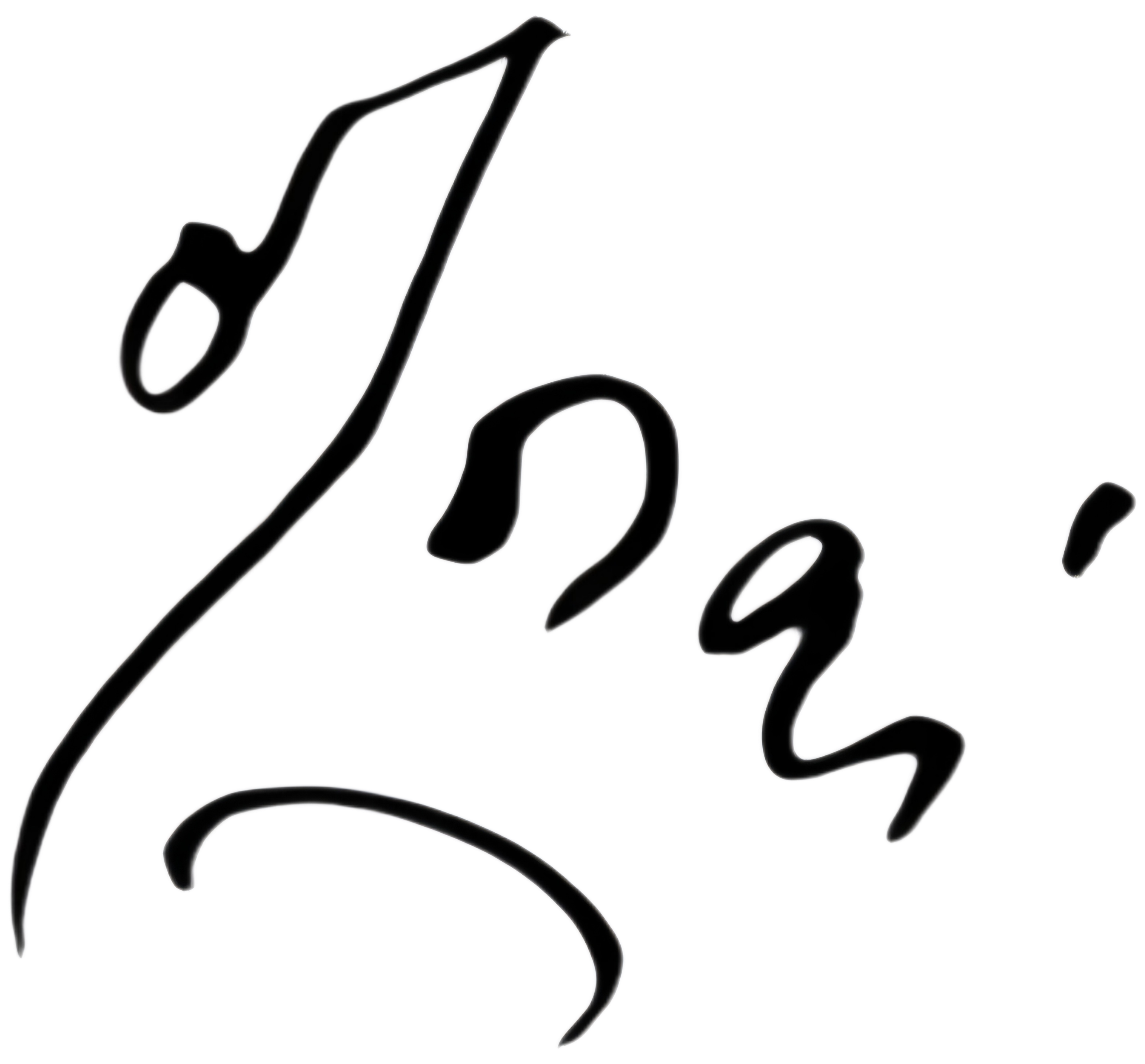

Ottone Rosai (28 April 1895 – 13 May 1957) was an Italian painter born in Florence, Italy.

== Biography ==
Rosai graduated from the Florence Academy of Fine Arts in 1912, a period in which he was closely associated with the Lacerba group of Florentine Futurists and especially Ardengo Soffici, with whom he held a joint exhibition at the Galleria Sprovieri, Rome, in 1914. He made his debut in 1913 at the Mostra del Bianco in Pistoia with the etching Case Civette, which was stylistically inspired by the works of Edward Gordon Craig. Rosai enlisted as a volunteer in the Royal Italian Army on 9 December 1914. Later on, in late 1917, he enlisted in the XIX Shock Battalion (later renamed to the XXIII) until the end of the war, serving as an adjutant, taking part in World War I, and earning a Bronze and a Silver Medal for Military Valor. Having returned to Florence after World War I, he adapted to the climate of the return to order and devoted himself to the study of early Italian painters. He held his first solo show at Palazzo Capponi in 1920, began contributing to the magazine Il Selvaggio in 1926, and took part in the Seconda Mostra del Novecento Italiano in Milan in 1929. Edoardo Persico organised a solo show of his work at the Galleria del Milione in 1930 and his participation in the Venice Biennale began by invitation with the 18th Esposizione Internazionale d'Arte della Città di Venezia in 1932. He obtained a teaching post at the Florence Academy of Fine Arts in 1942 and the Venice Biennale organised a large-scale retrospective of his work within the framework of the 28th Esposizione Internazionale d'Arte in 1956. He died in Ivrea (Turin) in 1957.

== Gallery ==
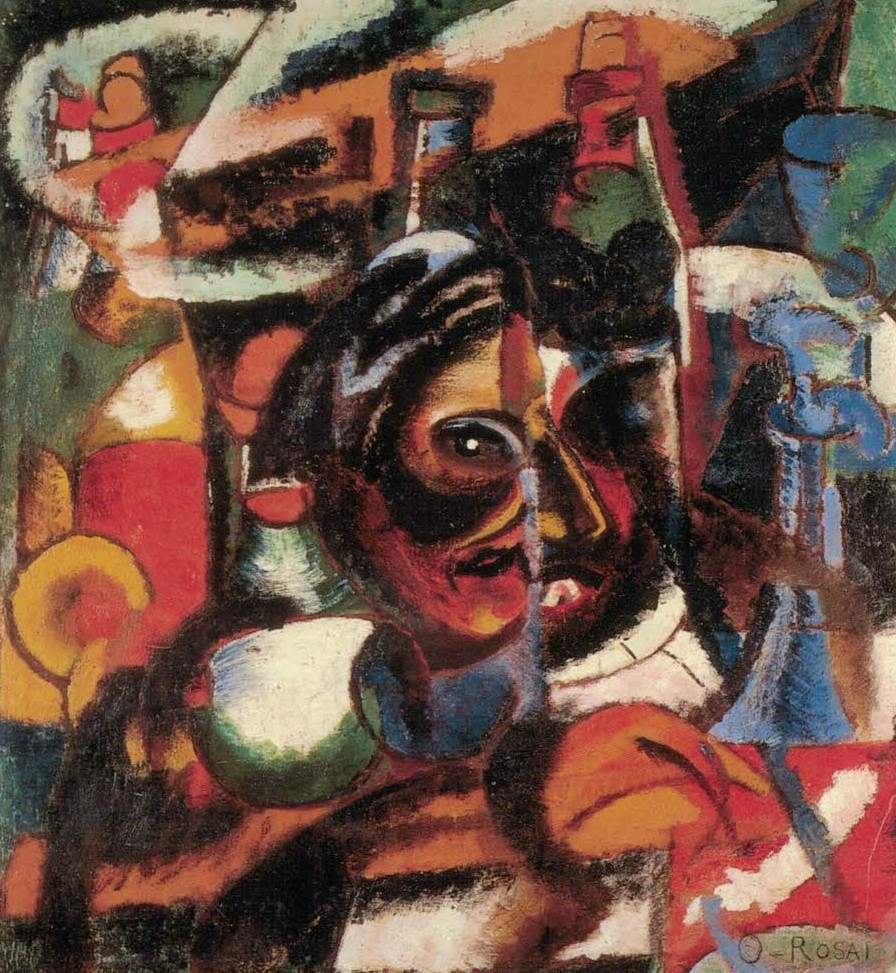
Dinamismo Bar Sanmarco, 1913 (Collezione Mattioli, Florence)

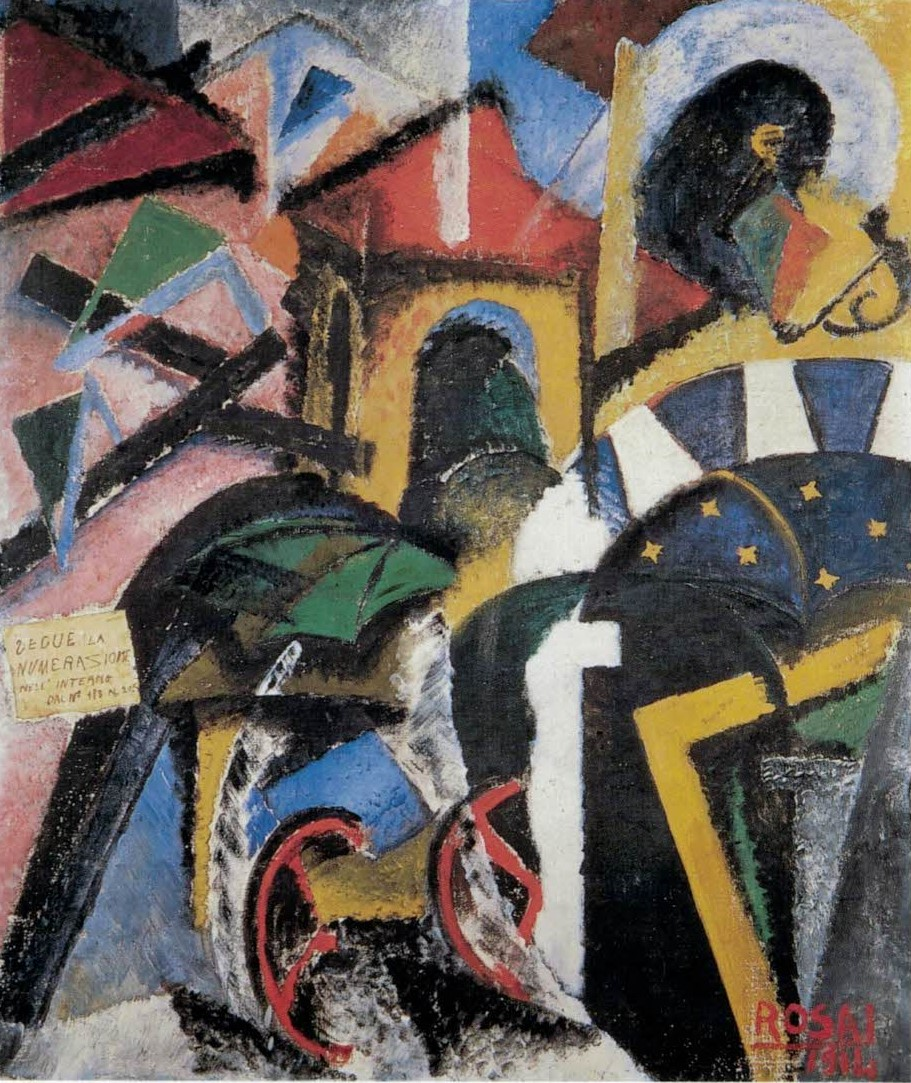
Scomposizione di una strada, 1914 (Collezione Mattioli, Florence)

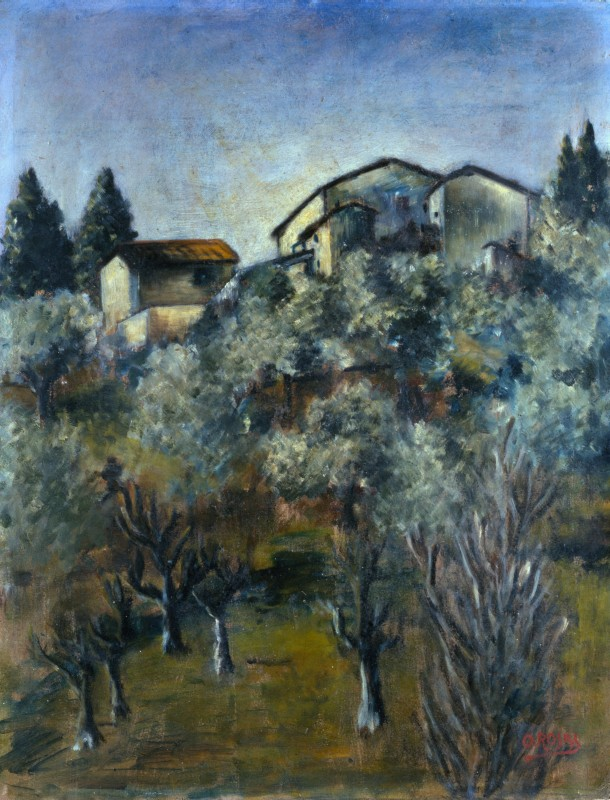
Paesaggio, c. 1922 (Fondazione Cariplo)

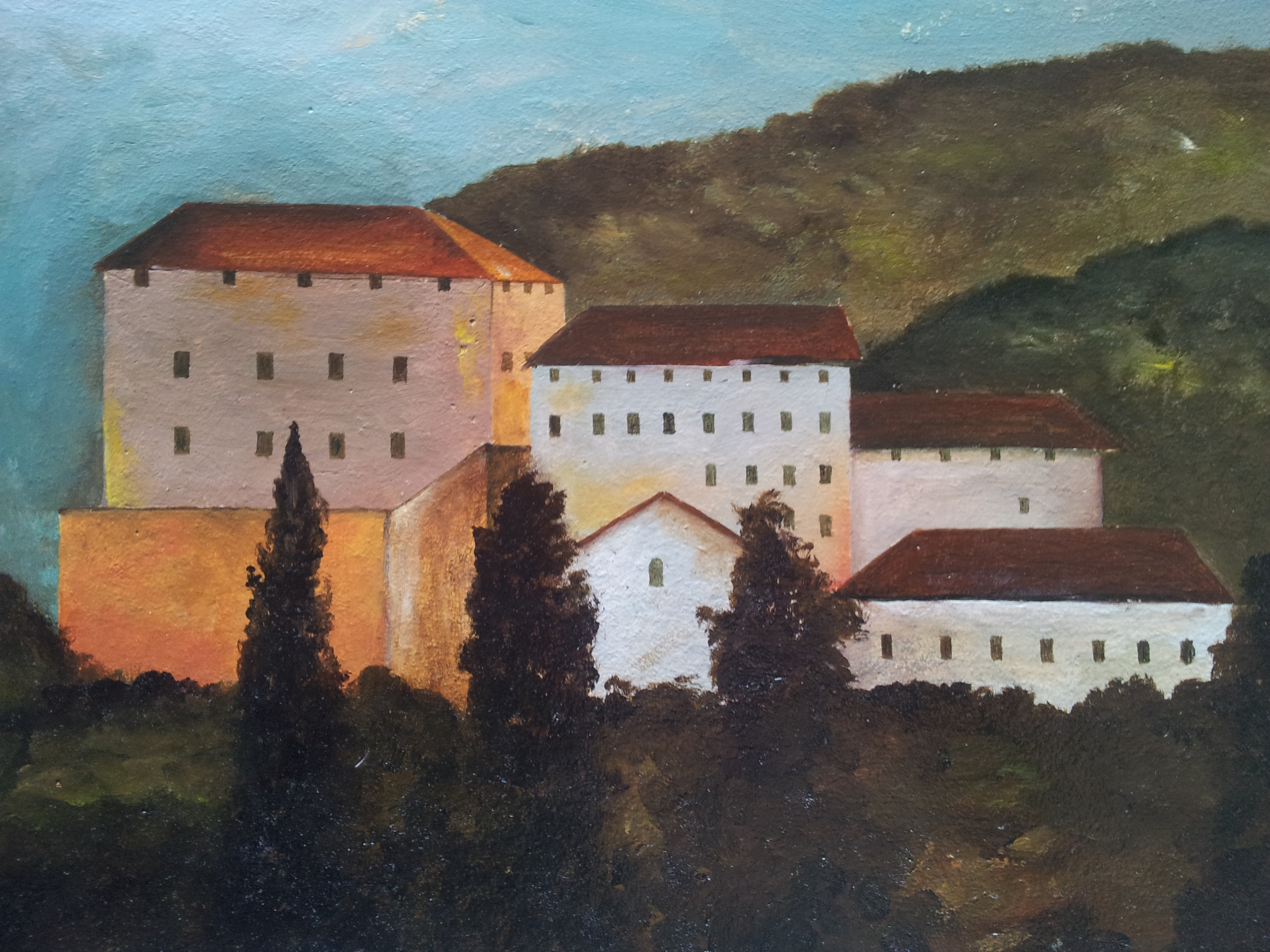
Belvedere, 1923, priv. col.

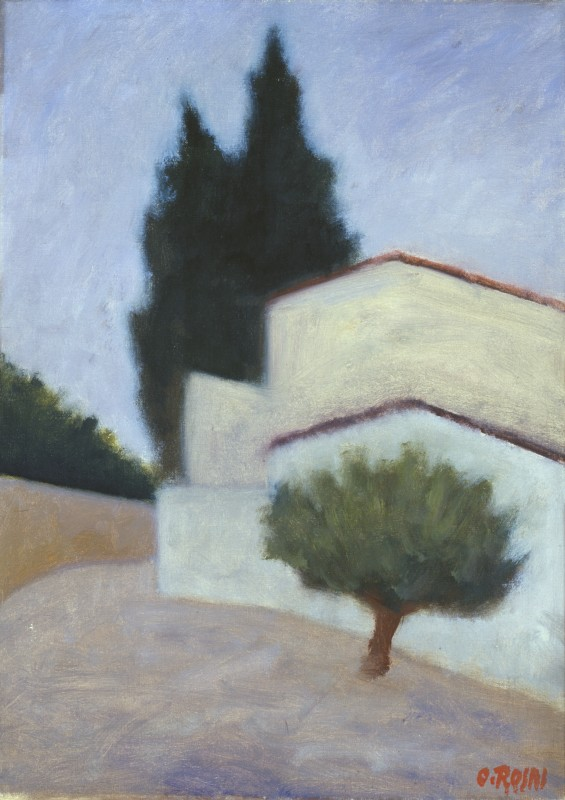
Paesaggio, 1949 (Fondazione Cariplo)

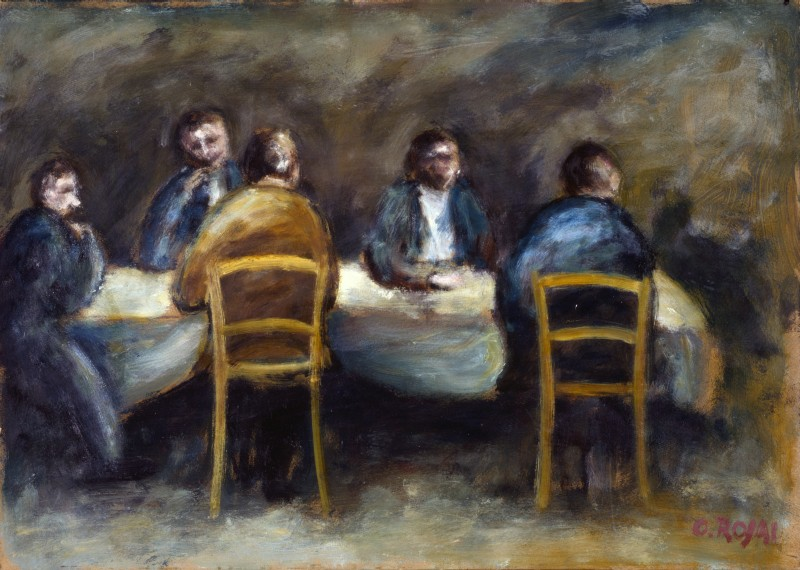
Cinque uomini al tavolo (Fondazione Cariplo)

== Other projects ==
Media related to Ottone Rosai at Wikimedia Commons

- Uzzani, Giovanna (2017). "ROSAI, Ottone". Dizionario Biografico degli Italiani (in Italian). Vol. 88: Robusti–Roverella. Rome: Istituto dell'Enciclopedia Italiana. ISBN 978-88-12-00032-6.
