= Rignano sull'Arno =

- Comune
- Comune di Rignano sull'Arno
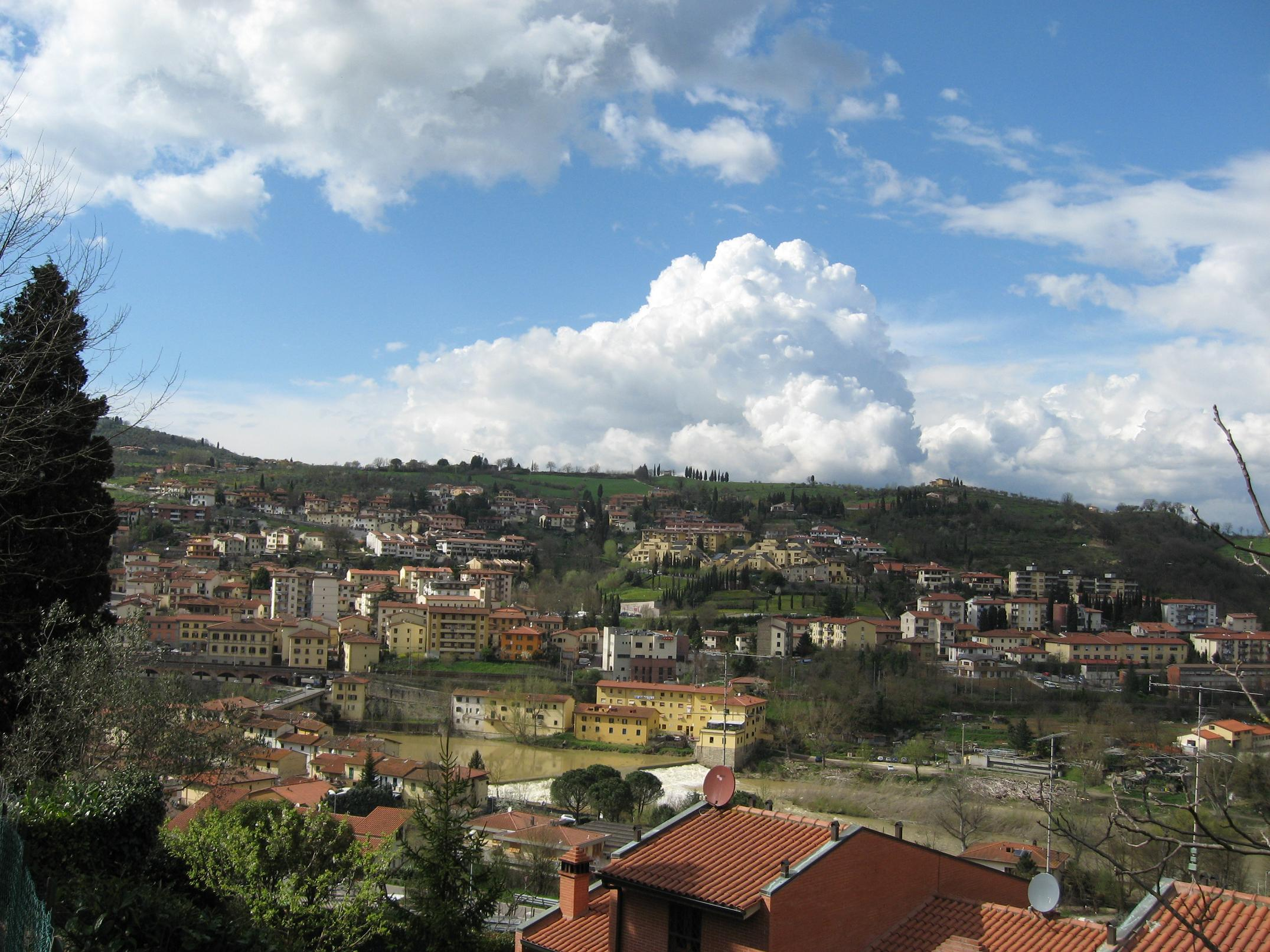

- Coat of arms

- Location within Italy Location within Tuscany
- Coordinates: 43.7237°N 11.4507°E
- Country: Italy
- Region: Tuscany
- Metropolitan city: Florence (FI)
- Frazioni: Bombone, Cellai, Le Corti, Le Valli, Pian dell'Isola, Rosano, Salceto, San Donato in Collina, San Martino, San Piero, Santa Maria, Sarnese, Torri, Troghi, Volognano

Government
  - Mayor: Daniele Lorenzini (PD)

Area
  - Total: 54.14 km^{2} (20.90 sq mi)
- Elevation: 118 m (387 ft)

Population (30 November 2016)
  - Total: 8,703
  - Density: 160.7/km^{2} (416.3/sq mi)
- Demonym: Rignanesi
- Time zone: UTC+1 (CET)
  - Summer (DST): UTC+2 (CEST)
- Postal code: 50067
- Dialing code: 055
- Patron saint: St. Leolinus
- Saint day: November 12
- Website: Official website

Rignano sull'Arno is a comune (municipality) in the Metropolitan City of Florence in the Italian region Tuscany, located about 20 kilometres (12 mi) southeast of Florence.

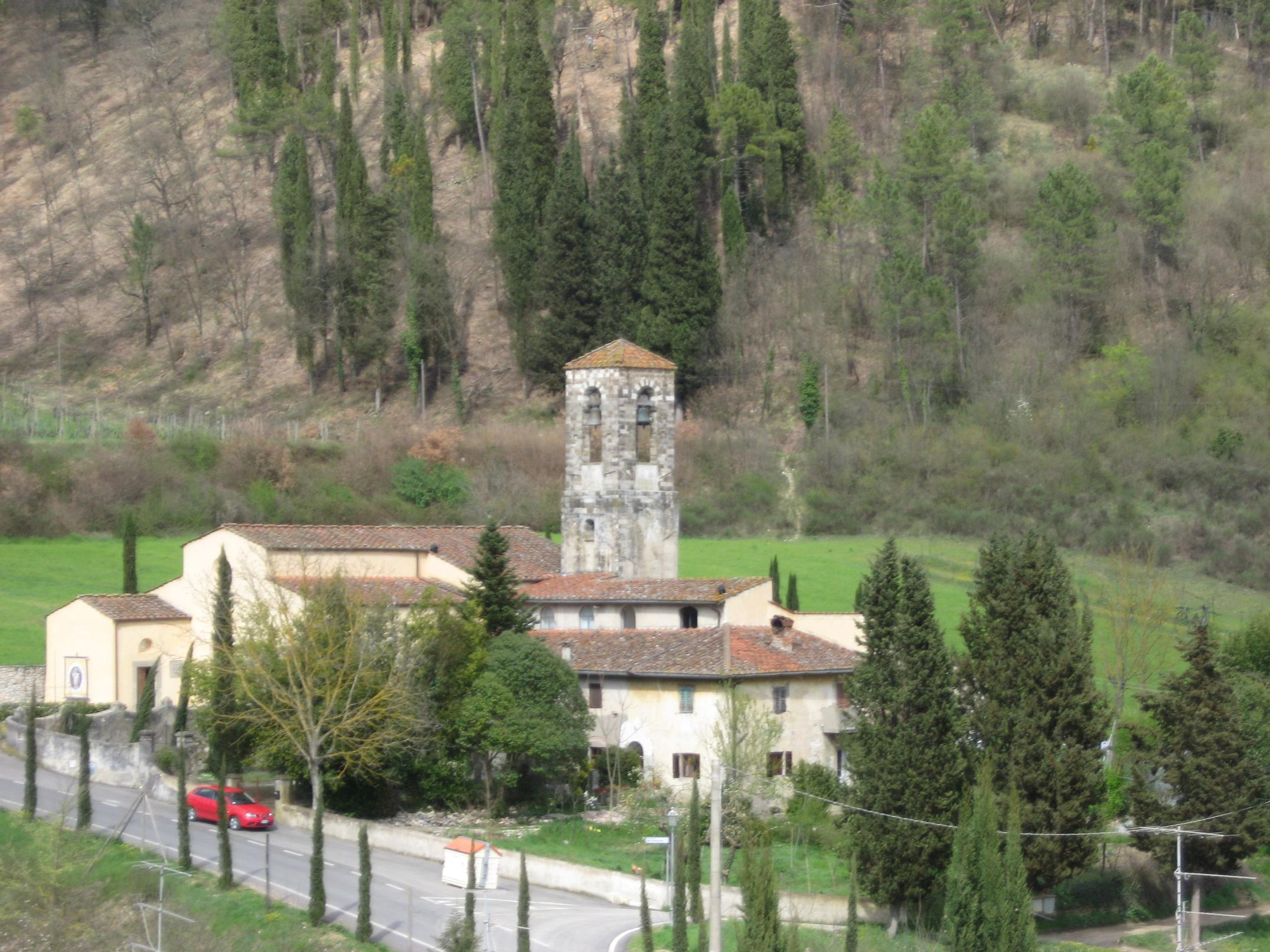
Pieve (rural church) of San Leonino

== Main sights ==
- Pieve of San Lorenzo a Miransù
- Pieve di San Leonino, with a terracotta hexagonal attributed to Santi Buglioni
- Monastery of Santa Maria a Rosano, allegedly founded in 780 but known from the 11th century. The church has kept some structures from the 12th century.
- Church of San Pietro a Perticaia. It houses a wooden crucifix of the Florentine school (late 15th-early 16th century)
- Church of San Michele in Volognano
