= Mino Maccari =

Italian painter (1898–1989)

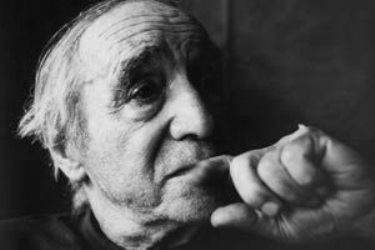
- Born: 24 November 1898; Siena, Italy
- Died: 16 June 1989 (aged 90); Rome, Italy
- Occupation: Painter

Mino Maccari (24 November 1898 – 16 June 1989) was an Italian painter. His work was part of the painting event in the art competition at the 1948 Summer Olympics. Maccari was one of the founders of the political magazine Il Selvaggio, which was launched in 1924.

== Life and career ==
Maccari was born in Siena. At the age of 19, he enlisted and fought in World War I as an artillery officer. Having returned to Siena in 1920, he graduated in law and started working at a legal practice in Colle di Val d'Elsa. During these years, he began painting and etching. In 1924, he also started working as a graphic designer for the weekly magazine Il Selvaggio (The Wild One), and published his first graphic caricatures.

Before and during World War II, Maccari worked for several other magazines as a journalist and author, and held fascist views; he had taken part to the March on Rome of 1922 that led to the taking of power by the Italian fascist movement led by Benito Mussolini. Maccari was also a set and costume designer. From 1941 to 1975, he staged nine performances in Rome, Venice, Florence, Siena, Milan, and Spoleto. After World War II, he continued to be a popular artist, and in 1962 was appointed president of the Accademia di San Luca in Rome, where he died in 1989.

In 1950, Giuochi e sports (Games and Sports), a book published in Turin, included illustrations by Maccari. The chapter "Fencing" was written by Giani Stuparich, who had won the 1948 art competitions of the Olympic Games with a gold medal in literature; the submitted drawing may have come from this book. Maccari is also the real author of a quotation that is often misattributed to Winston Churchill and Ennio Flaiano ("In Italy, fascists divide themselves into two categories: fascists and antifascists"). Flaiano himself was, in fact, attributing it to Maccari.

== See also ==
- Art competitions at the 1948 Summer Olympics
