= Enrico Falqui =

Italian writer and literary critic

Enrico Falqui (12 October 1901 – 16 March 1974) was an Italian writer and literary critic.

== Biography ==
Enrico Falqui was born in Frattamaggiore, a small market town on the northern fringes of Naples. Gaetano and Angelina Carlomagno Falqui, his parents, were originally from Sardinia. While he was still young the family relocated to Rome, where he grew up and embarked on a career as a literary critic. It becomes evident from autobiographical pieces that he was haunted by his lack of formal academic qualifications. Nevertheless, when "La Fiera Letteraria" transferred from Milan to Rome and was relaunched as "L'Italia Letteraria" in 1929, Falqui, still aged only 28, was installed as editor-in-chief under the directorship of Giovanni Battista Angioletti and Umberto Fracchia. Falqui retained this editorship till 1936. He also found time, over the years, to contribute to various other literary periodicals, including "Circoli" (of which he was at one stage co-director with Adriano Grande), "Humanitas", "Quadrivio", "Pegaso", "Pan", "Primato", "Nuova Antologia" and even "Oggi".

In 1930 Falqui teamed up with Elio Vittorini to compile the anthology "Scrittori nuovi" ("New writers"). In 1935 he entered into a productive artistic collaboration with the Tuscan author Gianna Manzini whom he had met the previous year. That year, their previous marriages having broken, they moved to Rome where they lived together till Falqui's death in 1974.

In the mid-1930s Falqui also worked with the linguistics scholar Angelico Prati to produce what amounted to a substantial "maritime lexicon", the "Dizionario di marina medievale e moderna", published in 1937 by the "Accademia d'Italia". Later, during the war which broke out in September 1939, when he was writing for the Gazzetta del Popolo (Turin newspaper) and then, after returning home to Rome in 1944, for the recently launched Risorgimento Liberale (political daily newspaper), he continued to be resolute in defending the value of twentieth century Italian literature. Then, from 1948, he enhanced his reputation with his assiduous and well-judged editorship the culture page(s) of the mass-circulation daily, "Il Tempo". He became a particular champion of the works of Dino Campana and Curzio Malaparte, discovering and promoting hitherto unpublished works of these (and other) authors.

During his time with "L'Italia Letteraria" Falqui discovered and encouraged the illustrator known as "Scipione", whose distinctive style became integral to the look of the magazine. After Scipione's death from tuberculosis, Falqui kept the artist's memory alive: their correspondence was published in 1943. Earlier, between 1929 and 1931, Falqui had a consultancy contract with the Carabba publishing house in Lanciano. He commissioned "Scipione" to design some memorable covers for books such as "Il paese del melodramma" by Bruno Barilli, "Ossi di seppia" by Eugenio Montale and "Prologhi – Viaggi – Favole" by Vincenzo Cardarelli.

Falqui created and then oversaw the book series "Il centonovelle" with the Milanese publishers Bompiani and well as the "Opera Prima" series with Garzanti and the "... nuovo filo di Arianna" series with Vallardi.

In 1945 he founded the quarterly "Poesia" which he produced from his home in Rome-Prati till publication of it ceased at the end of 1948. Despite lasting only four years, the publication is still valued due to the quality of its contributors, many of whom were, or later became, widely appreciated poets.

== Personal ==
Antonello Falqui, the son of Enrico and Alberta Falqui, was born in 1925 and later became a television producer, notably of variety shows.

Enrico Falqui died unexpectedly at Rome on 16 March 1974. His partner, Gianna Manzini, died less than half a year later.

== Celebration ==
In 1976 Falqui's papers and thousands of his books were acquired by the Central National Library in Rome, where the "Sala Falqui" (loosely, "Falqui collection") carries his name.
