= Kreutzer (surname) =

Kreutzer is a surname, and may refer to:

- Andrew L. Kreutzer (1862–1944), American politician from Wisconsin
- Bruce Kreutzer (born 1950), American basketball player and coach
- Conradin Kreutzer (1780–1849), German composer and conductor
- Daniel Kreutzer (born 1979), German ice hockey player
- Frank Kreutzer (born 1939), American baseball pitcher
- Hermann Kreutzer (1924–2007), German political activist
- Idar Kreutzer (born 1962), Norwegian businessman
- Joseph Kreutzer (1790–1840), German musician
- Léon Charles François Kreutzer (1817—1868), French composer and music critic
- Leonid Kreutzer (1884–1953), Russian pianist
- Marie Kreutzer (born 1977), Austrian film director and screenwriter
- Matthias Kreutzer (born 1982), German football coach
- Rodolphe Kreutzer (1766–1831), French violinist and composer
- Samuel Kreutzer (c.1894–1971), Australian rugby union footballer
- Volker Kreutzer, West German sprint canoer of the 1980s
- William Kreutzer, Jr. (born 1969), American soldier and murderer

== See also ==
- Kreuzer (surname)
- Kreuz (surname)
- Kreutz (surname)
