= Kreutzer =

Kreutzer may refer to:

== People ==
- Kreutzer (surname)

== Other uses ==
- Kreutzer, a synonym for Kreuzer, a silver coin and unit of currency in Southern Germany, Austria and Switzerland
- Kreutzer Air Coach, an American-built light trimotor transport aircraft of the late 1920s
- Kreutzer Etudes, a set of works for solo violin composed by Rodolphe Kreutzer around 1796

== See also ==
- Kreutz (disambiguation)
- Kreutzer Sonata (disambiguation)
- Kreuz (disambiguation)
- Kreuzer (disambiguation)
