= Kreutzer Sonata =

Kreutzer Sonata or Kreutzer's Sonata may refer to:

== Other art and media ==
- Violin Sonata No. 9 (Beethoven), Ludwig van Beethoven's 1803 sonata Op. 47, dedicated to Rodolphe Kreutzer
- Any of the sonatas composed by Rodolphe Kreutzer, the dedicatee of Beethoven's sonata
- Any of the sonatas composed by Conradin Kreutzer
- The Kreutzer Sonata, Leo Tolstoy's 1889 novella, taking its title from Beethoven's sonata
- Di Kreytser sonata (The Kreutzer Sonata), a 1902 stage adaptation of Tolstoy's novel by Jacob Gordin
- String Quartet No. 1 (Janáček), subtitled Kreutzer Sonata, Leoš Janáček's 1923 composition inspired by Tolstoy's novella
- The Kreutzer Sonata (painting), a 1901 painting by René-Xavier Prinet

== Film ==
- The Kreutzer Sonata (1911 film), a Russian silent film directed by Pyotr Chardynin
- The Kreutzer Sonata, a 1914 Russian film directed by Vladimir Gardin
- The Kreutzer Sonata (1915 film), an American silent film directed by Herbert Brenon
- The Kreutzer Sonata (1920 film), an Italian silent film directed by Umberto Fracchia
- The Kreutzer Sonata (1922 film), a German silent film directed by Rolf Petersen
- The Kreutzer Sonata (1927 film), a Czech silent film directed by Gustav Machatý
- The Kreutzer Sonata (1937 film), a German film directed by Veit Harlan
- La Sonate à Kreutzer, a 1956 French short film directed by Éric Rohmer
- The Kreutzer Sonata (1987 film), a Soviet film directed by Mikhail Shveytser
- The Kreutzer Sonata (2008 film), an American film by Bernard Rose

== See also ==
- Kreutzer (disambiguation)
