= St. Maria Angelica =

Coordinates: 52.357721°N 9.826949°E

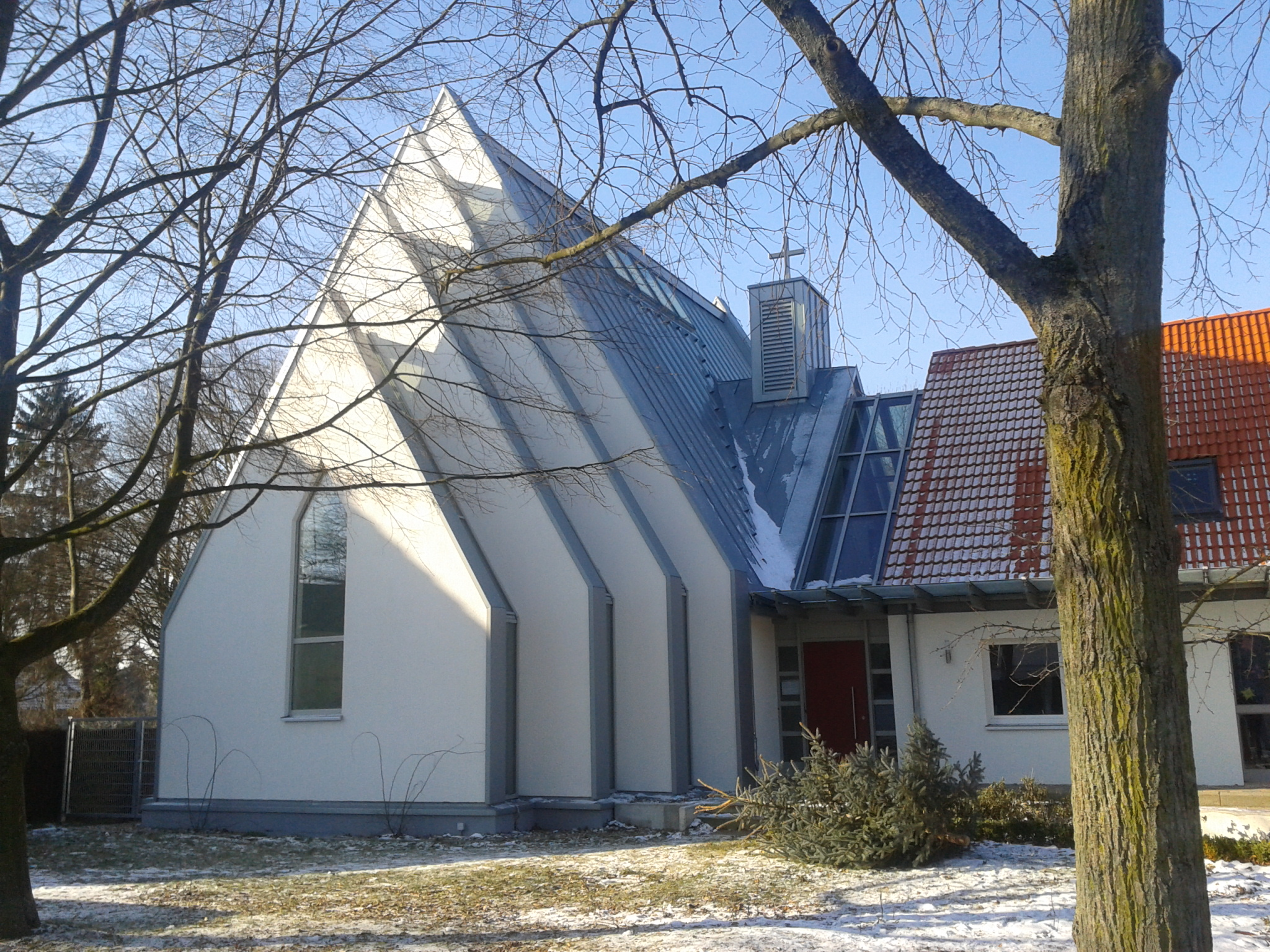
Parish church and hall

The Parish Church of St. Maria Angelica in Hanover, Germany, is the church of the Old Catholic Parish of Hanover/Southern Lower Saxony (Pfarrgemeinde Hannover/Niedersachsen-Süd). The church, which has been in use since 2010 and was consecrated on 3 September 2011, is located on a property that originally belonged to the neighbouring Lutheran parish of St. James (Jakobikirche). The land was purchased in 2003 by the Old Catholic parish.

== History ==
=== Background ===
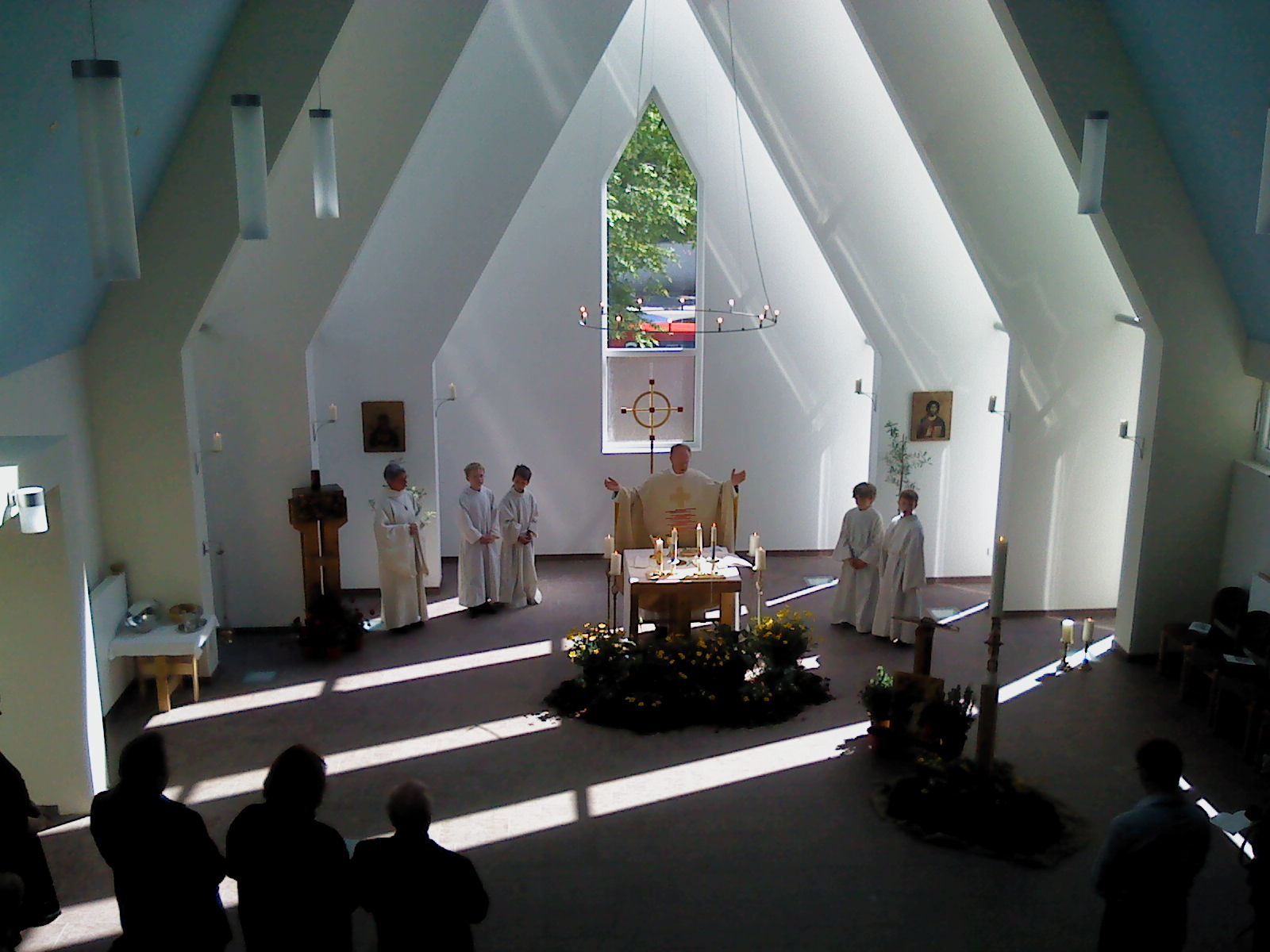
Interior during Mass

Until 2007, the parish was a guest in churches of various other parishes and denominations, then in the chapel of the Annastift hospital. Between 2007 and 2010, the parish held its services in its new parish hall. The building of the church was begun with the laying of the cornerstone on 30 August 2009; the first service held in the church was the Easter Vigil in 2010. Since then, the parish has held its regular services there. The church was designed, planned and built by the architecture firm Amberge und Schwartze Architekten GmbH. The costs for the construction, as well as for an expansion of the existing parish hall and rectory, were originally estimated at €500,000; in the end it cost roughly €1 million and was financed with the parish’s own capital, additional capital from the Catholic Diocese of the Old Catholics in Germany, donations from other parishes in the diocese, and donations from the general public.

=== Name and consecration ===
On 23 May 2011, the parish assembly discussed a patron saint for the parish and church building. A vote was taken and Angélique Arnauld was chosen as patron. The consecration and dedication took place on 3 September 2011. On 30 January 2013, the parish vestry decided the final form of the name would be St. Maria Angelica, using the Latin form of her name.

== Church building ==
=== Architecture ===
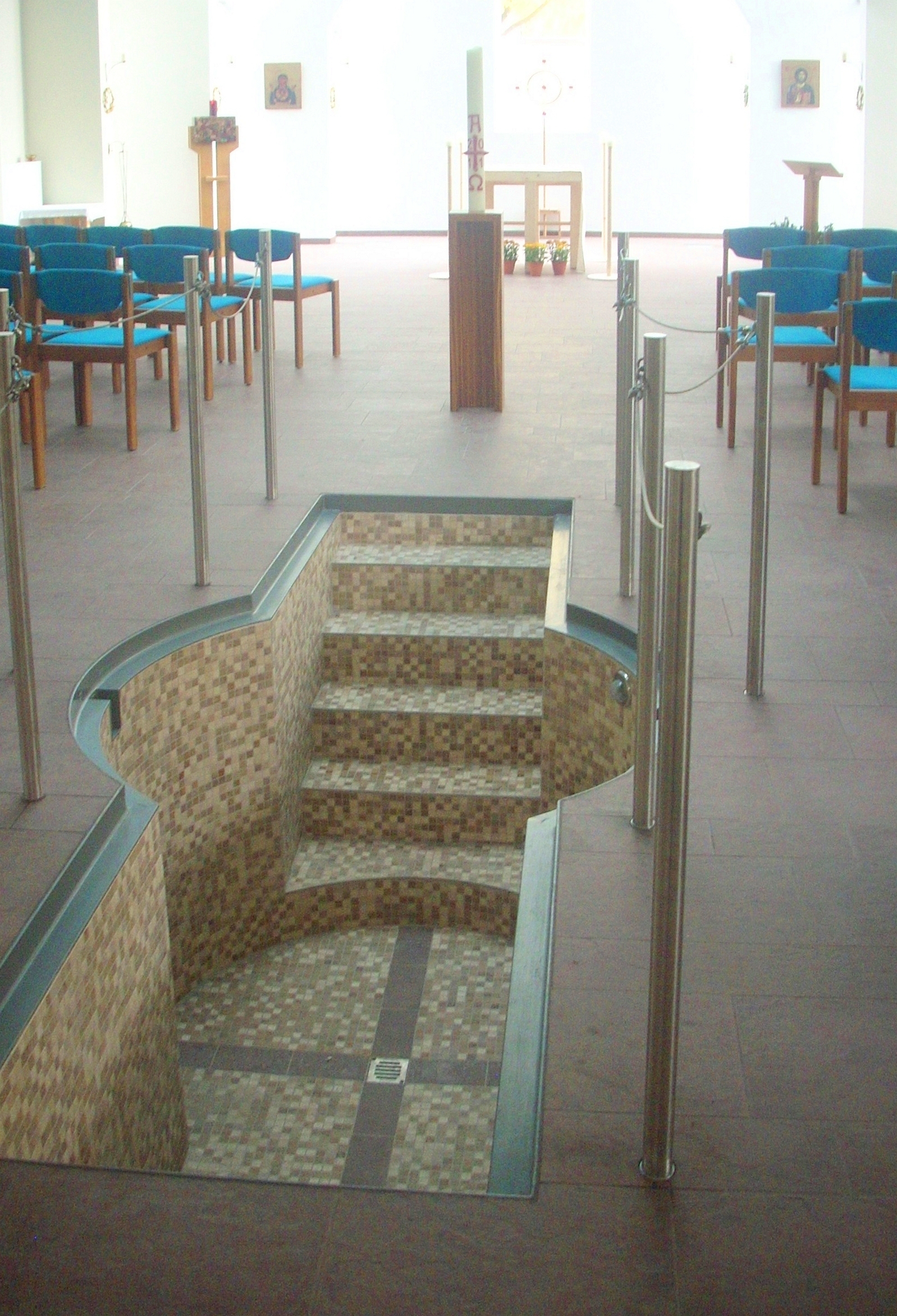
Baptismal pool

The church building is in a modern and simple design, yet is based on the traditional design of churches in western Europe. It is an aisleless or hall church in tent form. It has the first full-immersion baptismal pool in the Old Catholic diocese in Germany, situated at the west end of the church’s nave. The church, in accordance with tradition, faces the east. Because the east side of the church faces the street, the church is entered via the parish hall. The sanctuary or chancel, which faces east in the direction of the rising sun, is indirectly flooded by light from the sides. The interior is defined above all by the staggered windows in the chancel, but also by the ceiling, which is designed like an abstract starry sky, with Greek cross-shaped "stars" covered in gold leaf.

The church can hold around 100 visitors, with additional space on the choir gallery for another 20.

=== Bells ===
The church has a flèche with two bells. One of the bells, with a strike note of e2, was donated by the neighbouring Lutheran parish of St. James (Jakobikirche); the second, with a strike note of g2, was cast by order of the parish at the Glockengießerei Rudolf Perner in Passau. In May 2011, the parish had collected the necessary €7000 in donations for the second bell and for the installation of both bells in the flèche, so that it was able to place the order. On 18 November 2011, the bells were consecrated by German Old Catholic Bishop Matthias Ring. They rang for the first time during the Christmas Eve midnight Mass in 2011.

=== Altar ===
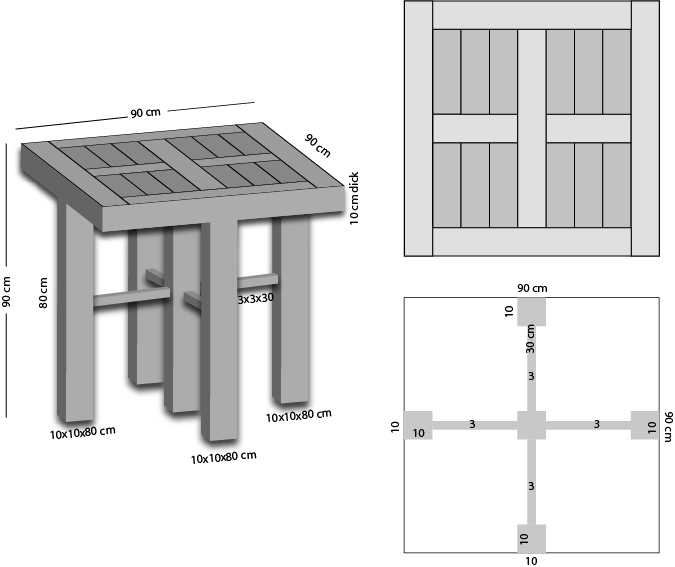
Original design of altar by John Grantham, 2005

The original version of the altar was finished in Holy Week 2005 and was used in the parish hall’s temporary chapel for celebrating the Eucharist until the church was completed. It was designed by parish vestry member John Grantham and built by him together with the parish priest, Oliver Kaiser. A second version of the altar with the same design was built for the church consecration in 2011 and was consecrated along with the church by Bishop Matthias Ring.

The altar is filled with numerological symbolism. The five legs represent the Stigmata of Jesus Christ and are arranged in the form of a Greek cross. The outer dimensions form a cube, which is the simplest representation of three dimensions, three referring to the Holy Trinity and to the unity of God. Viewed from any side, the legs and top form a tau cross or T-cross. The mensa or top of the altar is composed of four groups of three blocks of wood each: Three stands for the Trinity and thus God and Heaven, four for the Earth (the four winds, four cardinal directions, four corners of the world, etc.). Three times four – thus connecting Heaven and Earth, God and man — makes twelve, the number of the Apostles, Twelve Tribes of Israel, and twelve gates of the New Jerusalem. In the middle of the mensa, surrounding the 12 blocks, is a cross made of three blocks of wood, which in turn is surrounded by a box made of four blocks of wood forming a cross potent, for a total of seven – the number of the Messiah.
