= Kreutz =

Kreutz is a German surname, and may refer to:

== People ==
- Kreutz (surname)

== Places ==
- Kreutz Creek, a tributary of the Susquehanna River in York County, Pennsylvania
- Kreutz, the German name for the city of Križevci, Croatia
- Groß Kreutz, a municipality in Brandenburg, Germany

== Other uses ==
- 3635 Kreutz, a Mars-crossing asteroid
- Kreutz Sungrazers, a family of sungrazing comets named after Heinrich Kreutz

== See also ==
- Creutz (disambiguation)
- Kreuz (disambiguation)
- Kreuzer (disambiguation)
- Kreutzer (disambiguation)
