= Creutz =

Creutz may refer to:

== People ==
- Creutz family, a family in the Swedish and Finnish nobility
- Creutz (surname)

== Science ==
- Creutz-Taube Ion, a metal complex with the formula Ru(NH_{3})_{5}]_{2}(C_{4}H_{4}N_{2})^{5+}

== See also ==
- Kreuz (disambiguation)
- Kreutz (disambiguation)
