= Kreuz =

Kreuz is the German word for "Cross", and may refer to:

== People ==
- Kreuz (surname)

== Places ==
- Kreuz, historic German name for the town of Krzyż Wielkopolski, Poland
- Hohes Kreuz, a municipality in Thuringia, Germany
- a village in the municipality of Maitenbeth, Germany
- a village in the municipality of Preetz, Schleswig-Holstein
- a village in the municipality of Velden, Bavaria
- Krížová Ves, German: Kreuz, a village in north Slovakia

== See also ==
- Creutz (disambiguation)
- Kreutz (disambiguation)
- Kreuzberg (disambiguation)
- Kreuzer (disambiguation)
- Krüzen (disambiguation)
