= Kreuzer (surname) =

Kreuzer is a surname, and may refer to:

- Andrea Kreuzer (born 1984), Austrian figure skater
- Christoph Kreuzer (born 1982), Dutch ski jumper
- Chiara Kreuzer (born 1997), Austrian ski jumper
- Erwin Kreuzer (1878–1953), German bishop of the Old Catholic Church
- Gottfried Kreuzer, Austrian luger of the 1970s
- Hans-Ueli Kreuzer (born 1950), Swiss cross-country skier
- Heinrich Kreuzer (1819–1900), Austrian tenor singer
- Helen Tamy Kreuzer (born 1998), German golfer
- Jakob Kreuzer (born 1995), Austrian footballer
- June Kreuzer (1944–2024), American politician from Ohio
- Lisa Kreuzer (born 1945), German actress
- Martin Kreuzer (born 1962), German mathematician and chess player
- Matthew Kreuzer (born 1989), Australian rules footballer
- Niklas Kreuzer (born 1993), German footballer
- Oscar Kreuzer (1887–1968), German tennis player and rugby union footballer
- Oliver Kreuzer (born 1965), German footballer
- Victoria Kreuzer (born 1989), Swiss ski mountaineer and mountain runner

== See also ==
- Kreutzer (surname)
- Kreuz (surname)
- Kreutz (surname)
