= Creutz (surname) =

Creutz is a surname, and may refer to:

- Carl-Erik Creutz (1911–2000), Finnish radio announcer
- Carl Gustaf Creutz (1660–1728), Swedish general
- Carol Creutz (1944–2013), American chemist
- Edward Creutz (1913–2009), American physicist
- Friedrich Karl Kasimir von Creutz (1724–1770), German poet, philosopher and politician
- Gustaf Philip Creutz (1731–1785), Swedish statesman and poet
- Lorentz Creutz (1615–1676), Swedish friherre and government administrator
- Max Creutz (1876–1932), German art historian
- Michael Creutz (born 1944), American physicist
- Patricia Creutz-Vilvoye (born 1964), Belgian politician
- Rudolf Creutz (1896–1980), Austrian Nazi official and war criminal
- Edvard Sylou-Creutz (1881–1945), Norwegian classical pianist and composer

== See also ==
- Creutz family
- Kreutz (surname)
