= Meridiano di Roma =

- Categories: Literary and art magazine
- Frequency: Weekly
- Founder: Pietro Maria Bardi
- Founded: 1936
- Final issue: 1943
- Country: Italy
- Based in: Rome

Meridiano di Roma: literary, artistic and scientific Italy (Meridian of Rome) was a literary criticism, literature and art magazine existed between 1936 and 1943.

== History ==
Meridiano di Roma was founded by Pietro Maria Bardi and directed by Giovanni Battista Angioletti from January 1938. It was published in Rome every week from 1936.

The magazine, a continuation of La Fiera Letteraria, hosted articles and essays of literary criticism, literature and art, making use of the collaboration of some of the major representatives of the Italian culture of the twentieth century. It was an official magazine of the fascist regime, but of heterogeneous orientation.

Among the associates were Luciano Anceschi, Giovanni Ansaldo, Goffredo Bellonci, Emilio Cecchi, Silvio D'Amico, Julius Evola, Leonardo Sinisgalli and Giancarlo Vigorelli. It ceased publication in 1943.
