= Bishop Ring =

Bishop Ring or Bishop's Ring may refer to:

- Bishop Ring (habitat), a hypothetical rotating wheel space station
- Bishop's Ring, a type of atmospheric effect that causes a colored halo around the sun
- Bishop's ring, an ecclesiastical ring worn on the finger
- Matthias Ring (born 1963), Bishop of the Catholic Diocese of the Old Catholics in Germany from 2010
