= Lorenz-Günther Köstner =

German footballer and manager

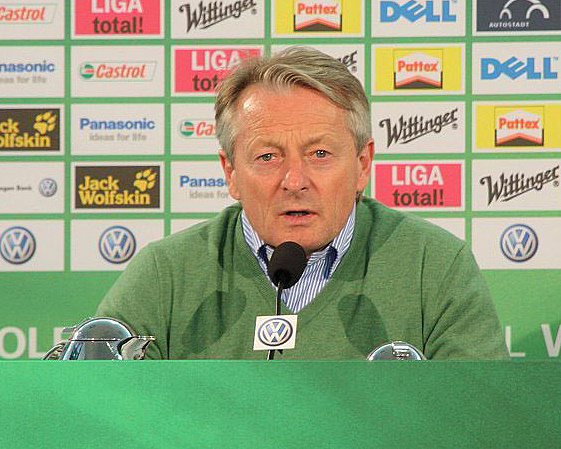
- Köstner at a press conference with Wolfsburg in 2010

Personal information
- Date of birth: 30 January 1952 (age 74)
- Place of birth: Wallenfels, West Germany
- Height: 1.77 m (5 ft 10 in)
- Position: Midfielder

Youth career
- FC Wallenfels

Senior career*
Years	Team	Apps	(Gls)
1970–1971	Bayern Hof		
1971–1973	VfB Helmbrechts		
1973–1975	Borussia Mönchengladbach	29	(3)
1975–1977	Bayer Uerdingen	50	(7)
1977–1981	Arminia Bielefeld	98	(7)

International career
1972–1975	West Germany Amateur	11	(0)

Managerial career
- 1982–1986: Bayern Hof
- 1986–1989: SSV Reutlingen
- 1989: SC Freiburg
- 1989–1991: Hessen Kassel
- 1991–1994: Stuttgarter Kickers
- 1994–1997: SpVgg Unterhaching
- 1997–1998: 1. FC Köln
- 1998–2001: SpVgg Unterhaching
- 2002–2004: Karlsruher SC
- 2005–2006: TSG Hoffenheim
- 2006–2007: Rot-Weiss Essen
- 2009–2010: VfL Wolfsburg II
- 2010: VfL Wolfsburg
- 2010–2012: VfL Wolfsburg II
- 2012–2013: VfL Wolfsburg
- 2014: Fortuna Düsseldorf
- * Club domestic league appearances and goals

Lorenz-Günther Köstner (born 30 January 1952) is a retired German footballer who is now a football manager who last managed Fortuna Düsseldorf. Following the sacking of Armin Veh on 25 January 2010, he was named interim manager of VfL Wolfsburg until 30 June 2010.

== Coaching career ==
=== Early career ===
Between July 1982 and June 1990, Köstner was head coach of Bayern Hof, Reutlingen 05, SC Freiburg, and Hessen Kassel. Then Köstner became assistant coach with VfB Stuttgart.

=== Rot-Weiss Essen ===
Köstner was head coach of Rot-Weiss Essen between November 2006 and May 2007.

=== VfL Wolfsburg ===
Köstner had three spells as head coach of VfL Wolfsburg. The first spell happened between December 2008 and January 2010, the second spell happened between July 2010 and October 2012, and the final stint happened between December 2012 and June 2013. In between the stints, Köstner was head coach on two occasions. In the first occasion, Köstner replaced Armin Veh and was named interim head coach until the end of the season on 25 January 2010. Steve McClaren eventually replace Veh as head coach. For the second stint, Köstner became interim head coach when Wolfsburg sacked Felix Magath on 25 October 2012. Dieter Hecking eventually replaced Magath. Köstner then continued in his role as the reserve team head coach until June 2013. Valérien Ismaël replaced Köstner as the reserve team head coach.

=== Fortuna Düsseldorf ===
Köstner became manager of Fortuna Düsseldorf on 30 December 2013.

== Managerial statistics ==
As of 6 July 2014

Team	From	To	Record					
Team	From	To	G	W	D	L	Win %	Ref.
Bayern Hof	1 July 1982	15 February 1986	0	0	0	0	—	
Reutlingen 05	1 October 1986	30 June 1989	0	0	0	0	—	
SC Freiburg	1 July 1989	31 August 1989	7	5	0	2	71.43	
Hessen Kassel	15 September 1989	30 June 1990	30	12	5	13	40.00	
Stuttgarter Kickers	1 July 1993	1 March 1994	22	5	6	11	22.73	
SpVgg Unterhaching	1 July 1994	1 October 1997	81	32	29	20	39.51	
1. FC Köln	1 October 1997	30 June 1998	26	8	5	13	30.77	
SpVgg Unterhaching	1 July 1998	13 September 2001	113	43	26	44	38.05	
Karlsruher SC	1 October 2002	20 December 2004	83	25	26	32	30.12	
TSG Hoffenheim	10 January 2006	24 May 2006	14	6	2	6	42.86	
Rot-Weiss Essen	18 November 2006	30 June 2007	22	6	8	8	27.27	
VfL Wolfsburg II	22 December 2008	25 January 2010	35	19	9	7	54.29	
VfL Wolfsburg	25 January 2010	11 May 2010	21	10	4	7	47.62	
VfL Wolfsburg II	11 May 2010	25 October 2012	79	42	19	18	53.16	
VfL Wolfsburg	25 October 2012	22 December 2012	11	6	2	3	54.55	
VfL Wolfsburg II	22 December 2012	30 June 2013	17	13	3	1	76.47	
Fortuna Düsseldorf	30 December 2013	12 June 2014	9	1	6	2	11.11	
Total			569	233	149	187	40.95	—
