= Catholic Diocese of the Old Catholics in Germany =

German member body of the Union of Utrecht

Catholic Diocese of Old Catholics in Germany
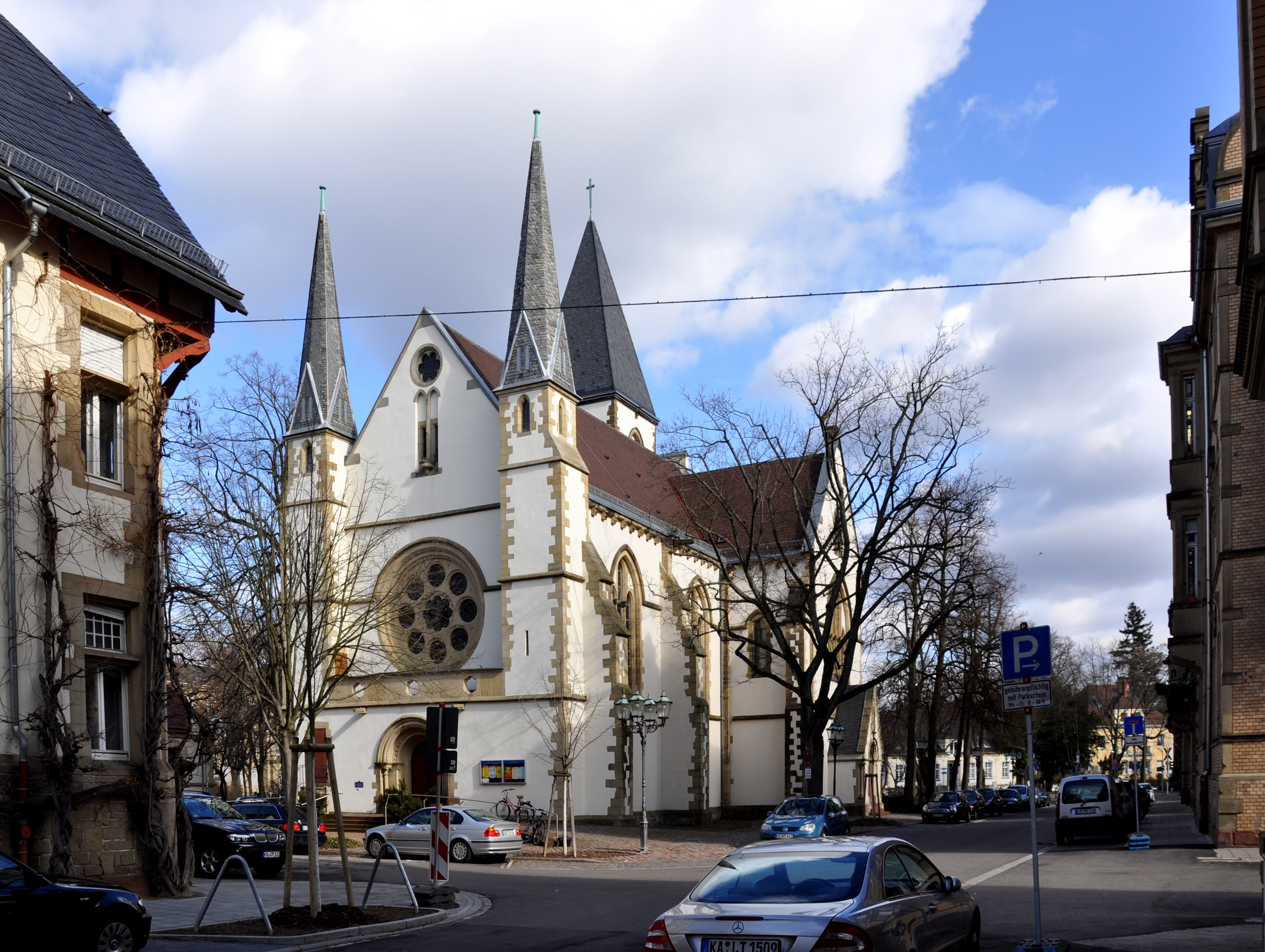
- Classification: Old Catholic
- Theology: Ultrajectine
- Governance: Episcopal
- Leader: Matthias Ring, Catholic Bishop of the Old Catholics in Germany
- Associations: International Old Catholic Bishops' Conference
- Region: Germany
- Headquarters: Bonn
- Separated from: Catholic Church
- Congregations: 55
- Members: 15,910
- Ministers: 100

The Catholic Diocese of Old Catholics in Germany (German: Katholisches Bistum der Alt-Katholiken in Deutschland) is the German member body of the Union of Utrecht of Old Catholic Churches, which follow Ultrajectine theology. It is permitted to levy the German church tax on its members. Its episcopal see is in Bonn, as is its theological faculty. Its membership is concentrated around Cologne, Bonn, the Ruhr and southern Baden. The bishop of the diocese is Matthias Ring.

== Legal status ==
In Germany, the Old Catholic Church is a Körperschaft des öffentlichen Rechts or statutory corporation and is empowered as such to levy church tax in most federal states except some in northern and eastern Germany.

== Prevalence ==
The oldest parish in Germany is on the North Frisian island of Nordstrand; its origins go back to the year 1654. It was established by Dutch Ultrajectine Catholics from the Archdiocese of Utrecht employed to build dykes.

Old Catholic parishes are most concentrated in North Rhine-Westphalia and in Baden-Württemberg. The parishes in southern Baden are very close to the parishes of the Christian Catholic Church of Switzerland, with whom they share their heritage from the reform-friendly Roman Catholic Diocese of Constance, which was dissolved in 1821. In Bavaria, Old Catholic parishes are particularly concentrated in areas where German refugees from Bohemia and Moravia settled after World War II. In Rhineland-Palatinate, Saarland, and Hesse, Old Catholics are relatively evenly distributed. In the traditionally Protestant areas of northern and eastern Germany, by contrast, parish boundaries are far larger, reflecting the diaspora situation there.

The Old Catholic bishop has his episcopal see in Bonn, which is also the location of the diocesan seminary at the University of Bonn, which has a professor’s chair of Old Catholic theology. Since 20 March 2012, Matthias Ring has been bishop. There is only one diocese, which covers the entire country. The diocese has its cathedral at the Namen-Jesu-Kirche (Church of the Holy Name of Jesus) in Bonn, which was renovated by the state and provided to the Old Catholics for their use starting 2 June 2012.

== Bishops ==
- Joseph Hubert Reinkens (1873–96), first German Old Catholic bishop, instituted liturgical and disciplinary reforms
- Theodor Weber (1896–1906)
- Josef Demmel (1906–1913)
- Georg Moog (1913–1934), first married Old Catholic bishop
- Erwin Kreuzer (1935–1953)
- Johann Josef Demmel (1953–1966)
- Josef Brinkhues (1966–1986)
- Sigisbert Kraft (1986–1995), first Old Catholic bishop to ordain a woman to the diaconate
- Joachim Vobbe (1995–2010), first Old Catholic bishop to ordain a woman to the priesthood
- Matthias Ring (2010–)
