= The Kreutzer Sonata (1920 film) =

1920 film

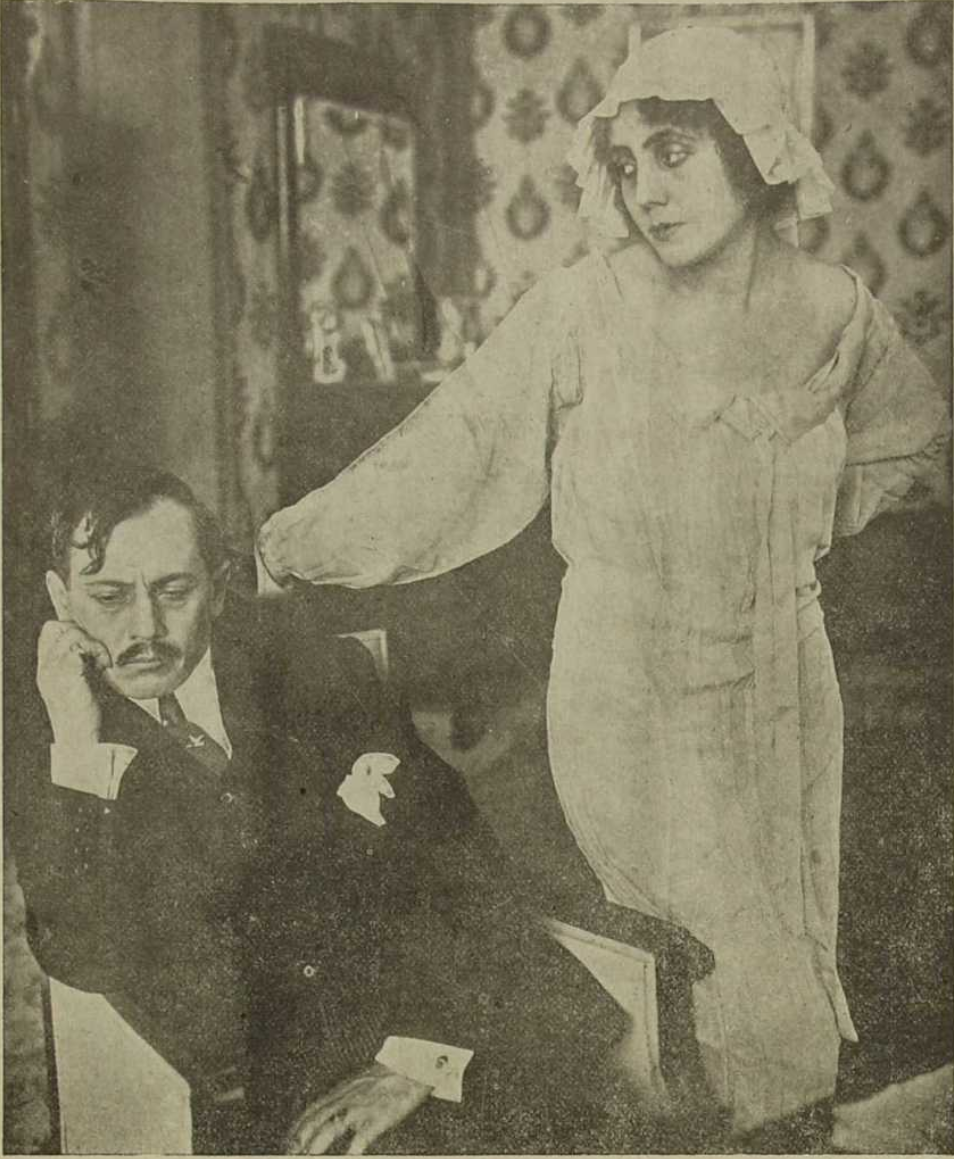
- Directed by: Umberto Fracchia
- Written by: Leo Tolstoy (story)
- Cinematography: Giovanni Merli
- Production company: Tespi Film
- Distributed by: Tespi Film
- Release date: August 1920
- Country: Italy
- Languages: Silent; Italian intertitles

The Kreutzer Sonata (Italian: La sonata a Kreutzer) is a 1920 Italian silent film directed by Umberto Fracchia. The film is based Leo Tolstoy's 1889 novella of the same name. It is also known by the alternative title A Page from Life.

== Cast ==
- Mario Mecchia
- Lina Millefleurs
- Alfredo Sainati
- Maria Tiflosi

== Bibliography ==
- Aldo Bernardini & Vittorio Martinelli. Il cinema muto italiano: I film del dopoguerra, 1920. Nuova ERI, 1995.
