= Joachim Vobbe =

German bishop

- Bishop of the Old Catholics in Germany
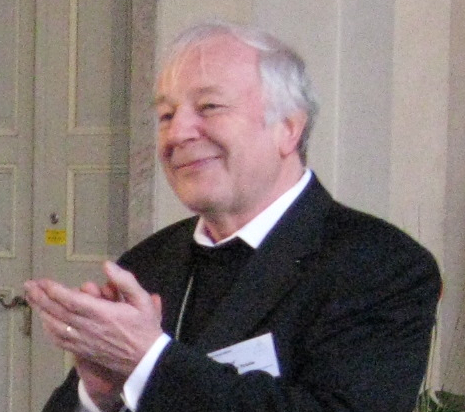
- Diocese: Catholic Diocese of the Old Catholics in Germany
- In office: 1995–2009
- Predecessor: Sigisbert Kraft
- Successor: Matthias Ring
- Other posts: Honorary assistant bishop, CofE Diocese in Europe (1995–2017)

Orders
- Ordination: 1972
- Consecration: 1995

Personal details
- Born: 5 January 1947 Bad Honnef
- Died: 26 July 2017 (aged 70) Königswinter
- Denomination: Old Catholic
- Spouse: married
- Children: Two sons

Joachim Gerhard Vobbe (5 January 1947 – 26 July 2017) was a bishop of the Catholic Diocese of the Old Catholics in Germany.

== Church career ==
Vobbe was ordained a priest on 14 June 1972; he married and has two sons. After serving as a chaplain (Kaplan) for five years in Catholic parishes in Cologne (1972–1974) and Düsseldorf (1974–1977), he joined the Old Catholic Church in 1977, becoming rector in Blumberg until 1982. He then served in Offenbach, latterly as Dean of Hesse.

In 1994, the 52nd Ordinary Diocesan Synod elected him to become their ninth diocesan bishop, succeeding Sigisbert Kraft. He was consecrated a bishop on 24 March 1995, serving as the Bishop of the Old Catholics in Germany (based in Bonn) until 2009. As bishop of a church in full communion with the Church of England, he has been licensed as an honorary assistant bishop in that church's Diocese in Europe since 1999. He died at Königswinter on 26 July 2017.
