= La Fiera Letteraria =

Italian magazine (1925–1977)

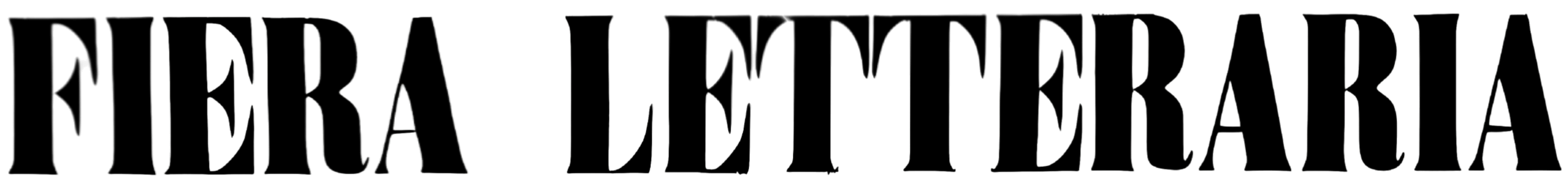
- Categories: Literary magazine
- Frequency: Weekly
- Founder: Umberto Fracchia
- Founded: 1925
- Final issue: 1977
- Country: Italy
- Based in: Milan
- Language: Italian

La Fiera Letteraria (Italian: Literary Fair) was a weekly Italian magazine of letters, sciences and arts. It was founded in 1925 with the subtitle Weekly Magazine of Letters, Sciences and Arts and was published until 1977.

== History ==
La Fiera Letteraria had over fifty years of publications history, numerous changes of directors and publisher while still maintaining the weekly frequency. Over the course of its existence, publishers and printers were more than twenty.

The magazine was founded in Milan on 13 December 1925 under the directorship of Umberto Fracchia. It was inspired by the name and methods of Frusta letteraria, the magazine founded in Venice by Giuseppe Baretti in 1763. The folio was six or eight pages, the standard for the era.

From 12 of 1928 the seat was transferred to Rome under the direction of Giovanni Battista Angioletti and Curzio Malaparte. From April 1929 the magazine took the name of La Fiera Letteraria Italia (The Literary Fair was retained as a subtitle for the rest of the year), continuing to exist until 1936, when the publications ceased for the first time. Subsequently, Curzio Malaparte founded the Meridiano di Roma (rivista), which continued its weekly publications until 1943.

In 1946, the magazine resumed the publications with the original title of La Fiera Letteraria, still under the directorship of Angioletti and with an editing team made up by Corrado Alvaro, Emilio Cecchi, Gianfranco Contini and Giuseppe Ungaretti.

In the postwar period, the magazine resumed the debate of the first series focusing on themes and issues of cultural and literary character.

In 1966 the magazine adopted the tabloid format to highlight its modernization process.

La Fiera Letteraria suspended activities for two years, from 1969 to 1970 and resumed in 1971 but due to economic difficulties and funding, ended in 1977.

== Directors ==
- Umberto Fracchia (1925 - 1928)

In 1928 the magazine was transferred to Rome

- Giovanni Battista Angioletti and Curzio Malaparte (1928 - November 1931)
- Giovanni Battista Angioletti (December 4, 1931 - July 17, 1932)
- Corrado Pavolini (July 24, 1932 - January 5, 1935)
- Armando Ghelardini (January 12 - December 1935)
- Massimo Bontempelli (January - 6 December 1936)

1937-1945: Suspension of publications

- Giovanni Battista Angioletti (1946 - 1948)
- Enrico Fulchignoni (up to No. 11 of 1948)
- Pietro Paolo Trompeo (from No. 12 of 1948)
- Vincenzo Cardarelli and Diego Fabbri (No. 6 of 1949)
- Diego Fabbri (from No. 28 of 1959, Editor-in-Chief Gino Montesanto )
- Manlio Cancogni (from No. 26 of 1967)

1969-1970: suspension of publications

- Giuseppe Giardina (from No. 1 of 1971 to 1977)
- Eraldo Miscia, Antonio Spinosa and Ferdinando Virdia co-directors (from No. 76 of 1976)
