= Kreuz (surname) =

Kreuz is a surname, and may refer to:

- Al Kreuz (1898–1975), American football player
- Arnošt Kreuz (1912–1974), Czech footballer
- Emil Kreuz (1867–1932), German musician
- Erwin Kreuz (1927–2010), West German tourist
- Manfred Kreuz (1936–2026), German footballer
- Markus Kreuz (born 1977), German footballer
- Roger J. Kreuz, American psychologist and academic
- Wilhelm Kreuz (born 1949), Austrian footballer

== See also ==
- Kreutz (surname)
- Creutz (surname)
- Kreuzer (surname)
