= Gianna Manzini =

Italian writer

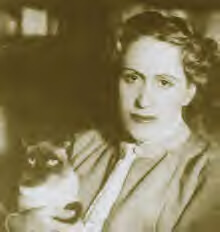
- Gianna Manzini with her cat.
- Born: 24 March 1896; Pistoia, Italy
- Died: 31 August 1974 (aged 78); Rome, Italy

Gianna Manzini (24 March 1896 – 31 August 1974) was an Italian writer whose Ritratto in piedi won her the Premio Campiello in 1971. It is a semi-autobiographical portrait of her father, an Italian anarchist. After several banishments for his political activities, her anarchist father was exiled to the small hilltop town of Cutigliano in 1921, 25 km northwest of Pistoia, where he died of a heart attack in 1925 after being chased by fascist hoodlums.

== Biography ==
Manzini was born in Pistoia. Her mother was Leonilda Mazzoncini, born 22 December 1864, in Pistoia, and her father was Giuseppe Manzini, born 7 October 1853, originally from Modena. Her childhood in Pistoia was spent in the anxious company of her mother's family who, disapproving of her anarchist father's beliefs and activities, was instrumental in causing her parents to separate. Gianna and her mother lived with her mother's two sisters, and Gianna's father lived in a rented room in Pistoia and had a clock repair shop on Via Orafo, where she would occasionally see his visiting anarchist friends. The emotional wrench of her parents' separation and her deep love for the father she idolized and later repudiated, only to return full circle as an adult, is recounted in Ritratto in piedi (Full-Length Portrait). Not only did the family drama figure large in her literary creations, but also the Tuscan landscape played a prominent role, beginning with childhood impressions of Pistoia. "[The] beautiful blue mountains encircling it from east to west, breathing that pungent perfumed air, an exhilarating delight". . . "some streets as narrow as corridors, mysterious as whispers (Via Ripa del Sale!) to stir me, open my eyes, bring out a sweet perversity, and protect me at the same time; there had been curves of well-defined activity to persuade me that I lived in a place made for me; those mountains in the background were my cape, my protection…"

=== Life in Florence ===
Manzini moved to Florence with her mother in 1916, to finish high school and attend the university, preparing to be a teacher. Manzini's love affair with the art, architecture and cultural activities of Florence is described in her next-to-last novel, Ritratto in piedi (Full-length Portrait). "The new city, Florence, embraced me as I embraced it. I savoured the happiness of being alive on that pavement, among those stones, close to the river, flung, cozied, sustained in its multiple movement. I was the ear against an enormous shell. And the city welcomed me, the accommodating and fabulous ear, to its heart. Buildings, stones, walls became horoscopes to me." She taught school for only a few months. The first chapter of her novel Tempo inamorato appeared in the Florentine newspaper, La Nazione, in 1924. This novel, published in 1928, was praised by Eugenio Montale for its "intelligence" and "rare sensitivity." With her short story "Passeggiata," published in 1929, she began her collaboration with the periodical Solaria (inaugurated in Florence in 1926 and closed down in 1936). The mission of Solaria was to bring into Italian letters the stimulus of innovative European writers such as Marcel Proust, André Gide, Virginia Woolf, and James Joyce, and Americans such as Ernest Hemingway. This "solarium" was in reaction to the prevailing canon that championed the preservation of Italian classical literary tradition, expressed by Alessandro Manzoni and Giacomo Leopardi. Notable Italian literary figures such as Montale, Elio Vittorini collaborated with Solaria. She married the literary critic of La Nazione, Bruno Fallaci, in 1930, a marriage doomed to early failure. Fallaci transferred to Milan in 1933 to write for Corriere della sera. Manzini unceasingly reveals so much of herself in her writing: her literary intentions, failings, regrets, doubts, and memories. She is imprecise or contradictory about the specifics of her life, such as when she moved from Pistoia to Florence, her father’s age, and the year she married. Some dates can be verified by letters and her diary in the Archivio di Gianna Manzini held by Arnoldo Mondadori Editore in Milan. Before the Archivio was made available scholars were often forced to make contradictory conjectures. At the moment, Gianna Manzini's documents are stored in three different places:

- the Archivio del Novecento at the Sapienza University of Rome has the majority of the letters, as part of the Archivio Manzini (Manzini Archive);
- the Fondo Manzini at the Fondazione Arnoldo e Alberto Mondadori keeps most of her preparatory manuscripts for various works;
- the Biblioteca Nazionale Centrale (Central National Library) of Rome received Manzini's own library when it acquired Falqui's books in 1978. Between the pages, diverse kinds of material (notes, letters, newspaper clippings) have been found.

The three institutions published a joint inventory in 2006.

=== Life in Rome ===
In 1934 Manzini met the literary critic Enrico Falqui. They were both married at the time, so they kept their relationship secret until spring 1935, when they both finally got separated from their previous spouses. In the meantime, they wrote to each other's every day (Manzini often wrote several times a day), while Falqui was in Rome, working at the Reale Accademia d'Italia for the new fascist regime's Italian Dictionary, and Manzini was at Villa Solaia, in the countryside near Siena, guest of her close friend Elena de Bosis Vivante (painter) and her husband Leone Vivante (philosopher).
In 1935 Manzini moved to Rome (first in Viale Giulio Cesare, then in Via Lovanio), where she lived with Falqui until his death in March 1974, preceding her death only by a few months. The move to Rome affected her personally and stylistically, as she recounts in Lettera all'editore: Game Plan for a Novel).

I left Tuscany to settle in Rome: an event precipitating great change. Time took on a different tempo—rapid, obbligato—that offended the need for creative meandering where inspiration can rely on the winds of fortune that breathe from the quiet grace of things. The hours shattered in noisy big city traffic wasted the most intimate energies in obedience to a rule that the more exteriorly exacting it was the more alien it was to my deepest needs.

The 1940s and 1950s were a time of intense literary activity. In tandem with Falqui’s Poesia, Manzini edited Prosa in 1945 and 1946, continuing her investigation of international literature. Her works appeared in such periodicals as Campo di Marte, Letteratura, Oggi, La Fiera Letteraria, Milano-Sera, and Gazzetta del Popolo. Recognition for her writing grew with literary prizes awarded for Lettera all'editore (Premio Costume 1945), Valtzer del diavolo (Premio Soroptimist 1953), La Sparviera (Viareggio Prize 1956), Un'altra cosa (Premio Marzotto 1951), Allegro con disperazione (Premio Napoli 1968), and finally her last novel, Ritratto in piedi, was awarded the Premio Campiello in 1971. Afflicted from childhood with lung weakness and a cough (the protagonist of La Sparviera), and finally dependent on oxygen, she died in Rome on 31 August 1974, five months after the death of her long-time companion.

== Style ==
From the time Manzini's first novel, Tempo innamorato, appeared, to her last prose collection, La soglia, critical curiosity was focused less on content than on her idiosyncratic writing style. Delving into the origins of her style took precedence in critical analysis, as an engaging mystery to be solved: mapping developments, analyzing influences However, no one was more analytical than she. Her father’s emphasis on clarity of writing and how it eventually affected hers is recounted in Ritratto in piedi.

== Bibliography ==
- Tempo innamorato (1928)
- Incontro col falco (1928)
- Boscovivo (1932)
- Un filo di brezza (1936)
- Rive remote (1940)
- Venti racconti (1941)
- Forte come un leone (1944)
- Lettera all' editore (1945), Game Plan for a Novel (Italica Press, 2008)
- Carta d'identità (1945)
- Il Valtzer del diavolo (1953)
- Ho visto il tuo cuore (1947)
- Animali sacri e profani (1953)
- Foglietti; All'insegna del Pesce d'oro (1954)
- La Sparviera (1956), sharing the Viareggio Prize with Carlo Levi
- Cara prigione (1958)
- Ritratti e pretesti (1960)
- Arca di Noè (1960)
- Un’altra cosa (1961)
- Il cielo addosso (1963)
- Album di ritratti (1964)
- Allegro con disperazione (1965)
- Domenikos Theotokópoulos detto El Greco (1969)
- Ritratti in piedi (1971), Full-length Portrait (Italica Press, 2011) Premio Campiello
- Sulla soglia (1973)
