= Erwin Kreuzer =

German bishop of the Old Catholic Church (1878–1953)

Erwin Kreuzer (February 24, 1878 – August 20, 1953) was fifth bishop of the Old Catholic Church in Germany. He was ordained in 1900, and served parishes in Cologne, Passau, and Kempten, as well as Freiburg im Breisgau before consecration as bishop. He was elected bishop in March, 1935 and consecrated on May 8, 1935 by Adolf Küry with the assistance of Henricus van Vlijmen and John Hermannus Berends.

In December 1935, Kreuzer took an oath of episcopal allegiance to Adolf Hitler including the following paragraphs:

"I am ready to take the obligation that shall bind me in my responsible position to particular loyalty to the commonwealth and the Führer. Not as though I felt that either the Church I represent or I myself needed binding by an oath, rather does my own heart urge me to be loyal. Yet do I welcome this hour since it gives me the opportunity of bearing my solemn witness to the fact that our Church knows itself to be intimately allied with the people. [...]

"Our Church is rooted and grounded in Christ's Gospel and in the traditional heritage of Old Catholicism. But at the same time it realizes how close is the relationship with what is to be developed and strengthened in our people by the Third Reich, namely the national commonwealth that shall embrace all members and confessions of the people. It is thus that I, as Bishop of my own Church, do not hesitate to welcome the era of the Third Reich with sincere devotion. We are specially grateful to it because it respects the individuality of our minority in point of number.

"As for myself it shall be my most earnest endeavor to uphold, cherish, and advance the obligation of national loyalty and allegiance to the State and to its Führer." (Cited in The Living Church, April 18, 1936, p. 498.)

Kreuzer was preceded by Georg Moog and succeeded by Johann Josef Demmel.
