= Krüzen =

Krüzen may refer to:

- Hendrie Krüzen (born 1964), Dutch footballer
- Krüzen, Schleswig-Holstein, a municipality in the district of Lauenburg, Schleswig-Holstein, Germany
