= Martha Kreutz =

American politician from Colorado

Martha Kreutz is a former state legislator in Colorado. She represented Arapahoe County in the Colorado House of Representatives. A Republican she served from 1993 to 1998.

Considered a moderate Republican she supports legal abortion. In the 2000 election primary she was hit with false attacks by secretive "education committees" and lost in the primary.

She was living in Littleton, Colorado in Jefferson County, Colorado.
