= Friedrich Karl Kasimir von Creutz =

German poet, philosopher and politician (1724–1770)

Friedrich Karl Kasimir von Creutz (24 November 1724 – 6 September 1770) was a German poet, philosopher, writer and politician. He was born in Bad Homburg, where he also died, and was a councillor and ally of Frederick V, Landgrave of Hesse-Homburg.

== Works ==
- Den Tod Seines Großmüthigsten Fürsten besinget Freyherr von Creuz, Fürstlich-Hessenhomburgischer würklicher Cammerjunker und Hofrath (1746)
- Oden und andere Gedichte (1750)
- Unpartheyische Untersuchung der Frage: ob ein regierender Herr, nach der Kayserlichen Wahl-Capitulation und anderen Reichs-Constitutionen, befugt sey sich selbst und aus eigener Macht bey der Landes-Hoheit, welche derselbe in eines abgetheilt- oder abgefundenen Herrns Land zu besitzen behauptet, zu schützen und sich in den Besitz, diesen aber aus dem Besitz einer ihm strittig gemachten Gerechtsame zu setzen? (1750)
- Oden und andere Gedichte (1752)
- Versuch über die Seele (1754)
- Seneca (1754)
- Die Gräber (1760)
- Versuch einer pragmatischen Geschichte von der merkwürdigen Zusammenkunft des teutschen Nationalgeistes und der politischen Kleinigkeiten Auf dem Römer in Frankfurt (1766)
- Der wahre Geist der Gesäze (1766)
- Neue Politische Kleinigkeiten (1767)
- Patriotische Beherzigung des berüchtigten Herrn und Dieners (1767)
- Die Reliquien unter moralischer Quarantaine (1767)
- Friederich Carl Casimirs von Creuz Oden und andere Gedichte (1769)

== Bibliography (in German) ==
- U. Bürgel: Die geistesgeschichtliche Stellung des Dichters Friedrich Carl Casmimir von Creutz in der Literatur der deutschen Aufklärung. Diss. Marburg 1949 (ungedruckt).
- Philipp Dieffenbach: Geschichte von Hessen mit besonderer Berücksichtigung des Grohßerzogthums S. 232.
- August von Doerr: Der Adel der böhmischen Kronländer; ein Verzeichnis derjenigen Wappenbriefe und Adelsdiplome welche in den Böhmischen Saalbüchern der Adelsarchives im k.k. Ministerium des Innern in Wien eingetragen sind. Band 212, 1900, darin: Erhebung zu: Alter Freiherrenstand für Johann Christian Würth von Mackau mit Freiherr von Creutz und Herr zu Würth, in Wien am 22. August 1727.
- Adalbert Elschenbroich: Creuz, Friedrich Karl Kasimir Freiherr von. In: Neue Deutsche Biographie 3 (1957), S. 413 f.
- Friedrich Lotz: Geschichte der Stadt Bad Homburg vor der Höhe. Band II. Kramer, Frankfurt a. M. 1964.
- Fried Lübbecke: Kleines Vaterland Homburg vor der Höhe. Kramer, Frankfurt am Main 1981. ISBN 3-7829-0254-8.
- W. Rüdiger: Von Creutz. In: Taunusbote Nr. 276/77, 1924.
- Jürgen Rainer Wolf: Landgraf Kasimir Wilhelm von Hessen-Homburg und seine vergessene Hofhaltung im Herzogtum Magdeburg. In: Aus dem Stadtarchiv. Vorträge zur Bad Hombuger Geschichte 1995/1996. Bad Homburg v.d.Höhe 1997, S. 7–27.
