= Roger J. Kreuz =

American psychologist and academic

- Occupations: Psychologist, academic, and author

Academic background
- Education: B.A., Psychology and Linguistics; M.A., Cognitive Psychology; Ph.D., Cognitive Psychology
- Alma mater: University of Toledo; Princeton University

Academic work
- Institutions: University of Memphis

Roger J. Kreuz is an American cognitive psychologist and author. He is the Feinstone Interdisciplinary Rearch Professor and an Associate Dean at the University of Memphis.

Kreuz is known for his work on pragmatics, figurative language, miscommunication, and stylometry. He is a fellow of the Psychonomic Society, the Society for Text and Discourse, and the Association for Psychological Science.

== Education ==
Kreuz earned Bachelor of Arts degrees in Psychology and in Linguistics from the University of Toledo in 1983. He went on to receive a Master of Arts in Cognitive Psychology in 1985, followed by a Ph.D. in Cognitive Psychology in 1987 from Princeton University.

== Career ==
Kreuz worked as a research associate in the Department of Psychology at Duke University from 1987 to 1988. Between 1988 and 1993, he was an assistant professor in the Department of Psychology at Memphis State University. In 1993, he was promoted to associate professor and became a full professor in 2000. He has held several administrative roles, including program director of the Master of Science in General Psychology from 2004 to 2014 and associate chair of the Department of Psychology from 2011 to 2014. Since 2014, he has worked as associate dean and director of graduate studies in the College of Arts and Sciences at the University of Memphis.

== Other works ==
In addition to his scholarly publications, Kreuz has also written about language and communication for a general audience. He has authored or co-authored seven books that have been translated into Korean, Russian, Turkish, Chinese, Japanese, and Spanish. Moreover, he has also contributed articles to The Conversation and Psychology Today.

== Awards and honors ==
- 2014 – Fellow, The Psychonomic Society
- 2020 – Fellow, The Association for Psychological Science
- 2020 – Fellow, The Society for Text and Discourse

== Books ==
- Roberts, Richard; Kreuz, Roger (2015). Becoming Fluent: How Cognitive Science Can Help Adults Learn a Foreign Language. MIT Press.
- Kreuz, Roger; Roberts, Richard (2017). Getting Through: The Pleasures and Perils of Cross-cultural Communication. MIT Press.
- Kreuz, Roger; Roberts, Richard (2019). Changing Minds: How Aging Affects Language and How Language Affects Aging. MIT Press.
- Kreuz, Roger (2020). Irony and Sarcasm. Essential Knowledge Series. MIT Press.
- Kreuz, Roger (2023). Failure to Communicate: Why We Misunderstand What We Hear, Read, and See. Prometheus Books.
- Kreuz, Roger (2023). Linguistic Fingerprints: How Language Creates and Reveals Identity. Prometheus Books.
- Kreuz, Roger (2026). Strikingly Similar: Plagiarism and Appropriation from Chaucer to Chatbots. Cambridge University Press.
