= Samuel Kreutzer =

Australian rugby union footballer (c.1894–1971)

- Born: Samuel David Kreutzer circa 1894 Brisbane, Queensland
- Died: 1 July 1971

Rugby union career
- Position: prop
International career
Years	Team	Apps	(Points)
1914–1914	Wallabies	1	(0)

Samuel David Kreutzer (c. 1894 – 1 July 1971) was a rugby union player who represented Australia.

Kreutzer, a prop, was born in Brisbane, Queensland and claimed one international rugby cap for Australia.
