= Kreuzer (disambiguation) =

The kreuzer was a German silver coin. Kreuzer may also refer to:

== People ==
- Kreuzer (surname)

== Other uses ==
- Kreuzer P Class, a type of German heavy cruiser planned in the 1930s
- Kreuzer-Pelton House, a historic house erected in 1722 in New York, New York
- The Kreuzer Cup, a controversial Australian football match involving Matthew Kreuzer

== See also ==
- Kreutzer (disambiguation)
