= Lorentz Creutz =

Swedish friherre and government administrator (1615–1676)

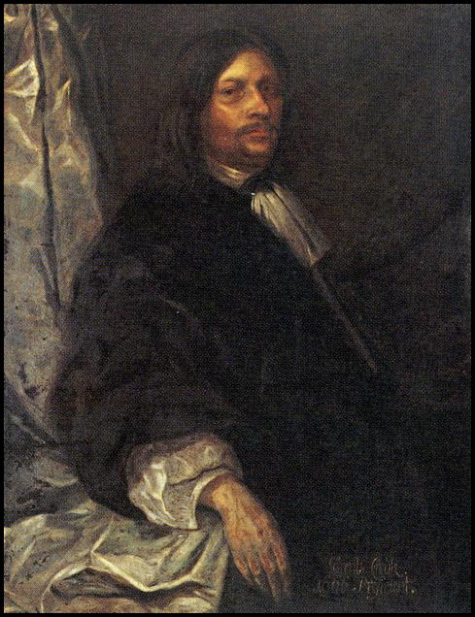
Contemporary portrait of Lorentz Creutz

Lorentz Creutz (Swedish pronunciation: [ˈlǒːrɛns ˈkrœjts]; 1615 – 1 June 1676) was a Swedish friherre (roughly equivalent to a baron), government administrator, county governor (landshövding) of Kopparberg County (1655–1662), member of the Privy Council and supreme commander of the Swedish navy for a few months in 1676.

He successfully served as an administrator in the Treasury in later years and was appointed as navy commander in early 1676 during the Scanian War. However, his complete lack of naval military experience combined with the generally poor state of the Swedish fleet led to his death on Kronan, the flagship of the navy, at the battle of Öland on 1 June 1676.

Creutz married the friherrinna (roughly baroness) Elsa Duwall (1620–1675), daughter of general Jakob MacDougall (ennobled as "Duvall") and Anna von der Berge.

== Children ==
- Lorentz Creutz the younger
- Johan Creutz
- Carl Gustaf Creutz

== Sources ==
- Svensk uppslagsbok. Malmö 1931.
- Den introducerade svenska adelns ättartavlor, Gustaf Elgenstierna

== See also ==
- Creutz family
