= Creutz family =

Swedish noble family

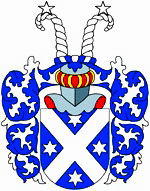
Coat of arms of the Creutz family

The Creutz family (Swedish pronunciation: [ˈkrœjts]) is a Swedish noble family with the title friherre (roughly equivalent to baron) with its roots in Swedish-governed Finland. The family, both a branch of counts and a baronial branch, continues in Finland and Sweden.

== History ==
The Creutz family is attested in sources from the late 15th century. They had their seat at the manor of Malmgård in Pernå, eastern Uusimaa, Finland. Naval commander Mårten Mattsson, lord of Sarvlaks, received a confirmation of privileges of nobility from King John III of Sweden on 2 August 1569.

When the Swedish House of Nobility was established 1625-26, the family was registered under number 92 of untitled nobility and with the name Creutz. The name imitated the Germanic trend of having actual surnames; in this case denoting a cross.

Lorentz Creutz the elder, governor of the Åbo and Borgå county, later member of the Privy Council of Sweden, admiral of the Swedish navy, lawspeaker of Northern Finland, was created friherre Creutz (baron) in 1654 by Queen Christina of Sweden on the day of her abdication. His family was registered under number 48 among baronial class. His wife was baroness Elsa Duwall, heiress of Abborfors.

Baron Johan Creutz, the Marshal of the nobility (lantmarskalk), member of the Privy Council, president of the Court of Appeals of Åbo, was created count Creutz on 31 December 1719 by queen Ulrika Eleonora of Sweden and in 1720 his family was registered under number 68 among the comital class.

His cousin, Baron Ernst Johan Creutz, was created Count but he did not register it into the Swedish House of Knights and Nobility, and upon his childless death, that comital creation became extinct.

When Finland in 1809 became an autonomous Grand Duchy, those members of the Creutz family who resided in Finland and swore fealty to the Grand Duke Emperor Alexander I, were confirmed in their noble privileges and titles as to the grand ducal estates of Finland. Accordingly, when the Finnish House of Nobility was established 1818, the comital family of Creutz was registered there under number 1 among the comital class.

== Notable members ==
- Carl Gustaf Creutz
- Carl-Erik Creutz
- Gustaf Philip Creutz – Swedish statesman, diplomat, and poet
- Johan Creutz
- Lorentz Creutz the Elder
- Lorentz Creutz the Younger

== See also ==
- The National Biography of Finland
- Swedish-speaking Finns

== Sources ==
- Lappalainen, Mirkka (2007) Släkten, Makten, Staten; Familjen Creutz i 1600-talets Sverige och Finland ISBN 978-91-1-301580-4
- Sirén, Olle (1985) Malmgård; Grevliga ätten Creutz' stamgods (Svenska Litteratursällskapet i Finland, Folklivsstudier XVII, ISSN 0085-0764) ISBN 951-9018-12-3
