= Matthias Ring =

German theologian and bishop (born 1963)

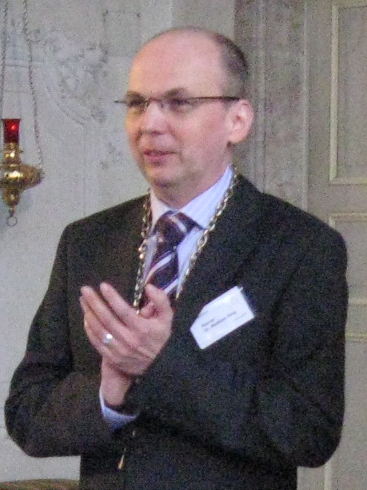
Matthias Ring, at the election of Ring to the position of Diocesan Bishop of the Old Catholic Diocese in Germany

Matthias Franz Johann Ring (born 22 February 1963 in Wallenfels, District of Kronach, Upper Franconia) is a German theologian and the Bishop of the Catholic Diocese of the Old-Catholics in Germany.

He attended elementary school in Wallenfels from 1969 to 1973 and secondary school ("Kaspar-Zeuss-Gymnasium") in the city of Kronach from 1977, from which he graduated in 1982 ("Abitur").

After graduation from secondary school he read Roman Catholic theology at the University of Würzburg and at the University of Bamberg and graduated with a diploma in 1988. After reception into the Old Catholic Church he subsequently studied at the Department for Old Catholic Theology at the University of Bonn for a further two semesters and passed the supplementary examination required for ordination on 25 October 1991.

Ring was made a deacon by Bishop Sigisbert Kraft on 13 May 1989 to serve the Old Catholic communities of Würzburg and Nürnberg. Some six months later (18 November 1989) he was ordained priest and installed as pastor of the Old Catholic parishes in Regensburg and Passau on 1 October 1993.

In order to pursue further academic studies and to earn a doctorate in theology, Ring left active parish ministry in 2001 and became a research associate at the Department of Old Catholic Theology at the University of Bonn and a graduate student at the Faculty of Old Catholic Theology at the University of Bern. Simultaneously, he served as rector of the diocesan seminary of the Old Catholic Church in Bonn. He graduated ("Dr. theol.") after finishing his dissertation titled "Catholic and German. The Old Catholic Church of Germany and National Socialism" in 2006. He had already returned as pastor to Regensburg the previous year.

Ring as served as editor of the diocesan magazine Christen heute ("Christians Today"), as president of the synod of the Bavarian parishes, and as chairman of the finance committee.

At an extraordinary diocesan synod on 7 November 2009, in Mannheim, Ring was elected to succeed Joachim Vobbe as the tenth Bishop of the Catholic Diocese of the Old Catholics in Germany; Ring was consecrated a bishop in Karlsruhe on 20 March 2010.
