= Umberto Fracchia =

Italian writer (1889–1930)

- Born: 8 April 1889; Lucca, Tuscany, Italy
- Died: 5 December 1930 (aged 41); Rome, Italy
- Education: Sapienza University of Rome
- Occupations: journalist Literary critic author
- Parents: Capitano Francesco Fracchia (father); Gemma Scerni (mother)

Umberto Fracchia (5 April 1889 – 5 December 1930) was an Italian writer.

He was intensely active professionally for slightly more than two decades, between 1908 and 1930. He began writing short stories at an early age, but built his career initially as a journalist and literary critic. During 1919/20 he broke into the movie business, directing several films in quick succession, before his professional focus returned abruptly to writing. Over the next decade, in parallel with his journalistic work, he published a succession of novels and short stories which achieved significant commercial success. He also, in 1925, launched La Fiera Letteraria, a broadly-based literary magazine which he ran successfully for a couple of years with a skeleton staff consisting principally of himself and his wife. Exhausted by the intensity of the work and the political pressure to which magazine publishers were subjected at the time, in 1928 he transferred management of the publication to Giovanni Battista Angioletti and Curzio Malaparte while, at this stage, retaining his financial interest in it. After his sudden death from heart disease at the end of 1930, Fracchia's work remained widely read in and beyond Italy for a number of years.

== Biography ==
=== Provenance and early years ===
Umberto Fracchia was born in Lucca, but neither of his parents was from Tuscany. His father, Francesco Fracchia was a cavalry officer from Piedmont, described as a reserved character, meticulous in his work. Francesco Fracchia died when the boy was just five. His mother, Gemma Scerni, came from Genoa. From her, it is reported, Fracchia inherited a "love of sweet evasion", a powerful imagination and a love of adventure, which nurtured the boys early reading. His mother encouraged his enthusiasm for Emilio Salgari's tales of action adventure and science fiction. The characters of both parents are to be discerned in Umberto Fracchia's own writings. When it comes to the spirit of place, his identified most closely with Bargone, a small village in the low hills some ten kilometers inland to the east of Sestri Levante, where his maternal grandmother, Carlotta Laborio, still had a home, and where he spent long summer holidays as a child. After he grew up, whenever the opportunity arose, it was to Bargone that he would return and, after 1927, retire.

The first part of Umberto's childhood was lived in Alessandria, an army town ever since its foundation in the twelfth century. When he was seven, after Captain Fracchia's death, he moved with his mother to Rome, where he subsequently underwent a classical schooling. It was also in Rome that he studied successfully for a degree in Jurisprudence. By that time he was already obvious, if it had not been before, that his preference was for literary studies rather than the law. In 1908, aged barely 19 and before he had concluded his university course, Fracchia published his first book, a compilation of short stories entitled "Le Vergini", followed in 1910 by the publication, again in Rome, of "La parabola sceneggiata La favola dell'innocenza" ("The parable of innocence"). There would be no more books for ten years. The predilection for literature was encouraged by student contemporaries and near contemporaries, who included Arnaldo Frateili, Giovanni Titta Rosa, Antonio Gargiulo and, slightly later Giovanni Battista Angioletti. Friends encouraged him to make good use of his literary abilities. By the time he participated at the first congress of the "Associazione Nazionalista Italiana" (ANI) he was already beginning to acquire a public profile, both on account of his books and through his regular contributions to newly the launched "Idea Nazionale", a weekly political magazine associated with the imperialism and tub-thumping nationalism that had become mainstream across Europe at the time. More remarkably, while still a student Fracchia teamed up with Arturo Onofri to create the review magazine "Lirica" which the two of them (with others) produced at Rome during 1912/13. The journal probably drew inspiration from La Voce produced in Florence between 1908 and 1916, with which it is sometimes compared. These (and other) publications launched a passionate debate for the new century among Italian intellectuals, concerned with the shifting social relationships in human society created by the breathless succession of changes under-pinned by rapid industrialisation in societies hitherto based on traditionalist agricultural economies. It was said by admirers that Lirica had "opened the windows to a different air".

=== War years ===
In July/August 1914 when the great armies of Europe marched off to war, public opinion in Italy was divided over whether to join in. The former prime minister Giovanni Giolitti opposed military involvement on the grounds that the country was totally unprepared for war. A further dilemma for the politicians was over whether to support Italy's Triple Alliance allies, or whether to repudiate the country's alliance partners (since 1882) in favour of the English and the French, whose promises behind the scenes held out the prospect of tempting territorial gains at the expense of Austria. Fracchia, in his contributions to "Idea Nazional", was unhesitating in his support for immediate military intervention by Italy. A year later, bowing to pressures that had become irresistible, Italy entered the war in the Franco-British side. Fracchia served initially as a lieutenant in an artillery regiment and later in the navy. He ended the war with the rank of an officer. After he died Fracchia was quoted as having written that the war years, despite representing lost time in terms of his literary career, were the "most beautiful years in my life". (Note: «Gli anni della guerra, — scrive egli stesso, — nonostante perduti per la letteratura, furono ì più belli della mia vita») His wartime experiences certainly addressed the appetite for adventure evident in his written work. During the war he also found time to produce "Venizeloscontro lo Stato di Atene", a two hundred page book published in 1917 and identified by one Italian commentator as a tract against Greek neutrality.

=== "L'Idea Nazionale" ===
Directly after the armistice which put an end to the fighting on 3 November 1918, Fracchia joined the staff at "L'Idea Nazionale" as a contributing editor. The switch during the war from weekly to daily publication had generated a need for more content. Colleagues at the publication brought together by editor-in-chief Luigi Federzoni at this time included several whose names would become prominent in Italy's literary-journalistic universe over the next couple of decades. One of these was Orio Vergani. Fracchia and Vergani had much in common: they now became firm friends and, where need arose, professional allies.

=== Movie director? ===
It was also towards the end of 1918 that, as part of a small group of writers and journalists including Mario Corsi, Fracchia took over responsibility for "artistic direction" at the well-regarded Rome-based "Tespi" Film production company. The movie industry was still at an experimental phase at the time, and in retrospect the level of Fracchia's achievements as a film director can at best be assessed as mediocre. He nevertheless produced, in a short time, at least four feature films: "Piccolo harem; La volete sapere la novità?" ("Small harem: would you like to know the latest" – based on his own draft), "Labella e la bestia" ("Beauty and the beast"), "Indiana" ( based on a novel by George Sand), "Sei mia!" ("Be mine"), "La studentessa di Gand" ("The [female} student from Gent"), "La sonata a Kreutzer" ("The Kreutzer sonata" – based on a short story by Tolstoy). Two of these, in particular, were picked out by critics as evidencing the limits of the director's experience in the genre, "Labella e la bestia" and "La sonata a Kreutzer". Writing in 1920 Angelo Piccioni was withering: "Here again we find ourselves in the realm of more or less pretentious and vacuous symbolism .... whichever way you look at it, this "Tespi" [film] is a disaster". (Note: "Anche qui siamo nel regno più o meno pretenzioso e vacuo del simbolo… Così è che questo lavoro della Tespi è, sotto tutti i punti di vista, un disastro" Angelo Piccioni, in Apollon, febbr. 1920). Two years later, the "Zafig" column in "in La Rivista cinematografica" was similarly underwhelmed: "It is truly deplorable, in a country so well favoured with good things, to see how many of our intellectuals have felt the need to try their hand from positions of ignorance at genres that are so alien to them, and, which is worse, shamelessly to hijack those genres hand from posirtions of ignorance at genres that are so alien to them, and, which is worse, shamelessly to hyjack those genres". (Note: "È veramente deplorevole in una terra così feconda di cose buone, vedere come molti dei nostri intellettualisti abbiano sentito il bisogno di cimentarsi così ignaramente in lavori stranieri e peggio ancora il bisogno di appropriarsene senza riguardo alcuno"..Zadig, in La Rivista cinematografica, 10 ag. 1922.)

In 1922 The "Tespi" Film production company collapsed, in the context of a wider financial crisis that had hit the Italian movie industry the previous year. Admirers insist that Fracchia's brief switch into the movie industry should not be dismissed as an eccentric and insignificant wasted interlude in an already all too brief (if stellar) career. Although the results produced on celluloid were disappointing, experience on the movie business did much to broaden and refine Fracchia's own narrative skills, while the industry benefitted from his influence in strengthening the intellectual currents and sensibilities, at the expense of the pressures for simple vulgarisation which the silent movie genre faced in Italy during the 1920s.

=== Milan ===
Fracchia's first full-length novel, "Il persuto amore" {"Lost love"} was published in 1921. Shortly after that he returned to the north, relocating from Rome to Milan. The move to Lombardy coincided with a new focus on journalism, as he began contributing to Il Secolo, a Milanese mass-circulation daily newspaper. He went on to work in directorial positions successively for the fortnightly review magazine "Comoedia" and the weekly women's magazine "Novella". The highpoint of his career as a magazine publisher came with the launch in December 1925 of La Fiera Letteraria, a literary magazine produced in Milan according to its proprietor's own vision, which consciously drew much inspiration from an earlier model, "Frusta letteraria", a literary periodical founded by Giuseppe Marc'Antonio Baretti (Joseph Baretti) and produced by him in Venice, seemingly single-handedly, between 1763 and 1765. The management of the magazine launched in 1925 seems to have been a similarly lonely job, but Fracchia succeeded in recruiting several top journalists as contributors, including Giovanni Battista Angioletti and Arnaldo Frateili who later became a co-director. The times were not propitious and after two or three years during which Fracchia struggled to preserve the magazine's independence of government interference it was renamed "L'Italia letteraria" in 1927, while production was transferred to Rome. Fracchia did not move to Rome. Nor, however, did immediately relinquish his financial interest in nor, till 1929, his directorship of Fiera Letteraria. These developments did not come out of the blue. The previous year Fracchia had presumably made himself a subject of intensified interest on the part of the authorities when in March 1927, he lined up alongside Benedetto Croce, who was already being subjected to intrusive government surveillance, to insist, in the pages of Il Baretti (and elsewhere), on the importance of culture not becoming subservient to power politics.

Between September 1927 and July 1928 Fracchia worked briefly for the Corriere della Sera, described during these months variously as the newspaper's Paris correspondent or the director of its Paris office.

In 1928, exhausted by the events of recent years, Fracchia fulfilled a longstanding ambition and settled in Bargone, his mother's family homebase which he had come to love as a child on frequent holiday visits to his grandmother. He had never lost touch with the place, and had probably already been involved in the extensive renovations applied to the old family home.

While living in semi-retirement at Bargone, Fracchia continued to make city visits to attend to his business affairs. It was while on a business trip to Rome, on the night of 5 December 1930, that Umberto Fracchia suffered a sudden heart attack and died. His wife was with him at the time. Several of his hitherto unpublished writings were published posthumously over the next few years.

=== Books ===
The 1920s also proved something of a golden decade for Umberto Fracchia as an author of novels and short stories. His second full-length novel "Angela", published in 1923 at Milan, was the most commercially successful of them all. Emilio Cecchi acknowledged "Angela" as signalling [Fracchia's] arrival among the Mondatori authors, observing that its remarkable success was confirmed by its having been translated into several languages. (Mondatori was Italy's largest publisher, known for "picking winners".) Nearly a century on, however, there is a sense among some critics that "Angela" has not aged particularly well.

Fracchia's novels and short stories are peopled by marginalised and disappointed characters, destined to plunge back into tragedy after ephemeral experiences based on illusory affections. His narrative works can be characterised as a "heartfelt elegy of strangled existences". It is hard to pin down an emerging Fracchia narrative style, but it is possible to identify a traditional attention to content which does not, however, override the qualities of a writing technique that makes few concessions to aesthetic frippery. Fracchia's writing has been variously described. Arnaldo Frateili wrote of "an unctuous yet free-flowing prose style, structured and regulated both in its larger direction and in terms of a constant rhythm of indefinable but recognisable internal harmony". (Note: "accorata elegia di esistenze strozzate" Giorgio Bàrberi Squarotti) (Note: una «prosa pastosa e fluente, regolata nelle larghe movenze come nel ritmo d'una indefinibile ma riconoscibile armonia interiore» Arnaldo Frateili)

== Evaluation ==
The diversity of his work, the brevity of his own life, and the shadow of the Fascist state under which he spent his most productive – and final – decade all make it hard to find a settled assessment of the career of Umberto Fracchia. Commentators are nevertheless virtually unanimous in recognising the moral consistency that link the man and his achievements, and the continuing fascination exercised by his own moral personality. It is also only fair to highlight the ethical dimension in his cultural journalism. His very human commitment to welcoming and encouraging young talent wherever he had the opportunity, notably during his hands-on stewardship of Fiera Letteraria during and after 1925, are striking. Paying tribute, Giuseppe Ravegnani recalled the journal as "having moved the very air, broadening the horizon of literary scholarship. It persuaded us to believe not just in the values of individuals, but in those of the collective".

== Output (selection) ==
- Le vergini (novelle), Roma, Casa editrice centrale, 1908.
- La favola dell'innocenza (parabola sceneggiata), Roma, Modes, 1910.
- Il perduto amore (romanzo), Milano, Vitagliano, 1921 (poi Mondadori, 1930).
- Angela (romanzo), Milano, Mondadori, 1923.
- Piccola gente di città (racconti), Milano, Mondadori, 1925.
- La stella del nord (romanzo), Milano, Mondadori, 1930.
- Gente e scene di campagna (raccolta di elzeviri), Milano, Mondadori, 1931.
- Fogli di diario, Milano, Mondadori, 1938.
- Favole e avventure, Milano, Mondadori, 1943.
- Romanzi e racconti (raccolta di tutte le sue prose narrative), Milano, Mondadori, 1949.
- Umberto Fracchia, i giorni e le opere, a cura di Andrea Aveto e Federica Merlanti, Firenze, Società Editrice Fiorentina, 2006, ISBN 88-6032-025-9
