= Kreutz (surname) =

Kreutz is a surname, and may refer to:

- Arthur Kreutz (1906–1991), American composer
- Bill Kreutz (born 1935), American and Filipino priest
- Caitlyn Kreutz (born 1997), Filipino soccer player
- Carolus Adrianus Johannes Kreutz (born 1954), Dutch orchidologist and taxonomist
- Cyprian Belzig von Kreutz (1777–1850), Russian Army general
- Estanislau Amadeu Kreutz (1928–2014), Brazilian Catholic bishop
- Feliks Kreutz (1844–1910), Polish geologist and educator
- Josh Kreutz (born 2003), American football player
- Heinrich Kreutz (1854–1907), German astronomer
- Ludivine Kreutz (born 1973), French professional golfer
- Martha Kreutz, American politician from Colorado
- Olin Kreutz (born 1977), American football player
- Phoebe Kreutz, American singer
- R. H. Kreutz (1895–1994), American politician from Nebraska
- Róbert Kreutz (1923–1944), Hungarian communist
- Robert E. Kreutz (1922–1996), American composer of Catholic liturgical music

== See also ==
- Kreuz (surname)
- Creutz (surname)
