= Wallenfels =

- Town
- Coat of arms

- Location of Wallenfels within Kronach district
- Interactive map of Wallenfels
- Location within Germany Location within Bavaria
- Coordinates: 50°16′03″N 11°28′24″E
- Country: Germany
- State: Bavaria
- Admin. region: Oberfranken
- District: Kronach
- Subdivisions: 5 Ortsteile

Government
  - Mayor (2020–26): Jens Korn (CSU)

Area
  - Total: 45.60 km^{2} (17.61 sq mi)
- Elevation: 382 m (1,253 ft)

Population (2025-12-31)
  - Total: 2,413
  - Density: 52.92/km^{2} (137.1/sq mi)
- Time zone: UTC+01:00 (CET)
  - Summer (DST): UTC+02:00 (CEST)
- Postal codes: 96346
- Dialling codes: 09262
- Vehicle registration: KC
- Website: www.wallenfels.de

Wallenfels is a town in the district of Kronach, in Bavaria, Germany. It is situated in the Franconian Forest, 11 km east of Kronach, and 32 km west of Hof.

== Geography ==
Wallenfels lies on the B 173, between Hof and Coburg. Neighbouring communities are Kronach, Marktrodach, Schwarzenbach am Wald, and Presseck.

== Tradition ==
The Swedish flag, which is still associated with a unique custom today, goes back to the year 1634 according to oral tradition. Numerous stories are linked to the old Swedish flag, the pride of the Wallenfels. It is said that when the Swedes invaded Wallenfels during the Thirty Years' War, the militia defended the Lower Gate. Many of them are said to have died, but a Swedish flag was captured, after which it was hidden under the Schwedenbrücke (Sweden Bridge).

== Etymology ==
There are two possible explanations for the origin of the name "Wallenfels". The simple but unlikely one is the combination of the German words “wallen” and “Fels”. Wallen is a verb which is best translated as "to undulate". The word Fels means "rock".

The version favoured by the town's mayor is that Wallenfels’ name comes from the noble family "von Waldenfels". The family owned Waldenfels castle which was located on a hill north of the town. It was destroyed in the German Peasants' War in 1525. Even until the Thirty Years War the town itself used to be called Waldenfels. The name changed into Wallenfels in the 18th century.

== Twin towns – sister cities ==
Wallenfels is twinned with:

- Bingham, England
