= Giovanni Battista Angioletti =

Italian writer and journalist

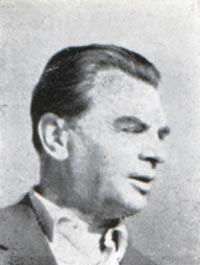
- Photograph of the Italian writer, taken in 1956.
- Born: 27 November 1896; Milan, Italy
- Died: 3 August 1961 (aged 64)
- Occupations: Writer, Journalist

Giovanni Battista Angioletti (27 November 1896 – 3 August 1961) was an Italian writer and journalist.

== Life ==
Angioletti was born in Milan in 1896 and was gifted with a lively and reflective intelligence. His plans to qualify as an engineer were interrupted by the outbreak of World War I; at the end of the conflict he decided instead to embark upon a literary career, combining work as a journalist with writing fiction. In 1928 Il giorno del giudizio became the first winner of the Premio Bagutta. In 1929 he became editor of the magazine Italia letteraria and started to write for the Corriere della Sera; in the following year he founded the literary review Trifalco.

From 1934 he spent much of his time abroad, lecturing at the universities of Dijon and Besançon and acting as director of the institutes of Italian culture in Prague and Paris. He remained in France for much of World War II, returning to Italy only in 1945.

Here he resumed his role at Italia letteraria, (now published as Fiera Letteraria) and continued to write fiction, winning the 1949 Strega Prize with La memoria, published by Bompiani. In the decade following he played a part in the birth of Italy's Radio 3 and directed a number of cultural programmes for the station.

Angioletti was for many years secretary of the Italian writers' union, the Sindacato Nazionale Scrittori Italiani, and was the first chairman of the European Community of Writers.

Giovanni Battista Angioletti died in Santa Maria la Bruna, near Naples in 1961 at the age of 64. In the previous year, his career had been crowned with the award of the Viareggio Prize for I grandi ospiti.

== Principal works ==
=== Fiction ===
- Il giorno del giudizio, Torino, 1928; Premio Bagutta
- Il buon veliero, Lanciano, 1930
- Il generale in esilio, Firenze, 1938
- Donata, Firenze, 1941
- Eclisse di luna, Firenze, 1943
- La memoria, Milano, 1949; Premio Strega
- Narciso, Milano, 1949
- Giobbe uomo solo, Milano, 1955

=== Essays and criticism ===
- Scrittori d'Europa, Milano, 1928
- Servizio di guardia, Lanciano, 1932
- L'Europa d'oggi, Lanciano, 1934
- Le carte parlanti, Firenze, 1941
- Vecchio continente, Roma, 1942
- L'Italia felice, Roma, 1947
- Inchiesta segreta, Milano, 1953
- L'anatra alla normanna, Milano, 1957
- L'uso della parola, Caltanissetta-Roma, 1958
- I grandi ospiti, Firenze 1960; Premio Viareggio
- Tutta l'Europa, Roma, 1961
- Gli italiani sono onesti, Milano, 1968; (published posthumously)

== See also ==
- List of Italian writers
