= Satellite Award for Best Actress – Miniseries or Television Film =

Award by the International Press Academy

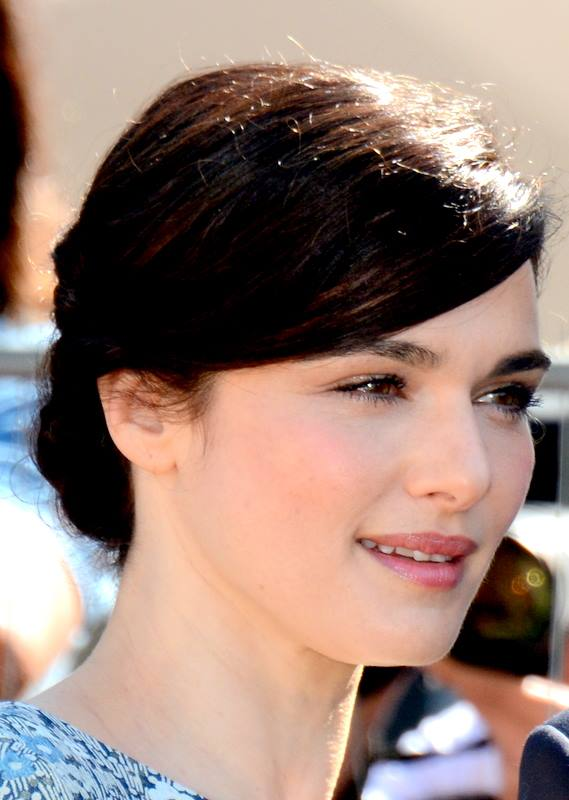
- The 2023 recipient: Rachel Weisz
- Awarded for: Best Actress in a Miniseries or Television Film
- Country: United States
- Presented by: International Press Academy
- First award: 1996
- Currently held by: Rachel Weisz – Dead Ringers (2023)

The Satellite Award for Best Actress in a Miniseries or Television Film is one of the annual Satellite Awards given by the International Press Academy.

== Winners and nominees ==
=== 1990s ===
Year	Actor	Series	Role	Network
1996	Helen Mirren	Prime Suspect 5: Errors of Judgment	DSI Jane Tennison	ITV
1996	Kirstie Alley	Suddenly	Marty Doyle	ABC
1996	Jena Malone	Hidden in America	Willa Januson	Showtime
1996	Lolita Davidovich	Harvest of Fire	Sally Russell	CBS
1996	Laura Dern	The Siege at Ruby Ridge	Vicki Weaver	CBS
1997	Jennifer Beals	The Twilight of the Golds	Suzanne Stein	Showtime
1997	Alfre Woodard	Miss Evers' Boys	Eunice Rivers Laurie	HBO
1997	Greta Scacchi	The Odyssey	Penelope	NBC
1997	Glenn Close	In the Gloaming	Janet	HBO
1997	Meryl Streep	...First Do No Harm	Lori Reimuller	ABC
1998	Angelina Jolie	Gia	Gia Carangi	HBO
1998	Olympia Dukakis	More Tales of the City	Anna Madrigal	Channel 4
1998	Mia Farrow	Miracle at Midnight	Doris Koster	ABC
1998	Barbara Hershey	The Staircase	Mother Madalyn	CBS
1998	Jennifer Jason Leigh	Thanks of a Grateful Nation	Teri Small	Showtime
1999	Linda Hamilton	The Color of Courage	Anna Sipes	USA Network
1999	Kathy Bates	Annie	Miss Agatha Hannigan	ABC
1999	Halle Berry	Introducing Dorothy Dandridge	Dorothy Dandridge	HBO
1999	Leelee Sobieski	Joan of Arc	Joan d'Arc	CBS
1999	Regina Taylor	Strange Justice	Anita Hill	Showtime

=== 2000s ===
Year	Actor	Series	Role	Network
2000	Jill Hennessy	Nuremberg	Elsie Douglas	TNT
2000	Jennifer Beals	A House Divided	Amanda Dickson	Showtime
2000	Holly Hunter	Harlan County War	Ruby Kincaid	Showtime
2000	Vanessa Redgrave	If These Walls Could Talk 2	Edith Tree	HBO
2000	Gena Rowlands	The Color of Love: Jacey's Story	Georgia Porter	CBS
2001	Judy Davis	Life with Judy Garland: Me and My Shadows	Judy Garland	ABC
2001	Laura Linney	Wild Iris	Iris Bravard	Showtime
2001	Sissy Spacek	Midwives	Sibyl Danforth	Lifetime
2001	Hannah Taylor-Gordon	Anne Frank: The Whole Story	Anne Frank	ABC
2001	Emma Thompson	Wit	Vivian Bearing	HBO
2002	Vanessa Williams	Keep the Faith, Baby	Hazel Scott	Showtime
2002	Kathy Bates	My Sister's Keeper	Christine Chapman	CBS
2002	Vanessa Redgrave	The Gathering Storm	Clementine Churchill	HBO
2002	Stockard Channing	The Matthew Shepard Story	Judy Shepard	NBC
2002	Marcia Gay Harden	King of Texas	Mrs. Susannah Lear Tumlinson	TNT
2003	Meryl Streep	Angels in America	Various Characters	HBO
2003	Felicity Huffman	Out of Order	Lorna Colm	Showtime
2003	Helen Mirren	The Roman Spring of Mrs. Stone	Karen Stone	Showtime
2003	Mary Tyler Moore	Blessings	Lydia Blessing	CBS
2003	Jessica Lange	Normal	Irma Applewood	HBO
2003	Maggie Smith	My House in Umbria	Mrs. Emily Delahunty	HBO
2004	Dianne Wiest	The Blackwater Lightship	Lily Devereux Breen	CBS
2004	Helen Mirren	Prime Suspect 6: The Last Witness	DSI Jane Tennison	ITV
2004	Clea DuVall	Helter Skelter	Linda Kasabian	CBS
2004	Angela Lansbury	The Blackwater Lightship	Dora Devereux	CBS
2004	Miranda Richardson	The Lost Prince	Queen Mary	BBC One
2005	Kristen Bell	Reefer Madness	Mary Lane	Showtime
2005	Natascha McElhone	Revelations	Sister Josepha Montafiore	NBC
2005	Geraldine McEwan	Agatha Christie's Marple	Miss Marple	ITV
2005	S. Epatha Merkerson	Lackawanna Blues	Rachel "Nanny" Crosby	HBO
2005	Cynthia Nixon	Warm Springs	Eleanor Roosevelt	HBO
2005	Keri Russell	The Magic of Ordinary Days	Livvy Dunne	CBS
2006	Judy Davis	A Little Thing Called Murder	Sante Kimes	Lifetime
2006	Annette Bening	Mrs. Harris	Jean Harris	HBO
2006	Helen Mirren	Elizabeth I	Elizabeth I	HBO
2006	Gillian Anderson	Bleak House	Lady Dedlock	BBC One
2006	Miranda Richardson	Gideon's Daughter	Stella	BBC One
2007	Samantha Morton	Longford	Myra Hindley	HBO
2007	Ellen Burstyn	For One More Day	Pauline "Posey" Benetto	ABC
2007	Queen Latifah	Life Support	Ana Wallace	HBO
2007	Debra Messing	The Starter Wife	Molly Kagan	USA Network
2007	Sharon Small	The Inspector Lynley Mysteries	DS Barbara Havers	BBC One
2007	Ruth Wilson	Jane Eyre	Jane Eyre	BBC One
2008	Judi Dench	Cranford	Matilda "Matty" Jenkyns	PBS
2008	Jacqueline Bisset	An Old Fashioned Thanksgiving	Isabella Caldwell	Hallmark Channel
2008	Laura Linney	John Adams	Abigail Adams	HBO
2008	Phylicia Rashad	A Raisin in the Sun	Lena Younger	ABC
2008	Susan Sarandon	Bernard and Doris	Doris Duke	HBO
2008	Julie Walters	Filth: The Mary Whitehouse Story	Mary Whitehouse	BBC Two
2009	Drew Barrymore	Grey Gardens	"Little" Edith Bouvier Beale	HBO
2009	Lauren Ambrose	Loving Leah	Leah Lever	CBS
2009	Judy Davis	Diamonds	Senator Joan Cameron	ABC
2009	Jessica Lange	Grey Gardens	"Big" Edith Bouvier Beale	HBO
2009	Janet McTeer	Into the Storm	Clementine Churchill	HBO
2009	Sigourney Weaver	Prayers for Bobby	Mary Griffith	Lifetime

=== 2010s ===
Year	Actor	Series	Role	Network
2010	Claire Danes	Temple Grandin	Temple Grandin	HBO
2010	Hope Davis	The Special Relationship	Hillary Clinton	HBO
2010	Judi Dench	Return to Cranford	Matilda "Matty" Jenkyns	BBC One
2010	Naomie Harris	Small Island	Hortense Roberts	BBC One
2010	Ellie Kendrick	The Diary of Anne Frank	Anne Frank	BBC One
2010	Ruth Wilson	Luther	Alice Morgan	BBC One
2010	Winona Ryder	When Love Is Not Enough: The Lois Wilson Story	Lois Wilson	CBS
2011	Kate Winslet	Mildred Pierce	Mildred Pierce	HBO
2011	Taraji P. Henson	Taken from Me: The Tiffany Rubin Story	Tiffany Rubin	LMN
2011	Diane Lane	Cinema Verite	Pat Loud	HBO
2011	Jean Marsh	Upstairs Downstairs	Rose Buck	BBC One
2011	Elizabeth McGovern	Downton Abbey	Cora Crawley, The Countess of Grantham	ITV
2011	Rachel Weisz	Page Eight	Nancy Pierpan	BBC Two
2012	Julianne Moore	Game Change	Sarah Palin	HBO
2012	Gillian Anderson	Great Expectations	Miss Havisham	BBC One
2012	Romola Garai	The Crimson Petal and the White	Sugar	BBC Two
2012	Nicole Kidman	Hemingway & Gellhorn	Martha Gellhorn	HBO
2012	Sienna Miller	The Girl	Tippi Hedren	HBO
2012	Sigourney Weaver	Political Animals	Elaine Barrish	USA Network
2013	Elisabeth Moss	Top of the Lake	Det. Robin Griffin	Sundance TV
2013	Helena Bonham Carter	Burton & Taylor	Elizabeth Taylor	BBC America
2013	Holliday Grainger	Bonnie & Clyde	Bonnie Parker	Lifetime
2013	Melissa Leo	Call Me Crazy: A Five Film	Robin	Lifetime
2013	Rebecca Hall	Parade's End	Sylvia Tietjens	HBO
2013	Helen Mirren	Phil Spector	Linda Kenney Baden	HBO
2013	Jessica Lange	American Horror Story: Coven	Fiona Goode	FX
2013	Laura Linney	The Big C: Hereafter	Cathy Jamison	Showtime
2014	Frances McDormand	Olive Kitteridge	Olive Kitteridge	HBO
2014	Maggie Gyllenhaal	The Honourable Woman	Nessa Stein, Baroness Stein of Tilbury	Sundance TV
2014	Sarah Lancashire	Happy Valley	Catherine Cawood	BBC One
2014	Cicely Tyson	The Trip to Bountiful	Carrie Watts	Lifetime
2014	Kristen Wiig	The Spoils of Babylon	Cynthia Morehouse	IFC
2015	Sarah Hay	Flesh and Bone	Claire Robbins	Starz
2015	Samantha Bond	Home Fires	Frances Barden	ITV
2015	Aunjanue Ellis	The Book of Negroes	Aminata Diallo	BET
2015	Claire Foy	Wolf Hall	Anne Boleyn	PBS
2015	Queen Latifah	Bessie	Bessie Smith	HBO
2015	Cynthia Nixon	Stockholm, Pennsylvania	Marcy Dargon	Lifetime
2016	Sarah Paulson	The People v. O. J. Simpson: American Crime Story	Marcia Clark	FX
2016	Lily James	War & Peace	Natasha Rostova	BBC One
2016	Melissa Leo	All the Way	Lady Bird Johnson	HBO
2016	Kerry Washington	Confirmation	Anita Hill	HBO
2016	Audra McDonald	Lady Day at Emerson's Bar and Grill	Billie Holiday	HBO
2016	Emily Watson	The Dresser	Her Ladyship	BBC Two
2017	Nicole Kidman	Big Little Lies	Celeste Wright	HBO
2017	Joanne Froggatt	Dark Angel	Mary Ann Cotton	ITV
2017	Michelle Pfeiffer	The Wizard of Lies	Ruth Madoff	HBO
2017	Jessica Lange	Feud: Bette and Joan	Joan Crawford	FX
2017	Susan Sarandon	Feud: Bette and Joan	Bette Davis	FX
2017	Elisabeth Moss	Top of the Lake: China Girl	Robin Griffin	Sundance TV
2018	Amy Adams	Sharp Objects	Camille Preaker	HBO
2018	Dakota Fanning	The Alienist	Sara Howard	TNT
2018	Laura Dern	The Tale	Jennifer Fox	HBO
2018	Julia Roberts	Homecoming	Heidi Bergman	Prime Video
2018	Emma Stone	Maniac	Annie Landsberg	Netflix
2019	Michelle Williams	Fosse/Verdon	Gwen Verdon	FX
2019	India Eisley	I Am the Night	Fauna Hodel	TNT
2019	Aunjanue Ellis	When They See Us	Sharonne Salaam	Netflix
2019	Niecy Nash	When They See Us	Delores Wise	Netflix
2019	Joey King	The Act	Gypsy Blanchard	Hulu
2019	Helen Mirren	Catherine the Great	Catherine the Great	HBO

=== 2020s ===
Year	Actor	Series	Role	Network
2020	Cate Blanchett	Mrs. America	Phyllis Schlafly	FX on Hulu
2020	Shira Haas	Unorthodox	Esther "Esty" Shapiro	Netflix
2020	Anya Taylor-Joy	The Queen's Gambit	Beth Harmon	Netflix
2020	Nicole Kidman	The Undoing	Grace Fraser	HBO
2020	Zendaya	Euphoria - "Trouble Don't Last Always"	Rue Bennett	HBO
2020	Letitia Wright	Small Axe	Altheia Jones-LeCointe	Prime Video
2021	Kate Winslet	Mare of Easttown	Marianne "Mare" Sheehan	HBO
2021	Danielle Brooks	Robin Roberts Presents: Mahalia	Mahalia Jackson	Lifetime
2021	Jodie Comer	Help	Sarah	Channel 4
2021	Cynthia Erivo	Genius: Aretha	Aretha Franklin	National Geographic
2021	Julianne Moore	Lisey's Story	Lisey Landon	Apple TV+
2021	Ruth Wilson	Oslo	Mona Juul	HBO
2022	Lily James	Pam & Tommy	Pamela Anderson	Hulu
2022	Jessica Biel	Candy	Candy Montgomery	Hulu
2022	Toni Collette	The Staircase	Kathleen Peterson	HBO Max
2022	Elle Fanning	The Girl from Plainville	Michelle Carter	Hulu
2022	Julia Roberts	Gaslit	Martha Mitchell	Starz
2022	Renée Zellweger	The Thing About Pam	Pam Hupp	NBC
2023	Rachel Weisz	Dead Ringers	Beverly Mantle / Elliot Mantle	Prime Video
2023	Kathryn Hahn	Tiny Beautiful Things	Clare Pierce	Hulu
2023	Brie Larson	Lessons in Chemistry	Elizabeth Zott	Apple TV+
2023	Anna Maxwell Martin	A Spy Among Friends	Lily Thomas	MGM+
2023	Juno Temple	Fargo	Dorothy "Dot" Lyon	FX
2023	Ali Wong	Beef	Amy Lau	Netflix
