= Root of Evil: The True Story of the Hodel Family and the Black Dahlia =

True crime podcast

- Language: English

Cast and voices
- Hosted by: Yvette Gentile; Rasha Pecoraro Fauna Elizabeth Hodel Peace Hodel Joy Hodel Love Hodel

Production
- Production: Zak Levitt

Publication
- No. of seasons: 1
- No. of episodes: 8
- Original release: February 13 – April 3, 2019
- Provider: Cadence13; TNT
- Updates: Weekly

Related
- Related shows: I Am the Night

The Root of Evil: The True Story of the Hodel Family and the Black Dahlia or simply, Root of Evil, is an American investigative crime podcast covering the Black Dahlia murder and suspect George Hodel. The podcast was produced as a partnership between Cadence13 and TNT as a companion to the fictional television series I Am the Night. The podcast was created by Zak Levitt, and hosted by Yvette Gentile and Rasha Pecoraro, George Hodel's great-granddaughters. It features interviews with those who were impacted by the murder, including Hodel's relatives: Fauna Elizabeth Simon, Peace Hodel, Joy Hodel, and Love Hodel. The podcast charted in the United States, United Kingdom, Australia, and Canada, reaching the number one spot in the United States on April 21, 2019.

== Background ==
In 1947, Elizabeth Short, known as the Black Dahlia, was brutally murdered. The murder remains unsolved; however, George Hodel, a surgeon, was one of the primary suspects. After George Hodel's death in 1999, his son, Steve Hodel, a former homicide detective with the Los Angeles County Police Department, desired to learn more about his father and discovered information leading him to believe that George Hodel was the killer of the Black Dahlia.

The podcast is hosted by Hodel's great-granddaughters, Yvette Gentile and Rasha Pecoraro, the daughters of Fauna Hodel. Throughout the podcast, the sisters interview their relatives, discuss 70 years of family history, and reveal the ways the family changed after the Black Dahlia case. After her death in September 2017, Fauna Hodel's daughters began to sort through the things she left behind. In the podcast, Gentile and Pecoraro analyze audio recordings between Fauna and her mother, Tamar, George's daughter. Gentile and Pecoraro also reflect upon the weight that the Hodel name carries. This is the first time that the family members have publicly spoken about their past. Gentile and Pecoraro believe that their great-grandfather did kill Elizabeth Short.

== Episodes ==
No.	Title	Running time	Original release date
1	"Saved By The Ghetto"	46:25	February 13, 2019
2	"A Skilled Surgeon"	40:16	February 20, 2019
3	"George's Gift"	43:23	February 27, 2019
4	"The Minotaur"	47:19	March 6, 2019
5	"Traumatic Reenactment"	58:07	March 13, 2019
6	"Supposin' I Did Kill The Black Dahlia"	68:56	March 20, 2019
7	"The Troubling Questions"	42:09	March 27, 2019
8	"You Only Have One Family"	46:44	April 3, 2019

== Awards and nominations ==
The podcast was nominated for "Best Crime Podcast" at the 2020 iHeartRadio Podcast Awards, but lost the award to Man in the Window.

== See also ==
- List of American crime podcasts
- George Hodel
- I Am the Night, a 2019 TNT Drama TV miniseries, featuring Jefferson Mays as George Hodel
