= John Sowden House =

Historic house in Los Angeles, California

- U.S. National Register of Historic Places
- Los Angeles Historic-Cultural Monument
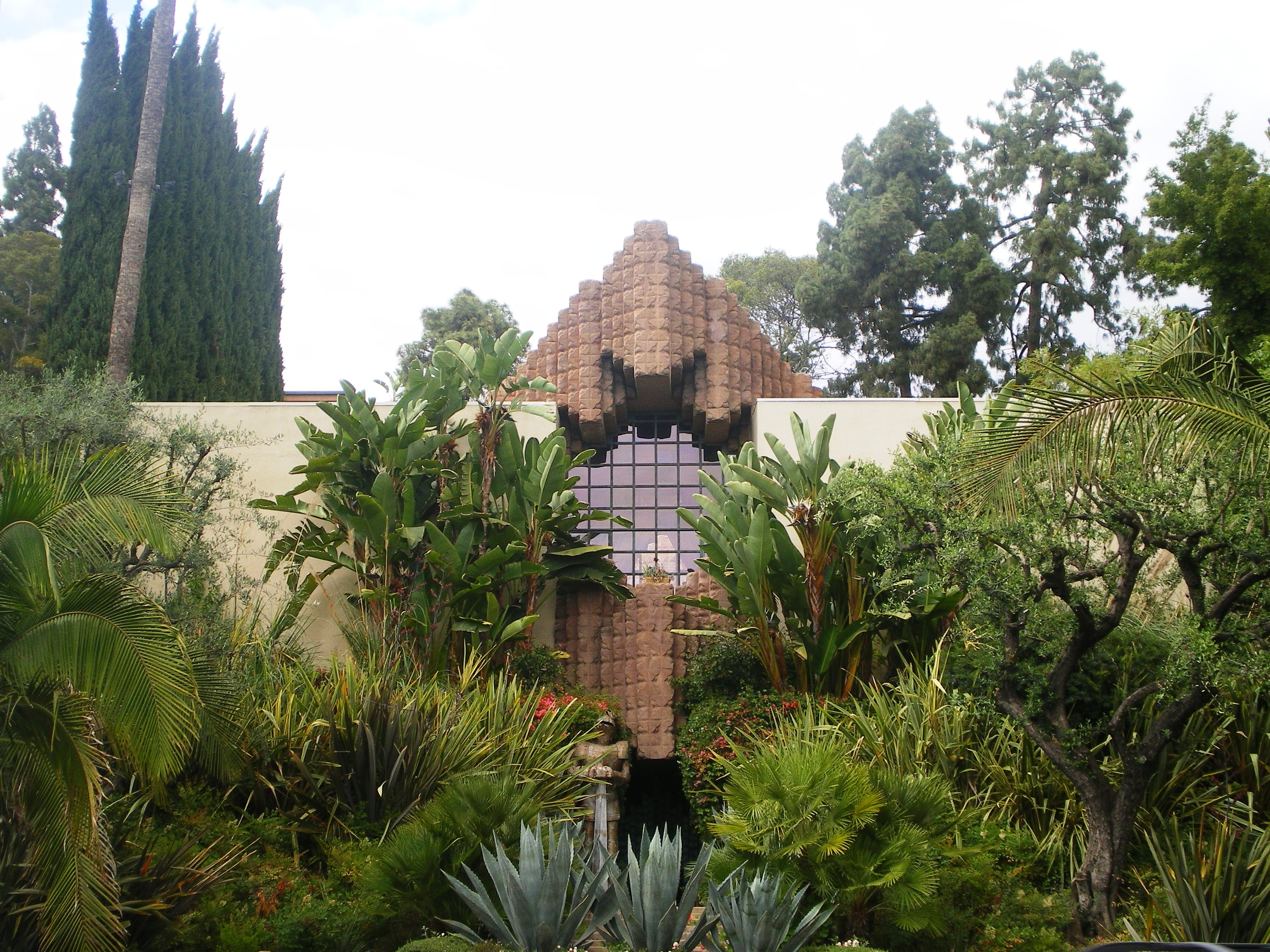
- John Sowden House, 2008
- Location: 5121 Franklin Avenue, Los Feliz, Los Angeles, California
- Coordinates: 34°6′20″N 118°18′4″W
- Built: 1926
- Architect: Lloyd Wright
- Architectural style: Mayan revival
- NRHP reference No.: 71000151
- LAHCM No.: 762

Significant dates
- Added to NRHP: July 14, 1971
- Designated LAHCM: August 13, 2003

John Sowden House, also known as the "Jaws House" or the "Franklin House", is a residence designed by Lloyd Wright and built in 1926 in the Los Feliz section of Los Angeles, California. The house is noted for its use of ornamented textile blocks and for its striking facade, resembling (depending on the viewer's points of cultural reference) either a Mayan temple or the gaping open mouth of a great white shark.

== Architecture and design ==
The original owner, John Sowden, was a painter and photographer who hired his friend, Lloyd Wright (eldest son of Frank Lloyd Wright), to build his home on Franklin Ave in Los Feliz. The house is built using concrete textile blocks and Mayan themes, with decorative block-work along some of the interior walls. Upon approaching the "cave-like" front entrance, one passes through sculpted copper gates and then up "a narrow, tomb-like staircase" into the house. The building design follows a rectangular plan, with the rooms all opening into a 22' x 68' central courtyard by way of a narrow corridor. The courtyard originally contained a 32' long pool and fountain, which was removed sometime before 1940 and two textile-block water organs which were destroyed by an earthquake in the 1930s, probably the 1933 Long Beach earthquake.

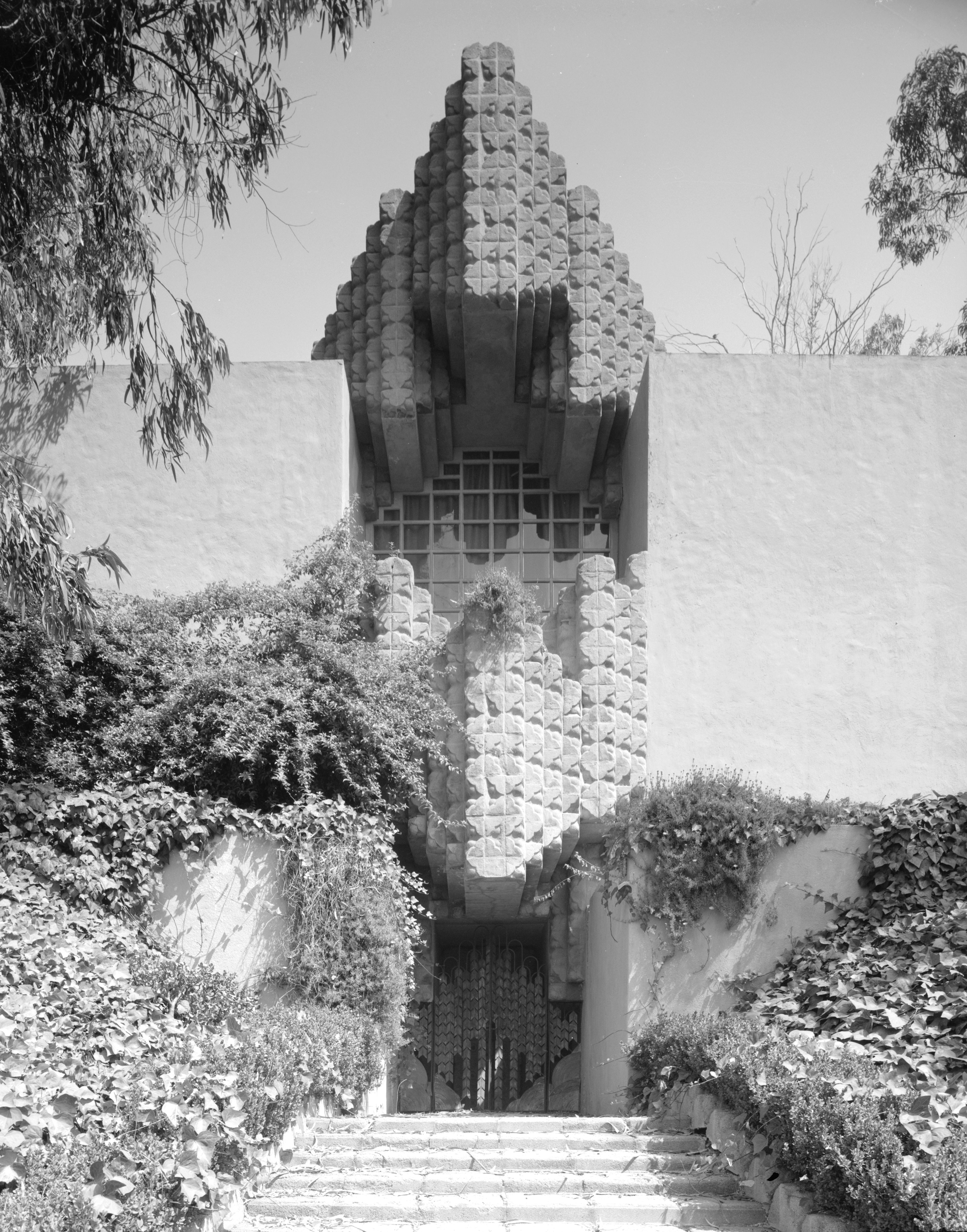
Sowden House, pictured in a 1940 Historical American Buildings Survey photograph

The building style of Sowden House is similar to Los Angeles area residences designed earlier in the 1920s by Frank Lloyd Wright, which include the Ennis House just to the northeast in the hills above Los Feliz Boulevard, the Hollyhock House in East Hollywood, the Storer House and Samuel Freeman House in the Hollywood Hills, and Millard House in Pasadena.

Contemporary reception of these Mayan revival residences was generally not positive, as critics derided the use of concrete blocks, the cheapest available material, in the construction of upscale homes. Opinions have since changed, and the houses built by the Wrights with textile blocks are now some of the most famous residential landmarks in the area, added to the U.S. National Register of Historic Places, and praised for their striking and innovative style.

Sowden House has been recognized as one of Lloyd Wright's most important works. When Lloyd Wright died in 1978, the Los Angeles Times wrote that Sowden House should be "hailed as the apogee of his residential work". The sharp ridges and lines of the facade have been said to resemble the gaping open mouth of a great white shark, resulting in the home's being known in Los Angeles as the "Jaws House". It has also been described as having a "cultic, brooding" appearance. The Los Angeles Times has additionally described it as a "quasi-Mayan-style mansion, an otherworldly apparition that looms over Franklin Avenue in Los Feliz", and "challenges the street".

This was the last residence built by the Wrights in this style, though the Mayan style roof line was also used by Lloyd Wright when he built the first "shell" for the Hollywood Bowl, constructed out of wood, which only lasted one year before being torn down.

== History ==
Sowden wanted a house that would be a showplace where he could entertain his friends in the Hollywood film community, but only lived in the house for a few years, perhaps due to the negative criticism of its architectural style at the time. The house was sold in 1930 to Ruth Rand Barnett, and again in 1936, 1944 and 1945.

From 1945 through 1950, the house was owned by Dr. George Hodel, a Los Angeles physician who was a prime suspect in the Black Dahlia murder, although he was not named publicly as such at the time. The doctor's own son, Steve Hodel, himself a retired City of Los Angeles homicide detective, argued in his 2003 book, Black Dahlia Avenger, that the Black Dahlia victim, Elizabeth Short, was actually tortured, murdered and dissected by his father in the basement of the Sowden House, in January 1947. Hodel also claims that his father may have committed further murders in the house and buried victims in the basement or yard, before fleeing the country in 1950. Despite claims that cadaver dogs have indicated the presence of human remains on the property, no excavations have been made as of October 2015.

=== In the media ===
Sowden House appeared in two separate scenes in director Curtis Hansen's classic film, L.A. Confidential (1997). The classic noir film was made just two years before the former owner, Dr. George Hill Hodel, died in his 39th-floor penthouse suite in San Francisco, California. The first interior scene shows Hollywood sex workers dancing with their "johns" in the living room. The second scene shows a late-night meeting of LAPD Sgt. Jack Vincennes (Kevin Spacey) and Captain Dudley Smith (James Cromwell) discussing their investigation in a dramatic scene filmed in the Sowden House kitchen.

Sowden House was used as a shooting location depicting the home of Ava Gardner in Martin Scorsese's film The Aviator.

It was also one of the sites used in season 6 of America's Next Top Model.

It was featured as a haunted location in a 2013 episode of Ghost Hunters, and a 2016 episode of Ghost Adventures.

Sowden House was used as a setting for the video for the song "I Dare You" by The XX.

The house was featured in the TV series I Am the Night, a mini-series about Dr. Hodel's estranged granddaughter Fauna Hodel.

== Renovation ==
The house, with seven bedrooms, four baths, and 5,600 square feet (520 m^{2}), was listed on the market at $1,575,000 in 2001. It was purchased that year by Xorin Balbes for $1.2 million. Balbes, who said the house was "a wreck" when he bought it, spent $1.6 million in restorations, though some of his alterations drew criticism from preservationists as well as Lloyd Wright's son, Eric Lloyd Wright. In addition to restoring the deteriorating stonework, Balbes converted the three-room kitchen area into a large open kitchen, added new upscale bathrooms, and installed a pool and spa in the central court. Independent filmmaker Bashar Shbib was hired to design and realize the landscaping in and around the house. On viewing the renovations, Eric Lloyd Wright praised the new kitchen and landscaping, but criticized Balbes' decision to install a pool and spa in the middle of the courtyard. All of the house's rooms open onto the long central courtyard, which was originally a lawn that was used for seating during performances at the home. Eric Wright felt it was a "mistake" to break up the courtyard space with a pool and spa. Dana Hutt, an architectural historian who has written on the works of Lloyd Wright, was also critical of Balbes' alterations. She objected to the pool, to the refinement of the entry staircase, and to the addition of Asian elements that were "completely wrong" for Wright's Mesoamerican design.

The house has been sold several times since the renovation. On September 10, 2016, it was listed for sale at $4,795,000. News came out on January 26, 2018, that it had been sold to Dan Goldfarb.

It was announced in June 2022 that the house had been sold for $6.16 million to Nate Daneshgar, of the Grand Central Market in Los Angeles.

== See also ==
- List of Registered Historic Places in Los Angeles
