= One Day She'll Darken =

2008 memoir by Fauna Hodel and J. R. Briamonte

One Day She'll Darken: The Mysterious Beginnings of Fauna Hodel
- Amazon Kindle edition cover
- Author: Fauna Hodel; J. R. Briamonte
- Language: English
- Genre: True crime
- Publisher: Graymalkin Media, Outskirts Press
- Publication date: January 29, 2008
- Publication place: United States
- ISBN: 9781631682476

One Day She'll Darken: The Mysterious Beginnings of Fauna Hodel is a memoir and true crime book by Fauna Hodel written with J. R. Briamonte. The story documents her connection to her grandfather, George Hodel, a prime suspect in the infamous Black Dahlia murder mystery. The book inspired I Am the Night, a 2019 six-episode limited television series, with the part of Fauna played by India Eisley.

== Publication history ==
The book was originally published by Outskirts Press in 2008. It was re-published in 2019 by Graymalkin Media and includes an eight-page photo insert from Hodel's personal collection.

== Overview ==
The book offers Hodel's unique perspective on adoption, race relations, and her family history. Hodel is given birth to by 16-year-old Tamar Hodel, the daughter of prominent Los Angeles doctor and socialite George Hodel. George Hodel was a prime suspect in the Black Dahlia murder mystery, giving Fauna's memoir a connection to what is frequently cited as one of the most famous unsolved murders in American history.

Fauna's birth father was unknown, and the troubled Tamar gives up Fauna for adoption. Because her father is listed on her birth certificate as "unknown Negro," Fauna ends up with an African-American family in Reno, Nevada. Told she was multiracial, Fauna is raised by Jimmie Lee Greenwade (later Faison) and given the new name "Pat." She spends her formative years during the civil rights movement, not knowing her real name or parentage.

Fauna later learns her true origins, which reveals her connection to the controversial 1949 incest trial of George Hodel, based on accusations by Tamar; as well as George Hodel's connection to the still-unsolved Black Dahlia case.

== Reviews ==
Vanity Fair contributor Cliff Rothman gave praise to Hodel's memoir, calling the book, "Haunting, poignant and heart-wrenching. The stuff of which movies are made." Phoebe Reilly, writing for The New York Times, called the book a "gripping memoir."
