= India Eisley =

American actress (born 1993)

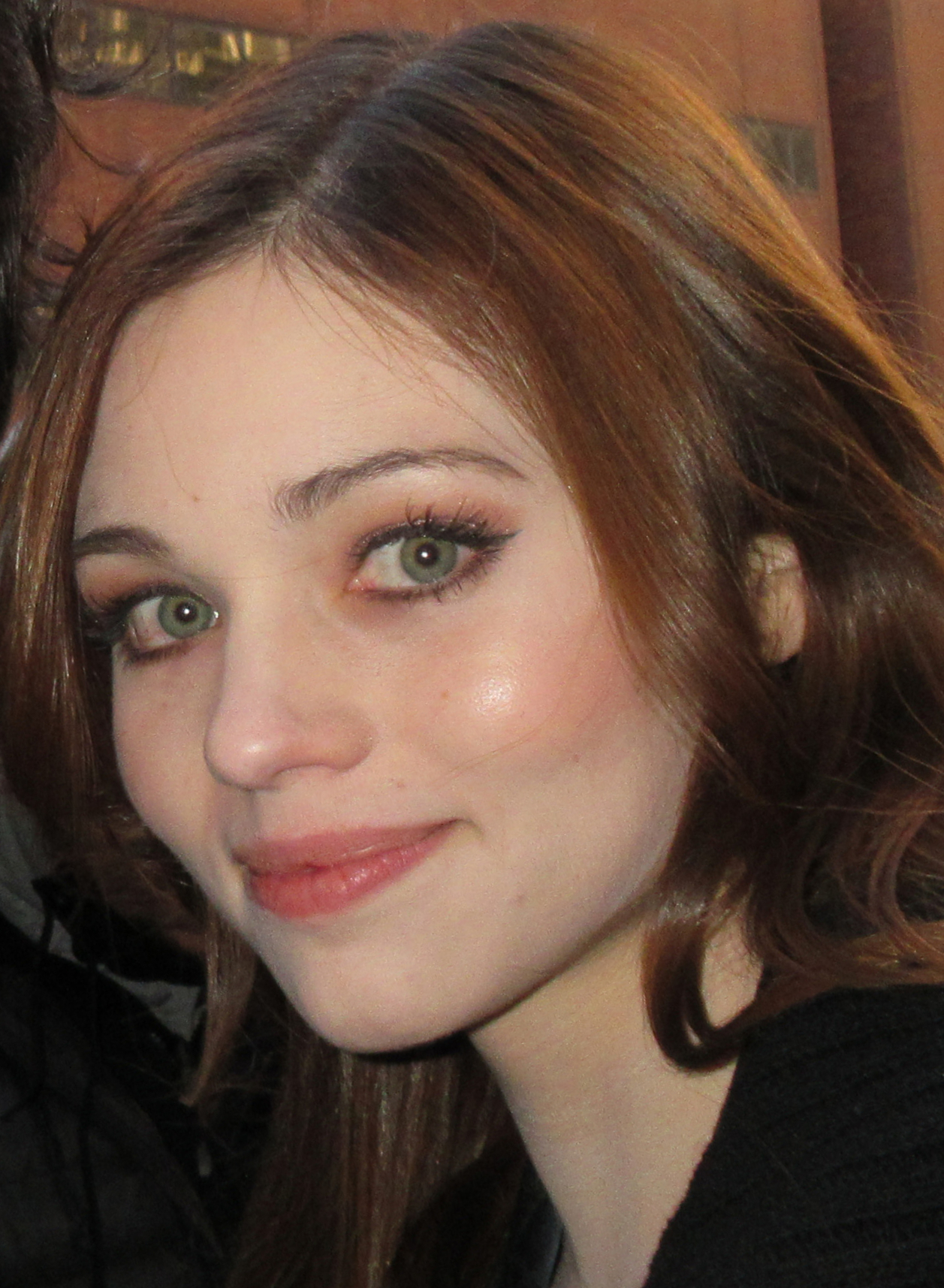
- Eisley in 2019
- Born: October 29, 1993 (age 32)
- Occupation: Actress
- Years active: 2003–present
- Partner: Henry Thomas
- Parents: David Glen Eisley (father); Olivia Hussey (mother)
- Relatives: Anthony Eisley (paternal grandfather); Osvaldo Ribó (maternal grandfather)

India Eisley (born October 29, 1993) is an American actress. On television, she is best known for her roles as Ashley Juergens in the ABC Family series The Secret Life of the American Teenager (2008–2013), Audrina in the Lifetime film My Sweet Audrina (2016), and Fauna Hodel in the TNT series I Am the Night (2019). Her films include Underworld: Awakening (2012), Kite (2014), Social Suicide (2015) and Look Away (2018).

== Early life ==
India Eisley was born on October 29, 1993, the daughter of Argentine-British actress Olivia Hussey (1951–2024) and American musician David Glen Eisley. Her paternal grandfather was American actor Anthony Eisley (1925–2003), while her maternal grandfather was Argentinian tango singer Andrés Osuna (stage name Osvaldo Ribó, 1927–2015). She has an older maternal half-brother, Alexander, whose father was American actor Dean Paul Martin (1951–1987).

== Career ==
Eisley and her mother appeared together in the 2005 movie Headspace. After small roles in various independent films, Eisley gained a major role in 2008 in The Secret Life of the American Teenager. She played Ashley Juergens, younger sister of teen mother Amy Juergens.

In the 2012 film Underworld: Awakening, Eisley was cast as Eve, the hybrid daughter of Selene and Michael Corvin; Eisley was cast due to her strong resemblance to Selene's actress, Kate Beckinsale.

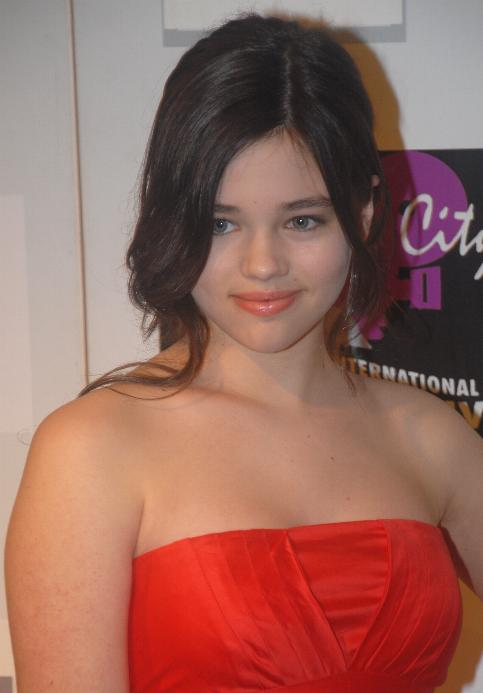
Eisley at Cinema City Film Festival in 2008

Eisley starred as Sawa in the 2014 action film Kite, opposite Samuel L. Jackson. In late 2014, she filmed Social Suicide (2015), a modern retelling of Romeo and Juliet, appearing with her real-life mother Hussey, who played Mrs. Coulson, with Eisley playing her daughter, Julia.

In 2015, Eisley starred in the horror-thriller film The Curse of Sleeping Beauty as Briar Rose. The same year, she was cast in the title role in the television film adaptation of the V. C. Andrews' book My Sweet Audrina for Lifetime, which aired in 2016. In 2017, she starred in the Netflix original film Clinical. In 2018, Eisley played the lead role of Maria / Airam in the psychological thriller film Look Away.

Author Jessica Brody expressed a desire for Eisley to portray her character Seraphina in the film adaptation of her novel Unremembered. Hollywood casting director Michelle Levy was first to recommend Eisley for the role.

In 2019, Eisley starred as Fauna Hodel in the six-part limited series I Am the Night, which is based on Hodel's memoir, One Day She'll Darken. The series premiered on January 27, 2019, on TNT. In 2020, she played Tillie Gardner in the film Dead Reckoning. In 2021, she played Lucy in the film Every Breath You Take.

== Personal life ==
Eisley enjoys cooking. As of February 2025, Eisley is dating actor Henry Thomas.

== Filmography ==
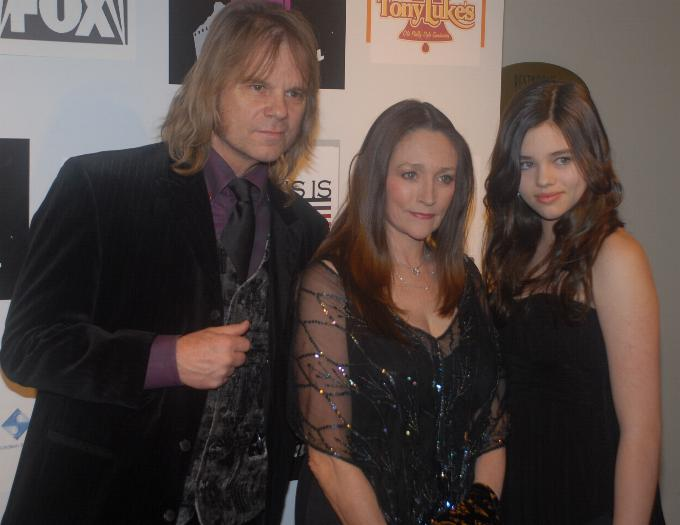
David Glen Eisley, Olivia Hussey and Eisley in 2008

=== Film ===
Year	Title	Role	Notes
2005	Headspace	Martha	
2012	Underworld: Awakening	Eve	
2014	Kite	Sawa	
2015	Social Suicide	Julia Coulson	
2016	The Curse of Sleeping Beauty	Briar Rose / The Sleeping Beauty	
2016	Amerigeddon	Penny	
2016	Underworld: Blood Wars	Eve	Archival footage
2017	Clinical	Nora Green	
2018	Adolescence	Alice Krauser	
2018	Look Away	Maria Brennan / Airam	
2020	Dead Reckoning	Tillie Gardner	
2021	Every Breath You Take	Lucy Watson	
2023	American Outlaws	Lee-Grace Dougherty	
2024	Dead Money	Chloe	
2026	Vampires of the Velvet Lounge	Joan	

=== Television ===
Year	Title	Role	Notes
2003	Mother Teresa of Calcutta	English Girl	Television film; uncredited
2008–2013	The Secret Life of the American Teenager	Ashley Juergens	Main role (seasons 1–4); special guest (season 5)
2014	Nanny Cam	Heather Lambert	Television film
2016	My Sweet Audrina	Audrina Adare	Television film
2019	I Am the Night	Fauna Hodel	Main role

=== Music video appearances ===
Year	Song	Artist	Ref.
2024	"Stay"	Cha Eun-woo	

== Awards and nominations ==
Year	Award	Category	Nominated work	Result
2019	Satellite Awards	Satellite Award for Best Actress - Miniseries or Television Film	I Am the Night	Nominated
