= Mystikal Ebony =

South African Radio host and Film Maker

Mystikal Ebony is a South African-based, DJ, poet, journalist, radio host and film maker. She is popularly known in the Afro Beat, Reggae, dancehall, Dub Drum and bass and Jungle music circles in South Africa. Her style of music is not genre specific as she comfortably moves between music from different countries and eras.

== Life and career ==
Ebony was born and raised in South Africa to a Ndebele mother and Tsonga father whose roots are from Mozambique. She has an older brother were both raised by her their single mother. Ebony grew up in a small town called Nelspruit, nestled in the sleepy mountains of the Mpumalanga Province. There she attended her primary school and high school before moving to Johannesburg and enrolling at The University of the Witwatersrand where she obtained her master's degree in Film and Media Studies.

Her DJ career kicked off in University where she hosted her own radio show on the campus station Voice of Wits (VOW) for two years. While at Wits in 2005, she entered a DJ competition hosted by a local Reggae sound system, Flames of fire, and she won 2nd prize. That was her foot in the industry, and she took advantage of that opportunity and left her radio show to pursue a career as a club DJ and film-maker. She has written and directed documentaries and films for local television stations such as SABC and Mzansi Magic as well as worked on international sets as an assistant director on movies shot in South Africa such as KITE starring Samuel L Jackson. As a poet her poem 'A Chant For My Sisters' was published in one of the POWA (People Opposing Women Abuse), anthologies of Breaking the Silence.

== Notable performances ==
Mystikal Ebony has opened up for many notable acts including Jamaican stars Lucianio, and Sizzla. In 2015 her mixes featured monthly on one of South Africa's national radio station 5FM. For two consecutive years, she was nominated for Best Female Selktor / DJ on the local reggae music awards Mzansi Reggae Music Awards. 2015 saw her move from club djing to international festivals which lead to her own tours. 2016 she commenced her West African tour in Ghana and 2017 saw her sitting as Ambassador for a clothing brand in South Africa as well as the first ever Africa Reggae Music Awards (ARMA)2019 she embarked on her European tour.
