= Phil Spector (film) =

2013 film

- Promotional poster
- Genre: Biography; Drama
- Written by: David Mamet
- Directed by: David Mamet
- Starring: Al Pacino; Helen Mirren; Jeffrey Tambor; Chiwetel Ejiofor
- Composer: Marcelo Zarvos
- Country of origin: United States
- Original language: English

Production
- Executive producers: Barry Levinson; David Mamet
- Producer: Michael Hausman
- Cinematography: Juan Ruiz Anchía
- Editor: Barbara Tulliver
- Running time: 92 minutes
- Production company: HBO Films

Original release
- Network: HBO
- Release: March 24, 2013

Phil Spector is a 2013 American biographical drama television film written and directed by David Mamet. The film is based on the murder trials of record producer, songwriter and musician Phil Spector, and premiered on HBO on March 24, 2013. It stars Al Pacino as Phil Spector, Helen Mirren as defense attorney Linda Kenney Baden, and Jeffrey Tambor as defense attorney Bruce Cutler. It focuses primarily on the relationship between Spector and Linda Kenney Baden, his defense attorney in 2007 during the first of his two murder trials for the 2003 death of Lana Clarkson in his California mansion, and is billed as "an exploration of the client–attorney relationship" between Spector and Kenney Baden.

The film was controversial for fictionalizing aspects of the case and for neglecting significant evidence that was presented by the real life prosecution, leading to accusations that the movie was created as an advocacy piece in Spector's favor. Spector was not involved with the film, and disputed its historical accuracy. Although it is based on real people and an actual event, it opens with an unusually worded disclaimer that states, "This is a work of fiction. It's not 'based on a true story.' It is a drama inspired by actual persons on a trial, but it is neither an attempt to depict the actual persons, nor to comment upon the trial or its outcome."

== Cast ==
- Al Pacino as Phil Spector
- Helen Mirren as Linda Kenney Baden
- Chiwetel Ejiofor as Mock Prosecutor
- Jeffrey Tambor as Bruce Cutler
- Philip Martin as James Lee
- John Pirruccello as Nick Stavros
- Clara Mamet as Paint Girl
- James Tolkan as Larry Fidler
- Natalia Nogulich as Giovonetta Ricci
- Matthew Rauch as Mike
- Linda Miller as Ronnie Spector
- Rebecca Pidgeon as Dr. Fallon (and also sings "Spanish Harlem" over the closing credits)
- George Aguilar as Mr. Spector's Driver

== Production ==
=== Script ===
In an interview in 2013, Phil Spector's writer and director David Mamet explained that, although he enjoyed Phil Spector's music, he knew nothing about Spector and paid little attention to the murder case against him until 2010, the year after Spector's conviction for murder in his second trial, when Mamet viewed Vikram Jayanti's 2009 BBC documentary The Agony and the Ecstasy of Phil Spector.

The documentary included a compelling interview with Spector that took place just before his first trial in 2007 and news footage of the trial itself, and Jayanti said that he intended to leave the audience with the impression that the charges against Spector were unproved. Mamet said that the documentary gave him an idea to dramatize the story of Spector's first trial by depicting Spector as "a mythological character", and "a man avowed by all to be a monster" like "the Minotaur". Mamet also said that he found it challenging "to take an irrefutable proposition—the guy's obviously guilty—and see if I could refute it" by writing a drama about Spector's case. In a 2013 interview, he described the resulting film as "not a documentary. ... It's basically a fable. It's the fable of the Minotaur, or the fable of beauty and the beast. It's the attraction and repulsion between the young virgin, Helen Mirren, and the Minotaur, Phil Spector."

Mamet drew on court transcripts for portions of the film, and the movie discusses key pieces of evidence that were actually used at Spector's trial. In 2013 interviews, Mamet asserted that "none of the facts in the case have been misrepresented. ...none of the testimony has been misrepresented", and that the film quotes actual court documents verbatim.

However, Mamet also claimed that Phil Spector is otherwise "purposefully hypothetical", that in the film, "almost everything is hypothetical", and that "the reason it's not a true story is that that didn't happen". He explained that Phil Spector is "a fiction about what might happen backstage at the defense team if I were the lead defense attorney. I would say, okay, here are the facts, here's what I think we should do; here's an alternative version that makes sense to me."

Mamet said that his script addresses the question, "'How might the facts suggest reasonable doubt to a jury of 12 people?' Which is very, very different, of course—and this is the point of the film—from innocence." Both Mamet and Mirren said that Phil Spector is a mythological story, which Mamet said is about the fictional version of Linda Kenney Baden "coming to grips with the notion of what is reasonable doubt and what is prejudice".

Mamet called Spector "a fascinating speaker, and like a lot of us autodidacts, he was very interesting to listen to, because his mind ranged wide and unfettered by any system". The dialogue that he made up for the fictional Spector in the movie represents Mamet writing in the way that he believed Spector spoke.

=== Cast and crew ===
Phil Spector originally was supposed to star Bette Midler as Linda Kenney Baden, but Midler left the project two-and-a-half weeks after filming began after suffering a back injury and, according to Helen Mirren, having to be carried off the set. Mamet recalled that the loss of Midler put completion of the film in jeopardy, as it could have led to the loss of Pacino and of the locations and sets as well, and that Mirren's willingness to take on the role on short notice saved the film.

In a December 2002 interview with Spector biographer Mick Brown, Spector stated that he had a lifelong dream that his favorite actor Al Pacino would one day portray him in a film about his life and career. In an article in The Daily Telegraph written at the time of Phil Spector's premiere on television in the United Kingdom in June 2013, Brown noted the irony of Pacino portraying Spector, but in a film about his murder trial rather than about his life and career.

Linda Kenney Baden served as a consultant for the film, and Mamet said in a 2013 interview that he discussed the Spector case with her at length during production of Phil Spector to ensure that it depicted legal thinking and procedures accurately, although she declined to discuss her conversations with Spector, which were protected by the attorney–client privilege. Mamet also said that he attempted to visit Spector in prison before filming began, but Spector refused to see him.

Mamet and Barry Levinson both were executive producers for Phil Spector.

== Historical accuracy ==
Although Phil Spector is based on real people and an actual event, it opens with an unusually worded disclaimer that states, "This is a work of fiction. It's not 'based on a true story.' It is a drama inspired by actual persons in a trial, but it is neither an attempt to depict the actual persons, nor to comment upon the trial or its outcome."

In reviewing the movie, NPR's David Bianculli wrote that the opening disclaimer demands attention and, given Linda Kenney Baden's role as a consultant for the film, that, "even though her [Kenney Baden's] exchanges with the real Phil Spector are protected by attorney-client privilege, you get the feeling — at least I do — that Mamet may not be winging it as much as he claims to be with that disclaimer."

In an article in The Telegraph written at the time of Phil Spector's premiere on television in the United Kingdom in June 2013, Mick Brown, author of Tearing Down the Wall of Sound: The Rise and Fall of Phil Spector, addressed issues related to how fictional—and how historically accurate—the film's depiction of people and events is. In Brown's view, the movie selectively includes evidence supporting Spector's defense and glosses over or ignored prosecution evidence. Specific examples of inaccuracies that Brown cites are:

- The fictional Bruce Cutler's assertion at the beginning of the movie that a magazine article—a real-life article based on an interview that Brown had with Spector in December 2002—that appeared in Telegraph magazine had been faxed to Spector on the day of the shooting, and had "set him off" is incorrect. The article was not published until after Clarkson's death.
- The fictional Cutler's assertion in the film that Spector had been "cold sober" for ten years prior to Clarkson's death is incorrect. Spector began drinking again two months before her death.
- The fictional Linda Kenney Baden declares in the film that she will not "attack the girl", i.e., Clarkson, in court to defend Spector. In fact, Kenney Baden's defense of Spector did include attacking Clarkson in court, and the real Kenney Baden showed a video of Clarkson in blackface imitating Little Richard during the trial, unlike the fictional Kenney Baden, who rejects it.
- The film emphasizes the defense's real-life argument about how Spector pulling the trigger in Clarkson's mouth would have created a massive blood spatter on his clothes, and that no such blood stain occurred, and that this was a major part of Kenney Baden's defense. However, the movie ignores the prosecution's ballistics evidence that Spector pulling the trigger at arm's length would instead have resulted in a misting pattern of blood stains that was found on both Spector's and Clarkson's clothes, consistent with Spector pulling the trigger.
- In real life, the defense countered the prosecution's evidence that Spector told his chauffeur that he had just killed somebody by arguing that the chauffeur simply misheard Spector. In the movie, the Nick Stavros character introduces a fictitious theory that corrupt detectives were coercing the chauffeur into his testimony about Spector's statement, but in real life the chauffeur never wavered in his statements about what Spector said.
- Brown claims that the film's depiction of Spector's arrival at his trial in an outlandish wig is a "distortion", but he declines to give a reason for this opinion.

== Reception ==
Review aggregator site Metacritic has given the film a score of 60 out of 100, signifying "mixed or average" reviews.

In his June 2013 article in The Telegraph, Mick Brown wrote that "Phil Spector is a masterfully executed piece of drama. The dialogue crackles in vintage Mamet fashion, and the performances are uniformly excellent. In his jittery, trembling demeanour, and his flights of self-aggrandising, wounded rhetoric...Pacino seems to be channelling Spector, albeit a Spector possessed of Mamet's considerable erudition and articulacy."

Reviewing Phil Spector for Time Out, Ben Keningsberg wrote that the film makes "an essentially Socratic argument about the legal system's potential to try someone on perception", and that the real pleasure in watching the movie came from seeing Pacino and Mirren deliver Mamet's dialogue, which he described as including many "treasurable retorts".

NPR reviewer David Bianculli wrote that Mamet's dialogue is "crisp and thought-provoking", and that Paccino and Mirren "make the most of it", and that he was "impressed and entertained" by the movie, although he warned that no viewer should trust it for its depiction of events, saying that the movie's opening disclaimer might as well have been Mamet saying, "Don't anybody sue us. I'm just making stuff up, using names and a few bits of court testimony that are in the public record."

In The New York Times, Alessandra Stanley had a more negative impression, saying that, in the film, "there isn't much to provide dramatic tension" between Pacino and Mirren, although it is a credit to them that "they can sustain a story with so little traction", adding that the scenes between Pacino and Mirren seem "a lot like a revisionist re-enactment and maybe even absolution" for Spector, with "the facts of the case and characters...molded to allow viewers to doubt Mr. Spector's guilt", although "there is not much anyone can do to make the audience care". Stanley describes Pacino as playing Spector as "palsied, choleric, and monomaniacal, but not entirely repellent", with "an occasional flash of self-awareness in his eyes and a glint of humored reason in his grandiose diatribes", and that Mirren's portrayal of Linda Kenney Baden, while "refined and regal", is nothing like the real-life Kenney Baden, who Stanley described as a "bleached-blonde scrapper".

Los Angeles Times television critic Robert Lloyd found the film's opening disclaimer not to be based on a true story "disingenuous, if not absurd, given the movie's title, its sprinkling of true facts, and a cast dressed and coiffed to look like the characters whose names they bear", and declared the film "a vexing piece of work" that is "well-crafted, with interesting Big Talent attached", and "better than most films of its kind, even as it remains unsatisfying as historical re-creation, philosophical meditation, or pure drama". Lloyd felt that Phil Spector "plays as a brief for the defense, a one-sided argument for Spector's probable innocence" that makes Clarkson "look pathetic" with no one speaking for her, and that "Pacino doesn't attempt an imitation of his real-life counterpart...this Spector feels more Al than Phil".

== Controversy ==
Spector's wife Rachelle said that the movie was "cheesy". She complained that the movie depicted Spector inaccurately as "a foul-mouthed megalomaniac".

In his June 2013 article, Mick Brown claimed that when Phil Spector premiered on HBO in March 2013, "it achieved the rare feat of offending or upsetting just about everyone", and that unspecified critics have termed it a "moral mess". Brown wrote that "Mamet ignores the evidence that doesn't fit his thesis, so that in the end Phil Spector becomes less an 'exploration' [of the relationship between Spector and Kenney Baden] than an act of advocacy", and he described the movie as "dishonest".

Asked in 2013 whether he thought Spector shot Clarkson, Mamet responded, "I have no idea. And see, the point of the legal system is that nobody has any idea. That's why the opposite of a guilty verdict is not 'innocent,' it's 'not guilty.' In the wisdom of the American jurisprudence system, the onus is on the state. And if the state cannot prove its case, you've got to let the guy go free, whether or not, in the back of all our minds, we think that he actually did it."

Addressing his own view of the Spector case more specifically, Mamet told The Financial Times in 2011, "Whether he did it or not, we'll never know, but if he'd just been a regular citizen, they never would have indicted him."

When Mick Brown asked him in 2013 what he thought about the case, however, Mamet replied, "It's nobody's business. That's what the movie is," although he addressed his 2011 statement by adding, "I do think there's reasonable doubt. But that's very different from saying he was railroaded." When Brown asked him why he had given so little attention to the prosecution's case in his script, Mamet replied, "Well...I'm not making a film about the prosecution."

Mamet also dismissed Brown's concern that the film would mislead many viewers, who would assume it was an accurate depiction of history, and would never bother to look up the facts of the case, saying, "I'm entitled under the First Amendment to write whatever the hell I want, and if someone's fool enough to put it on television that's their problem. But the right is moot if there's going to be some overriding authority that at some point says, 'Aha! But what about x, y and z?' Well that's a problem between me and God, you know...I don't give a shit about the facts."

== Awards and nominations ==
Year	Award	Category	Nominee(s)	Result	Ref.
2013	Artios Awards	Outstanding Achievement in Casting – Television Movie/Mini Series	Sharon Bialy, Sherry Thomas, and Mia Cusumano	Nominated	
2013	Critics' Choice Television Awards	Best Actor in a Movie/Miniseries	Al Pacino	Nominated	
2013	Online Film & Television Association Awards	Best Motion Picture or Miniseries		Nominated	
2013	Online Film & Television Association Awards	Best Actor in a Motion Picture or Miniseries	Al Pacino	Won	
2013	Online Film & Television Association Awards	Best Actress in a Motion Picture or Miniseries	Helen Mirren	Nominated	
2013	Online Film & Television Association Awards	Best Direction of a Motion Picture or Miniseries	David Mamet	Nominated	
2013	Online Film & Television Association Awards	Best Writing of a Motion Picture or Miniseries	David Mamet	Nominated	
2013	Online Film & Television Association Awards	Best Ensemble in a Motion Picture or Miniseries		Nominated	
2013	Online Film & Television Association Awards	Best Cinematography in a Non-Series		Nominated	
2013	Online Film & Television Association Awards	Best Makeup/Hairstyling in a Non-Series		Nominated	
2013	Online Film & Television Association Awards	Best Music in a Non-Series		Nominated	
2013	Online Film & Television Association Awards	Best Production Design in a Non-Series		Nominated	
2013	Primetime Emmy Awards	Outstanding Miniseries or Movie	Barry Levinson, David Mamet, and Michael Hausman	Nominated	
2013	Primetime Emmy Awards	Outstanding Lead Actor in a Miniseries or a Movie	Al Pacino	Nominated	
2013	Primetime Emmy Awards	Outstanding Lead Actress in a Miniseries or a Movie	Helen Mirren	Nominated	
2013	Primetime Emmy Awards	Outstanding Directing for a Miniseries, Movie or a Dramatic Special	David Mamet	Nominated	
2013	Primetime Emmy Awards	Outstanding Writing for a Miniseries, Movie or a Dramatic Special	David Mamet	Nominated	
2013	Primetime Creative Arts Emmy Awards	Outstanding Art Direction for a Miniseries or Movie	Patrizia von Brandenstein, Fredda Slavin, and Diane Lederman	Nominated	
2013	Primetime Creative Arts Emmy Awards	Outstanding Costumes for a Miniseries, Movie or a Special	Debra McGuire and Lorraine Calvert	Nominated	
2013	Primetime Creative Arts Emmy Awards	Outstanding Hairstyling for a Miniseries or a Movie	Stanley Hall, Cydney Cornell, and Michael Kriston	Nominated	
2013	Primetime Creative Arts Emmy Awards	Outstanding Makeup for a Miniseries or a Movie (Non-Prosthetic)	Chris Bingham, Hildie Ginsberg, and John Caglione Jr.	Nominated	
2013	Primetime Creative Arts Emmy Awards	Outstanding Single-Camera Picture Editing for a Miniseries or a Movie	Barbara Tulliver	Nominated	
2013	Primetime Creative Arts Emmy Awards	Outstanding Sound Mixing for a Miniseries or a Movie	Gary Alper, Roy Waldspurger, Michael Barry, and Don White	Nominated	
2013	Women Film Critics Circle Awards	Best Theatrically Unreleased Movie by or About Women	Helen Mirren	Won	
2014	American Cinema Editors Awards	Best Edited Miniseries or Motion Picture for Television	Barbara Tulliver	Nominated	
2014	Art Directors Guild Awards	Excellence in Production Design Award – Television Movie or Mini-Series	Patrizia von Brandenstein, Fredda Slavin, Jeremy Rosenstein, Scott Purcell, and Diane Lederman	Nominated	
2014	Cinema Audio Society Awards	Outstanding Achievement in Sound Mixing for Television Movies and Mini-Series	Gary Alper, Michael Barry, Roy Waldspurger, Chris Fogel, Michael Miller, and Don White	Nominated	
2014	Costume Designers Guild Awards	Outstanding Made for Television Movie or Miniseries	Debra McGuire	Nominated	
2014	Directors Guild of America Awards	Outstanding Directorial Achievement in Movies for Television and Miniseries	David Mamet	Nominated	
2014	Golden Globe Awards	Best Actor – Miniseries or Television Film	Al Pacino	Nominated	
2014	Golden Globe Awards	Best Actress – Miniseries or Television Film	Helen Mirren	Nominated	
2014	Producers Guild of America Awards	David L. Wolper Award for Outstanding Producer of Long-Form Television	Michael Hausman and Barry Levinson	Nominated	
2014	Satellite Awards	Best Miniseries or Motion Picture Made for Television		Nominated	
2014	Satellite Awards	Best Actor in a Miniseries or a Motion Picture Made for Television	Al Pacino	Nominated	
2014	Satellite Awards	Best Actress in a Miniseries or a Motion Picture Made for Television	Helen Mirren	Nominated	
2014	Screen Actors Guild Awards	Outstanding Performance by a Male Actor in a Television Movie or Miniseries	Al Pacino	Nominated	
2014	Screen Actors Guild Awards	Outstanding Performance by a Female Actor in a Television Movie or Miniseries	Helen Mirren	Won	
