= Jerry Giesler =

20th century American lawyer

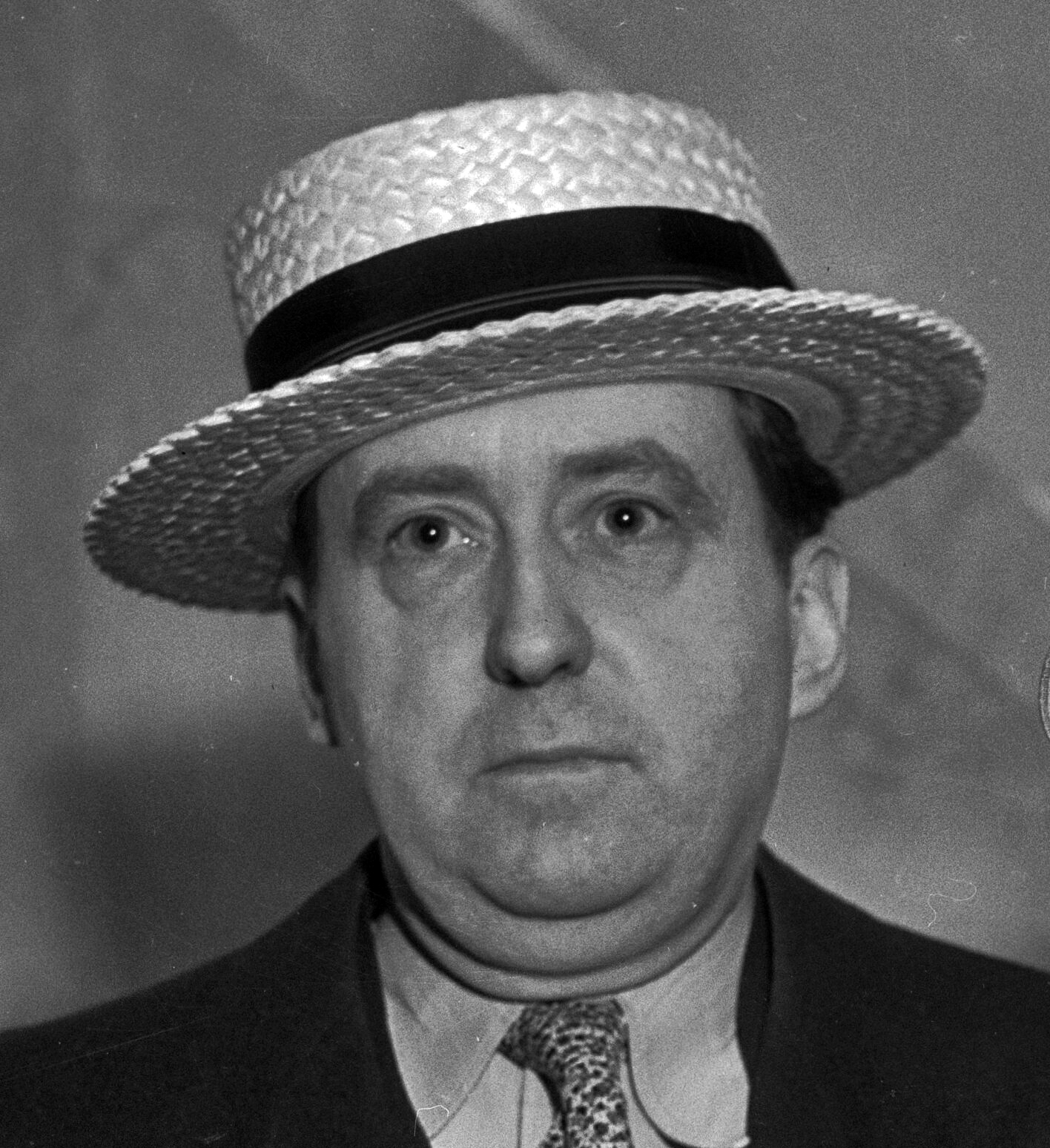
Giesler in 1934

Harold Lee Giesler, known professionally as Jerry Giesler (November 2, 1886 – January 1, 1962) was an American trial attorney.

Giesler was the defense attorney of record for many of the highest-profile litigations, both criminal and civil, in the United States during the first half of the twentieth century. He represented Clarence Darrow, Charles Chaplin, Alexander Pantages (three times), Errol Flynn, Busby Berkeley, Bugsy Siegel, and Marilyn Monroe, among many others. His reputation for winning cases that appeared unwinnable was such that "Get me Giesler!" became a media epithet attached to any celebrity or prominent public figure facing serious criminal charges or an onerous civil dispute.

Giesler served for a number of years on the board of governors of the State Bar of California, and as president of the Beverly Hills Bar Association. Geilser was a founding member and two time president of the esteemed Criminal Courts Bar Association.

== Early career ==
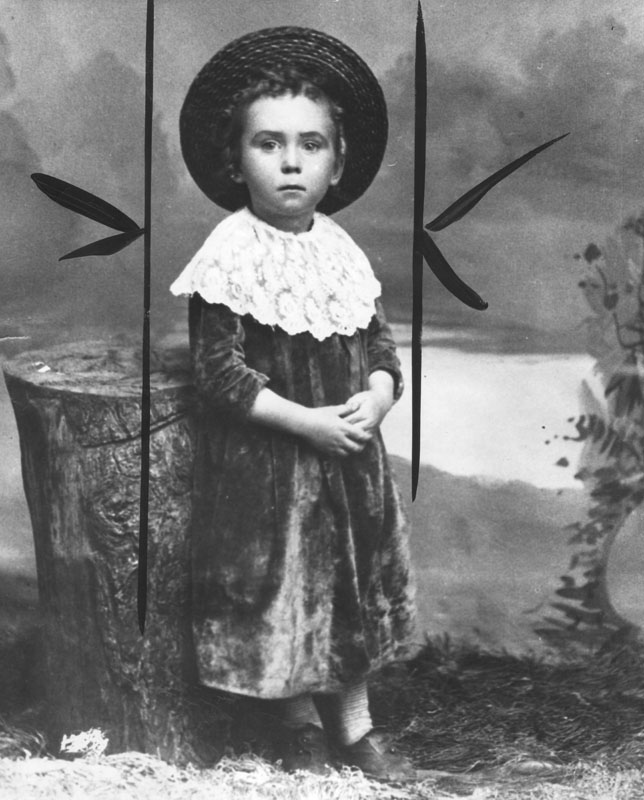
Jerry Giesler as a child, c. 1888

Giesler was born in Wilton Junction, Iowa, on November 2, 1886. Though christened Harold Lee Giesler, he preferred the nickname Jerry from a young age, and used it professionally throughout his career. In 1906 he enrolled at the University of Iowa College of Law. After one year, he relocated to Los Angeles—where he remained for the rest of his life—and continued his law studies at the University of Southern California. Midway through his second year, he began working in the office of the celebrated attorney Earl Rogers, and later left law school to become Rogers' full-time research assistant. In 1910, he was admitted to the bar (a law degree was not a prerequisite for bar candidates at that time; law students could sit for the examination as soon as they felt qualified) and joined Rogers' firm as a junior associate.

In early 1912, Clarence Darrow was charged with two counts of attempted bribery of prospective jurors during the McNamara brothers trial, and retained Rogers to defend him. During preparation, Darrow and Rogers asked Giesler to research a point of law for them. He submitted a 40-page brief, and was invited to join the defense team itself. "Never ... have I had another thrill," he later wrote, "to equal what I felt on being allowed to be a member of such a team." The two charges were tried separately; the first trial ended with acquittal, and the second with a hung jury and dismissal of the case. Darrow later invited Giesler to join his Chicago law firm. Though he considered it "the greatest possible honor", Giesler chose to remain with Rogers, and after Rogers' death, to open his own practice in Los Angeles.

== Famous cases and clients ==
Giesler garnered attention in the 1920s by defending Walburga Oesterreich in the infamous "Love in the Loft" murder case, but became truly famous by defending theater mogul Alexander Pantages for rape. Errol Flynn relied on him to win acquittal on charges of statutory rape. Other famous clients included actor Robert Mitchum, and director Busby Berkeley. After the first two trials for murder ended in hung juries, Berkeley was acquitted in a third.

Giesler also won acquittal for Lili St. Cyr, Charlie Chaplin, gangster Bugsy Siegel and Buron Fitts, a district attorney accused of improper conduct. In the "White Flame Murder" case, Giesler won his client freedom with a temporary insanity defense. He secured a four-month sentence for producer Walter Wanger for shooting his wife's (the actress Joan Bennett) agent. Wanger suspected he and Bennett were having an affair, which she denied.

In December 1949, Giesler won an acquittal of incest and child molestation charges against Dr. George Hodel, who later became a suspect in the still-unsolved Black Dahlia murder investigation.

In 1958, Giesler defended 14-year-old Cheryl Crane, actress Lana Turner's daughter, who was accused of fatally stabbing her mother's abusive lover, gangster Johnny Stompanato. The killing was eventually ruled justifiable homicide.

George Reeves's death from a gunshot wound to the head, in 1959, was ruled a suicide. Reeves's mother thought the ruling premature and peremptory, and retained Giesler to represent her in her bid to have the case reinvestigated as a possible murder. The findings of a second autopsy, conducted at Giesler's request, were the same as the first, except for a series of bruises of unknown origin about the head and body. A month later, having uncovered no additional evidence, Giesler announced that he was satisfied that the gunshot wound had been self-inflicted, and withdrew.

Giesler handled civil as well as criminal cases. He represented Marilyn Monroe in her much publicized 1954 divorce from Joe DiMaggio. Other prominent divorce clients included Rudolph Valentino, Zsa Zsa Gabor, Barbara Hutton, John Crawford, and Shelley Winters.

== Death ==
Jerry Giesler died at age 75 on New Year's Day in 1962, after a series of heart attacks, the last and most serious in October 1961. He was interred in a crypt in the Great Mausoleum of Forest Lawn Memorial Park in Glendale, California.
