= The Curse of Sleeping Beauty =

2016 American fantasy horror film

- Theatrical release poster
- Directed by: Pearry Reginald Teo
- Screenplay by: Pearry Reginald Teo; Josh Nadler
- Based on: The Curse of Sleeping Beauty by: Everette Hartsoe and; Little Briar Rose by; Brothers Grimm Charles Perrault
- Produced by: Ehud Bleiberg; Pearry Reginald Teo
- Starring: Ethan Peck; Natalie Hall; India Eisley; James Adam Lim; Bruce Davison
- Cinematography: Christopher C. Pearson
- Edited by: Damian Drago
- Music by: Scott Glasgow
- Production companies: 2B Films; Briar Rose Productions; Nexus Motion Picture Company
- Distributed by: XLrator Media
- Release date: May 13, 2016
- Running time: 86 minutes
- Country: United States
- Language: English

The Curse of Sleeping Beauty is a 2016 American fantasy horror film directed by Pearry Reginald Teo and written by Teo alongside Josh Nadler. The film stars Ethan Peck, India Eisley and Natalie Hall. It is based on a comic book of the same name by Everette Hartsoe and the story Little Briar Rose by the Brothers Grimm and Charles Perrault.

Filming took place in Los Angeles, California. The film was released by 2B Films on May 13, 2016.

== Plot ==
Thomas Kaiser, a painter, has recurring dreams in which he sees a beautiful sleeping girl but is unable to wake her. When he attempts to kiss her, he is always distracted by a vision of a strange building and wakes in sleep paralysis. One day, he receives a phone call from a law firm informing him of an inheritance from his estranged uncle, Clive.

Thomas is informed his uncle died by suicide, leaving him a letter and a property known as Kaiser Gardens. The letter tells him that the family is cursed. He is startled to find that the inherited property is the same building from his dreams. That night at the property, he dreams of the sleeping girl and this time is able to kiss and awaken her. She tells him her name is Briar Rose. He has a false awakening to an attack from the Veiled Demon. He wakes up from the nightmare to the appraiser, who tells him that many people went missing in the house, but the police found nothing. Thomas finds mannequins in the house and an unmovable door shrine.

While researching the property, Thomas collapses. He confronts the realtor Linda, whose brother went missing in the house. Thomas dreams of Rose, who tells him he must awaken her and that the property belongs to his bloodline. Linda informs him that he is now bound to the property supernaturally and will die if he leaves Kaiser Gardens for too long. They open the shrine door using his blood, revealing a room. They open a book with seals and are attacked by the mannequins. They escape the house with the book and are rescued by Richard Meyers, a paranormal investigator.

Richard tells Thomas they were attacked by a djinn. Thomas believes he must wake Rose in order to break the curse. They hire Daniel, an acquaintance of Linda, to decipher the book. They discover that the family curse dates back to the crusades and a djinn put Rose in an eternal sleep. They deduce that Iblis wants her and they must kill the Veiled Demon and awaken Rose.

Thomas, Linda, and Richard return to Kaiser Gardens and open a second door behind the shrine room. Linda and Richard distract the Veiled Demon while Thomas finds and attempts to wake Rose. Unable to wake her with a kiss, he uses his blood. Rose awakens but attacks Thomas. She kills the Veiled Demon, but before doing so, it tells them that Thomas' bloodline "stores" many demons, which Rose will summon to unleash upon the world. Rose states she will not kill them so they can see the darkness to come and begins to awaken the demons in Thomas' bloodline.

Meanwhile, as Daniel reads the translated curse, he learns that awakening the demons in Thomas' bloodline will trigger the apocalypse. Rose announces the apocalypse has now begun.

== Cast ==
- Ethan Peck as Thomas Kaiser
- Natalie Hall as Linda Coleman
- India Eisley as Briar Rose
- Bruce Davison as Richard Meyers
- James Adam Lim as Daniel
- Zack Ward as Nathan
- Scott Alan Smith as Billings
- Cyd Strittmatter as Dr. Wessley
- Mim Drew as Katherine Braxton
- Dallas Hart as Luke Coleman
- Madelaine Petsch as Eliza
- Ryan Egnatoff as the Veiled Demon
  - Elizabeth Knowelden as the voice of the Veiled Demon
- T.J. Vindigni as Mannequin
- Anna Harr as Young Briar Rose
- Olya Lvova as Assistant to Katherine
- Jacqueline Goehner as Female Clerk
- Pearry Reginald Teo as Shadow Djinn
- Marc Bowen as Doctor
- Alexandra Bard as Sunken Woman

== Release ==
The film was released on May 13, 2016 (Friday the 13th) in the United States.

== Reception ==
The film has received mostly negative reviews. On Rotten Tomatoes, the film has a rating of 17% based on 12 reviews and an average rating of 3.9/10. Luke Thompson of Forbes panned the film stating it "fractures more than a fairy tale". Frank Scheck of The Hollywood Reporter reviewed the film as a "cheesy horror film ... enough to put anyone to sleep".

== Cancelled Television series ==
In October 2017, a television series based on the film was announced is in development. As of 2026 no news is heard.
