= Social Suicide (film) =

- Directed by: Bruce Webb
- Screenplay by: Robert Klecha; Janet Wells
- Story by: Janet Wells
- Produced by: Janet Wells
- Starring: India Eisley; Olivia Hussey; Neve McIntosh; Leonard Whiting
- Cinematography: Oona Menges
- Edited by: Christopher C. F. Chow
- Music by: Graham Kearns
- Release date: 1 October 2015
- Running time: 92 minutes
- Country: United Kingdom
- Language: English

Social Suicide is a 2015 British romantic drama and psychological thriller film starring India Eisley and Jackson Bews. Inspired by William Shakespeare's Romeo and Juliet, the film reunited Olivia Hussey (Eisley's real-life mother in her final role before her death in December 2024) and Leonard Whiting for the first time since the 1968 film adaptation.

== Plot ==
The film is about a group of teenage friends who are content creators, posting their videos on the internet with the hope of becoming popular. The main characters are Balthazar, Reese, Marc, Julia, and Julia's cousin Ty. Other chief characters are Detective Dalton and her staff of investigators, including IT experts and a psychologist, Laurence Emerson.

Balthazar is an obsessive guy who always carries a camera in the hopes of achieving internet virality. He is taking medicines for anxiety and anger. His friend Reese is in love with Julia, who came close with the intent to make videos together. Both are popular YouTubers, and people like them for what they post. However, Balthazar is submissive and socially awkward and is jealous of this couple.

Marc and Ty are found dead, and a team of investigators takes Balthazar into custody for interrogation. He seems scared and confused to the psychologist but deceptive to Detective Dalton from the beginning. Balthazar's obsession with making videos makes him Dalton's chief suspect. Dalton's teenage daughter makes fitness videos in bikinis to become popular, and Dalton is upset by that. So she presumably takes out her anger at Balthazar when she suspects him without any evidence. But Balthazar, too, lies on several occasions and changes his version of the whole incident when he is scared. At these times, a psychologist comes to his rescue. The film revolves around finding proof from a prime piece of evidence in the form of a memory card with a true version of what happened that night, filmed by Balthazar. The detectives have to see how much Balthazar is speaking the truth and whether there is something more to the story. To the viewer's surprise, the film takes a horrifying turn when the truth is finally revealed from the memory card video.

Most of these teenagers in the film are shown as disturbed, lack family connections, and are lonely. They make decisions that are misinformed and risky. They don't understand the consequences of their behaviors and interests. While leaving police custody, when the psychologist Emerson suggests Balthazar stop making videos and go for participatory activities in the real social world, Balthazar seems totally ignorant of the message in his words and tells him that now he is going to make the video that deserves 1 million views. Psychologists supported Balthazar throughout the film with the hope of giving him warmth and understanding of his condition. Still, all went to waste as Bal was so occupied with his upcoming popularity. Bal seems unaware of what harm this video craze has done to him and brought his friends into trouble. The movie shows very closely the delicate make-up of the teenage mind and how things can go wrong if parents don't pay much attention and do not connect with them emotionally.

== Cast ==
- India Eisley as Julia Coulson
- Olivia Hussey as Mrs. Coulson
- Neve McIntosh as Detective Dalton
- Leonard Whiting as Mr. Coulson
- Aymen Hamdouchi as Hughie
- Richard Cordery as Laurence Emerson
- Shaquille Ali-Yebuah as Marc
- Georgia Lock as Rozi
- Jackson Bews as Balthazar
- Rollo Skinner as Reese Mattson
- Zac Fox as Junior Tech
- Barney White as Ty
- Gio Fonseca as Justin
- Luke Mordue as Young Cop
- Christian Di Sciullo as Cop
- Meg McNaughton as Family Friend
- Jurgen Schwarz as Custody Officer
- Eleanor Thorn as Sarah
- Katy Helps as Police Woman
- Millie Mason as Millie
- Alistair Donegan as O'Rourke
- Vicky Peirson as Registrar
- Bethan Williams-James as Baked Bean Girl
