= Dead Money (film) =

- Promotional poster
- Directed by: Luc Walpoth
- Written by: Josh Wilcox
- Produced by: Seth Michaels; Sara Sometti Michaels; Reece Foster
- Starring: Emile Hirsch; David Keith; India Eisley; Rory Culkin; Jackie Earle Haley
- Production companies: Benacus Entertainment; RNF Productions
- Distributed by: Samuel Goldwyn Films
- Release date: September 13, 2024
- Running time: 100 minutes
- Country: United States
- Language: English

Dead Money is a 2024 American thriller film written by Josh Wilcox, directed by Luc Walpoth and starring Emile Hirsch, David Keith, India Eisley, Rory Culkin and Jackie Earle Haley.

== Plot ==
Professional poker player Andy and his girlfriend Chloe are involved in a crazy 24 hours after a home poker game is robbed. Andy ends up playing the largest poker game of his life as both of their lives are in danger.

== Cast ==
- Emile Hirsch as Andy
- India Eisley as Chloe
- Rory Culkin as Uncle Lonnie AKA Revolver
- David Keith as Jack
- Jackie Earle Haley as Wendel AKA Shotgun
- Peter Facinelli as LT
- Jimmy Jean-Louis as Faizel
- Jocelyn Hudon as Kelly
- Michael Malarkey as Freddy
- Yung Bleu as Deshawn Jefferson
- Seth Michaels as Julio

== Release ==
The film was released on September 13, 2024.

== Reception ==
The film has a 25% rating on Rotten Tomatoes based on 12 reviews. Peter Sobczynski of RogerEbert.com awarded the film two stars out of four. Julian Roman of MovieWeb rated the film a two out of five. Richard Roeper of the Chicago Sun-Times awarded the film three stars out of four.
