= Jessica Brody =

American author of young adult fiction

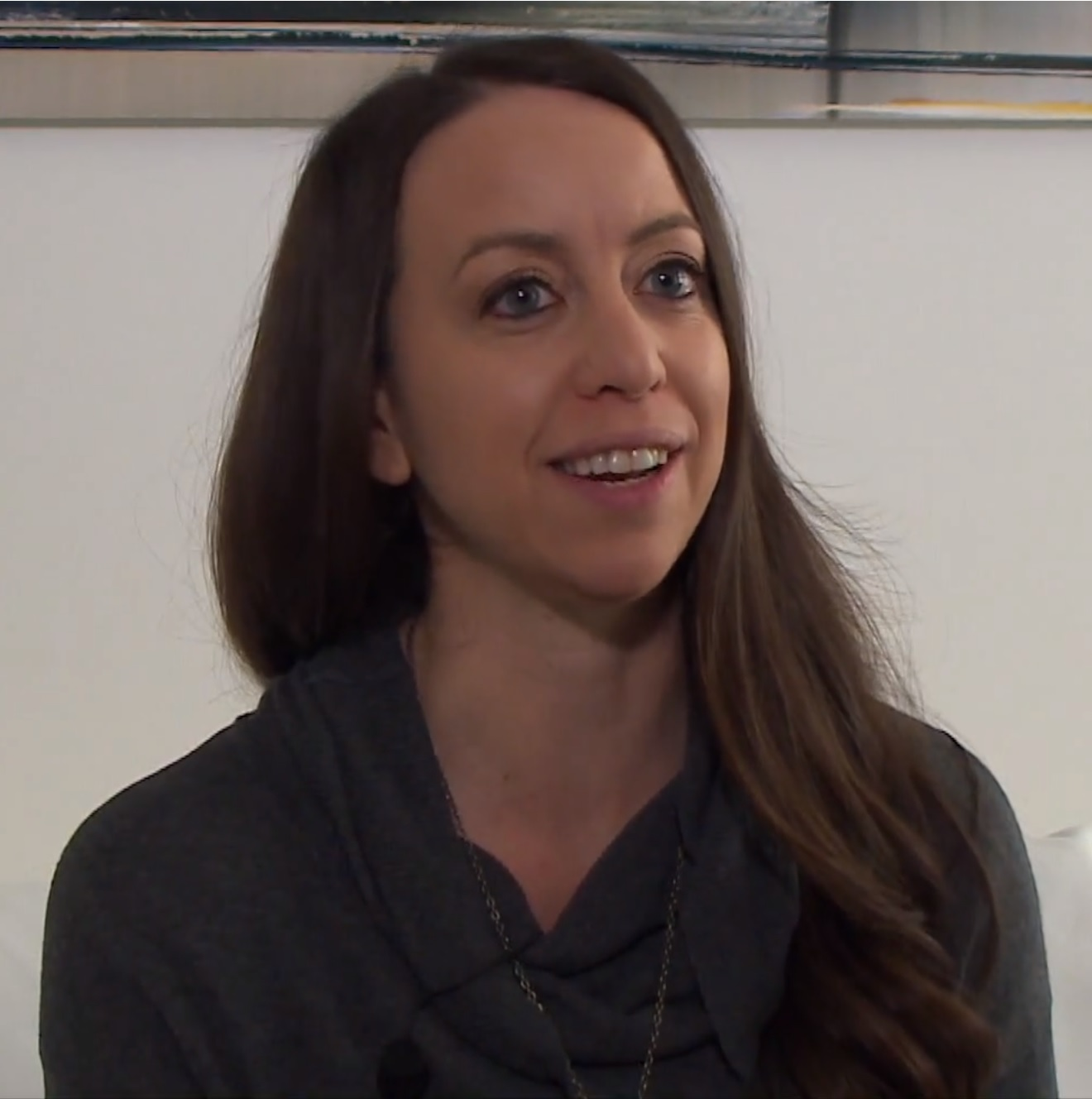
- Brody interviewed by Librairie Mollat in 2015
- Education: Smith College
- Writing career
- Years active: 2005–present
- Website: jessicabrody.com

Jessica Brody is an American author and writing teacher. Her writing consists mainly of young adult fiction.

== Early life ==
Brody graduated from Smith College in 2001 with a double major in economics and French and worked for MGM Studios until 2005, when she quit to pursue becoming a full-time author. She credits Bridget Jones's Diary with reigniting her childhood passion for writing. Brody sold her first novel a year and a half after quitting MGM.

== Books ==
While most of Brody's books are for teens, her first two published novels, The Fidelity Files and Love Under Cover, were women's fiction for adults. The first novel she wrote after leaving MGM was never published; after three years of submitting the completed manuscript to different agents, Brody started a new novel. She was signed by an agent for her second novel, five years after starting her career as an author. The agent sold that novel in ten days.

Brody published her first young adult novel, The Karma Club, in April 2010. She is known for her Unremembered and Disney Descendants: School of Secrets series of young adult fiction novels. The genesis of the Unremembered trilogy was with a news article about a teenage girl who was the sole survivor of a plane crash, which inspired Brody to speculate on reasons why she was the only survivor.

Brody sold the publishing rights for her first middle-grade novel, Addie Montgomery's Shortcut to Growing Up, to Delacorte Press in 2015. The novel was eventually retitled Addie Bell's Shortcut to Growing Up when it was published in 2017.

Brody and fellow author Joanne Rendell developed the System Divine series, the first book of which, Sky Without Stars, was published in March 2019. The publishing rights for the series were sold to Simon & Schuster in a six-figure deal in 2017.

=== Jennifer Hunter ===
1. The Fidelity Files. St. Martin's Press. June 10, 2008. ISBN 9781429926034.
2. Love Under Cover. St. Martin's Press. November 10, 2009. ISBN 9781429983648.

=== The Unremembered trilogy ===
1. Unremembered. Farrar, Straus and Giroux. March 5, 2013. ISBN 9780374379919.
2. Unforgotten. Farrar, Straus and Giroux. February 25, 2014. ISBN 9780374379902.
3. Unchanged. Farrar, Straus and Giroux. February 24, 2015. ISBN 9780374379896.

==== Novellas ====
- The Memory Coder. Tor/Forge. February 26, 2013. ISBN 9781466838994.
- The Intelligence Director. Tor/Forge. January 14, 2014. ISBN 9781466861640.
- Undiscovered: An Unremembered Novella. Farrar, Straus and Giroux. February 14, 2014. ISBN 9780374301255.
- Unleashed: An Unremembered Novella. Farrar, Straus and Giroux. January 13, 2015. ISBN 9780374379797.
- The Human Engineer. Tor/Forge. February 4, 2015. ISBN 9781466886216.

=== Disney Descendants: School of Secrets series ===
1. CJ's Treasure Chase. Disney Book Group. August 30, 2016. ISBN 978-1-4847-7864-7.
2. Freddie's Shadow Cards. Disney Book Group. October 25, 2016. ISBN 978-1-4847-7865-4.
3. Ally's Mad Mystery. Disney Book Group. February 28, 2017. ISBN 978-1-4847-7866-1.
4. Lonnie's Warrior Sword. Disney Book Group. August 15, 2017. ISBN 978-1-4847-7867-8.
5. Carlos's Scavenger Hunt. Disney Book Group. November 14, 2017. ISBN 978-1-3680-1398-7.

=== System Divine trilogy (with Joanne Rendell) ===
1. Sky Without Stars. Simon & Schuster. March 2019. ISBN 9781534410633.
2. Between Burning Worlds. Simon & Schuster. April 2021. ISBN 9781534410671.
3. Suns Will Rise. Simon & Schuster. August 2022. ISBN 9781534474444.

=== Standalone ===
- The Karma Club. Farrar, Straus and Giroux. April 27, 2010. ISBN 9781429946391.
- My Life Undecided. Farrar, Straus and Giroux. June 7, 2011. ISBN 9781429940993.
- 52 Reasons to Hate My Father. Farrar, Straus and Giroux. July 3, 2012. ISBN 9781429955232.
- Boys of Summer. Simon & Schuster. April 2016. ISBN 9781481463485.
- A Week of Mondays. Farrar, Straus and Giroux. August 2, 2016. ISBN 9780374382704.
- Addie Bell's Shortcut to Growing Up. Penguin Random House. February 14, 2017. ISBN 978-0-399-55510-7.
- In Some Other Life. Farrar, Straus and Giroux. August 8, 2017. ISBN 9780374380762.
- The Chaos of Standing Still. Simon & Schuster. November 2017. ISBN 978-1481499187.
- The Geography of Lost Things. Simon & Schuster. October 2018. ISBN 9781481499217.
- Better you than me. Delacorte Press. November 13, 2018. ISBN 978-1-5247-6971-0.
- I speak boy. Delacorte Press. 2021. ISBN 978-0-593-17370-1.
- Amelia Gray Is Almost Okay. Delacorte Press. March 28, 2023. ISBN 978-0593666845.
- How to Write a Murder: A Novel. Random House Publishing Group. September 22, 2026. ISBN 9798217299478.

=== Nonfiction ===
- The Complete Guide to Getting Published: An author-to-author guide to selling your novel to a major publisher. October 5, 2016.
- Save the Cat! Writes a Novel: The Last Book on Novel Writing You'll Ever Need (based on the books by Blake Snyder). Penguin Random House. October 9, 2018. ISBN 9780399579752.
- Save the cat! writes a young adult novel: the ultimate guide to writing a YA bestseller. Ten Speed Press. July 18, 2023. ISBN 978-1-9848-5924-2.
- Page One to Done: Finish Your Novel in 30 Days with the Fast Drafting Method. Hay House. May 19, 2026. ISBN 9781401998424.

== Film adaptations ==
Film rights to Brody's book Unremembered have been acquired by Reliance Entertainment and Kintop Pictures. The Fidelity Files and 52 Reasons to Hate My Father have also been optioned for film. 52 Reasons is also being developed by Reliance and Kintop; and a screenplay has been written by Karen McCullah.

== Writing instruction ==
Brody offers writing instruction and advice on a variety of platforms, including YouTube and Udemy. She founded Writing Mastery Academy, an online, subscription-based writing instruction platform offering video classes, webinars, and a community site.
