= George Hodel =

American physician, suspected Black Dahlia killer (1907–1999)

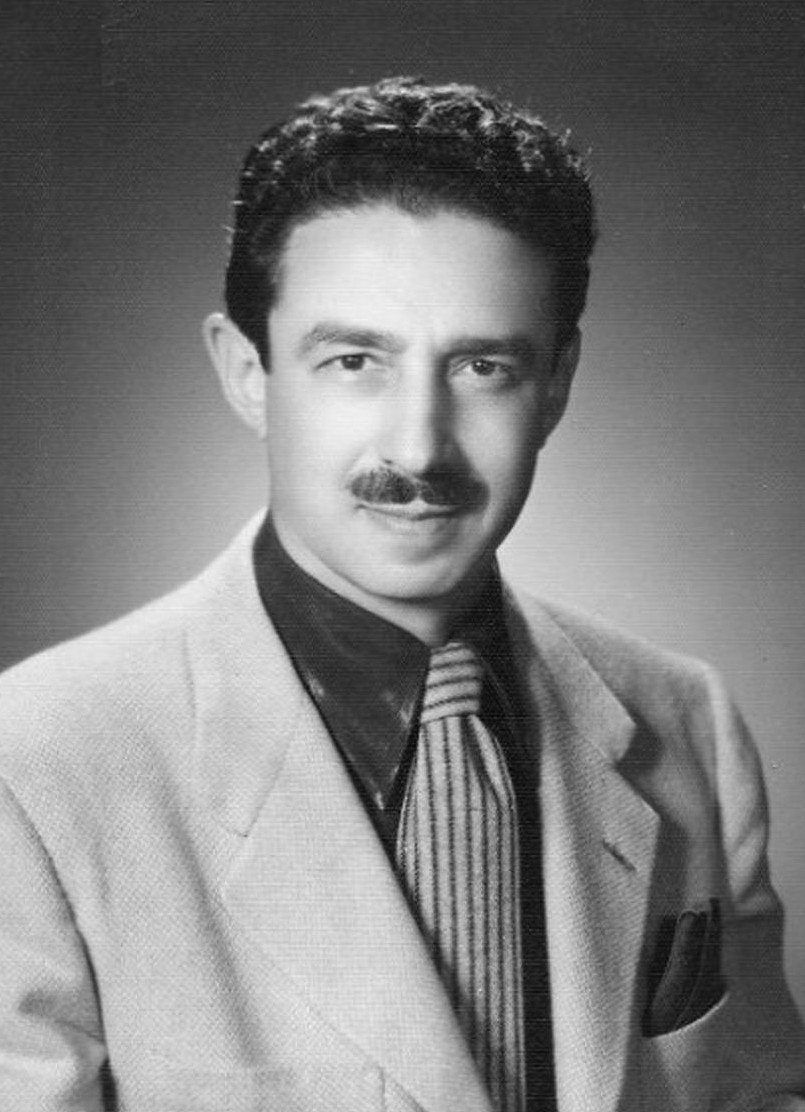
- Hodel c. 1952
- Born: George Hill Hodel; October 10, 1907; Los Angeles, California, U.S.
- Died: May 17, 1999 (aged 91); San Francisco, California, U.S.
- Occupation: Physician
- Known for: Black Dahlia murder suspect
- Spouses: Emilia (common law; m. 1928–1930s); Dorothy Anthony (m. 1930s–1940); Dorothy Harvey (m. 1940–c. 1950); Hortensia Laguda (m. 1950–c. 1960s); June Hodel (m. 1990)
- Children: Duncan, son, by Emilia Tamar, daughter, by Anthony Michael, Steven, and Kelvin, sons, by Harvey Four children by Laguda

George Hill Hodel (October 10, 1907 – May 17, 1999) was an American physician, and a prime suspect in the 1947 murder of Elizabeth Short, also known as the Black Dahlia. He was initially considered a viable suspect but never formally charged with the crime and police ultimately cleared him after several weeks of investigation. However, two of Hodel's children believe he was guilty of killing Short. Hodel was also charged with the rape of his daughter, Tamar Hodel, but was acquitted of that crime. He lived overseas several times, primarily in the Philippines between 1950 and 1990.

== Early life ==
George Hill Hodel Jr. was born on October 10, 1907, in Los Angeles, California, the only son of George Hodel Sr. and Esther Hodel (née Leov), who were Jewish immigrants from the Russian Empire. Hodel was well-educated and highly intelligent, scoring 186 on an early IQ test. He was also a musical prodigy as a pianist.

At a young age Hodel was sent to Paris and was enrolled in the Montessori school, run by Anna Montessori. He later attended South Pasadena High School and graduated early, at age 15. Hodel enrolled at the California Institute of Technology (Caltech) in Pasadena, but was forced to leave the university after one year, due in part to a sex scandal involving a professor's wife. He had impregnated the woman and wanted to raise their child together, but she refused. The affair between Hodel and the woman caused her marriage to fall apart.

By around 1928, Hodel was in a common-law marriage with a woman named Emilia, and they had a son, Duncan. In the 1930s, Hodel was legally married to Dorothy Anthony, a fashion model from San Francisco, with whom he had a daughter, Tamar.

Hodel graduated from Berkeley pre-med in June 1932. Immediately afterward, he enrolled in the medical school at the University of California, San Francisco, and received his medical degree in June 1936.

== Career ==
After conducting his medical practice, and becoming head of the county's Social Hygiene Bureau, Hodel was moving in affluent Los Angeles society by the 1940s. He was enamored with Surrealism and the decadence surrounding that art scene, befriending photographer Man Ray, film director John Huston, and their associates. With Ray and some other Surrealists, he shared an interest in sadomasochism and, with the young men of the Hollywood scene, he shared a fondness for partying, drinking, and womanizing.

In 1940, Hodel married Dorothy Harvey, John Huston's ex-wife. He called her "Dorero" to avoid confusion with his other wife, Dorothy Anthony, at least within their circle, but she was better known as Dorothy Huston-Hodel. Hodel purchased the Sowden House in 1945 and lived there from 1945 until 1950. The structure, built in 1926 by Lloyd Wright, the son of the noted American architect Frank Lloyd Wright, has since been registered as a Los Angeles historic landmark.

By the late 1940s, Hodel was effectively a polygamist. Around the time of the death of Elizabeth Short, and the suspected suicide of his clinical secretary, Ruth Spaulding, he was living with "Dorero" and their three children, as well as his first legal wife, Dorothy Anthony, and their daughter Tamar and, at times, his original common-law wife, Emilia, the mother of Hodel's eldest child, who was an adult by that time. Hodel was also prone to taking temporary lovers, and witnesses later suggested such a relationship between him and the "Black Dahlia", Elizabeth Short, who was found murdered on January 15, 1947.

In March 1950, Hodel left the United States for Hawaii, then a U.S. territory, where he married an upper-class Filipino woman, Hortensia Laguda. After having four children, they divorced in the 1960s. Laguda later became a member of the Philippines Congress, as Hortensia Starke.

== Death ==
Hodel returned to California in 1990, and lived in San Francisco for the rest of his life. During that time, he married his fourth (legal) wife, a woman named June. Hodel died in May 1999, at the age of 91.

== Murder and rape suspect ==
On January 15, 1947, the naked body of 22-year-old Elizabeth Short was discovered in an empty lot in the Leimert Park neighborhood of Los Angeles. Short had suffered gruesome mutilation: her body had been bisected at the waist, and her mouth was cut ear to ear. The case earned major publicity and prompted one of the largest investigations in the history of the Los Angeles Police Department. The case was never solved. Authorities at the time interviewed hundreds of suspects and focused seriously on about 25, including Hodel. However, police investigation of Hodel was not known publicly until decades later.

In late 1949, Hodel's teenage daughter Tamar accused him of incestuous sexual abuse and impregnating her. He was acquitted after a widely publicized trial. Two witnesses to the alleged abuse testified at the trial. A third recanted her earlier testimony and refused to come forward, with one theory being George threatened her into silence.

Hodel came to police attention as a suspect in the Elizabeth Short murder in 1949 after the sexual abuse trial. Known or suspected sex criminals were being investigated for the Short case, and it had also come out in that trial that Tamar had allegedly claimed her father was the Dahlia killer. She denied the claim during the 1949 trial, but years later said she had actually believed her father was a murderer. Hodel's medical degree also aroused suspicion, given the hypothesis that whoever bisected Short's body had some degree of surgical skill. Full details of the investigation came to light only in 2003, when a "George Hodel–Black Dahlia File" was discovered in archives at the Los Angeles County District Attorney's office. The file revealed that in 1950, Hodel was a suspect of the Dahlia murder. His Hollywood residence was electronically bugged by an 18-man DA/LAPD task force between February 15 and March 27, 1950. The DA tapes recorded him saying:

Supposin' I did kill the Black Dahlia. They can't prove it now. They can't talk to my secretary anymore because she's dead. They thought there was something fishy. Anyway, now they may have figured it out. Killed her. Maybe I did kill my secretary.

This statement by Hodel was not considered strong evidence by LAPD homicide investigators, who were unable to prove Hodel ever met Short despite efforts to establish timelines and whereabouts. William J. Mann argues a full reading of the transcript shows Hodel strongly suspected his house was bugged, and Hodel was most likely taunting the police with provocative comments.

Additional incriminating statements obtained during the five-week stakeout and documented in the transcripts were as follows: "This is the best payoff I've seen between Law Enforcement Agencies. You do not have the right connection made in the D.A.' office. Don't confess ever..." "Im in trouble. "Black Dahlia..."Police have pictures of me and...I thought I had destroyed all of them." "Hodel talking to a woman about his downtown clinic. Hodel talking to a woman who mentions having had a "currettement" (1940s term for an abortion). "Hodel tells her he has done lots of them." 2-18-50 recording, "Put a pillow over her head, and covered her with a blanket. Got a taxi. Call Georgia Street Receiving Hospital right away. Expired at 12:39. (His secretary, Ruth Spaulding.) They thought there was something fishy. Anyway, now they may have figured it out. Killed her. Maybe I did kill my secretary..." "Don't say anything on the phone, it's tapped." "They are probably watching me. Do you think we could hire some girls to find out what they are doing?" (Source DA Hodel/Black Dahlia Transcripts.)

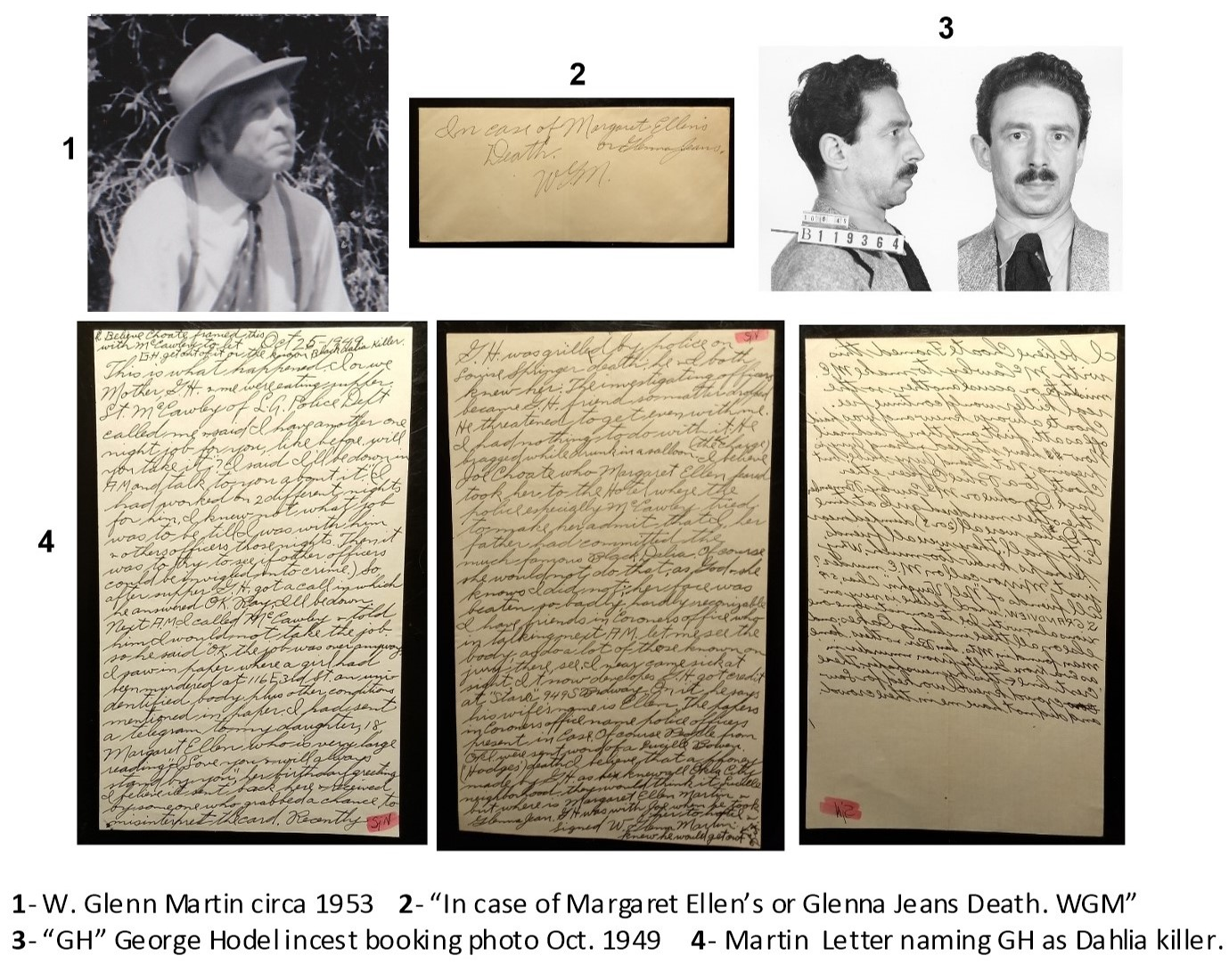
W. Glenn Martin's "Dying Declaration Letter"

Hodel was also allegedly interviewed as a suspect in the June 1949 murder of Louise Springer, the "Green Twig Murder", whose body was found a few blocks from where Short's was found. Evidence to support this accusation was not available publicly until July 2018. In July 2018 Sandi Nichols of Indianapolis, Indiana, discovered a three-page "Dying Declaration Letter" written by her grandfather, W. Glenn Martin, dated October 26, 1949. Martin had worked as an LAPD informant, and wrote the letter to be publicized in the event either of his then-teenage daughters came to harm. The Martin letter, reproduced in full in the chapter "Afterword" in Steve Hodel's Black Dahlia Avenger III, went on to name a man called "GH", identifying GH as a personal acquaintance of Martin and an LAPD detective. Martin also alleged GH was the killer of both Short and Springer, but claimed GH was being protected by high ranking officials. Steve Hodel argues information in the Martin letter, if accurate, shows LAPD officers saw George Hodel as a murder suspect some three months prior to his arrest on sex abuse charges in October of that same year.

In October 1949, Hodel's name was mentioned in a formal written report to the grand jury as one of five prime suspects in the Short murder. None of the named suspects was submitted to the grand jury for consideration for indictment, as the investigation was still ongoing. However, another memo indicated Hodel was later eliminated by the LAPD as a suspect for the Short murder, mainly because police had a detailed timeline of Short's whereabouts and could not established she and Hodel ever met.

Hodel obtained a degree in psychiatry and counseled prisoners in the Territorial prison in Hawaii for three years, then moved on to the Philippines, where he started a new family, and appears to have remained until 1990, finally dying in 1999 in San Francisco without charges ever being filed. However, his son Steve has written that he believes Hodel re-entered the United States multiple times each year from 1958 through 1988 and specifically in 1966–1969 to commit more murders including those attributed to the Zodiac Killer, and then return to the Philippines. In later years, Steve Hodel claimed to have found eight persons who said George was acquainted with Short.

=== Reactions ===
After Hodel died in 1999, his son Steve Hodel, a former LAPD homicide detective, started investigating his father as a possible suspect in the Elizabeth Short murder and has written several books on the subject.

A September 2006 episode of Cold Case Files, hosted by Bill Kurtis, illustrates the mixed reaction to Steve Hodel's hypothesis as outlined in his first book Black Dahlia Avenger (2003). Head Deputy District Attorney Stephen Kay described himself as highly impressed by Steve Hodel's research and conclusions and even went so far as to declare the case had been solved. Less impressed was active Detective Brian Carr, the LAPD officer then in charge of the Black Dahlia case, which was still officially open. Carr's opinion was that Hodel's theory was based on a few intriguing facts linked together by unsubstantiated supposition. Short's relatives also disagreed that the photos in Hodel's album were of Short. Carr added that if he ever took a case as weak as Steve Hodel's to a prosecutor he would be "laughed out of the office". Carr, admitting that he had not read all of Steve Hodel's materials, added, "I don't have the time to either prove or disprove Hodel's investigation. I am too busy working on active cases." Steve Hodel has since produced two additional books on the Dahlia case, and several books on the Zodiac Killer and other cases, attempting to link them to his father.

Author William J. Mann in his 2026 book on the Short case argues the main flaw in seeing Hodel as a murder suspect was the lack of unambiguous evidence or testimony from credible witnesses that he ever met Short, whose activities and associates during her final months in Los Angeles are very well documented. There was only a brief period of six to eight weeks in late 1946 when Short and George Hodel could have possibly met, but Short's social life was busy with numerous dates and brief relationships with at least six young men during her time in Los Angeles. Mann also argues the allegation that Hodel killed Short originated with, or was promoted by, Hodel's own defense attorneys, who used the allegation as a means to smear the reputation of Tamar during the rape trial by attempting to depict her as a pathological liar.

=== Media coverage ===
In January 2019, the American TV network TNT simultaneously aired two "companion" productions. The first, a six-part limited television miniseries titled I Am the Night, is a fictionalized drama focusing on the life of Fauna Hodel and her discovery that her grandfather George Hill Hodel (played by actor Jefferson Mays) was the prime suspect in the Black Dahlia Murder (in real life, Fauna Hodel never met her grandfather in person, though they had one phone conversation in which George informed Fauna that Tamar was residing in Hawaii). Scenes for the series were shot on location at Hodel's 1945–50 residence, the historic John Sowden House, built by Frank Lloyd Wright Jr. at 5121 Franklin Avenue, Hollywood, California.

The second project was an eight-part documentary podcast, entitled Root of Evil: The True Story of the Hodel Family and the Black Dahlia, a Cadence13/TNT production using archival audio and interviews with Hodel family members. The podcast includes many of the actual investigative findings and claims linkage of George Hodel to the Black Dahlia murder.

Both series surmise that Fauna might be both the granddaughter and the daughter of Hodel, though there is no evidence of her father's identity. In 1949, George Hodel had been arrested and tried for incest by LAPD; his 14-year-old daughter Tamar accused him of raping her, resulting in a pregnancy she aborted. Hodel obtained criminal defense attorney Jerry Giesler and was acquitted after a three-week jury trial.

The Root of Evil producer Zak Levitt was able to obtain DNA analysis and a review of the results by a prominent expert, which positively eliminated George Hodel as the biological father of Fauna Hodel.

There was also a twenty-minute segment summarizing all these different theories, on the Discovery Channel documentary series The Expedition Files hosted by Josh Gates, on April 23, 2025.

== See also ==
- Fauna Hodel — Hodel's granddaughter and true-crime author
- I Am the Night, a 2019 TNT Drama TV miniseries, featuring Jefferson Mays as George Hodel
- Root of Evil: The True Story of the Hodel Family and the Black Dahlia
- Graysmith, Robert (2007) [1986]. Zodiac (Berkley mass-market movie tie-in ed.). Berkley Books. ISBN 978-0-425-21218-9.
