= Kite (2014 film) =

- Directed by: Ralph Ziman
- Screenplay by: Brian Cox
- Based on: Kite by Yasuomi Umetsu
- Produced by: Anant Singh; Brian Cox; Moisés Cosío
- Starring: India Eisley; Callan McAuliffe; Samuel L. Jackson
- Cinematography: Lance Gewer
- Edited by: Megan Gill
- Music by: Paul Hepker
- Production companies: Videovision Entertainment; Distant Horizon; Detalle Films
- Distributed by: Anchor Bay Entertainment
- Release dates: 12 June 2014 (Russia); 28 August 2014 (U.S. VOD)
- Running time: 90 minutes
- Countries: South Africa; United States
- Language: English
- Box office: $507,180

Kite (also called A Kite) is a 2014 South African-American action film directed by Ralph Ziman, based on the 1998 anime of the same name by Yasuomi Umetsu. The film stars India Eisley, Callan McAuliffe and Samuel L. Jackson. The film was universally panned by critics, earning a 0% rating on the review aggregator website Rotten Tomatoes.

== Synopsis ==
In a dystopian society plagued by crime, children are kidnapped and sold to trafficking networks. A young woman named Sawa lives in this environment, where gangs dominate the streets. After her mother and father, a police officer, are murdered in a double homicide, Sawa sets out to find those responsible. With the assistance of her father's former partner, Karl Aker, and a figure from her past, she becomes a vigilante assassin targeting criminals. Following each killing, Sawa uses a drug called Amp, which helps her cope but also erases her memories.

== Cast ==
- India Eisley as Sawa
- Callan McAuliffe as Oburi
- Samuel L. Jackson as Lieutenant Karl Aker
- Carl Beukes as Vic Thornhill
- Terence Bridgett as Staggie Steyns / Sascha Steyns
- Deon Lotz as Detective Prinsloo
- Zane Meas as The Emir
- Lionel Newton as Otis Breedlove
- Louw Venter as Captain Reynhoek
- Keci Eatock as young Sawa

== Production ==
=== Pre-production ===
A live-action adaptation of Kite was reported to be in under consideration at Distant Horizons studios from at least 2003, with press releases announcing American film director Rob Cohen attached as either director or producer. On 2 September 2011, after eight years of effort to move forward into pre-production, David R. Ellis was hired to direct the live-action adaptation. On 17 December 2012, Samuel L. Jackson announced that he was the first actor to join the cast of Ellis's Kite, with filming to take place in Johannesburg. Ellis died on 7 January 2013, before shooting started. On 3 February 2013, it was announced that Ralph Ziman had taken over as director of the film, and that actors India Eisley and Callan McAuliffe had joined the cast.

In 2023, South African actress Liesl Ahlers revealed she was the first runner-up for the role of Sawa. She admitted that at the time, her inability to perform the stunts required, had her lose the role to India Eisley. However, on a positive note, the experience inspired to begin training in the martial art of Hapkido, which she has been learning since 2014.

=== Filming ===
Filming took place in February 2013 in Johannesburg, South Africa.

== Marketing ==
The 10-minute trailer for the film was released on 6 January 2014, followed by another trailer on 16 July 2014.

== Release ==
On 10 May 2013, The Weinstein Company acquired worldwide distribution rights for Kite outside of the US, South Africa, and India. On 17 April 2014, Anchor Bay Entertainment acquired the US and Canada distribution rights to the film.

The film was released to theatres in foreign markets starting in June 2014, and was distributed direct-to-video in the United States and Canada starting August 2014.

== Reception ==
=== Box office ===
Kite was not released theatrically in domestic markets, while grossing $0.5 million at the box office in other territories.

=== Critical response ===
On the review aggregator website Rotten Tomatoes, 0% of 15 critics' reviews are positive, with an average rating of 2.7/10. Metacritic, which uses a weighted average, assigned the film a score of 19 out of 100, based on 7 critics, indicating "overwhelming dislike".

John DeFore of The Hollywood Reporter wrote on his review that "Ralph Ziman's Kite repackages an assortment of genre tropes into an instantly forgettable Luc Besson-aping slog that would be unneeded even if Besson hadn't just returned to big action flicks himself." Peter Debruge of Variety commented: "The super-controversial, often-censored story of an orphaned schoolgirl turned sex slave and assassin isn't for everyone (and you can't entirely blame those countries whose strict anti-child pornography laws deemed it wasn't for anyone), although a slicker, less overtly kinky remake should have been catnip to Sin City and Sucker Punch fans. But judging by the disappointing results, this uninspired Anchor Bay release awaits homevid obscurity." Peter Howell of the Toronto Star gave the film two out of four stars, commenting that "Ziman creates a visually interesting, graffiti-festooned landscape, there's a plenitude of action – including some truly goring death scenes – and Eisley and Callan McAuliffe as Oburi are both nicely appealing. But the tedium soon sets in, thanks mostly to a story that feels clichéd beyond bearing, including a final twist that is so 'never mind.'"
