= Jefferson Mays =

American actor

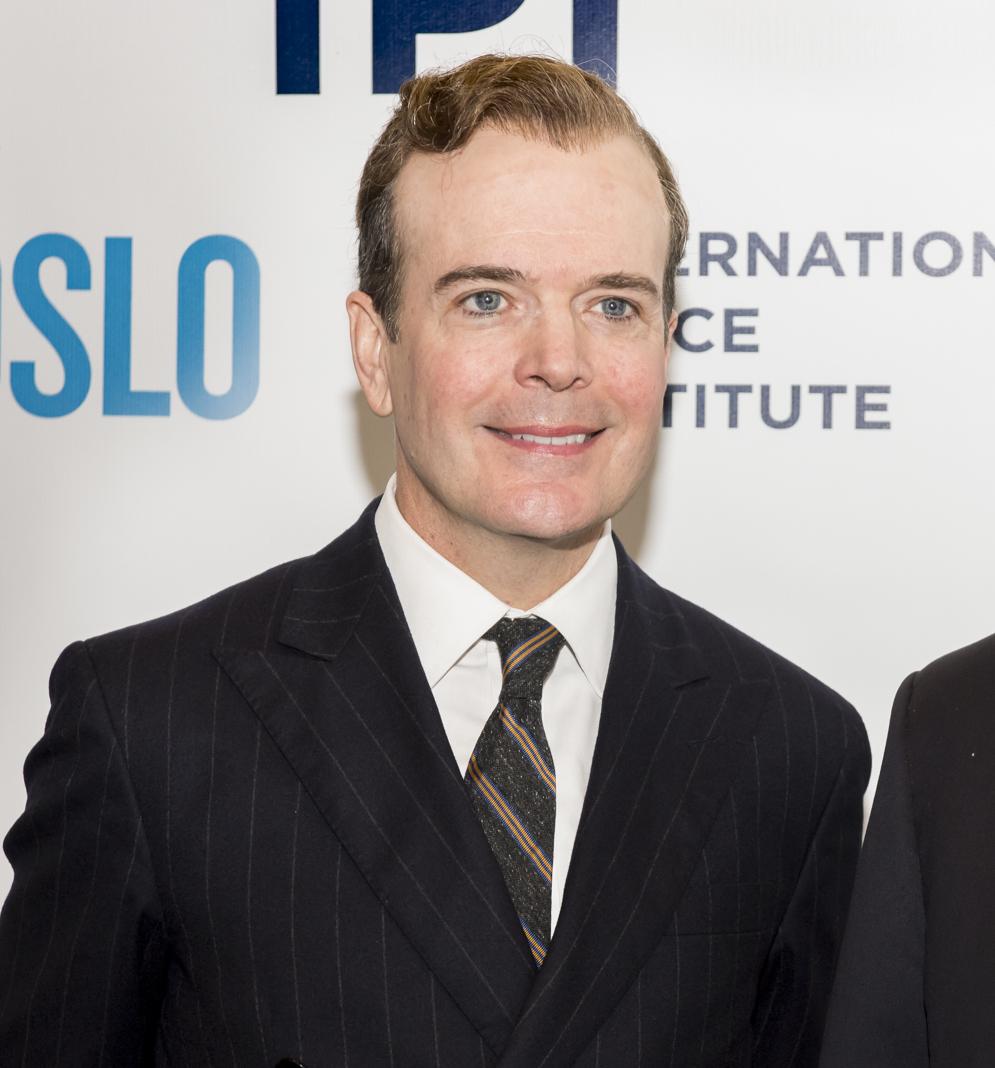
- Mays at International Peace Institute
- Born: Lewis Jefferson Mays; June 8, 1965 (age 61); New London, Connecticut, U.S.
- Education: Yale University (BA); University of California, San Diego (MFA)
- Occupation: Actor
- Years active: 1988–present
- Spouse: Susan Lyons (m. 2003)

Lewis Jefferson Mays (born June 8, 1965) is an American actor. He is the recipient of numerous accolades, including a Tony Award, a Helen Hayes Award, a Lucille Lortel Award, two Drama Desk Awards, two Outer Critics Circle Awards and three Obie Awards.

== Life and career ==
Mays was raised in Clinton, Connecticut, with his parents, a naval intelligence officer and a children's librarian, and his siblings. Mays graduated from Yale College, where he received a Bachelor of Arts degree, and the University of California, San Diego, where he earned a Master of Fine Arts from the graduate acting program. He appeared at La Jolla Playhouse, Long Wharf Theatre, the Williamstown Theatre Festival, and Playwrights Horizons.

Mays appeared on Broadway in I Am My Own Wife, a Pulitzer Prize-winning play by Doug Wright, from November 2003 (previews) to October 31, 2004. He had appeared in the play Off-Broadway at Playwrights Horizons in May 2003, and at the La Jolla Playhouse in July 2001. Mays won the 2004 Tony Award for Best Performance by a Leading Actor in a Play, the 2004 Drama Desk Award for Outstanding One-Person Show, an Obie Award, and a 2004 Theatre World Award for his solo performance. He also won the 2007 Helpmann Award for Best Male Actor in a Play for seasons of I Am My Own Wife in Australia in 2006.

Mays starred in two Broadway revivals in 2007. He appeared as Henry Higgins in Pygmalion, in which he won critical praise. The TheaterMania reviewer called him "pitch-perfect", and the production an "excellent revival". He appeared in a revival of Journey's End in February to June 2007, in which he starred as Private Mason. Ben Brantley, in The New York Times, called the production "acutely staged and acted." The TheaterMania reviewer wrote: "Mays is a reliable, obliging Mason."

In August 2009, Mays appeared at the Williamstown Theatre Festival in Quartermaine's Terms by Simon Grey.

Mays starred in the 2013 Broadway musical A Gentleman's Guide to Love and Murder, in which he played nine roles. He performed in the musical from October 2013 (previews) until closing on January 17, 2016. He won the Outer Critics Circle Award for Outstanding Actor in a Musical. He was nominated for the Tony Award for Best Performance by a Leading Actor in a Musical and tied for the Drama Desk Award for Outstanding Actor in a Musical (with Neil Patrick Harris). Mays played Terje Rød-Larsen in the Broadway play Oslo, for which he received a Tony Award for Best Actor in a Play nomination. Mays played Mayor George Shinn in the 2022 Broadway revival of The Music Man.

Mays also narrates audiobooks, including The Expanse series, The Invention of Sound by Chuck Palahniuk and Flow My Tears, the Policeman Said. His narration was recognized by an Audie Award and a number of Earphones Awards.

Mays has appeared in several television programs as well; he notably appeared in several episodes of Law & Order: Special Victims Unit as cross-dressing murderer Carl Rudnick, and as Black Dahlia suspect George Hodel in the Turner Network Television miniseries I Am the Night. His television credits include Unbreakable Kimmy Schmidt, The Good Wife, Nurse Jackie, The Americans, and Hacks.

== Personal life ==
Mays is married to Australian actress Susan Lyons.

== Acting credits ==
=== Film ===
Year	Title	Role	Notes	Ref.
1993	Ghost Brigade	Martin Bradley		
1994	Some Folks Call It a Sling Blade	Gerry Woolridge	Short film	
1995	The Low Life	Hollywood Mogul		
1997	Hudson River Blues	Eric		
1998	Cousin Bette	Stidmann		
1999	The Big Brass Ring	Garne Strickland		
2004	Kinsey	Effete Man's Friend		
2004	Alfie	Dr. Miranda Kulp		
2005	The Notorious Bettie Page	Little John		
2006	Memoirs of My Nervous Illness	Daniel Schreber		
2008	How to Lose Friends & Alienate People	Bill Nathanson		
2014	The Giver	Community (voice)		
2014	Inherent Vice	Dr. Threeply		
2014	Ned Rifle	Dr. Ford		
2015	I Am Michael	Preacher Teacher		
2017	Rebel in the Rye	William Maxwell		
2018	The Ballad of Buster Scruggs	Gilbert Longabaugh	Segment: "The Gal Who Got Rattled"	
2021	The Tragedy of Macbeth	Doctor		
2025	Rebuilding	Mr. Cassidy		
2025	The Panic	Teddy Roosevelt		
2026	Los Vampires	George Wilmore		

=== Television ===
Year	Title	Role	Notes	Ref.
1988	Dynaman	Dynabeige (voice)		
1991	A Week in Joe's Basement	Alex	Episode: "Remote Control"	
1997	Liberty! The American Revolution	James Madison	6 episodes	
2002	Benjamin Franklin	Elkanah Watson	3 episodes	
2005	The Closer	Dr. Easton	Episode: "Fatal Retraction"	
2008	Law & Order: Criminal Intent	Keifer Gates	Episode: "Legacy"	
2009	Law & Order	Attorney Olsen	Episode: "Pledge"	
2009	Fringe	Nicholas Boone	Episode: "Midnight"	
2010	Nurse Jackie	Tim	Episode: "P.O. Box"	
2010	God in America	Jeremiah Moore	Episode: "A New Adam/A New Eden"	
2010	Lie to Me	Sidney Carlton	Episode: "Double Blind"	
2010	Detroit 1-8-7	Dr. Roger Kosowski	2 episodes	
2011	Mildred Pierce	Man in Blue Coat	Episode: "Four"	
2011	The Good Wife	Diplomat Van Buskirk	Episode: "Affairs of State"	
2012	My America	Performer	Episode: "Fire in Dreamland"	
2014–2016	Law & Order: Special Victims Unit	Dr. Carl Rudnick	7 episodes	
2015	The Americans	Walter Taffet	4 episodes	
2015	The Knick	Attorney Whitting	Episode: "You're No Rose"	
2015–2016	Unbreakable Kimmy Schmidt	Daddy	2 episodes	
2019	I Am the Night	George Hodel	6 episodes	
2019	The Blacklist	Norman Devane	Episode: "Norman Devane (No. 138)"	
2020	Westworld	Liam Dempsey Sr.	Episode: "Genre"	
2020	Perry Mason	Virgil Sheets	5 episodes	
2021, 2026	Hacks	T.L. Gurley	2 episodes	
2022–2023	Julia	P. Albert Duhamel	8 episodes	

=== Theatre ===
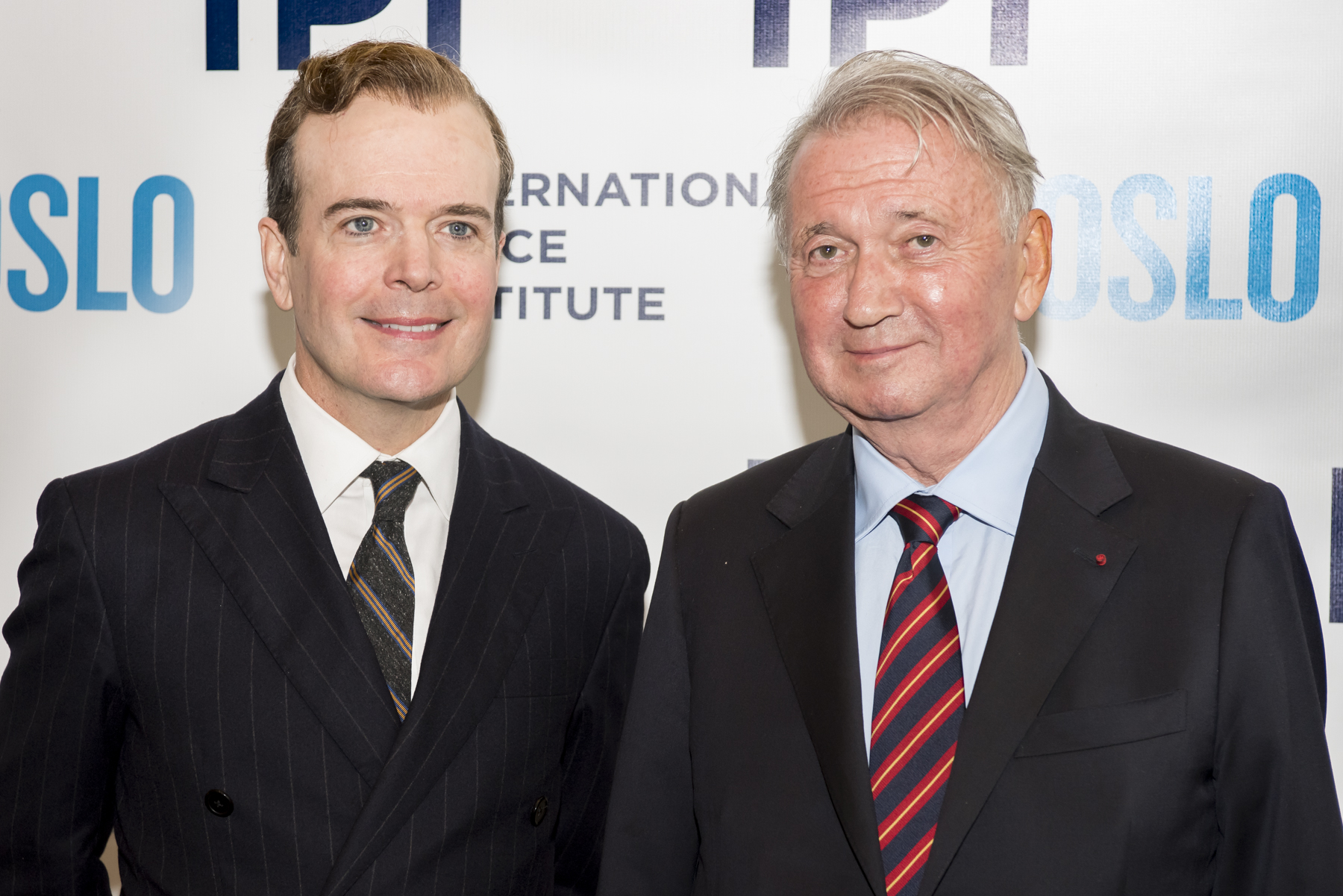
Jefferson Mays, who plays the part of Terje Rød-Larsen in Oslo, with International Peace Institute (IPI) President Terje Rød-Larsen, at a special performance of the play hosted by IPI.

Year	Title	Role	Venue	Ref.
1992	Bella, Belle of Byelorussia	Sergei/Vladivostok Jimmy	WPA Theatre, Off-Broadway	
1994	Moe's Lucky Seven	Mokie	Playwrights Horizons, Off-Broadway	
1995	Quills	Abbé de Coulmier	New York Theatre Workshop, Off-Broadway	
1998	Culture of Desire	Diana Vreeland	New York Theatre Workshop, Off-Broadway	
2000	Lydie Breeze, Parts I & II	Jeremiah Grady	New York Theatre Workshop, Off-Broadway	
2003	I Am My Own Wife	Charlotte von Mahlsdorf, et al.	Playwrights Horizons, Off-Broadway	
2003	I Am My Own Wife	Charlotte von Mahlsdorf, et al.	Lyceum Theatre, Broadway	
2007	Journey's End	Private Mason	Belasco Theatre, Broadway	
2007	Pygmalion	Henry Higgins	American Airlines Theatre, Broadway	
2010	Measure for Measure	Duke Vincentio	The Duke on 42nd Street, Off-Broadway	
2011	Blood and Gifts	Simon Craig	Mitzi E. Newhouse Theatre, Off-Broadway	
2012	The Best Man	Sheldon Marcus	Gerald Schoenfeld Theatre, Broadway	
2012	A Gentleman's Guide to Love and Murder	The D'Ysquith Family	Hartford Stage	
2013	A Gentleman's Guide to Love and Murder	The D'Ysquith Family	Old Globe Theatre	
2013	A Gentleman's Guide to Love and Murder	The D'Ysquith Family	Walter Kerr Theatre, Broadway	
2016	Oslo	Terje Rød-Larsen	Mitzi E. Newhouse Theatre, Off-Broadway	
2016	The Front Page	Roy V. Bensinger	Broadhurst Theatre, Broadway	
2017	Oslo	Terje Rød-Larsen	Vivian Beaumont Theater, Broadway	
2018	A Christmas Carol	Various Characters	Geffen Playhouse	
2021	The Music Man	Mayor George Shinn	Winter Garden Theatre, Broadway	
2022	A Christmas Carol	Various Characters	Nederlander Theatre, Broadway	
2026	Amadeus	Antonio Salieri	Pasadena Playhouse, Pasadena, CA	
2026	The Visit	Anton Schill	Pasadena Playhouse, Pasadena, CA	

== Awards ==
Year	Award	Category	Nominated work	Result	Ref.
2004	Tony Award	Best Actor in a Play	I Am My Own Wife	Won	
2004	Drama Desk Award	Outstanding Solo Performance	I Am My Own Wife	Won	
2004	Theatre World Award	—N/a	I Am My Own Wife	Won	
2004	Outer Critics Circle Award	Outstanding Solo Performance	I Am My Own Wife	Won	
2012	Drama Desk Award	Outstanding Featured Actor in a Play	Blood and Gifts	Nominated	
2012	Outer Critics Circle Award	Best Featured Actor in a Play	Blood and Gifts	Nominated	
2014	Tony Award	Best Actor in a Musical	A Gentleman's Guide to Love and Murder	Nominated	
2014	Drama Desk Award	Outstanding Actor in a Musical	A Gentleman's Guide to Love and Murder	Won	
2014	Outer Critics Circle Award	Outstanding Actor in a Musical	A Gentleman's Guide to Love and Murder	Won	
2017	Tony Award	Best Actor in a Play	Oslo	Nominated	
2017	Drama League Award	Distinguished Performance	Oslo	Nominated	
