= I Am the Night (TV series) =

- Promotional artwork
- Created by: Sam Sheridan
- Based on: One Day She'll Darken by Fauna Hodel
- Directed by: Patty Jenkins; Victoria Mahoney; Carl Franklin
- Starring: Chris Pine; India Eisley; Jefferson Mays; Leland Orser; Yul Vazquez; Justin Cornwell; Dylan Smith; Golden Brooks; Jay Paulson; Connie Nielsen
- Composer: David Lang
- Country of origin: United States
- Original language: English
- No. of seasons: 1
- No. of episodes: 6

Production
- Executive producers: Patty Jenkins; Chris Pine; Carl Franklin; Michael Sugar; Sam Sheridan
- Producers: Wayne Carmona; Dasith Gamage
- Production locations: Los Angeles, California
- Cinematography: Matthew Jensen; Trevor Forrest; Michael McDonough
- Editors: Dody Dorn; Mark Yoshikawa
- Running time: 49–54 minutes
- Production companies: Studio T; Jenkins+Pine Productions

Original release
- Network: TNT
- Release: January 27 – March 4, 2019

I Am the Night is an American biographical period crime drama limited television series created and written by Sam Sheridan, and starring Chris Pine and India Eisley. Set in 1965, it focuses on Fauna Hodel, an adopted teenager who uncovers the truth behind her maternal ancestry, specifically her connection to her grandfather George Hodel, a renowned physician and suspect in the Black Dahlia murder. It is loosely based on Fauna Hodel's memoir, One Day She'll Darken (2008). Jefferson Mays, Connie Nielsen, Leland Orser, Yul Vazquez, Jay Paulson, and Golden Brooks appear in supporting roles.

The series premiered on TNT on January 28, 2019, with a sneak peek of the first episode airing on January 27, 2019. A companion true-crime podcast, Root of Evil: The True Story of the Hodel Family and the Black Dahlia was released in February 2019.

== Plot ==
Fauna Hodel, a young girl given up by her birth mother, sets out to uncover the secrets of her past and ends up following a sinister trail that swirls closer to a gynecologist involved in the Black Dahlia slaying.

== Cast ==
- Chris Pine as Jay Singletary, a disgraced LA-based journalist and Korean War veteran who encounters Fauna Hodel as he investigates her grandfather, George Hodel.
- India Eisley as Fauna Hodel, who has grown up believing she is biracial but begins investigating the truth about her biological parents.
- Jefferson Mays as George Hodel, Fauna's grandfather, a prominent, powerful, and dangerous LA-based physician who was a suspect in the Black Dahlia murder.
- Connie Nielsen as Corinna Hodel, George Hodel's now divorced second wife.
- Leland Orser as Peter Sullivan, Jay Singletary's editor and mentor.
- Yul Vazquez as Billis, an LAPD sergeant detective known for his brutal tactics.
- Jay Paulson as Ohls, an LAPD detective and a Korean War vet who owes his life to Jay Singletary.
- Golden Brooks as Jimmie Lee Greenwade, Fauna's adoptive mother who has kept Fauna's origins secret from her.
- Theo Marshall as Detective Cuddy.
- Jamie Anne Allman as Tamar Hodel, George Hodel's daughter and Fauna's birth mother.
- Monique Green as Nina, Fauna's cousin.
- Shoniqua Shandai as Tina, Fauna's cousin who warns her about investigating her white family.
- Justin Cornwell as Terrence Shye, a friend of the Lee family who takes a romantic interest in Fauna.
- Dylan Smith as Sepp, George Hodel's right-hand man.

== Episodes ==
No.	Title	Directed by	Written by	Original release date	U.S. viewers (millions)
1	"Pilot"	Patty Jenkins	Sam Sheridan	January 27, 2019 (Note: A sneak peek of the pilot aired on January 27, 2019, before the premiere of the pilot in its regular timeslot on January 28, 2019.)	0.898
Stringer journalist Jay Singletary takes demeaning assignments in Los Angeles to the point where he is suicidal. Meanwhile, Pat Allman, a biracial teenager in Sparks, Nevada, is taunted at school. Her alcoholic mother, Jimmie Lee, tries to protect Pat but arouses suspicions about her origins. Pat learns from a birth certificate hidden by Jimmie Lee, who then confirms it, that she is Fauna Hodel who was placed for adoption by her birth mother. Pat contacts her biological grandfather, Dr. George Hodel, who invites her to Los Angeles. Despite believing that Pat could have a better future there, Jimmie Lee calls Jay to have him renew his interest in George Hodel who was the subject of an article Jay wrote decades ago which caused his credibility to suffer.
2	"Phenomenon of Interference"	Patty Jenkins	Sam Sheridan	February 4, 2019	1.16
Fauna arrives in Los Angeles and attempts to track down members of her family. She goes to the Hodel residence and meets Corinna Hodel who takes Fauna out for the day, but she also states that Fauna is not of mixed race. Meanwhile, Jay continues to work on a story involving a gruesome murder, but is still fixated on his earlier story involving the doctor George Hodel and Fauna.
3	"Dark Flower"	Victoria Mahoney	Sam Sheridan	February 11, 2019	1.13
The episode begins with a flashback to 1945 where Hodel hosts a debauched party wearing a bizarre mask watched by Tamar. Back in the present, Sepp catches up with Fauna, but she manages to escape from him. Meanwhile, Jay is picked up and interrogated by LAPD Sergeant Billis who threatens violence, but Jay is saved by the intervention of Detective Ohls, a co-survivor of Dog Company in the Korean War. Fauna sneaks into Corinne's house to find a return address from Tamar on a piece of mail postmarked last week. Jay sees her escape out a window and takes her to a diner, where he tries to get information from her, but she gives him the slip. Fauna returns home to learn that Nero, a teenager who's been calling her, was murdered. She leaves the house with her new friend Terrence Shye, who lets her sleep on his couch and call Jimmie Lee.
4	"Matador"	Victoria Mahoney	Sam Sheridan	February 18, 2019	1.01
Fauna and Terence investigate the scene of Nero's death and a homeless man refers to a black Buick that Fauna suspects is the one that has been following her. When they return Fauna finds an invitation to a "happening" and decides to attend. She arrives and finds a bizarre scene with people dressed theatrically and strange exhibits, including one of Corinna reclining in a gown from which people proceed to cut pieces. Fauna later talks with Corinna, who divulges nothing, although Fauna learns Tamar lives in Hawaii from Corinne's address book. As Fauna leaves, Sepp knocks her out and prepares to do serious harm to her, but Jay suddenly appears and tackles him, and, after a short, brutal fight, fatally stabs him. Jay is immobilized by his own actions, but Fauna spurs him into disposing of the body and weapon. Fauna offers that if Jay can find out who Sepp was, she will reveal Tamar's address. Jay realizes that Fauna knows little of the Hodels and his abortion clinic, but they agree to cooperate. Later, Jay visits an exhibition and enters a room filled with surrealist pieces that belong to Dr. Hodel. Jay realizes that the works depicting pieces of women's bodies are the inspiration for the murders he is investigating and that the killings were not done out of hate.
5	"Aloha"	Carl Franklin	Monica Beletsky	February 25, 2019	1.11
Jay manages to convince his editor Peter Sullivan to pay for him and Fauna to fly to Hawaii and she leaves with him against the protests of the visiting Jimmie Lee. Once there, they begin their search for Tamar whom they eventually find in the countryside. Fauna finally learns from Tamar the truth about her birth, that she is a product of an incestuous relationship between Tamar and George. Tamar lied about her father being black because she said that she never knew any white people she could trust. Later, Jay meets with Tamar, who shows him paintings George Hodel sent her. They are of women he is suspected of killing and also provides evidence of George's involvement in the Black Dahlia murder. When they return to Los Angeles, Jay and Fauna find that the city has erupted in racial violence. Jay arranges to meet Sullivan but finds that his mentor has sold him out to Billis and the LAPD who arrest him for probing into the activities of George Hodel. Meanwhile, Hodel arrives in Sparks and stabs Jimmie Lee.
6	"Queen's Gambit, Accepted"	Carl Franklin	Sam Sheridan	March 4, 2019	1.15
Fauna learns that Jimmie Lee is in hospital and visits Corinna to ask for a loan to buy a bus ticket to Nevada. However, Corinna offers her some spiked lemonade, which knocks her out and Corinna hands her over to George Hodel. At the police station, Jay is severely beaten and warned to stop his investigation. Jay appeals to Billis' sense of justice then offers to kill Hodel and take the fall himself to free Billis from Hodel's connections and influence in LA. Billis arranges police transport and slips Jay a key to his handcuffs which he uses to escape. Fauna wakes in Hodel's house to learn that she has become his next art project and victim. She manages to incapacitate him and flee just as Jay arrives to kill him. Hodel escapes, so Jay and Fauna go their separate ways to protect each other. Fauna returns to being Jimmie Lee's daughter back in Sparks and Jay retires to Hawaii, fighting his inner demons. Still suffering from his injuries, Hodel escapes to the Philippines and sets up house there.

== Production ==
=== Development ===
On July 27, 2017, the US cable network TNT announced Chris Pine would play the role of Jay Singletary in a six-episode television drama, One Day She'll Darken, and serve as an executive producer alongside director Patty Jenkins and writer Sam Sheridan. The drama was inspired by the autobiography of Fauna Hodel titled One Day She'll Darken: The Mysterious Beginnings of Fauna Hodel. In late 2017, it was reported that Carl Franklin would direct two episodes and also serve as executive producer. Victoria Mahoney will also direct two episodes. Director of photography Matthew Jensen joined the project in November 2017. The series was renamed I Am the Night and while originally announced to premiere on January 28, 2019, a sneak peek full airing of the pilot would be scheduled to follow 25th Screen Actors Guild Awards on the night before.

=== Casting ===
On October 13, 2017, TNT announced that India Eisley, Jefferson Mays, Yul Vazquez, Justin Cornwell, Dylan Smith, Theo Marshall, Jay Paulson, and Golden Brooks had joined the cast. Leland Orser, Connie Nielsen, Shoniqua Shandai, and Monique Green were also later cast.

=== Marketing ===
TNT released the first trailer of the show on July 2, 2018.

The premiere was screened at the American Film Institute's AFI Fest on November 9, 2018, at the Egyptian Theatre in Los Angeles, California.

== Reception ==
On review aggregator Rotten Tomatoes, the series holds an approval rating of 73% based on 70 reviews, with an average rating of 6.34/10. The website's critical consensus reads, "Chris Pine inhabits I Am the Night with the roguish gravitas befitting a noir — even if this entry into the pulp genre is more straightforward and languidly paced than some viewers would like." On Metacritic, it has a weighted average score of 59 out of 100, based on 26 critics, indicating "mixed or average reviews".

=== Accolades ===
Award	Date of ceremony	Category	Recipient(s) and nominee(s)	Result	Ref.
Satellite Awards	2020	Best Actor in a Miniseries or TV Film	Chris Pine	Nominated	
Satellite Awards	2020	Best Actress in a Miniseries or TV Film	India Eisley	Nominated	

== See also ==
- Root of Evil: The True Story of the Hodel Family and the Black Dahlia
