= Linda Kenney Baden =

American lawyer

Linda Kenney Baden (born 1953) is an American lawyer, former prosecutor and private defense attorney.

== Career ==
Kenney Baden graduated from Rutgers Law School. She has participated in a number of high-profile cases including the trials of Phil Spector, Jayson Williams, Casey Anthony, Michael Skakel, Aaron Hernandez, and Harvey Weinstein.

== Media ==
Baden is an on-air host for the Law & Crime Network and contributor to the Huffington Post. She has also appeared on Poker Night in America, and participated in the World Series of Poker.

She is married to Michael Baden, a forensic pathologist, and together they authored Remains Silent: A Novel and Skeleton Justice.
