= Kill Bill Vol. 2 (soundtrack) =

2004 soundtrack album

Kill Bill Vol. 2 Original Soundtrack

Soundtrack album to Kill Bill: Volume 2 by Various artists
- Released: April 13, 2004
- Recorded: 2003 – 2004
- Genres: Alternative rock; film score; rockabilly; flamenco; outlaw country; Latin rock; enka; hip hop
- Length: 46:12
- Languages: English; Spanish; Japanese
- Label: Maverick
- Producers: Quentin Tarantino; RZA; Robert Rodriguez

Professional ratings
Review scores
| Source | Rating |
|---|---|
| Allmusic | 3/5 stars |

Kill Bill Vol. 2 Original Soundtrack is the soundtrack to the 2004 film Kill Bill: Volume 2. Released on April 13, 2004, it reached #58 on the Billboard 200 and #2 on the Billboard soundtracks chart in the US. It also reached the ARIA Top 50 album charts in Australia. It was orchestrated by Tarantino's fellow filmmaker and personal friend Robert Rodriguez, as well as RZA from the Wu-Tang Clan.

== Development ==
Robert Rodriguez was hired by Tarantino to score the film. Rodriguez did it as a favour for his friend, Tarantino, asking to be paid one dollar for his work. Tarantino repaid this favour by directing a scene of Rodriguez's Sin City for the same fee. RZA said of the soundtrack:

"With Kill Bill I did score and songs, meaning that we put a lot of songs in [the movie] from old collections of records and I composed music for some scenes, natural music. When we did Kill Bill 2, you know, we brought Robert Rodriguez in. Check this out, he took my music and he kept the foundation there, though. With Robert he didn't want to remove any of the electronic [sounds]. He said 'No.' I was like 'Take out all the electronic stuff, you know, so it can be [more like a traditional score].' He said 'No, man. I like the electronic stuff. This is the reason I wanted to do this.' So he took the electronic stuff and kept it there, then built the orchestrations on top of it, you know what I mean?"

== Track listing ==
| No. | Title | Writer(s) | Artist(s) | Length |
|---|---|---|---|---|
| 1. | "A Few Words from the Bride" (Dialogue) | | Uma Thurman | 0:42 |
| 2. | "Goodnight Moon" | Ambrosia Parsley; Duke McVinnie | Shivaree | 4:03 |
| 3. | "Il tramonto (Note: Originally from the 1966 film The Good, the Bad and the Ugly)" | Ennio Morricone | Ennio Morricone | 1:15 |
| 4. | "Can't Hardly Stand It" | Charlie Feathers; Jerry Huffman; Jo Chastain | Charlie Feathers | 2:48 |
| 5. | "Tu Mirá"" (Edit) | Jose Manuel Flores; Manuel Molina Jimenez | Lole y Manuel | 4:00 |
| 6. | "Summertime Killer (Note: Originally from the 1972 film The Summertime Killer)" | Luis Bacalov | Luis Bacalov | 3:39 |
| 7. | "The Chase (Note: Originally from the 1970 film Road to Salina)" | Alan Reeves; Phil Steele; Philip Brigham | Alan Reeves, Phil Steele, and Philip Brigham | 1:03 |
| 8. | "The Legend of Pai Mei" (Dialogue) | | David Carradine and Uma Thurman | 2:06 |
| 9. | "L'arena (Note: Originally from the 1968 film The Mercenary)" | Morricone | Ennio Morricone | 4:46 |
| 10. | "A Satisfied Mind" | Joe "Red" Hayes; Jack Rhodes | Johnny Cash | 2:50 |
| 11. | "A Silhouette of Doom (Note: Originally from the 1966 film Navajo Joe)" | Morricone | Ennio Morricone | 2:54 |
| 12. | "About Her (Note: Samples vocals from The Zombies' song "She's Not There" and Bessie Smith's song "St. Louis Blues" from the 1929 film of the same name)" | Malcolm McLaren; Rod Argent; W. C. Handy | Malcolm McLaren | 4:49 |
| 13. | "Truly and Utterly Bill" (Dialogue) | | David Carradine and Uma Thurman | 0:47 |
| 14. | "Malagueña Salerosa" | Elpidio Ramirez; Pedro Galindo | Chingon | 4:05 |
| 15. | "Urami Bushi (Note: Originally from the 1973 film Female Prisoner Scorpion: 701's Grudge Song)" (怨み節; "Grudge Song") | Shunsuke Kikuchi; Shunya Itō | Meiko Kaji | 3:33 |
| Total length: | | | | 46:12 |

Hidden track
| No. | Title | Writer(s) | Artist(s) | Length |
|---|---|---|---|---|
| 16. | "Black Mamba" | Wu-Tang Clan | Wu-Tang Clan | 2:38 |

== Not included ==
Numerous noteworthy tracks used in the film and to advertise it were not included in the soundtrack album:

- Nora Orlandi's "Dies Irae" — used in the conversation between Bill and Budd.
- "Ay Que Caray" by Marilu Esmeralda Aguiluz — source music in the strip club.
- "Budd's Trailer Suspicions" — original, incidental music by Robert Rodriguez, heard when The Bride lurks around Budd's trailer.
- "A Fistful of Dollars (Version 2)" by Ennio Morricone, from A Fistful of Dollars — heard as Budd spits on the bride and injects her with tranquilizers.
- "Il mercenario (ripresa)" by Ennio Morricone, from the film The Mercenary — heard as The Bride escapes from the coffin.
- "Pai Mei Theme" — original incidental music by Robert Rodriguez; heard as The Bride ascends the stairs to Pai Mei's temple.
- "Title Theme from Three Tough Guys" by Isaac Hayes — used for the Bride/Pai Mei fight training sequence.
- "Invincible Pole Fighter" by Sho Chun Hou & Stephen Shing; used for The Bride's training montage with Pai Mei.
- "Sunny Road to Salina" performed by Christophe and composed by Bernard Girard, from the film Road to Salina — used for The Bride's march through the desert, frequently used in Kill Bill ads.
- The "Budd Twang" — original guitar piece by Robert Rodriguez, one version heard after Budd shoots the Bride, another when Elle is about to escape with the cash.
- "Bang Bang" (original song by Sonny and Cher) variation after Budd drugs the Bride, first done in a slower pace, followed by a Spaghetti Western style variation.
- "I giorni dell'ira" (Days of Anger) by Riz Ortolani — When Elle does a mid air kick toward the Bride with sound effects.
- "The Demise of Barbara and the Return of Joe" by Ennio Morricone, from Navajo Joe, used for the death of Bill.
- "Il Triello" by Ennio Morricone, from The Good, the Bad and the Ugly, used in the trailer.

== Certifications and sales ==
| Region | Certification | Certified units/sales |
|---|---|---|
| France (SNEP) | Gold | 100,000^{*} |
| Hungary (MAHASZ) | Gold | 10,000^{^} |
| United Kingdom (BPI) | Silver | 60,000^{^} |
| United States | — | 196,000 |
^{*} Sales figures based on certification alone.^{^} Shipments figures based on certification alone.

== See also ==
- Kill Bill Vol. 1 (soundtrack)
