= Osvaldo Ribó =

Argentine tango singer (1927–2015)

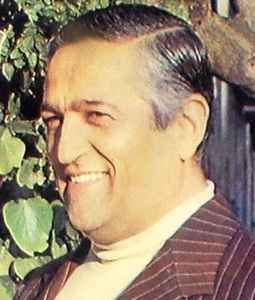
- Osvaldo Ribó

Background information
- Born: Andrés Bartolomé Osuna; 30 November 1927; Victoria, Entre Ríos, Argentina
- Origin: Argentina
- Died: 19 April 2015 (aged 87) Mar del Plata, Argentina
- Occupations: Singer, guitarist
- Instrument: Voice
- Spouse: Alma Joy Hussey (1950–) (separated)

Andrés Bartolomé Osuna (30 November 1927 – 19 April 2015), better known by his stage name Osvaldo Ribó, was an Argentine tango singer. He was the father of Argentine-British actress Olivia Hussey (1951–2024) and the grandfather of American actress India Eisley.

== Life ==
=== Early years ===
Ribó was born with the name Andrés Bartolomé Osuna, in the city of Victoria, province of Entre Ríos, Argentina. He was the sixth of ten siblings. His passion for music and singing awakened at an early age.

Ribó attended primary school in the city of Rosario, province of Santa Fe, which was the second most important center of tango in Argentina. One day, the school principal heard him singing in the kitchen of the building and asked him why he had moved from Victoria, and the boy replied, "Because I wanted to sing." The principal—who played the piano and the violin—decided to try the boy out in the school choir, which had 60 children.

=== Professional career ===
As a young teenager, Ribó made his debut as a tango singer on a radio station in Rosario, accompanied by guitars, and joined a cabaret orchestra where the violinist Nito Farace played and whose conductor, Lincoln Garrot, imitated the style of Osvaldo Fresedo.

In 1944, Ribó began using the pseudonym "Julio Lucero." He performed at the Sans Souci cabaret with Alfredo Gobbi's orchestra.

Ribó was a singer with Antonio Arcieri's group, with whom he performed in several cabarets. He later became the singer for the sextet Dalepi (a shortened form of the Greek surname of bandoneon player Armando Dalepidote), with whom he performed at a venue called Hurlingham, across from the Novel café on Lavalle Street.

When the singer Enrique Campos left Ricardo Tanturi’s orchestra, the bandleader began auditioning a large number of candidates. Tanturi was looking for voices with personality and for that reason he chose Ribó. As part of a contest proposed by the sponsor of the radio program where Tanturi performed, listeners suggested the stage name for the newly joined singer. That's how the pseudonym "Osvaldo Ribó" came about.

On 27 August 1946, Ribó made his recording debut with the Victor label alongside Ricardo Tanturi's orchestra, recording the tango Sombras by Pracánico and Servetto, and on the reverse side, Una lágrima by Verona and Cárdenas. From that moment on, he became Tanturi's singer, sharing vocal duties with Roberto Videla and taking the place left in the orchestra by the Uruguayan singer Enrique Campos. Alma de bohemio, Remembranza, Vagabundo, and Ana Lucía were some of the works that defined his four years with Tanturi.

Ribó's first recording was a duet with Roberto Videla on 16 August 1946, the waltz Amores de estudiante, having recorded 14 tracks with Tanturi. His greatest success was, and continues to be, the tango Papel picado, by Cátulo Castillo and José González Castillo.

From 1954, Ribó worked with Lorenzo Barbero's orchestra, with whom he recorded two tangos: Noche de locura (July 23, 1954) and No quiero verte llorar (May 20, 1955).

In 1960, Ribó worked with bandoneon player Ángel Domínguez. That same year, he recorded Aquel nocturno with the orchestra of Héctor Gondre, the bandoneonist of Ricardo Tanturi.

Afterwards, Ribó joined Mariano Mores’s orchestra, with whom he had "a bad experience," according to his own words. He also performed on television.

Ribó continued performing, always as a soloist, in various venues, recording some tracks. In 1978, accompanied by the important tango guitarist Roberto Grela and his guitarists, he recorded four tracks. Later, there was a series of recordings he disowned, only released on cassette—eight tracks with the orchestra directed by Ricardo Martínez in 1987.

In his last work, recorded in 1999 and released by Héctor Lucci, he recorded twelve tracks accompanied by the guitars of Hugo Rivas and the four tracks recorded with Roberto Grela in 1978 were reissued.

On 14 May 2008, a tribute was held for him at the traditional Café Tortoni, in Buenos Aires.

=== Personal life and death ===
In 1950, Ribó married the English legal secretary Alma Joy Hussey, who was living in Buenos Aires. They had two children, one of whom was the actress Olivia Hussey. In 1954, Ribó and his wife separated. In 1958, Alma Joy Hussey moved to London with their two children. Alma Joy Hussey died in 1989.

Olivia Hussey changed her paternal surname to her maternal one. When she became famous for starring in the film Romeo and Juliet (1968), she travelled to Argentina as a guest of the government. She said "I accepted because I wanted to see my dad."

Ribó died aged 87, in Mar del Plata on 19 April 2015.

Olivia Hussey died on 27 December 2024.

== Discography ==
In September 1999, Ribó recorded a CD called Papel picado.

1. Papel picado (tango), 2:20, by Cátulo Castillo and José González Castillo.
2. Shusheta (tango), 2:10, by Juan Carlos Cobián and Enrique Cadícamo.
3. Cortando camino (vals), 2:55, by Fausto Miguel Frontera and Enrique Cadícamo.
4. Tormento (tango), 2:30, by Charlo and Amadori.
5. Se llama mujer (tango), 2:20, by José Rial.
6. Seguime corazón (tango), 3:00, by Baldomero Suárez and Jesús Fernández Blanco.
7. Milonga que peina canas (milonga), 2:45, by Alberto Gómez.
8. A una mujer (vals), 2:55, by Horacio Salgán and Carmelo Volpe.
9. Equipaje (tango), 2:35, by Héctor María Artola and Carlos Bahr.
10. Guitarra mayor (tango), 2:30, by Osvaldo Ribó.
11. Bohardilla (tango), 2:35, by Arturo Blasi and Horacio Sanguinetti.
12. Alfred Arnold (tango), 2:45, by Gabriel Clausi and Hector Negro.
13. Una emoción (tango), 2:50, by Raúl Kaplún and José María Suñé.
14. No quiero verte llorar (tango), 2:25, by Agustín Magaldi and Rodolfo Sciammarella.
15. Temblando (vals), 3:00, by Alberto Hilarión Acuña and Gualberto Márquez-Charrúa.
16. Una lágrima (tango), 2:25, by Nicolás Verona and Eugenio Cárdenas.

From tracks 13 to 16, he is accompanied by guitarist Roberto Grela, and the rest of the songs feature the guitars of Hugo Rivas.
