= Roberto Grela =

Argentine musician (1913–1992)

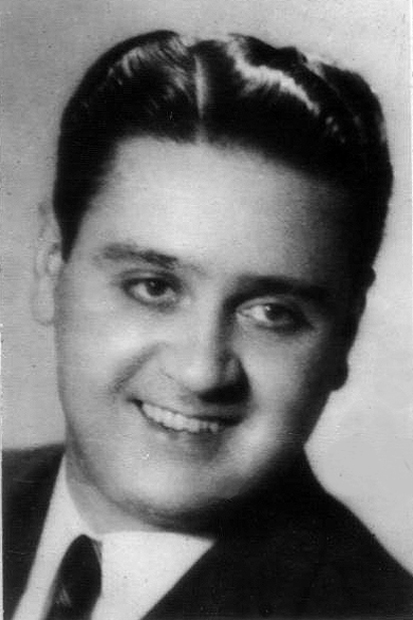
- Roberto Grela

Background information
- Born: Roberto León Grela; June 28, 1913; Buenos Aires, Argentina
- Died: September 6, 1992 (aged 79) Buenos Aires, Argentina
- Genres: Tango
- Occupations: Composer, guitarist
- Instrument: Guitar
- Years active: 1930–1992

Roberto Grela (28 June 1913 – 6 September 1992) was an Argentine tango guitarist and composer. Many consider him the best tango guitarist.

== Professional career ==
He was born at 773 Cochabamba Street, in the San Telmo neighborhood (at that time a poor neighborhood south of downtown Buenos Aires), with the name Roberto León Grela. His father and uncle formed the duo Los Hermanos Belpasso.

Grela learned to play the mandolin at gatherings in the home of his uncles Octavio and Juan, which were also frequented by the guitarist Manuel Parada, who—when Grela was seven years old—convinced him to start playing the guitar (instead of the mandolin, which he liked more).

In 1930, at the age of seventeen, he began playing the guitar professionally, accompanying Roberto Maida on radio LR3, and later also worked with Charlo (with whom he also performed in Montevideo, at the Justicia cinema).

During his long career, he accompanied many performers, including Jorge Casal, Osvaldo Cordó, Fernando Díaz, Agustín Irusta, Alberto Marino, Héctor Mauré, Nelly Omar, Alberto Podestá, Tito Reyes, Osvaldo Ribó, Edmundo Rivero, Alberto Serna, and Jorge Vidal.

In the early 1950s, he briefly ventured into Argentine folk music. He even had his own jazz group (which at the time was very popular at dances, along with tango) called Los American Fire. He also learned to play Brazilian music.

In 1953, the bandoneonist Aníbal Troilo brought him back to tango to accompany his bandoneon in the performance of the sainete El patio de la Morocha, by Cátulo Castillo, at the Enrique Santos Discépolo Theater (now the Alvear Theater).

His partnership with Aníbal Troilo gave tango history the most emotional side of Grela and the best of Troilo as a bandoneonist. But it was Grela who moved Troilo to give his very best. Later, he had a similar experience with Leopoldo Federico, and it became clear that it wasn't the same—something was missing: Troilo, despite Leopoldo’s superior technique. Troilo evoked in the guitarist a profound and deeply emotional atmosphere. They were spiritually in sync, in the words of Néstor Pinsón and Ricardo García Blaya.

He also formed the San Telmo Quartet with Leopoldo Federico and recorded albums for various record labels in Buenos Aires.

According to the poet Horacio Ferrer: "An artist of exquisite sensitivity and rare musical ability, he absorbed into his instrument the brilliant and fluid phrasing of the bandoneon tradition." He was self-taught and always played by ear. He was criticized for using a pick (a tortoiseshell plectrum) to play the guitar (he said that this was how he achieved the sound he liked).

In 1964, together with Edmundo Rivero (vocals), Enrique Mario Francini (violin), Horacio Salgán (piano), Enrique Kicho Díaz (double bass), Berlingieri (piano), Ciríaco Ortiz, and others, he led the show Tango, performed at the Teatro Colón, with Troilo as the central figure. Starting in 1966, he regularly worked at the Caño 14 bar on Uruguay Street.

He participated in the film Buenas noches, Buenos Aires, a musical movie directed in 1964 by Hugo del Carril. In 1974, he formed the group La Trova Porteña, together with Raúl Garello, Horacio Ferrer, and María Cristina Laurenz, at El Gallo Cojo, in the San Telmo neighborhood. In 1980, he joined the orchestra of Canal Once television (Buenos Aires), led by Osvaldo Requena.

In 1985, he received the Konex Award – Diploma of Merit as one of the 5 best tango instrumentalists of the decade in Argentina.

He composed, among others: Viejo baldío (lyrics by Víctor Lamanna), Callejón (lyrics by Héctor Marcó), and A San Telmo (in collaboration with Héctor Ayala), Las cuarenta (1939, lyrics by Francisco Gorrindo), Color gris, Amarga despedida, De punta y taco, Bendito (waltz with lyrics by Horacio Ferrer), Mi zambita rea (lyrics by Ferrer), Celedonio Bécquer (lyrics by Ferrer and Raúl Garello), Danzón de la chiflada (lyrics by Ferrer and Garello), Tristería (lyrics by Ferrer and Garello), and Serenata a mi guitarra.

Grela died in Buenos Aires on September 6, 1992, at the age of 79.

== Discography ==
Among his recordings with Troilo, the following can be highlighted:

- Nunca tuvo novio
- Mi refugio
- Sobre el pucho
- La Cachila
- Taconeando
- Palomita blanca

Among his recordings with Leopoldo Federico, the following can be highlighted:

- Romance de barrio
- Amigazo
- Amurado
- Tinta roja

== Films ==
- La Diosa impura (1963), directed by Armando Bó
- Buenas noches, Buenos Aires (1964), directed by Hugo del Carril
