= Andra Willis =

American singer (born 1943)

- Also known as: Andra Muhoberac, Andra Willis Muhoberac
- Born: August 27, 1943 (age 82); Danville, Virginia, US
- Occupation: Singer
- Years active: 1960s - ?
- Labels: Paramount, Capitol, MCA
- Formerly of: The Willis Sisters
- Spouse(s): Roy Kohn ? - ?, Larry Muhoberac 1976 - 2016 (his death)

Andra Willis (born August 27, 1943) is an American singer best known from television's The Lawrence Welk Show from 1967 to 1969.

== Background ==
Born and raised in Danville, Virginia. Andra began singing professionally with her sisters Toneda and Sheryl. Billed as the Willis Sisters, they started out locally with bands such as the Freddie Lee Orchestra and later guest starred on national television programs such as The Tonight Show and ironically, on Lawrence Welk's The Plymouth Show. Later, when the Willis Sisters split up, Andra became a solo vocalist, and was a frequent regular on Don McNeill's radio program, The Breakfast Club.

Since leaving the Welk organization, Andra has pursued a career as a studio session singer and a songwriter. She has worked on the soundtrack for the movie Lost Horizon where she supplied the vocals for Olivia Hussey in the songs, "Share the Joy" and "The Things I Will Not Miss".

== Career ==
=== 1960s ===
It was reported in the Spotlitems section of the 20 March 1965 issue of Record World that Andra Wills had written that wedding bells had broken up the Willis Sisters act. Both Sheryl and Andra were now married. Their youngest sister of the act, Tondea was doing her schoolwork via correspondence while hopeful that she could continue her acting and singing career. In the meantine, Andra was working as a secretary for Teddy Black at Robbins Music Corp. in New York. She was still singing on demo records for publishing companies and there was speculation that she may soon record a single.

For the weeks of 16 and 23 January 1967, Willis was appearing at the Breakfast Club.

In the Record Rambings section of Cash Box 25 November 1967, Wills whose picture was included was referred to as the "West Coast Girl of the Week". It was noted that Willis who had previously performed on the Breakfast Club, the Perry Como, Johnny Carson and Gary Moore Shows had now been signed on to the Lawrence Welk Show. While as a cast member of the Welk show from late 1967, and until her departure in 1969, she was featured as both a soloist and in duets with fellow Music Maker Dick Dale.

=== 1970s ===
Andra Wills recorded the song "Knock, Knock Who's There?" which was released on Paramount 0048 in 1970. A Record World Four Star Pick, it was reviewed in the magazine's 29 August 1970 issue. The readers were told to watch this one and the record was referred to as a delight. The Mary Hopkins style similarity was also noted. Along with "Poquito Soul" by One G Plus Three, it was actually one of the masters that the newly formed Los Angeles branch of Paramount Records, staffed by Ed Matthews and producers Tom Mack and Tim O'Brien had purchased. "Knock, Knock Who's There" became her only entry on the Billboard easy listening chart, reaching number 40.

Working with producers, Denny Diante and Jimmy Haskell, Willis recorded the Manzanero and Sunny Skylar composition, "I Adore You". Backed with "Walk a Little Bit Closer" it was released on Paramount PPA 0081 in 1971.

Willis' single, "Down Home Lovin' Woman" made its debut at no. 71 on the Record World Country Singles Chart for the week of 24 February 1973. At week six on the chart, the song peaked at no. 50 for the week of 31 March and held the position for one more week.

Along with Diana Lee, Suzy McCune, Suzy McCune, Jackie Ward and Sally Stevens, Andra Willis was one of the backing vocalists on Neil Diamond's Jonathan Livingston Seagull sound track album that was released in 1973.

Willis came 25th in the Billboard Country Special Chart Winners (Top Female Vocalists Singles section) for 1973.

== Personal life ==
It was reported by Mike Gross in the 11 July 1964 issue of Billboard that Roy Kohn, who was a radio and tv promo man at Southern Music had recently married Andra Willis. They had were married in New York on 28 May that year.

Today, since the late 1980s, Andra and her husband, musician and composer Larry Muhoberac make their home in Australia.
