= Autopsy (1975 film) =

1975 film

- Italian theatrical release poster
- Directed by: Armando Crispino
- Written by: Lucio Battistrada; Armando Crispino
- Produced by: Leo Pescarolo
- Starring: Mimsy Farmer
- Cinematography: Carlo Carlini
- Edited by: Daniele Alabiso
- Music by: Ennio Morricone
- Distributed by: Variety Distribution
- Release date: 1975
- Running time: 100 minutes
- Country: Italy
- Language: Italian

Autopsy (Italian: Macchie solari, lit. 'Sunspots'), also known as The Victim and Corpse) is a 1975 Italian giallo-horror film directed by Armando Crispino. It achieved cult status for its morgue scenes.

== Plot ==
Abnormal solar activity is believed to have driven the violent escalation of suicides in Rome. In a few examples, a woman cut her wrists in the bathroom, a man dove into a river with a plastic bag around his head, another man died in his car after setting it on fire, and a husband/father killed his family with a machine gun before turning it on himself. In the middle of the hectic work days at the coroner's office is Simona Sena, a resident pathologist who suffers so badly from the stress that she hallucinates the victims coming back to life. She's also sexually harassed regularly by assistant Ivo, as well as dates racing car driver Edgar Riccardo, who degrades and insults her and her job regularly and once solicited Ivo to play a cruel prank on Simona by pretending to be a corpse in the office, despite Simona not dumping him.

Betty Lennox, Simona's father Gianni's latest lover, meets Simona, who doesn't like her. The next morning, Betty is found dead on the beach, shot in her mouth in an apparent suicide. When she arrives at the morgue and is reconstructed by Ivo, after he molests her corpse, Simona recognizes her after placing a red wig on her, which Betty wore when Simona met her. Betty's brother, Catholic priest Father Paul Lennox, arrives to identify his sister in the morgue, revealing he absolved her in confession shortly before she was shot. He insists Betty was murdered and implores Simona to help him, but she rebuffs him at first.

Edgar recognizes Paul as a former race car driver who went off the tracks in his last race, killing a dozen people in a crash in the stands. Simona later meets Gianni, who tells her he's marrying his steady girlfriend Daniella, a controversial artist who Simona constantly fights with and who wears red wigs like Betty did. Simona goes up to Gianni's apartment above hers for answers, where she narrowly avoids a burglar looking for something, yet the burglar doesn't find what he's after.

Simona confronts Paul about his past, and when he fights her, he has a seizure, then later recovers. Simona finds the building super, who's a voyeur and abusive to his dog, having hanged himself in his bathroom with his dog's leash. Paul tries and fails to resuscitate him. Simona grows closer to Paul in spite of her relationship with Edgar, who wants to go to France with her. Paul reciprocates Simona's affection, but he refuses to give up his faith. Edgar, who refuses to believe Paul's assertions about Betty's murder, has Simona and Paul attend his next race. After Paul leaves, Edgar's car windshield blows out and he narrowly escapes his car going up in flames.

Gianni receives a suicide note from Betty, in an envelope Simona gave Betty, which is supposed to include a document, but there's nothing else with the note. Believing that his brother and business partner Lello stole the document, Gianni fights Lello. He's later severely paralyzed from a fall out the window, unable to speak and only able to blink. Paul confides in Simona that Betty played a prank on a man she cared about and Paul advised her to tell the man so as to make amends. Paul fears that his advice got Betty killed. In the meantime, Edgar enjoys toying with Simona, believing Paul is telling the truth, and as Paul's suspected of the crimes, Edgar insults Simona and even says she likely has some guilt over the attacks due to her declining sanity.

An experiment is conducted in the hospital on Gianni in which a special machine that reads his eye movements can allow him to spell out answers to questions regarding his fall. His answers are incoherent and he soon slips into a coma after someone deliberately tampered with his injection. This gives Simona an idea, and she finds a puncture mark on Betty, confirming that she was injected, then murdered. Ivo attacks Simona, forcing his hand up her uniform to aggressively molest her, but she nearly kills him with a fork, only to be stopped by Edgar. Paul is locked out of his own church and ordered to pack; as he collects his things he receives Betty's belongings, including an old Bible. He realizes that it's a historic document he believes was salvaged from disastrous floods in Florence decades earlier, and since Lello deals in antiques, he confronts Lello, who's near shooting Paul but relents. Paul assumes Lello stole the scripture to sell illegally with Gianni, making him a suspect.

Edgar, however, reveals the truth to his aunt, who doesn't hear him as she is almost deaf. Edgar is the killer, having sold his dead father's historic texts after shoving his father down a flight of stairs and killing him. The Bible was one of his father's items and contained his father's changed will, removing Edgar's inheritance. Gianni found it and blackmailed Edgar. Betty was hired to seduce Gianni and get the will back, but she wanted to mail the will back in her suicide note after speaking with Paul. Edgar stopped her and drugged her to hear the truth. He sent the note to Gianni and kept the will, shooting Betty as she had planned to do to herself. After Edgar broke into Gianni's apartment, Gianni shot at Edgar's car in a failed attempt to kill him. Edgar later shoved Gianni out his window to silence him.

Edgar confesses to Simona and Paul, then drugs them in an attempt to stage their shared suicide by carbon monoxide poisoning. Paul manages to turn on the tap, running the water in the bathroom to overflow out the apartment door, which alerts the dead super's dog. Once Simona and Paul are rescued, Paul confronts Edgar on the rooftop scaffolding he had set up and from which he photographs the skyline of Rome. Edgar tries to kill himself, along with Paul, by jumping from the scaffold. Paul saves himself but despite his best efforts Edgar loses his grip and plummets to his death in front of Simona, with the nearby public rushing to Edgar's body.

== Cast ==
- Mimsy Farmer as Simona Sana
- Barry Primus as Father Paul Lenox
- Ray Lovelock as Edgar
- Carlo Cattaneo as Lello Sana
- Angela Goodwin as Daniela
- Gaby Wagner as Betty Lenox
- Massimo Serato as Gianni Sana
- Ernesto Colli as Ivo
- Antonio Casale as Inspector Silvestri

== Critical reception ==
Allmovie wrote, "This creepy whodunit [...] offers a few chills but is ultimately unsatisfying."

Marco Giusti feels that the film, like all films by Crispino, is a little slow and boring.

Rob Talbot wrote "You really do wonder what you’ve let yourself [in] for when this one kicks off, but it’ll certainly make you sit up and pay attention, whether you love or hate it."
