= The Summertime Killer =

1972 film by Antonio Isasi-Isasmendi

- German poster
- Directed by: Antonio Isasi-Isasmendi
- Written by: Antonio Isasi-Isasmendi; Jorge Illa; Brian Degas
- Produced by: Antonio Isasi-Isasmendi
- Starring: Olivia Hussey; Karl Malden; Christopher Mitchum
- Cinematography: Juan Gelpí
- Edited by: Emilio Rodriguez; Ramon Quadreny
- Music by: Luis Enríquez Bacalov; Sergio Bardotti
- Distributed by: Isasi P.C. Embassy Pictures
- Release date: 1972
- Running time: 110 minutes
- Countries: Spain, Italy
- Language: English

The Summertime Killer (also known as Target Removed) is a 1972 crime film directed, produced and co-written by Antonio Isasi-Isasmendi and starring Christopher Mitchum, Olivia Hussey and Karl Malden, with Jeffrey Tambor in his film debut.

== Plot ==
A young boy witnesses four mobsters beating his father to death. Twenty years later, he sets out on a quest to eliminate all of the gang members involved in the murder. After killing three of them, Police Captain John Kiley (Karl Malden) informs the mob's boss that an unknown boy has begun killing his mob partners.

Kiley flies to Portugal and begins assembling the pieces of the puzzle. (Kiley and the mob boss had been partners in 1952, but turned to a vicious rivalry from opposing sides of the law.) With the help of a confidential informant, he finds out Raymond Castor (Christopher Mitchum) has kidnapped Alfredi's daughter, Tania (Olivia Hussey). He goes to Spain to find him and he discovers a garage where Raymond works. This sends Kiley to Torrejón, to talk with Raymond's business partner, another mechanic. He finds Raymond's apartment, at the "Torres Blancas" in the Avenida América de Madrid. Raymond's apartment is a treasure of information, but the only personal picture shows Raymond as a young boy on the beach with his parents.

Meanwhile, he and Tania, after a rocky start (she attempts numerous escapes and tries to kill him with a sharpened closet pole), begin to fall in love. On the day he confronts Alfredi, Raymond hesitates to shoot him, and it ends with one of Alfredi's bodyguards shooting Raymond, who steals a motorbike and tries to escape. An accident then kills Alfredi and everyone else.

Raymond returns to his house and finds Police Captain Kiley is there. He is arrested, but just for a short time. Raymond has lost considerable blood, and Tania takes care of him as best as she can. Kiley lets them both go, but Raymond does not understand why. Kiley answers: "You don't have to. Just keep going before I change my mind." They escape, and when Kiley returns to New York, mobsters-Alfredi's bodyguards-kill him.

== Cast ==
- Christopher Mitchum as Raymond Sullivan Castor
- Karl Malden as Captain John Kiley
- Olivia Hussey as Tania Scarlotti
- Claudine Auger as Michèle, Alfredi's Secretary
- Gérard Barray as Tania's Teacher
- Raf Vallone as Alfredi
- Gérard Tichy as Alex
- Jeffrey Tambor as "Sully" Tambor

== Home media ==
Wild East released the film on a limited edition R0 NTSC DVD alongside Confessions of a Police Captain in 2010.

== Pop culture ==
The film's theme "Summertime Killer" by Luis Enríquez Bacalov was used in the Kill Bill, Volume II soundtrack.
