= The Suspects (1974 film) =

- Directed by: Michel Wyn
- Written by: Paul Andréota; Michel Sales; Michel Wyn
- Produced by: Jacques Bar
- Starring: Mimsy Farmer; Paul Meurisse; Michel Bouquet
- Cinematography: Didier Tarot
- Edited by: Maryse Siclier
- Music by: François de Roubaix
- Production companies: Télécip; Cité Films
- Distributed by: Valoria Films
- Release date: 27 November 1974
- Running time: 90 minutes
- Countries: France; Italy
- Language: French

The Suspects (French: Les suspects) is a 1974 French-Italian crime drama film directed by Michel Wyn and starring Mimsy Farmer, Paul Meurisse and Michel Bouquet.

== Cast ==
- Mimsy Farmer as Candice Strasberg
- Paul Meurisse as Laurent Kirchner
- Michel Bouquet as Procureur Delarue
- Bruno Cremer as Commissaire Bonetti
- Michael Lonsdale as Le juge Souftries
- Jacques Fabbri as Commissaire Bretonnet
- Renaud Verley as Bernard Vauquier
- Jean-Claude Dauphin as Solnes
- Marie-Hélène Breillat as Carlyne
- Marco Perrin as Gabriel
- Giampiero Albertini as Matteo Gallone
- Luigi Pistilli as Marcello Angiotti
- Cirylle Spiga as Campanez
- Edmund Purdom as Le journaliste américain

== Bibliography ==
- Rège, Philippe. Encyclopedia of French Film Directors, Volume 1. Scarecrow Press, 2009.
