= The Track (1975 film) =

- French: La traque
- Directed by: Serge Leroy
- Written by: Andre G. Brunelin; Serge Leroy
- Produced by: Claire Duval; Edouard Garrouste; Eugene Lepicier
- Starring: Mimsy Farmer; Jean-Luc Bideau; Michael Lonsdale
- Cinematography: Claude Renoir
- Edited by: Francois Ceppi
- Music by: Giancarlo Chiaramello
- Release date: 14 May 1975 (France)

The Track (French: La traque) is a 1975 French thriller–drama film directed by Serge Leroy.

== Plot ==
A young Englishwoman moves to a French village, close to a university where she is to teach. She befriends a local man, who then introduces her to his friends, as they prepare for a wild pig hunt. During the hunt, three of the men encounter the young woman in an abandoned barn and two of them rape her. In the aftermath, she grabs a rifle from one of them and shoots him, before running off, determined to tell the police. The others, including her friend, track her through woods and farmland, to prevent her reaching safety and informing the police of their attack.

== Cast ==
- Mimsy Farmer as Helen Wells
- Jean-Luc Bideau as Philippe Mansart
- Jean-Pierre Marielle as Albert Danville
- Michael Lonsdale as David Sutter
- Michel Constantin as Capitaine Nimier
- Philippe Leotard as Paul Danville
- Michel Robin as Chamond
