= Mimsy Farmer =

American actress and sculptor

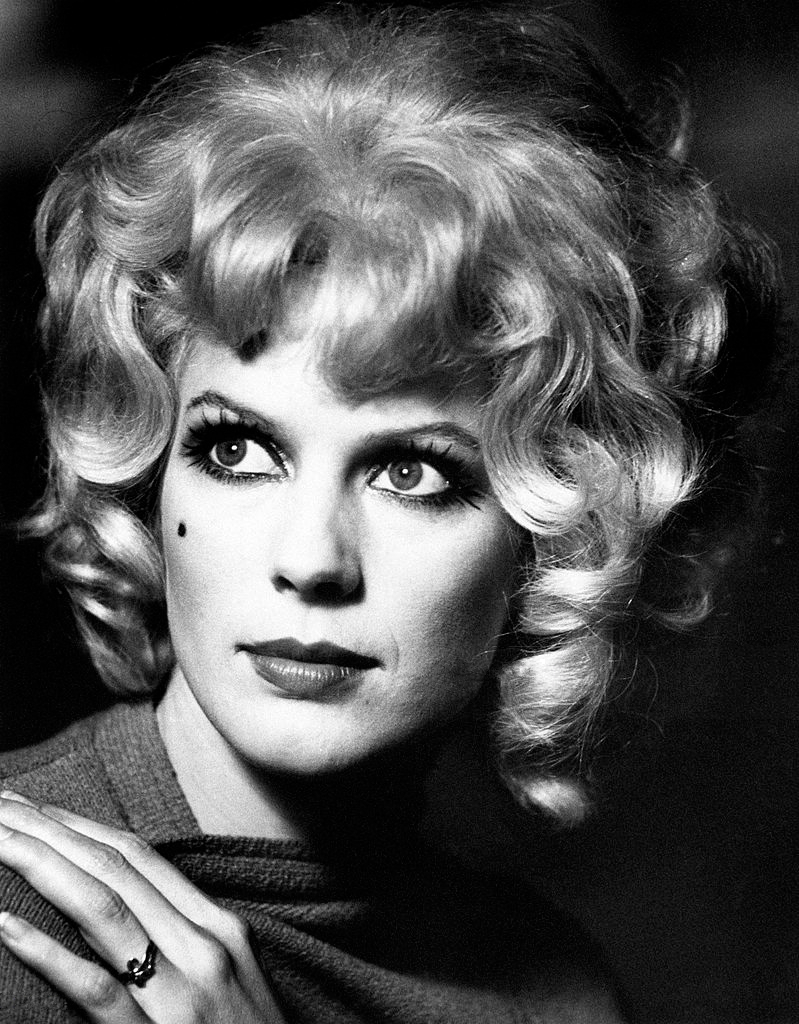
- Farmer in 1975
- Born: Merle Farmer; February 28, 1945 (age 81); Chicago, Illinois, U.S.
- Occupations: Actress, sculptor
- Years active: 1961–1991
- Spouses: Vincenzo Cerami (m. 1970; div. 1986) Francis Poirier (m. 1989)
- Children: 1
- Website: www.mimsyfarmer.com

Merle "Mimsy" Farmer (born February 28, 1945) is an American former actress, artist and sculptor. She began her career appearing in several Hollywood studio films, such as Spencer's Mountain (1963) and Bus Riley's Back in Town (1965), followed by roles in the exploitation films Devil's Angels and Riot on Sunset Strip (both 1967).

Farmer then gained fame as an actress in Europe; her films included the drama More (1969), the adventure film Strogoff (1970), as well as multiple Italian giallo films: Dario Argento's Four Flies on Grey Velvet (1971), The Perfume of the Lady in Black (1974), Autopsy (1975), and Lucio Fulci's The Black Cat (1981). She retired from acting in the early 1990s and went on to work as an artist, creating models for the film industry.

== Early years ==
Farmer was born Merle Farmer on February 28, 1945, in Chicago, Illinois. Her father was a news reporter for the Chicago Tribune and a writer for radio. Her mother was French. Her nickname, which she later took as her stage name, is derived from a line in Lewis Carroll's Jabberwocky: "All mimsy were the borogoves".

When she was four years old, her family relocated to Los Angeles, California, where she was raised. Farmer graduated from Hollywood High School in 1962. Her early experience as an entertainer came in her role of handling rabbits for a magician who performed at children's birthday parties. As a teenager, Farmer also worked as a concession cashier and theater usherette at the Cinerama Dome in Los Angeles.

== Acting career ==
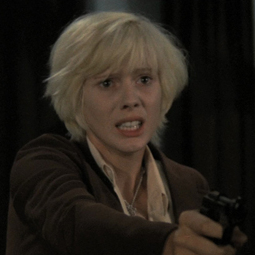
Farmer in Four Flies on Grey Velvet (1971)

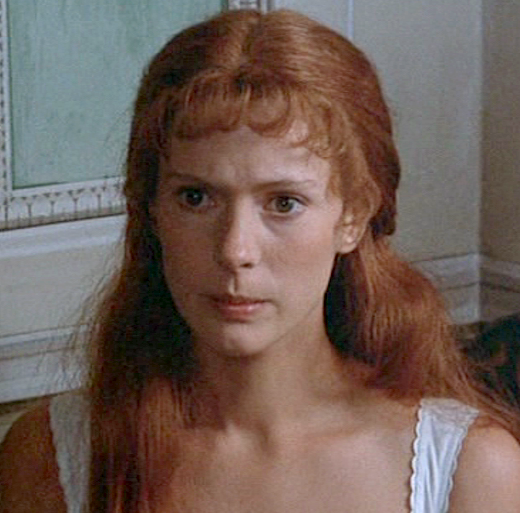
Farmer in Allonsanfàn (1974)

In 1962 and 1963, respectively, Farmer guest-starred as Laurie in "The Swingin' Set" and as Joanne Wells in "Boys and Girls" on the sitcom The Donna Reed Show.

She made two guest appearances on Perry Mason in 1964, including the role of defendant Kathy Anders in "The Case of the Tragic Trophy" and as Sande Lukins in "The Case of the Careless Kidnapper". She appeared on My Three Sons, Honey West, The Adventures of Ozzie and Harriet, The Outer Limits (March 2, 1964, episode "Second Chance") and The F.B.I.

In 1966, she appeared as Lorrie Thatcher in the episode "The Calico Kid" and as Antonia in the episode "A Prince of a Ranger" on Laredo. In 1963, she played a supporting role in Spencer's Mountain. During her film career in the United States, she mostly portrayed party-girl types in films such as Hot Rods to Hell (1967), Riot on Sunset Strip (1967), and The Wild Racers (1968). In the late 1960s, she moved to Italy.

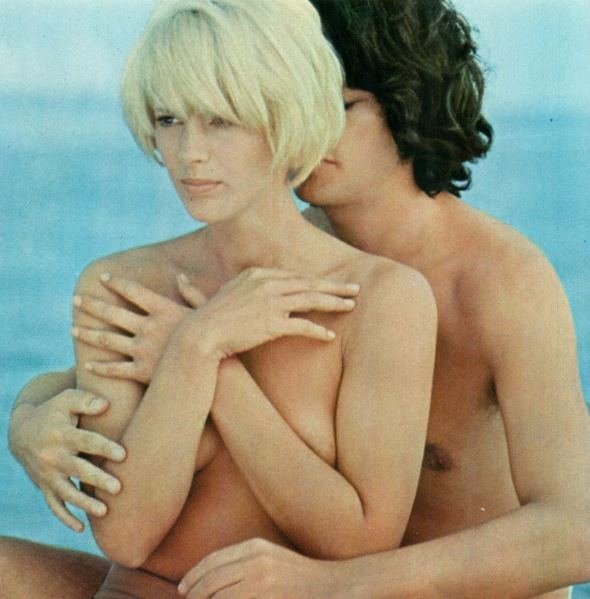
Farmer in Corpo d'amore (1972)

Farmer's breakthrough came when she played a starring role in the French-German production More (1969), a drama about drug addiction, which made her famous in Europe.

In 1971, Farmer won a special David di Donatello film award for acting for her performance in The Road to Salina (1970). In Italy, she appeared in several Italian gialli and horror films such as Four Flies on Grey Velvet by Dario Argento, The Black Cat by Lucio Fulci and The Perfume of the Lady in Black by Francesco Barilli. In France, she was Alain Delon's co-star in Two Men in Town (1973) and played starring roles in crime dramas The Suspects (1974) and The Track (1975).

== Artwork ==
Since 1992, she has worked as a sculptor for theatre and opera in France and Italy, and for films such as Oceans, Troy, Charlie and the Chocolate Factory, Marie Antoinette, Five Children and It, The Golden Compass, Pirates of the Caribbean: On Stranger Tides, Wrath of the Titans, Guardians of the Galaxy, and Beauty and the Beast.

She also creates personal sculptures and paintings.

== Personal life ==
Farmer was married to Italian screenwriter Vincenzo Cerami from 1970 to 1986. They had a daughter, actress Aisha Cerami. She later married French set designer Francis Poirier, with whom she lives in France.

== Filmography ==
=== Film ===
Year	Title	Role	Notes
1961	Gidget Goes Hawaiian	Girl in Lobby	Uncredited
1963	Spencer's Mountain	Claris Coleman	
1965	Bus Riley's Back in Town	Paula	
1967	Hot Rods to Hell	Gloria	
1967	Riot on Sunset Strip	Andrea Dollier	
1967	Devil's Angels	Marianne	
1968	The Wild Racers	Katherine Pearson	
1969	More	Estelle	
1970	Strogoff	Nadia	
1970	Road to Salina	Billie	
1971	Four Flies on Grey Velvet	Nina Tobias	
1972	The Master and Margaret	Margarita	
1972	Corpo d'amore	The Woman	
1973	La vita in gioco	Anna	
1973	One Way	Milena	
1973	Two Men in Town	Lucie	
1973	Les mille et une mains	Nadine	
1974	The Perfume of the Lady in Black	Silvia Hacherman	
1974	Allonsanfàn	Francesca	
1974	The Suspects	Candice Strasberg	
1975	Autopsy	Simona Sana	
1975	The Track	Helen Wells	
1977	Antonio Gramsci: The Days of Prison	Giulia	
1978	L'amant de poche	Helen Miller	
1978	Bye Bye Monkey	Feminist Actress	
1979	The Concorde Affair	Jean Beneyton	
1980	Operation Leopard	Annie Devrindt	
1980	Même les mômes ont du vague à l'âme	Charlotte	
1981	The Black Cat	Jill Travers	
1982	The Girl from Trieste	Valeria	
1983	Quartetto Basileus	Miss Permamint	
1983	The Death of Mario Ricci	Cathy Burns	
1983	Un foro nel parabrezza	Daniza	
1984	The World of Don Camillo	Jo Magro	
1984	Code Name: Wild Geese	Kathy Robson	
1986	La ragazza dei lillà	Leonora	
1986	Body Count	Julia Ritchie	
1986	Evil Senses	Nicol	
1987	Poisons	Anne	
1988	Il segreto dell'uomo solitario		

=== Television ===
Year	Title	Role	Notes
1962	My Three Sons	Janee Holmes	Episode: "Steve gets an "A""
1964	Perry Mason	Sande Lukins	Episode: "The Case of the Careless Kidnapper"
1964	Perry Mason	Kathy Anders	Episode: "The Case of the Tragic Trophy"
1989	Ceux de la soif	Comtesse Von Kleber	TV movie
1991	Safari	Ingrid	TV movie

== Awards and nominations ==
Award	Year	Category	Work	Result	Ref.
Laurel Awards	1963	Top Female New Personality	—N/a	6th place	
David di Donatello	1971	Special David	Road to Salina	Won	
