= The Road to Salina =

- Theatrical release poster
- Directed by: Georges Lautner
- Screenplay by: Georges Lautner; Pascal Jardin; Jack Miller
- Based on: the novel Sur la route de Salina by Maurice Cury; Denoel Editions
- Produced by: Robert Dorfmann; Yvon Guezel
- Starring: Mimsy Farmer; Robert Walker; Rita Hayworth
- Cinematography: Maurice Fellous
- Edited by: Michelle David
- Music by: Clinic; Bernard Gerard; Christophe; Ian Anderson
- Production companies: A Robert Dorfmann– Yvon Guezel Production
- Distributed by: Joseph E. Levine; Avco Embassy
- Release date: 17 November 1970
- Running time: 96 minutes
- Countries: France; Italy; United States
- Language: English

The Road to Salina (French: La Route de Salina; Italian: Quando il sole scotta) is a 1970 psychological thriller film directed by Georges Lautner. It stars Robert Walker, Mimsy Farmer and Rita Hayworth. The film is based on Maurice Cury's novel Sur la Route de Salina. A French–Italian coproduction, it was shot in English in the Canary Islands. Interiors were shot at the Billancourt Studios in Paris with sets designed by the art director Jean d'Eaubonne.

== Plot ==
Jonas, a young drifter, is wandering in a deserted area on the road to Salina, in Mexico. He stops to drink some water at a desolate roadside service station when Mara, the owner, identifies him as her son Rocky, who disappeared four years ago. Jonas is overwhelmed by the awkward situation, but tired and hungry, accepts Mara's offer of room and board. Feeling sorry for Mara, he pretends to be her beloved son and soon comfortably assumes Rocky's identity. Initially, he believes that Mara is simply delusional, but when Mara's old friend and neighbor Warren arrives for a visit, surprisingly, he also acts as if Jonas were Rocky.

When Billie, his alleged sister, comes home, Jonas thinks that the game is over and that he'll finally be unmasked as an impostor. But even the attractive and carefree Billie appears to recognize him as her brother and soon takes him under her wing. They spend the days together, and after skinny dipping in the ocean, an erotic relationship develops between them. Everything seems to be fine and Jonas begins to relax in his new role as Rocky. Mara, Billie and Warren enjoy a dinner party together celebrating Rocky's return.

Realizing that Billie is having a passionate affair with her alleged brother, Mara and Warren fear that the harmony that had so recently returned would soon be broken. Uneasy, Jonas becomes increasingly interested in finding out the reasons for the disappearance of the true Rocky. He gets the first clues in his search from Warren who, never outwardly expressing any doubt that he is Rocky, mentions during the conversation the name of Rocky's girlfriend, Linda, who runs a local restaurant. In search of answers, Jonas goes to Salina and finds Linda at the restaurant. He drops a glass at the bar to draw attention to himself, and finds that Linda is the first person who fails to recognize him as Rocky. Back at the house, Jonas steals some old photographs from Billie's bedroom that confirm his suspicions that he does not even resemble the real Rocky. When he confronts Billie with the truth, she tells him that she lied to protect Mara and that she loves Rocky and wanted him back.

In an attempt to resolve his mounting confusion, Jonas visits Linda again. She tells him that she was going to elope with Rocky the day he disappeared. The surprise visit of Charlie, an old friend of Jonas, once again threatens to completely destroy the façade that he is Rocky, and Mara may have heard Charlie call Jonas by his real name (it's not certain she heard Charlie or not). Charlie and his companions have a good time with Mara, Billie and the bewildered Jonas. Instead of accepting his friend's offer of leaving with him, Jonas stays with Billie and Mara.

Jonas finally learns the shocking truth about the nature of his "sister's" behavior. When Rocky wanted to leave the incestuous relationship with his sister, Billie unintentionally killed him with a rock while trying to stop him. The revelation marks a turning point in Jonas' relationship with Billie, and from then on, she avoids him. Rebuked by her, Jonas explodes during an argument with Billie. Shaking her against a wall, he accidentally kills her. He runs away in the middle of a rainstorm in spite of Mara's protestations. Mara begs him to stay, and even calls Jonas by his real name, verifying that she was sane and knew Jonas wasn't Rocky all along. Mara offers to help him hide Billie's body under the station as Billie had done with Rocky, but instead, Jonas goes to Salina and tells the sheriff what has happened. The story is told in flashback.

== Cast ==
The film is notable for its cast. The lead is played by Robert Walker Jr., son of famous actors Robert Walker and Jennifer Jones. It was the last film of Ed Begley who died in April 1970, and the second-to-last of legendary screen siren Rita Hayworth.

- Mimsy Farmer — Billie
- Robert Walker — Jonas
- Ed Begley — Warren
- Bruce Pecheur — Charlie
- Ivano Staccioli — Linda's Husband
- David Sachs — Sheriff
- Sophie Hardy — Linda
- Albane — Pat
- Jaime
- Ellie
- Oswaldo D'Allo
- El Pollo
- Sierra
- Dada Gallotti
- Marc Porel — Rocky
- and also starring Rita Hayworth as Mara

== Soundtrack ==
The score was composed by a varied team that included popular French artist Christophe, the rock group Clinic, and arranger-composer Bernard Gerard. Recording took place in Paris at the legendary Studio Davout. The eclectic soundtrack features songs and underscore written and performed by both singer-songwriter Christophe and the US/British/Canadian progressive rock band Clinic, whose lineup included Phil Trainer (Steele), Alan Reeves and Philip Brigham. Orchestral arrangements were written and conducted by Gérard. Under the guidance of director Lautner, the diverse team created a sound palette according to the dark tone of the film. The now-classic soundtrack album was re-released in 2003 by Sony France on the Dreyfus label, and would receive further widespread acclaim the following year when Christophe's theme "Sunny Road to Salina" and Clinic's "The Chase" were used by Quentin Tarantino in Kill Bill: Volume 2. The Christophe title got widespread usage in Kill Bill trailers around the world, while "The Chase" was among the tracks chosen for the Grammy Award-nominated Kill Bill Vol. 2 (soundtrack) album.

== Reception ==
In the U.S. The Road to Salina had a modest and brief release. Its play-date was usually on the lower half of a double feature.

Kevin Thomas of the Los Angeles Times called it " An admirable ambitious film of strictly sophisticated appeal." He described the film as:" A fable showing how tragedy can occur when reality intrudes upon the lonely lives of those who live in a world of fantasy". The review in Newsday called Road to Salina " A very strange film... More perversely compelling than it has a right to be". In The Village Voice, Robert Colaciello wrote: " If your taste runs to 70s actors having 60s sex in a 50s film so that a 40s star can suffer, then Road to Salina is for you "

== Bibliography ==
- Ringgold, Gene: The Films of Rita Hayworth: The legend and Career of a Love Goddess, The Citadel Press, Seacacus, N.J, 1974, ISBN 0-8065-0439-0
