= Roadshow theatrical release =

Theatrical release format

A roadshow theatrical release or reserved-seat engagement is the practice of opening a film in a limited number of theaters in major cities for a specific period of time before or after the wide release of the film. Roadshows would generally mimic a live theatre production, with an upscale atmosphere, as well as somewhat higher prices than during a wide release. They were commonly used to promote major films from the 1920s–60s and build excitement.

Roadshows had a number of features that distinguished them from normal releases. An intermission was used between the two "acts" of the film, with the first act usually somewhat longer than the second. Films selected for roadshow treatment were typically longer than the usual motion picture, lasting from slightly more than two hours to four hours or more, counting the intermission. No short subjects accompanied the film, with rarely any promotional trailers. Screenings were limited to one or two a day, sold on a reserved-seat basis, and admission prices were higher than those of regular screenings. Souvenir programs containing photos from the film, photos and biographies of its cast and principal crew, and information on the film's production would be sold, occasionally along with other merchandise. Similar to touring theater productions, films would be presented in a city for a limited number of weeks before the physical filmstock was moved to another city. Finally, while not every roadshow was intended for this, roadshows sometimes acted as a predecessor to modern focus groups to measure audience reception. When this was done, audience members were encouraged to write their thoughts and feedback on cards, and producers would use the feedback and monitoring the audience to gauge which parts of the "long" version of a film should be cut for shorter runtimes during the wide release.

Roadshows were profitable and effective in the early years of cinema, when films spread by word of mouth and releases were more gradual. Societal changes in the 1960s and '70s dulled the prestige of the "event" style, however. Fewer ornate theaters in the style of movie palaces existed by the 1970s, with more movie theaters adjusting for efficient but unromantic buildings unsuitable for fancy events. Roadshows evolved into limited releases after the 1970s, as the faux live theatre appeal began to wear off and more films opted for a "blockbuster" approach of opening to as many theatres simultaneously as possible.

== U.S. releases ==
The roadshow format had been used since the days of silent films, but the rise of widescreen and stereophonic sound in the 1950s made it especially attractive to studio executives, who hoped to lure audiences away from television by presenting films in a way that an audience at that time could never hope to see at home. Possibly, the first film ever shown in a roadshow engagement was the French film Les Amours de la reine Elisabeth in America in 1912, a 53-minute motion picture, which starred stage actress Sarah Bernhardt.

Films shown in a roadshow format before 1951 included:

- The Birth of a Nation (1915)
- Intolerance (1916)
- The Covered Wagon (1923)
- The Hunchback of Notre Dame (1923)
- The Ten Commandments (1923)
- Ben-Hur (1925)
- The Big Parade (1925)
- Wings (1927), the first Best Picture Academy Award winner
- The Jazz Singer (1927), the first feature length part-talkie
- Chicago (1927), the silent film based on the play that inspired the Kander and Ebb Broadway musical and Oscar-winning film
- The Broadway Melody (1929)
- Show Boat (1929), a part-talkie based not on the 1927 stage musical but on Edna Ferber's original novel from which the musical was adapted
- Hollywood Revue (1929)
- The Desert Song (1929)
- Rio Rita (1929)
- Paris (1929)
- Sally (1929)
- Howard Hughes' Hell's Angels (1930)
- The Big Trail (1930) The first starring role for John Wayne
- Grand Hotel (1932), winner of the Academy Award for Best Picture
- Strange Interlude (1932)
- The Kid from Spain (1932)
- The Sign of the Cross (1932)
- A Farewell to Arms (1932)
- Cavalcade (1933)
- A Midsummer Night's Dream (1935)
- The Great Ziegfeld (1936)
- In Old Chicago (1937)
- Lost Horizon (1937)
- Gone with the Wind (1939)
- Fantasia (1940)
- Best Foot Forward (1943)
- For Whom the Bell Tolls (1943)
- The Song of Bernadette (1943)
- This Is the Army (1943) (shown only in roadshow format on initial release)
- Since You Went Away (1944)
- Spellbound (1945)
- The Best Years of Our Lives (1946)
- Duel in the Sun (1946)
- Mourning Becomes Electra (1947)
- Joan of Arc (1948)
- Samson and Delilah (1949)
- Quo Vadis (1951). However, the theatre exhibitors of Quo Vadis took the unusual step of opening the film in two New York theatres simultaneously, where it was shown in roadshow format in one theatre, while the other one ran the nearly three-hour film in the more conventional, "continuous performances" manner.

== Selected notable British releases ==
British films that were shown as roadshow attractions in the US included:

- Henry V (1944 in England and 1946 in the U.S.)
- Hamlet (1948)
- The Red Shoes (1948)

== Distinguishing features ==
In a roadshow release, a large-scale epic film would open in larger cities in an engagement much like a theatrical musical, often with components such as an overture, first act, intermission, entr'acte, second act, and exit music. The overture, distinguished from the main title music, was played before the beginning of the film, while the lights were still up and the curtains were still closed. As the lights dimmed, the overture ended, the curtains opened, and the film began with its main title music and opening credits. The exit music was played after the film had ended, following the closing credits, while the auditorium lights were on and the curtains were closed. Many movie theaters until the 1980s had curtains that covered the screen, and which would open when the show actually began and close when it ended.

Some roadshow scheduling mimicked the performance schedule of live theatre such as Broadway theatre. Wednesdays, Saturdays, and Sundays would have two screenings, while during the rest of the week, the films would be shown only once a day.

== Examples ==
An early example of this form of presentation was used for Gone with the Wind (1939). Running almost four hours in length, the film was divided into the above components.

The original theatrical release of Walt Disney's Fantasia, presented in Fantasound in selected large cities in the United States, never had an overture, entr'acte, or exit music. Still, Fantasia was first released in the roadshow format, included an intermission in its first run, and was originally presented without on-screen credits to perpetuate a concert-going experience—the printed souvenir program, given out to patrons as they entered the theater, presented the film's credits.

The original New York run of the English-language film Cyrano de Bergerac (1950), starring Jose Ferrer and based on Edmond Rostand's 1897 French play, was likewise presented in a roadshow format (that is, one or two performances a day), although the film is only two hours long, was not produced on a large budget, and does not contain an intermission.

The color version of Show Boat (1951) was also shown in a roadshow format in some theaters, despite being less than two hours long, and not having an overture, intermission, entr'acte, or exit music.

=== 1950s to 1970s ===
From around 1952 to the early 1970s, with audiences switching to television, studios tried to entice movie audiences back to theaters by making widescreen epics and using the "roadshow" means of presentation and promotion. Films shot in three dimensions were sometimes also shown in a roadshow format with intermission, regardless of actual length, as well as many films shot in widescreen processes, such as CinemaScope, Todd-AO, MGM Camera 65, and Super Panavision 70, and films that were blown up to 70 from the 35 mm negative. As a result, an avalanche of roadshow films occurred during those decades, often more than one in a year.

Among them were:

- This Is Cinerama (1952)
- The Robe (1953)
- Hondo (1953)
- House of Wax (1953)
- A Star is Born (1954)
- Dial M for Murder (1954)
- Oklahoma! (1955)
- Richard III (1955)
- East of Eden (1955)
- Guys and Dolls (1955)
- Cinerama Holiday (1955)
- High Society (1956)
- Helen of Troy (1956)
- War and Peace (1956)
- Around the World in 80 Days (1956)
- The Ten Commandments (1956)
- Seven Wonders of the World (1956)
- Giant (1956) (without intermission)
- The Bridge on the River Kwai (1957)
- Raintree County (1957)
- Search for Paradise (1957)
- Windjammer (1958)
- South Pacific (1958)
- South Seas Adventure (1958)
- The Big Country (1958)
- Porgy and Bess (1959)
- The Diary of Anne Frank (1959)
- Ben-Hur (1959)
- Sleeping Beauty (1959) (without intermission)
- The Alamo (1960)
- Spartacus (1960)
- Exodus (1960)
- Can-Can (1960)
- Scent of Mystery (1961)
- West Side Story (1961)
- Judgment at Nuremberg (1961)
- El Cid (1961)
- Barabbas (1961)
- King of Kings (1961)
- Lawrence of Arabia (1962)
- Mutiny on the Bounty (1962)
- The Wonderful World of the Brothers Grimm (1962)
- How the West Was Won (1962)
- The Longest Day (1962)
- It's a Mad, Mad, Mad, Mad World (1963)
- The Cardinal (1963)
- Cleopatra (1963)
- 55 Days at Peking (1963)
- Hamlet (1964)
- Becket (1964)
- Cheyenne Autumn (1964)
- The Carpetbaggers (1964)
- Circus World (1964)
- My Fair Lady (1964)
- The Fall of the Roman Empire (1964)
- Mary Poppins (1964)
- The Sound of Music (1965)
- The Greatest Story Ever Told (1965)
- Othello (1965)
- Doctor Zhivago (1965)
- The Great Race (1965)
- Those Magnificent Men in their Flying Machines (1965)
- The Agony and the Ecstasy (1965)
- Battle of the Bulge (1965)
- Khartoum (1966)
- Cinerama's Russian Adventure (1966)
- Hawaii (1966)
- Is Paris Burning? (1966)
- The Bible: In the Beginning... (1966)
- The Blue Max (1966)
- The Sand Pebbles (1966)
- Grand Prix (1966)
- Half a Sixpence (1967)
- Camelot (1967)
- Doctor Dolittle (1967)
- Far from the Madding Crowd (1967)
- The Happiest Millionaire (1967)
- Thoroughly Modern Millie (1967)
- Ice Station Zebra (1968)
- The Lion in Winter (1968)
- 2001: A Space Odyssey (1968)
- Oliver! (1968)
- Romeo and Juliet (1968)
- Finian's Rainbow (1968)
- Where Eagles Dare (1968)
- Star! (1968)
- Funny Girl (1968)
- The Shoes of the Fisherman (1968)
- Chitty Chitty Bang Bang (1968)
- Paint Your Wagon (1969)
- Sweet Charity (1969)
- Goodbye, Mr. Chips (1969)
- Hello, Dolly! (1969)
- Krakatoa, East of Java (1969)
- Marooned (1969)
- The Adventurers (1970)
- Patton (1970)
- Song of Norway (1970)
- Darling Lili (1970)
- Tora! Tora! Tora! (1970)
- Scrooge (1970)
- Ryan's Daughter (1970)
- Bedknobs and Broomsticks (1971)
- Fiddler on the Roof (1971)
- Nicholas and Alexandra (1971)
- Mary, Queen of Scots (1971)
- The Cowboys (1972)
- Young Winston (1972)
- The Great Waltz (1972)
- 1776 (1972) (on Laserdisc only)
- Man of La Mancha (1972)
- Jeremiah Johnson (1972)
- Last Tango in Paris (1973)
- Tom Sawyer (1973)
- Lost Horizon (1973)
- Funny Lady (1975)

Not all of these post-1951 roadshow releases were hits. Several of them, especially the musicals, were box-office flops that lost money for the studios, even if they had previously been hits as stage shows.

Some of the films, such as the Olivier Othello or the Burton Hamlet, were not intended to be box-office hits, but were created as a means to bring these productions to a wider public than could have seen them onstage, much as American Film Theatre would do in the mid-1970s.

Many of these roadshow releases, including Disney's Sleeping Beauty, were shown in six-track stereophonic sound, a then non-standard feature of motion pictures. West Side Story, although shown in 70mm and six track stereophonic sound, was shown with an intermission with all 70mm prints as well as its 70mm re-releases, but was, in most areas, shown without one in order to increase the tension in the plot—an idea recommended by the filmmakers themselves.

Some films like The Guns of Navarone (1961) were often occasionally shown as roadshows for international releases, even if they weren't intended as roadshows for domestic release.

The King and I (1956), which had originally been shown in 35mm 4-Track stereophonic sound and without an overture, intermission and exit music, was re-released in 1961 in the 70mm format with an overture, intermission and exit music, remixed into six-track stereophonic sound, and shown in a roadshow format. The film had originally been made in Cinemascope 55 and through advances in technology was now able to be re-released in a process called Grandeur 70.

Films made in three-camera Cinerama always received roadshow releases to show off the technology. The special requirements needed to show films in Cinerama—a theater with a huge, ultra-curved screen, three projectors running simultaneously, and seven-track stereophonic sound—made it impossible to show its films in wide release unless the picture was converted to standard one projector format (i.e. Panavision).

Since most of those cut off the sides of the original combined picture, eventually, with the advent of anamorphic lenses, a number of Cinerama roadshows were able to be compressed onto normal 5-perf 70mm film and with the extra-wide screens installed, normal 70mm theaters were able to play these reformatted Cinerama titles.

== Exceptions ==
There were some notable exceptions to the standard roadshow release format, three of them Shakespeare productions. One was Othello (1965), which was essentially a filmed visual record of the Laurence Olivier 1964 London stage production, shot in a movie studio, but on enlarged stage settings. The nearly three-hour color film, made in Panavision and shown in 35mm and mono sound in many areas, was shown in 70mm and six-track stereophonic sound in exactly one engagement - in London in 1966.

Being a film that lay somewhere between a photographed play and a true motion picture, the film did not make sufficient use of the spectacular vistas that 1960s widescreen epics usually boasted. In addition, while it had no overture, entr'acte music, or exit music, it was still shown on a two-performance-a-day basis with an intermission, as nearly all roadshow releases were. However, it was shown in U.S. cinemas for an extremely limited release: only two days, in contrast to the customary and lengthy months-long engagements enjoyed by most roadshow films.

The same was true of the Richard Burton Hamlet, which was presented in the same type of extremely limited engagement as Othello. Filmed over two days in a black-and-white process called Electronovision, which resembled a 1960s videotaped broadcast, this three hours plus production featured none of the epic features that were a standard of roadshow theatrical release – no impressive scenery, no gorgeous color, no beautiful costumes, or stereophonic sound, only an intermission halfway through the performance. It was not even, strictly speaking, a full-scale film version of the play, but merely a visual recording of a performance of it at the Lunt-Fontanne Theatre, with a live audience. At three hours and eleven minutes, it was then the longest film version of Hamlet.

Another exception was Franco Zeffirelli's version of Romeo and Juliet (1968), which, although photographed in beautiful settings and certainly having the look of an epic, was shown in most areas in monaural sound (although its three soundtrack albums were all made in stereo) and was projected at a screen aspect ratio of 1.66:1; that is, roughly the dimensions of today's average movie screen or HDTV screen, not the very wide screens required for films made in Ultra Panavision, CinemaScope, Todd-AO or any of the other widescreen processes invented in the 1950s meant that the film lacked many of the customary roadshow elements of the period. However The Mexican release of the picture, did feature a six-track stereo surround mix and was shown with its original 1.66:1 aspect ratio matted to a 2.2 in standard 70mm.)

Similarly, the first film version of The Lion in Winter (1968), although a roadshow release filmed on location with gorgeous color and beautiful scenery, instead of being released in 70mm and 6-track stereo sound - even though it was shown in Technicolor, it was only from 35mm Panavision (anamorphic) film and mono sound. Only in Australia and in its 1973 London re-release was the picture shown in both 70mm and stereophonic sound. Nicholas and Alexandra (1971), another roadshow release, was also shown in 70mm 6-track only in Europe, while its U.S. release was in regular Panavision with monophonic sound.

In addition to the above, The Diary of Anne Frank (1959), Judgment at Nuremberg (1961), The Longest Day (1962) and Is Paris Burning? (1966) were four epics that were made in black and white instead of color. Before then, roadshow epics alternated between getting released in black and white or color.

=== Edited versions and restoration ===
It was common practice for studios to cut some of these epics for general release in order for theaters to book more showings a day and present the film at reduced "popular prices", especially if the film ran longer than two hours. Sometimes this was done to a successful film, such as South Pacific, but more often to one that had been a significant flop, in an effort to make it a success on its second run. As a result, some of these films have not been seen in their entirety since their first release, as the original edited footage is either missing or no longer exists. With the work of film preservationists and restoration, such roadshow flops as A Midsummer Night's Dream (1935), Mourning Becomes Electra (1947), Joan of Arc (1948), A Star Is Born (1954) and Fantasia (1940), along with the films For Whom the Bell Tolls (1943), Spartacus (1960), Lawrence of Arabia (1962), Around the World in 80 Days (1956) and It's a Mad, Mad, Mad, Mad World (1963), all of which had significant footage missing, have been restored in recent years to match the filmmakers' original intent. However, several long films, such as Gone With the Wind and The Ten Commandments, have never been released in edited form, and were nearly always shown on a two performance-a-day basis.

In Old Chicago, despite its roadshow presentation running only 110 minutes, was edited down to 95 minutes for general release, but restored to its full length on DVD.

Frequently, unless the film was exceptionally long, the intermission, along with the overture, ent'racte music, and exit music would be eliminated when it went into general release, in order to save twenty minutes and possibly squeeze in more showings, and the film would be shown just like any other motion picture. Often too, the souvenir programs that were a part of the roadshow release of the films were no longer given out during the wide release.

=== Rise of the limited release ===
The practice of roadshow presentation began dying out in the 1970s, partly because of sequence of costly box-office flops, and partly due to the rise of the multiplex. As multiplexes began to increase in number, and as more and more skyscraper hotels and office buildings took the place of the oldtime movie palaces, theater exhibitors began showing long films in a more informal format. Francis Ford Coppola's Oscar-winning epics The Godfather (1972) and The Godfather Part II (1974), for instance, were made with mono sound, shown without intermissions, and were given more than two performances a day, despite their extreme length. Stanley Kubrick's Barry Lyndon (1975) was shown more than twice a day, but included an intermission.

Although some very long films such as Gone with the Wind, which was re-released in 70mm and six track sound in 1967, would always be shown with an intermission and some films like Huckleberry Finn (1974) would be released with overtures until 1979, "reserved seat" showings of new films became extremely rare. The last film musical to officially receive a reserved seat engagement was Lost Horizon (1973), a financial and critical disaster.

In the late 1970s, only three films (two popular and one a legendary disaster) received a reserved seat engagement. Michael Cimino made the successful film The Deer Hunter (1978), which was a commercial and critical success, winning the Oscar for Best Picture. In its initial run, it was enlarged to 70mm film and given a roadshow release. Francis Ford Coppola, director of The Godfather, made Apocalypse Now (1979), another three-hour epic which received some favorable reviews and is now considered one of his best. The film had a difficult production history, and after five years of production it premiered in a U.S. reserved seat engagement in 70mm. It became a great financial success, and made even more money years later when the director's cut was released. Cimino's next film was Heaven's Gate (1980), which was one of the biggest ever box-office failures. It had a roadshow release and premiered in a 70mm version with an intermission. The roadshow engagement was the shortest in history, for only three theaters held the screenings. Its New York run lasted three days, the Toronto run was shown once, and the Los Angeles engagement was cancelled.

One development that diminished the novelty of the modern roadshow release was that, beginning with Star Wars (1977), stereophonic sound began to be used more and more in films, even ones that were not really big-budget spectaculars. Most films, however, were at that time still released only with mono sound. Jaws, for example, made a mere two years before Star Wars, was originally released in this format. However, Reds (1981), Gandhi (1982) and Scarface (1983) originally received releases with intermissions, due to their extreme lengths, but while Gandhi received a 70mm engagement, Reds and Scarface did not.

By 1984, the entire roadshow format had also largely been abandoned, as the rise of the multiplex and competition from cable TV and home video began forcing changes in the nature of film industry. For example, Carmen (1984), an uncut two-and-a-half hour film version of the Georges Bizet opera, was not released as a roadshow nor shown with an intermission, despite the fact that the film was so faithful to the opera that it kept the stage version's original division into four acts. This version of Carmen was also filmed in six-track stereo and on location, like many epics.

Even though the format had died out, Gettysburg (1993), Hamlet (1996) and Gods and Generals (2003) were screened with intermissions due to their extreme lengths on their original releases. While all three films had no official overture, entr'acte or exit music, cinemas choose to show the films accompanied with the commercially available film soundtracks playing as the audience entered and exited theaters. Gettysburg and Hamlet were screened with two screenings a day while Gods and Generals was not. Titanic (1997) was 195 minutes long, prompting some cinemas to add a short mid-film break or to screen it without commercials for health and safety reasons. It has been restored twice (in 70mm and later 3D 4K) and rereleased in a limited engagement format each time.

Today, a practice of first premiering a film in larger cities is more common, mainly towards the end of the year, in order to qualify for film award consideration, including the Academy Awards. Such recent films that have gone the limited release route include Million Dollar Baby (2004), The Aviator (2004), March of the Penguins (2005), and the Disney film The Princess and the Frog (2009); these and other such limited release films eventually opened wide. Sometimes this is done to allow a film to receive a wide release shortly after the first of the year, while qualifying for the previous year's Academy Awards. Often, smaller films (often art and independent) will receive an initial release in New York and Los Angeles, and later expand to other cities based on results; this is called "platforming" or a platform release.

Occasionally roadshow releases are done for special event films. In 2006, the film Dreamgirls, based on the Broadway stage musical, was given a three-theater road show release, with reserved seats and program guides. Tickets were significantly higher priced than normal, at $25. The film itself was not shown with an intermission.

In 2008 and 2009, the four-hour biopic Che, starring Benicio del Toro as Che Guevara, was shown in a roadshow format for a limited time in a number of large cities.

Quentin Tarantino, who remembers the roadshow era fondly, released The Hateful Eight in selected theaters on Christmas Day before expanding into a wide release on December 30, 2015. Tarantino shot the film in anamorphic 70mm (specifically the single-strip 6-track stereo Cinerama format described above) and managed to get the film booked in roughly 100 theaters worldwide that were provided 70mm projectors and lenses to equip the theaters to cope with the Cinerama format by The Weinstein Company to screen the film as the director intended. Deadline Hollywood referred to this release as a roadshow presentation, as it included all the hallmarks of a traditional roadshow release, such as programs, an overture and an intermission.

Roadshow releases have also been used for catalog films, such Kevin Smith's tour of Dogma for its 25th anniversary, and Francis Ford Coppola's tour of Megalopolis.

== See also ==
- Film release
