= Silvia Gabriela =

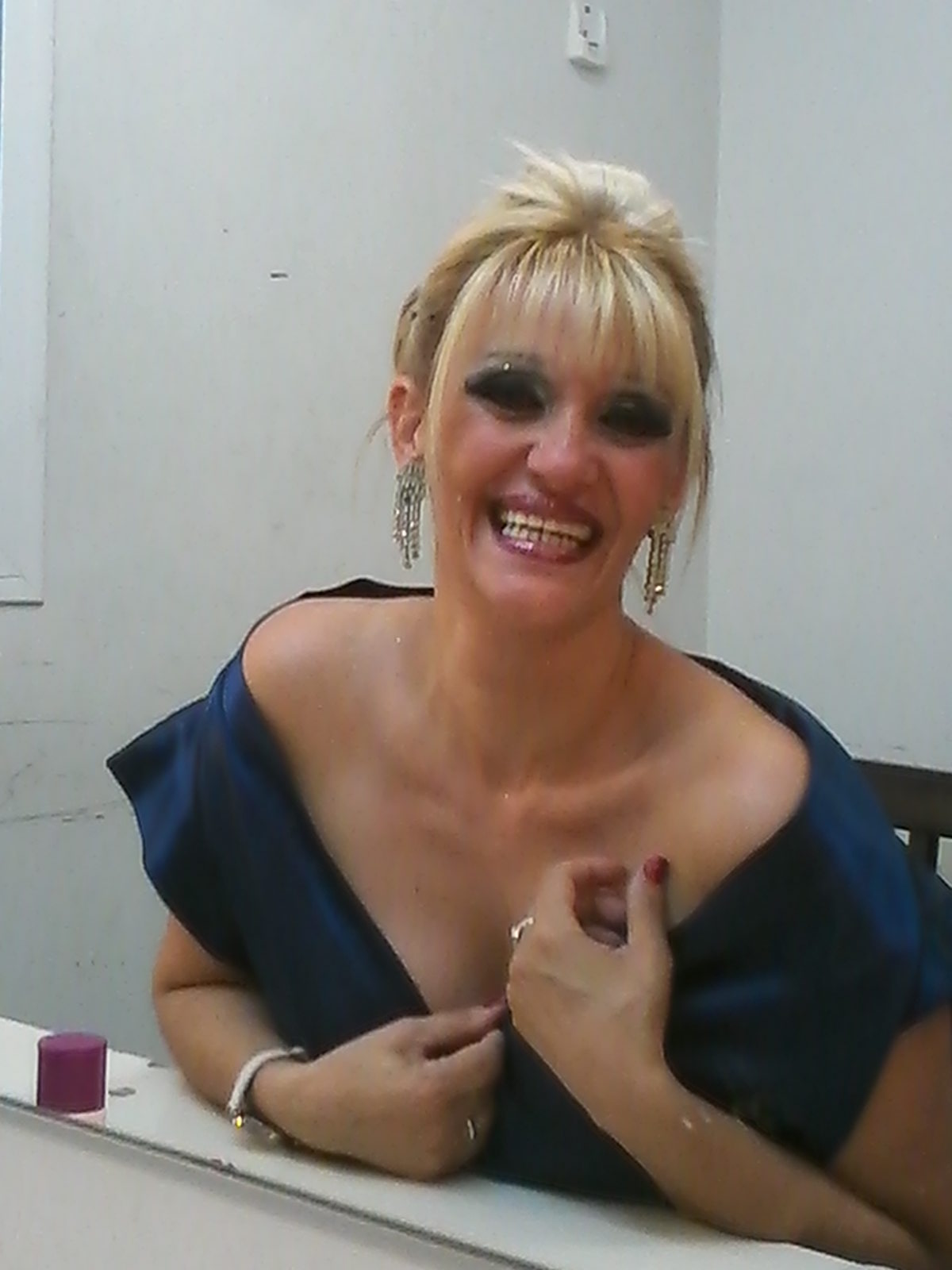

Background information
- Also known as: Silvia Gabriela Garro
- Born: 1970 (age 54–55); San Luis, Argentina
- Genres: Tango
- Occupation: Singer
- Years active: 1986-present
- Website: www.silviagabriela.com

Silvia Gabriela Garro, known as Silvia Gabriela (born 1970, San Luis) is an Argentine tango singer based in Australia. She has received several awards throughout her career, most notably the Golden Condor at the International Tango Festival (2008).

== Biography ==
She was considered a "Revelation Artist" on International Women's Day (1986), and made her debut as a singer alongside Argentinian singer and actor Alberto Castillo. Later, she trained as a singing teacher at the Conservatorio Galvani in Buenos Aires (1990).

She lived for eleven years in Villa Mercedes and later formed an ensemble with pianist Carlos Granado and bandoneon player Miguel Tortorelli. In 2002, she was chosen as the lead singer of Armando Caló's Orchestra, a band that had performed with Carlos Gardel, and travelled with them throughout Latin America.

She later became a member of the group Music Tango Review, also created by Armando Caló, and was chosen by producer Luis Cella for the multimedia show "El tango y el vino" at the "Almacén de Tango" venue in Mendoza. The artists performed the show for 700 consecutive nights (2007-2008) and won the Golden Condor at the International Tango Festival. The band members were: Elián Sellanes (piano); Rodolfo Zanett (bandoneón), Pablo Guzzo (bass and double bass) and the voices of Omar Berón, and Silvia Gabriela. Gardel's repertoire was mixed with images: "La cumparsita", "Muñeca brava", "Milonga sentimental", "Uno" or "De puro curda", "Volver", "Cuesta abajo" and "Por una cabeza". She also performed in the show "La Noche del Zorzal", another tribute to Gardel. The show "Buenos Aires Tango y Vino" toured Spain, and among other theatres, they were at the Nuevo Teatro Alcalá.

In 2008, she conducted her own television programme "Tango Osado" from the province of Mendoza, produced by her and music producer Elián Sellanes. Since then, she has been directing the radio programme "El tango uniendo culturas" on the radio platforms Tinta de Escritores, and Radio América. She sang in the show "Los Cedros" in San Luis capital. Her version of the Argentine national anthem to the rhythm of tango and milonga was widely celebrated.

One of the highlights of her career was when she sang a duet with Julio Iglesias "My way" in Punta Cana, Dominican Republic.

== International shows and tours ==
She has performed in many different forums and venues. In addition to touring much of Latin America, in 2001 she was a featured artist in the Argentina Tango Review which toured Colombia, Venezuela and Ecuador. She also sang at the gala of the Asociación de Periodistas de Radio y Televisión de la República Argentina (APTRA) in 2001.

Among the festivals, Silvia Gabriela closed the 14th Festival Internacional de la Calle Angosta 2001. She also sang at the opening of the "Juan Gilberto Funes" stadium in the city of La Punta (2003); at the "Gaviota de Oro" Awards in Mar del Plata (2006); at the 21st National Festival "Rivadavia le Canta al País" (2007); at the Festival Internacional de La Vendimia; at "Música al Aire Libre" 2008 and at the Tribute to Mirtha Legrand, Mendoza, 2008.

Gabriela participated in most of the editions of the Festival Internacional de Tango de San Luis, where she gained recognition from her own province with the "Cóndor de Oro", and at the Festival de los Vientos, in La Punta, 2018.

She was also a member of the "Humor y Glamour" tour (2009) that crossed Argentina with the comedians "Chiqui" Abecasis, Jorge Troiani, "Chelo" Rodríguez, and the vedette Beatriz Salomón, among others.

She also participated in the show "Noche, tangos y perfume de mujer" at the Mauricio López Auditorium (National University of San Luis, 2011).20 In 2014 she toured Chile with the tango group "Malevaje".

Her debut tour of Australia (2015) was with the show "Al rojo tango" created by the Australian dancer and choreographer Fabio Robles, and she performed in Sydney, Melbourne and Canberra. When on this tour she sang the National Anthem to the rhythm of tango, it was a high point of connection with Argentinian emigrants.

In 2015, she toured Australia again with "Milonga Uruguay Club". At the end of 2019 a new tour took her through Australia and Indonesia with her husband, and they were caught up in the COVID-19 pandemic in Melbourne. After this tour she was hired and stayed in Melbourne, where she lives and where she continues her artistic and solidarity work, taking part in charity events. During the COVID-19 pandemic, she offered one-hour online concerts every fortnight, interacting with her audiences from all over the world.

She considers that tango is a "play that lasts three minutes and therefore, in addition to singing it, it must be interpreted". Her dedication to tango keeps her in touch with her homeland, having dedicated a tango to it called "San Luis Pasión Eterna". She has also been a guest star at Argentine festivals held in Casilda and Junín, and at the "Tango, Vino y Cinco Sentidos" show in Melbourne.

== Social and cultural work ==
She is an ambassador and promoter of tango and also an advocate for other causes (she campaigns against gender violence, supports a sustainable world, defends the dignity of artists). She is general director of the World Art and Culture Development Plan and founder of the Multicultural Arts Collective Australia MACA, which promotes peace through art. Her artistic work allowed her to obtain a special visa for talents, the Distinguished Talent, granted by the Australian government.

Since 2022, it has been developing a peace initiative called "Global Campaign to Raise Awareness of the Value of Art in Promoting World Peace", inviting artists from all over the world to send their video testimonials, a message about the value of art in promoting peace in the world.

== Honours ==
- Obelisco de Oro, 2020. Embassy of Argentina in Australia.
- Golden Condor of the International Tango Festival, 2008.
- Medal as "Outstanding Artist of the Province of San Luis" Diario La República, 2002.
- "Premio Escenario" as best Tango singer in Mendoza and as best Tango show in "El Tango y El Vino", 2008.
- Award "35 years of her career".

== Discography ==
- Himno Nacional Argentino a ritmo de tango, with Sosa Pontier and Mariano Leyes, 2003
- República Tango, my other country, 2010
- Tango y algo más, with the Ensamble de San Luis, Calle Angosta Discos, 2014
