= Alan Haufrect =

American film, stage and television actor (1941–2024)

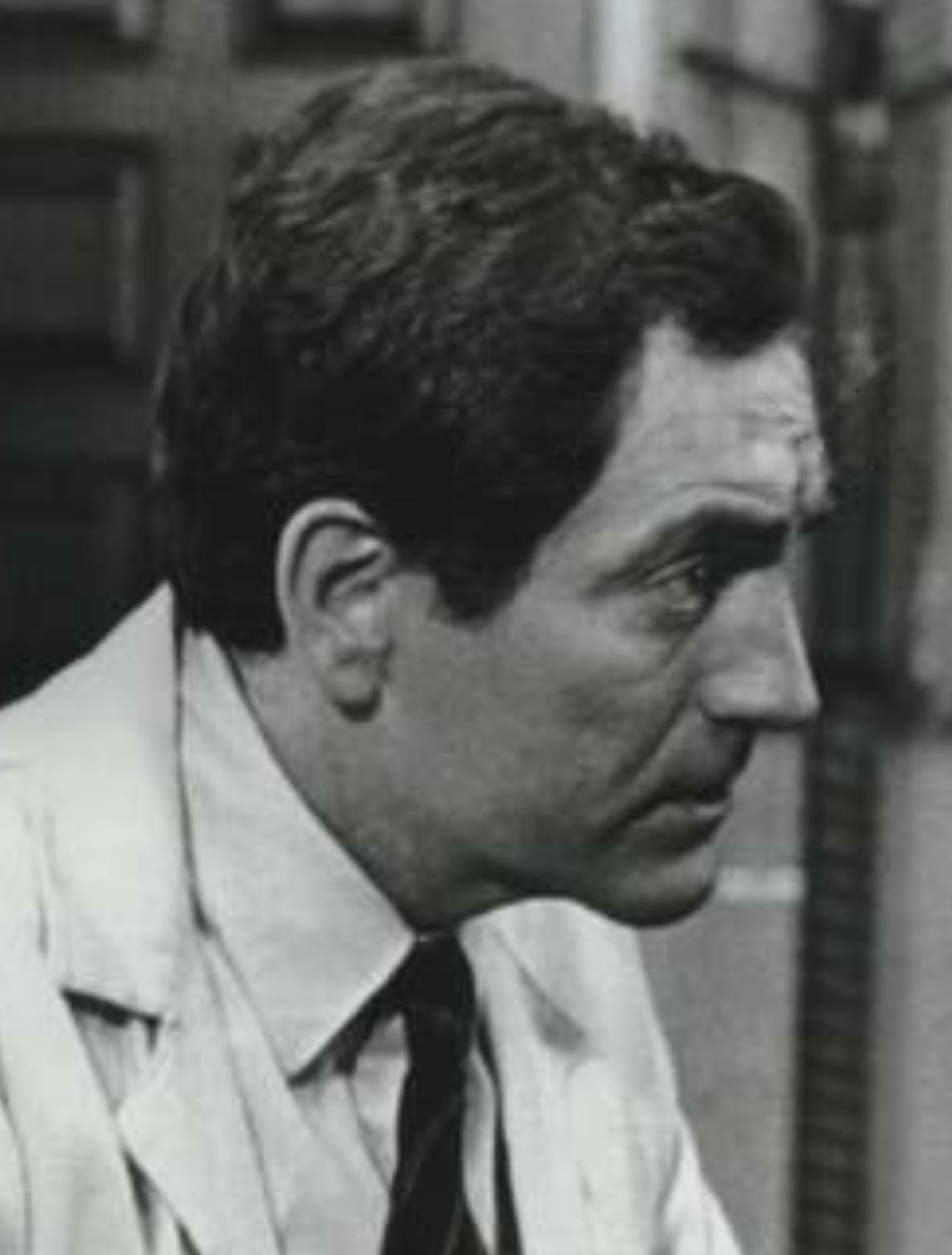
- Haufrect in 1987
- Born: Alan Mark Haufrect; April 3, 1941; Cleveland, Ohio, U.S.
- Died: August 17, 2024 (aged 83); Century City, Los Angeles, California, U.S.
- Occupations: Film, stage and television actor

Alan Mark Haufrect (April 3, 1941 – August 17, 2024) was an American film, stage and television actor.

== Life and career ==
Haufrect was born in Cleveland, Ohio, the son of a doctor Fred Haufrect and Hilda Haufrect. He graduated from Bellaire High School in Houston, Texas.

He attended at the David Geffen School of Drama at Yale University. Haufrect performed as a soloist at the New Orleans Philharmonic Orchestra. He also performed on stage, including at the summer. Haufrect then began his film and television career in 1968, first starring in the film The Wild Racers, where he played Virgil. After that, he guest-starred in the sitcom television series Barney Miller, with also guest-starring in The Bob Newhart Show. He was Jewish and sang in a temple choir.

Haufrect played Dr. Marcus in the 1978 film Coma. He also played the recurring role of Brian in Alice. Haufrect is perhaps best remembered as the announcer in the 1981 film Halloween II, the sequel of the 1978 film Halloween. His character was named Robert Mundy. He formerly appeared in Crisco commercials.

He guest-starred in television programs including Who's the Boss?, Lou Grant, Remington Steele, Family Ties, Perfect Strangers, It's a Living, Head of the Class, Night Court, Growing Pains and Bosom Buddies. Haufrect also appeared in films such as 9 to 5, Love at First Bite, Footloose (as Coach Roger Dunbar), My Man Adam and Twilight Zone: The Movie.

Haufrect played the recurring role of Dr. Harold Chadway in the soap opera television series Dynasty. He also played Dr. Dorman in Days of Our Lives. Haufrect final credit was from the 1994 film There Goes My Baby.

He became an executive at WinCraft. He married Kate McClure Lyman and had a daughter Sarah.

== Death ==
Haufrect died on August 17, 2024, in Century City, Los Angeles, California, at the age of 83.

== Filmography ==
- The Wild Racers (1968) as Virgil
- Coma (1978) as Dr. Marcus
- Kiss Me Goodbye (1982) as Mr. Newman
- Twilight Zone: The Movie as Mr. Conroy's Son
