= The Wild Racers =

1968 film by Daniel Haller, Roger Corman

- Directed by: Daniel Haller; Uncredited: Roger Corman
- Written by: Max House
- Produced by: Joel Rapp
- Starring: Fabian; Mimsy Farmer
- Cinematography: Néstor Almendros; Daniel Lacambre
- Edited by: Dennis Jakob; Ron Silkosky; Verna Fields
- Music by: Mike Curb; Pierre Vassiliu
- Production company: The Filmmakers
- Distributed by: American International Pictures
- Release date: March 27, 1968
- Running time: 80 minutes
- Country: United States
- Language: English

The Wild Racers is a 1968 American film directed by Daniel Haller and starring Fabian, Mimsy Farmer, and Judy Cornwell. The screenplay concerns a Grand Prix racing car driver.

== Plot ==
Stock car racer Jo Jo Quillico goes to Europe after an accident. He is hired by a race-car tycoon to be runner-up for a more experienced racer on the European circuit, working with his mechanic Charlie. However, in his first race, Jo Jo can't help winning.

He has a series of love affairs, including with a shallow Englishwoman, but cannot see himself in a long-term relationship – until he meets Katherine. He falls in love and begins to support his racing-car partner. When his partner is injured, Jo Jo takes his chance and scores several victories. However, he breaks up with Katherine.

== Cast ==
- Fabian as Joe "Jo-Jo" Quillico
- Mimsy Farmer as Katherine Pearson
- Alan Haufrect as Virgil
- Judy Cornwell as Pippy
- David Landau as Ian
- Warwick Sims as Charlie
- Talia Shire
- Dick Miller

== Production ==
The film was partly funded by Roger Corman. Tamara Asseyev was working as Corman's assistant when assigned to help produce the film.

Haller later said, "That movie began when Roger asked me to develop the script with Chuck Griffith. That meant I drove Chuck to Santa Barbara in my car and wouldn’t let him out of the hotel room until he had a certain amount of pages done. Then we went to Palm Springs and he’d dry out there. We finally ended up in La Jolla writing for a day or so there. After a week, we came back with the finished script."

Haller said the original play was to go to Europe. Corman would direct the first unit and Haller would direct second unit – namely, filming all the races on Sunday. However, when he got to Europe, Corman had already shot one of the races and told Haller since that Haller knew the script better than Corman did, Haller should direct first unit while Corman did second unit. Eventually Corman went home for portions of the shoot. Asseyev says Daniel Haller only agreed to direct it if Roger Corman agreed to also finance Haller's pet project, Paddy (1970). The races and cars in the filming were not Formula One but were Formula 2 cars. Formula 2 cars were limited to 1.6 liters, Formula One had 3-liter engines. In this time period, active F1 drivers would also run F2, and other series, to supplement their income. The cars driven by the protagonists were the Roy Winkelmann Brabham BT-23's. In reality, this team featured future World Champion Jochim Rindt, who also drove for Brabham in F1 in this time period.

The Wild Racers was shot in six countries in five and a half weeks with two weeks preparation. Most of the movie was filmed on locations without permission. "We were one step ahead of the law the whole time", says Haller. This was a method which had been used by Corman on The Young Racers (1963). Talia Coppola played the second lead, scouted locations and did the set dressings. During production the film was known as Hell's Racers.

Mimsy Farmer was working in a hospital in Canada when director Dan Haller called asking if she wanted to be in the film. "I jumped at the chance to go to Europe and also to see my brother Philip, who was living in London at the time", she later recalled. "It was the best move I’d made up to then and I loved traveling in France, Spain, and Holland."

The racing advisers were Peter Theobald (English), Jan Pieter Visser (Dutch), Jean Pierre Arlet (French) and Carlos Diego (Spanish).

The movie was shot by Nestor Almendros, and Daniel Lacambre worked as camera operator. Almendros later called the experience on the film influential in his career:

It was an insignificant movie. But the importance of the experience was we learned to work very fast. It's a two fold area; we realized that because you are faster, you are not necessarily worse in cinema; and because you take a long time to prepare something, it's not necessarily going to be better. With every shot you take time somehow; some shots you take longer than with others. But, on the whole, you just have to go ahead and shoot and follow your intuition. Sometimes if you think too much you sort of lose the intuition and the natural flow.

Dan Haller later recalled:

If I didn't think we had gotten a shot, I'd have Nestor shoot it again and have them print both takes. But by the time we got to Paris we were totally exhausted because it was a really grueling schedule and I would never even get to see a location. Talia Coppola was with us on the film and she would be scouting locations for us, and I'd tell her when you get to Rouen, or someplace like that, just go buy all the postcards you can and we'll use that to find our locations. That's how we did a lot of it.

Part of the film was shot in Paris during the 1968 riots and also Spain. Haller said Alemndros, a fugitive from Franco's Spain, was highly anxious during the Spanish leg of the shoot for fear he would be arrested for leaving the country.

Roger Corman said the film included "one of the greatest examples of co-ordinated shooting I've ever been involved with." Corman:

When we were in Paris we wanted a scene by the eternal flame of the Arc de Triomphe. Not only could we not get permission to shoot there, we didn't even have permission to be shooting in France! (laughter) So we worked out a sequence where I was in one car, Nestor was in one car, Chuck Hannawalt was in one car, and the two actors, Fabian and Mimsy Farmer, were in another car. The actors had already rehearsed the scene and we all drove around the Arc de Triomphe and then stopped our cars. We stopped traffic and everyone ran out to get the shot. Nestor put the camera down and Fabian and Mimsy knew exactly where to go. Dan got the shot and we jumped back in our cars and took off.

Peter Gardiner, who had done film effects for Roger Corman on The Trip, provided special effects. One of the lead actors was dubbed by Corman regular Dick Miller, who appears in a cameo. Frances Doel worked as a script supervisor.

Joe Dante who later worked for Corman at New World Pictures said that:

The idea is, the guy went from race to race, and they had to have the races look different. They used blackand-white footage and tinted it several colors. They used stock footage from different pictures. There's hardly a shot in the picture that lasts more than ten seconds. It was like an art film, without being an art film. It was a movie art film.

Almendros wrote "The rushes were interesting, but I think the film was poorly edited. Perhaps this time Haller allowed himself to be influenced bv Lelouch or even Resnais, because The Wild Racers was intellectually pretentious in a way (piite inappropriate for the B movie it really was. It was probably an experiment for Haller, who made a name for himself later on with more successful films." He estimated that Roger Corman directed "about a third" of the film.

== Reception ==
Haller claimed he didn't think AIP "wanted to release the film at all".

Almenderos claimed it "was a fairly ordinary movie. Its script was especially undistinguished. Nor did it have the commercial success we had expected. It was really of use only to the Europeans to whom it had given work. We greatly enjoyed making it."

The Christian Science Monitor called it "unusually well-photographed... the film is aimed at teenagers but thwarts its own purpose by inclusion of too much sexuality."

Variety called it "underplotted, overpadded and inane."

Quentin Tarantino later described The Wild Racers as his favorite racing car film:

It's shot like an Antonioni movie, with very little dialogue, most of which is voice-over. And no shot in the movie lasts more than twenty seconds. The quick edits keep you on the edge of your seat. It's very avant-garde, but it still delivers a proper racing movie. Classy.

== See also ==
- List of American films of 1969
- List of American films of 1968

== Notes ==
- Almendros, Nestor (1984). A man with a camera. Farrar, Straus, Giroux.
