= Alberto Castillo (performer) =

Argentine singer and actor

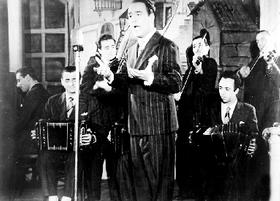
Alberto Castillo

Alberto Castillo

Alberto Castillo (December 7, 1914 – July 23, 2002) (nickname: Riobal) was a prominent Argentine tango singer and actor.

== Career ==
He was born Alberto Salvador De Lucca in the Mataderos district of Buenos Aires, the son of Italian immigrants Salvatore De Luca and Lucia De Paola (from Teggiano, near Salerno). Castillo made his professional debut in the 1930s and began a successful recording career in 1941; his first hit was his cover of the Alfredo Pelala tune “Recuerdo”.

Castillo sang with the orchestras of Julio De Caro (1934), Augusto Berto (1935) and Mariano Rodas (1937) and Ricardo Tanturi (1939).

With his keen sense of rhythm and his tendency to go hoarse, Castillo made a name for himself as the main interpreter of the black-oriented genres of candombe and milonga. One of his most successful recordings was "Cien Barrios Porteños" (The one hundred barrios of Buenos Aires), to the point that presenters would announce him as "the singer of the 100 barrios".

Beginning in 1946, Castillo appeared in a number of Argentine films.

Castillo was also a physician by training. This fact famously convinced his fiancée's parents to let her marry Alberto, because he was "more than just a tango singer", and was used as a plot device in the Argentine movie Moon of Avellaneda (Sp: "Luna de Avellaneda"), where Castillo is summoned to deliver a baby right after finishing his set at a carnival fair (the story is fictitious). Castillo did have a short stint as a sports physician. In December 1951, the Vélez Sársfield soccer team, which he supported, was on a tour of Brazil, and several players came down with heatstroke in Pernambuco, where Castillo was scheduled to perform. A member of the Vélez delegation contacted Castillo, who tended to the players and stayed with the team for the remainder of the tour, rescheduling some of his shows to fit the team's agenda.

Among his later releases was a cover of his candombe hit “Siga el Baile”, recorded with Argentine band Los Auténticos Decadentes. Castillo was the mentor of many other tango artists, such as Silvia Gabriela.

Castillo is buried in La Chacarita Cemetery in Buenos Aires.

== Selected filmography ==
- The Tango Returns to Paris (1948)
