= Lost Horizon (1973 film) =

1973 film by Charles Jarrott

- Theatrical release poster by Howard Terpning
- Directed by: Charles Jarrott
- Screenplay by: Larry Kramer
- Based on: Lost Horizon; 1933 novel by James Hilton
- Produced by: Ross Hunter
- Starring: Peter Finch; Liv Ullmann; Sally Kellerman; George Kennedy; Michael York; Olivia Hussey; Bobby Van; James Shigeta; Charles Boyer; John Gielgud
- Cinematography: Robert Surtees
- Edited by: Maury Winetrobe
- Music by: Burt Bacharach
- Production company: Ross Hunter Productions
- Distributed by: Columbia Pictures
- Release date: March 17, 1973
- Running time: 147 minutes
- Countries: United Kingdom; United States
- Language: English
- Budget: $5.9 million
- Box office: $3.8 million

Lost Horizon is a 1973 musical fantasy adventure drama film directed by Charles Jarrott and starring Peter Finch, Liv Ullmann, Sally Kellerman, George Kennedy, Michael York, Olivia Hussey, Bobby Van, James Shigeta, Charles Boyer and John Gielgud. It was also the final film produced by Ross Hunter. The film is a remake of Frank Capra's 1937 film of the same name, with a screenplay by Larry Kramer. Both stories were adapted from James Hilton's 1933 novel Lost Horizon.

Lost Horizon was lambasted by critics at the time of its 1973 release, but since then it has developed a strong cult following. The film was chosen for a Command Film Performance before Queen Elizabeth, the first American film in seventeen years to receive this honor. It was selected for inclusion in the book The Fifty Worst Films of All Time, co-written by critic Michael Medved, and is listed in Golden Raspberry Award founder John Wilson's book The Official Razzie Movie Guide as one of The 100 Most Enjoyably Bad Movies Ever Made. The film was a box office disappointment in America, but was financially successful overseas.

== Plot ==
The DC3 of a group of travellers is hijacked while fleeing a revolution. The aeroplane crash-lands in an unexplored area of the Himalayas, where the party is rescued and taken to the lamasery of Shangri-La. Miraculously, Shangri-La, (Note: Based on some aspects of Bhutan's culture.) sheltered by mountains on all sides, is a temperate paradise amid the land of snows. Perfect health is the norm, and inhabitants live to very old age while maintaining a youthful appearance.

The newcomers quickly adjust, especially group leader and United Nations Peace Negotiator, Richard Conway. He falls in love with Catherine, a schoolteacher whose parents perished while hiking with her in the mountains. Drug addict photographer Sally Hughes is initially suicidal, but begins counseling with lamas Chang and To Len, eventually finding inner peace. Industrialist Sam Cornelius discovers gold in the local river, but Sally convinces him to use his engineering skills to bring better irrigation to the farmers of Shangri-La instead of smuggling the gold. Harry Lovett is a third-rate comic and song-and-dance man who has a flair for working with the children of Shangri-La.

Everyone is content to stay except Conway's younger brother, George. Shangri-La, despite its utopian allure, has certain expectations of its citizens. Specifically following the mantra of moderation in all things, simplicity and communal existence, as explained by Chang. George has also fallen in love with Maria, a dancer, and wants to take her along when he leaves. Chang warns Richard that Maria came to Shangri-La over 80 years ago, at the age of 20. If she were to leave the valley, she would revert to her actual age.

Richard is summoned to meet the High Lama, who informs him that the plane was hijacked on purpose and that he was brought there for a reason, to succeed him as the leader of the community. The High Lama has been following Richard's actions in the United Nations for years. However, on the night that the High Lama dies, George and Maria insist to Richard that everything the High Lama and Chang have said is a lie. They convince him to leave immediately.

Still in shock from the High Lama's death, Richard leaves without even saying goodbye to Catherine. Not long after their departure, the trio is struggling to keep up with the local guides. As a blizzard starts, an avalanche erupts and kills the party of guides and they are stranded in the storm. Maria suddenly ages and dies, and George, running wildly in grief over the death of his partner, falls to his death down an icy ravine. Richard struggles on alone, ending up in a hospital bed in the Himalayan foothills. The United Nations discovers he has survived and sends a party to take him back to the Western world. However, he runs away, goes back to the mountains, and finds the portal to Shangri-La once more.

== Cast ==
- Peter Finch as Richard Conway
  - Jerry Whitman provides Richard's singing voice.
- Liv Ullmann as Catherine
  - Diana Lee provides Catherine's singing voice.
- Sally Kellerman as Sally Hughes
- George Kennedy as Sam Cornelius
- Michael York as George Conway
- Olivia Hussey as Maria
  - Andra Willis provides Maria's singing voice.
- Bobby Van as Harry Lovett
- James Shigeta as Brother To-Len
- Charles Boyer as the High Lama
- John Gielgud as Chang
- Kent Smith as Bill Ferguson
- John Van Dreelen as Dr. Verden
- Larry Duran as Asian Pilot

== Musical numbers ==
Unusually for a musical film, songs do not feature throughout. As generally released, the film runs for around two hours and fifteen minutes: the first song sung by a cast member, "Share the Joy", appears over 40 minutes in, and the final number, "I Come to You", ends with half an hour running time still left. This led to some critics, notably Judith Crist in Texas Monthly observing that the (largely non-musical) cast fared better when they were not involved in musical numbers.

- "Lost Horizon" (sung by Shawn Phillips over the opening and closing credits)
- "Share the Joy" (Maria)
- "The World Is a Circle" (Catherine, Harry and children)
- "Living Together, Growing Together" (To Len and Company)
- "I Might Frighten Her Away" (Richard and Catherine)
- "The Things I Will Not Miss" (Sally and Maria)
- "If I Could Go Back" (Richard)
- "Where Knowledge Ends (Faith Begins)" (Catherine)
- "Reflections" (Sally)
- "Question Me an Answer" (Harry and children)
- "I Come to You" (Richard)

Large parts of the score were deleted after the film's roadshow release. The dance sections of "Living Together, Growing Together" were cut, and "If I Could Go Back", "Where Knowledge Ends (Faith Begins)" and "I Come to You" were removed, but restored for the laserdisc release. All songs appear on the soundtrack LP and CD. According to the laserdisc notes, Kellerman and Kennedy had a reprise of "Living Together, Growing Together" that was also lost.

Hunter wanted to follow up with another musical, set in 1930s Hollywood, titled Hollywood Hollywood. It was never made.

=== Soundtrack ===
In his 2013 autobiography, Bacharach cites Lost Horizon as very nearly ending his musical career. He stated that the songs worked when taken in isolation, but not in the context of the film. The Bacharach-David partnership, which had been long and both critically and financially successful, was effectively terminated by their experiences working on the score. Bacharach felt that the producers were sanctioning weakened versions of his music, and he attempted to exert greater influence over what was being developed. However, this led to his being banned from the editing suite at Todd-AO. Bacharach felt that he had been left to defend his position alone, and that Hal David had been inadequately supportive. This led to an exchange of lawsuits, destroying their professional relationship. Bacharach's own versions of several of the songs appeared on his album Living Together (1974).

Of the lead actors, only Kellerman, Van and Shigeta perform their own singing. Kennedy was coached by Bacharach but was not used as a vocalist in the finished film. Hussey, Finch and Ullmann were dubbed by Andra Willis, Jerry Whitman and Diana Lee, respectively. Some of the children who provided the singing voices of the Shangri-La children were Alison Freebairn-Smith, Pamelyn Ferdin (a popular child actress of the 1960s and 1970s, who was the original voice of Lucy Van Pelt in the Peanuts animated specials), Harry Blackstone III, David Joyce, and Jennifer Hicklin.

The soundtrack was more successful than the film, peaking at No. 56 on the Billboard 200. Commercially successful singles were issued of both the title song, performed by Shawn Phillips, and "Living Together, Growing Together" by The 5th Dimension, the latter being the band's last top 40 hit on the Billboard pop charts. The song "Things I Will Not Miss" was covered by Diana Ross and Marvin Gaye during recording sessions for the 1973 album Diana and Marvin. Tony Bennett recorded "Living Together, Growing Together" and "If I Could Go Back" for MGM/Verve. Richard Harris sang "If I Could Go Back" to the original musical arrangement made for the movie in the 1973 TV special Burt Bacharach in Shangri-La. Herb Alpert recorded an instrumental cover of "I Might Frighten Her Away" on his album You Smile – The Song Begins.

== Production ==
=== Background ===
Ross Hunter made his name producing remakes at Universal, including Magnificent Obsession and Imitation of Life. Lost Horizon had previously been adapted onstage as Shangri-La in 1956.

In April 1971, after 20 years of association, Hunter departed Universal and set up operations at Columbia where his first film was to be Lost Horizon. In 1971, Hunter said,

Burt Bacharach and I have been talking about doing a picture together for years. But Burt's been saying 'I've made so much money that when I do a movie I want it to last. Then maybe my movie will last.

=== Development ===
Hunter called the film "a picture of hope, of faith with a spiritual quality. We all need that with the pressures of the world... Everyone's looking for a place that has peace and security." Hunter had a role written for Helen Hayes. Julie Andrews was considered for the role of Catherine.

In December 1971, Charles Jarrott signed to direct, with Peter Finch cast in February 1972. March 1972 saw the hiring of Hermes Pan as choreographer.

=== Cast and crew reactions ===
Finch later stated that he enjoyed his time on the film.

Scribe Larry Kramer publicly acknowledged that he is not particularly proud of his workmanlike job adapting the original film's script. However, the deal he engineered for his work on the film—hot on the heels of his Oscar nomination for the screenplay for Women in Love—combined with skilled investments, made it possible for him to live the rest of his creative life free of financial worries. In that sense, this film enabled Kramer to devote himself to the gay community activism and the writings (e.g., his AIDS play The Normal Heart) which came later.

== Critical reception ==
Lost Horizon is considered one of the last of several box-office musical failures of the late 1960s and early 1970s as well as the last musical film to be given the roadshow release, which came in the wake of the success of The Sound of Music. Attempts to update the idea of Shangri-La with its racial inequalities intact, coupled with old-fashioned songs, effectively sealed its fate, according to The New Yorker film critic Pauline Kael. She noted that Shangri-La was depicted as:

a middle-class geriatric utopia [where]...you can live indefinitely, lounging and puttering about for hundreds of years...the Orientals are kept in their places, and no blacks...are among the residents. There's probably no way to rethink this material without throwing it all away.

Julian Fox of Films and Filming raved about the film. "I have to say it, this really is a marvelous film. It's entertaining, the sets really do evoke the spirit of a benevolent Buddha whereas the Capra film gave us an odd mixture of Mandarin and Frank Lloyd Wright...The Himalayan scenes are awe-inspiring-ant-like men plodding in single file across a breathtaking snowscape-the sheer excitement of the uprising in Baskul, the stunning aerial photography and incredible moment the passengers of the crashed aircraft are confronted by the escort party from Shangri-La, moving slowly towards them in the midst of the blizzard is a genuine cinematic feast."

Arthur Knight of Saturday Review acknowledge that "For a new generation, however, imbued with the ideals of peace and love, this LOST HORIZON may prove very satisfying. Its main set, the lamasery, is a distinct improvement over the original, which looked like a Pasadena art museum. Its cast attractive, if not always distinguished. The music is well crafted, if not memorable."

Alan R. Howard of The Hollywood Reporter also liked it. "What's most impressive about Hunter's movie is its technical discipline. Even though the movie is a gigantic production, it has a modest feeling and look. Director Jarrott explores each scene carefully, there's certainly nothing lazy about his work....The Bacharach score is best in light breezy songs...Robert Surtee's photography is never soupy soft-focus. Instead, it is clean, sharp and efficient, free of the cliches of recent musicals".

Boxoffice Magazine reviewed Lost Horizon in its issue of March 19, stating in part: "...As G-rated entertainment with a screenful of stars, lavish sets and song and dance numbers galore, the new film should please a large portion of the population. Critics are apt to turn a scornful eye at the Larry Kramer screenplay, as directed by Charles Jarrott, but this is an audience film in the purest sense. No time is wasted in getting the story under way, producer Hunter having assumed that everyone is familiar with the plot. Peter Finch is an excellent choice for the part of Conway and there are some gems in the casting, most especially Sally Kellerman singing and dancing as the neurotic ex-idealist who finds salvation in Shangri-La and Charles Boyer as the High Lama."

Pauline Kael of the New Yorker gave the film a negative review but also acknowledged that "It's entirely possible that to the nostalgic viewers Ross Hunter is aiming at, this torpor will be soothing".

Roger Ebert of the Chicago Sun-Times gave the film one star out of four and wrote that "it sinks altogether during a series of the most incompetent and clumsy dance numbers I've ever seen." Gene Siskel of the Chicago Tribune awarded one star out of four and wrote that "Nothing works. Not the lyrics, not the sets, not the dancing, not the script, and—with all that going against them—not the actors." Vincent Canby of The New York Times called the film "a big, stale marshamallow" that was "surprisingly tacky in appearance" despite its large budget. Charles Champlin of the Los Angeles Times wrote that the film looked "tacky and uncomfortable" and described the songs as "mechanical and uninteresting." Gary Arnold of The Washington Post wrote that the score "leaves almost no impression and certainly nothing resembling a joyful impression", adding "Even if the songs did make you dance with joy, you'd be dancing alone. With the exception of Bobby Van, a kind of poor man's Donald O'Connor, the cast has no aptitude for singing and dancing."

After derided preview screenings Columbia Pictures attempted to re-cut, but to no avail. Critic John Simon remarked that it "must have arrived in garbage rather than in film cans." Lost Horizon was such a box-office failure that the film gained the nickname "Lost Investment". Bette Midler alluded to it as "Lost Her-Reason" and famously quipped "I never miss a Liv Ullmann musical".

The film was selected for inclusion in the book The Fifty Worst Films of All Time, co-written by critic Michael Medved. The film is listed in Golden Raspberry Award founder John J. B. Wilson's book The Official Razzie Movie Guide as one of The 100 Most Enjoyably Bad Movies Ever Made.

On Rotten Tomatoes, Lost Horizon holds a 14% rating based on seven reviews.

== Box office ==
The film was one of the most popular movies at the British box office in 1973.

Despite being a notorious box office bomb in the United States, the film was a massive success in Japan, becoming the highest-grossing film in the country in both 1973 and 1974. The film grossed $14 million at the time. It was so successful that it grossed more than twice that of the year's second-highest-grossing film, The Human Revolution. It surpassed The Godfather as the highest-grossing film in Japan, holding that position until being overtaken by The Exorcist in December 1974. While it lost millions in the U.S. (earning only $3.5 million), its strong performance in foreign markets like Japan and France ($11.5 million) helped mitigate losses for Columbia Pictures.

== Home media ==
On October 11, 2011, Columbia Classics, the manufacturing-on-demand unit of Sony Pictures Home Entertainment, released a fully restored DVD, which reinstated all of the elements cut after the roadshow release. The DVD also contains supplemental features, including promos featuring producer Hunter as well as the original song demos played and sung by composer Bacharach. Some of these demos contain different lyrics from those in the final versions used in the film.

On December 11, 2012, Screen Archives Entertainment (Twilight Time) issued an exclusive Blu-ray, with a 5.1 lossless soundtrack and an isolated film score.

== See also ==
- 1973 in film
- List of American films of 1973
