= Daniel Lacambre =

American cinematographer

Daniel Lacambre is a cinematographer best known for his work for Roger Corman.

== Select Credits ==
- The Wild Racers (1968)
- The Velvet Vampire (1971)
- The Lady in Red (1979)
- Battle Beyond the Stars (1980)
- The Secret of Sarah Tombelaine (1991)
