= Fernando Díaz (disambiguation) =

Fernando Díaz (fl. 1071–1106) was a Spanish nobleman and military leader.

Fernando Díaz may also refer to:

- Fernando Díaz Alberdi (born 1972), former Argentine rugby union footballer, now coach
- Fernando Díaz (baseball) (1924–1992), Cuban outfielder in Negro league baseball
- Fernando Díaz (count in Lantarón and Cerezo) (fl. 917–924)
- Fernando Díaz Domínguez (1932–1983), Cuban-American artist
- Fernando Díaz (footballer) (born 1961), Chilean football manager and former goalkeeper
- Fernando Díaz de Haro, Spanish noble of the House of Haro
- Fernando Díaz de Mendoza y Aguado (1862–1930), Spanish actor, impresario and theatre director
- Fernando Díaz del Río (born 2003), Spanish artistic swimmer
- Fernando Díaz de la Vega (born 1953), Mexican lawyer and politician

== See also ==
- Fernando Dias (born 1977 or 1978), Bissau-Guinean politician and lawyer
