= Olivia Hussey =

British actress (1951–2024)

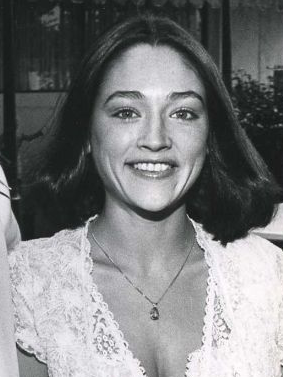
- Hussey in c. 1978
- Born: Olivia Osuna; 17 April 1951; Buenos Aires, Argentina
- Died: 27 December 2024 (aged 73); Los Angeles, California, US
- Occupation: Actress
- Years active: 1964–2018
- Spouses: Dean Paul Martin (m. 1971; div. 1978) Akira Fuse (m. 1980; div. 1989) David Glen Eisley (m. 1991)
- Children: 3, including India Eisley
- Father: Osvaldo Ribó
- Website: oliviahussey.com

Signature
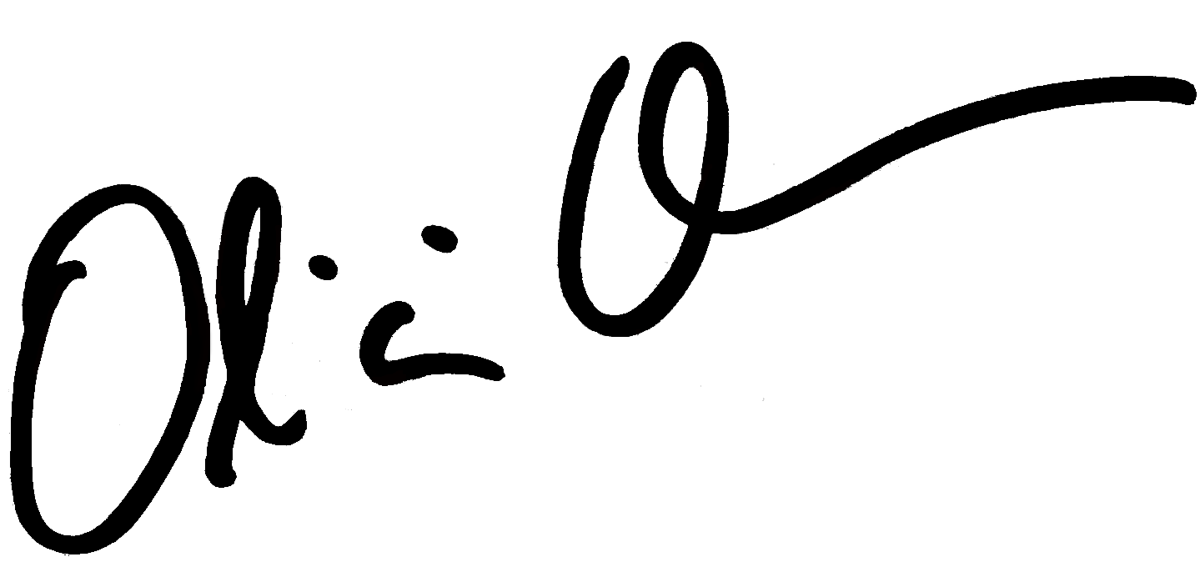

Olivia Hussey (née Osuna; 17 April 1951 – 27 December 2024) was a British actress. The daughter of Argentine singer Osvaldo Ribó and Englishwoman Alma Joy Hussey, Hussey was born in Buenos Aires and spent most of her early life in her mother's native England. She aspired to become an actress at a young age and studied drama at London's Italia Conti Academy of Theatre Arts.

Hussey began acting professionally as an adolescent, appearing in a 1966 London production of The Prime of Miss Jean Brodie. This led to her being scouted for the role of Juliet in Franco Zeffirelli's 1968 film adaptation of Romeo and Juliet, gaining acclaim and wide recognition for her performance. In 1974, she appeared as the lead character Jess Bradford in the cult slasher film Black Christmas. Hussey reunited with Zeffirelli in the miniseries Jesus of Nazareth (1977) as Mary and appeared as Rosalie Otterbourne in John Guillermin's Agatha Christie adaptation Death on the Nile (1978).

Hussey appeared in several international productions throughout the 1980s, including the Japanese production Virus (1980) and the Australian dystopian action film Turkey Shoot (1982). In 1990, she appeared in two horror productions, Stephen King's It and Psycho IV: The Beginning, in which she portrayed Norman Bates's mother. She also worked as a voice actress, providing voice roles in Star Wars video games including Star Wars: Rogue Squadron (1998), Star Wars: Force Commander (2000), and Star Wars: The Old Republic (2011).

== Early life ==
Hussey was born Olivia Osuna on 17 April 1951 in Buenos Aires, Argentina, the first child of Argentine tango singer Andrés Osuna (stage name Osvaldo Ribó) and Joy Hussey, a legal secretary. Her mother was from England, of Scottish and English descent. Her parents were Catholics, and she was raised in that faith. Hussey recalled, "I grew up with a mini-altar at home that [my mother] had; a candle was always alight on it. She always had a great love for God, and she instilled that in me." Hussey was fascinated by acting from a young age, and as a child, would dress up as a nun.

Aged seven, she moved with her mother and younger brother Andrew to London. There, Hussey was accepted into the Italia Conti Academy drama school, which she attended for five years, taking modelling and walk-on parts to help pay her fees. At 13, she began acting professionally on stage, assuming her mother's maiden name as her stage name. In 1964, she appeared in an episode of the television series Drama, followed by minor roles in two films the following year: The Battle of the Villa Fiorita and Cup Fever.

== Career ==
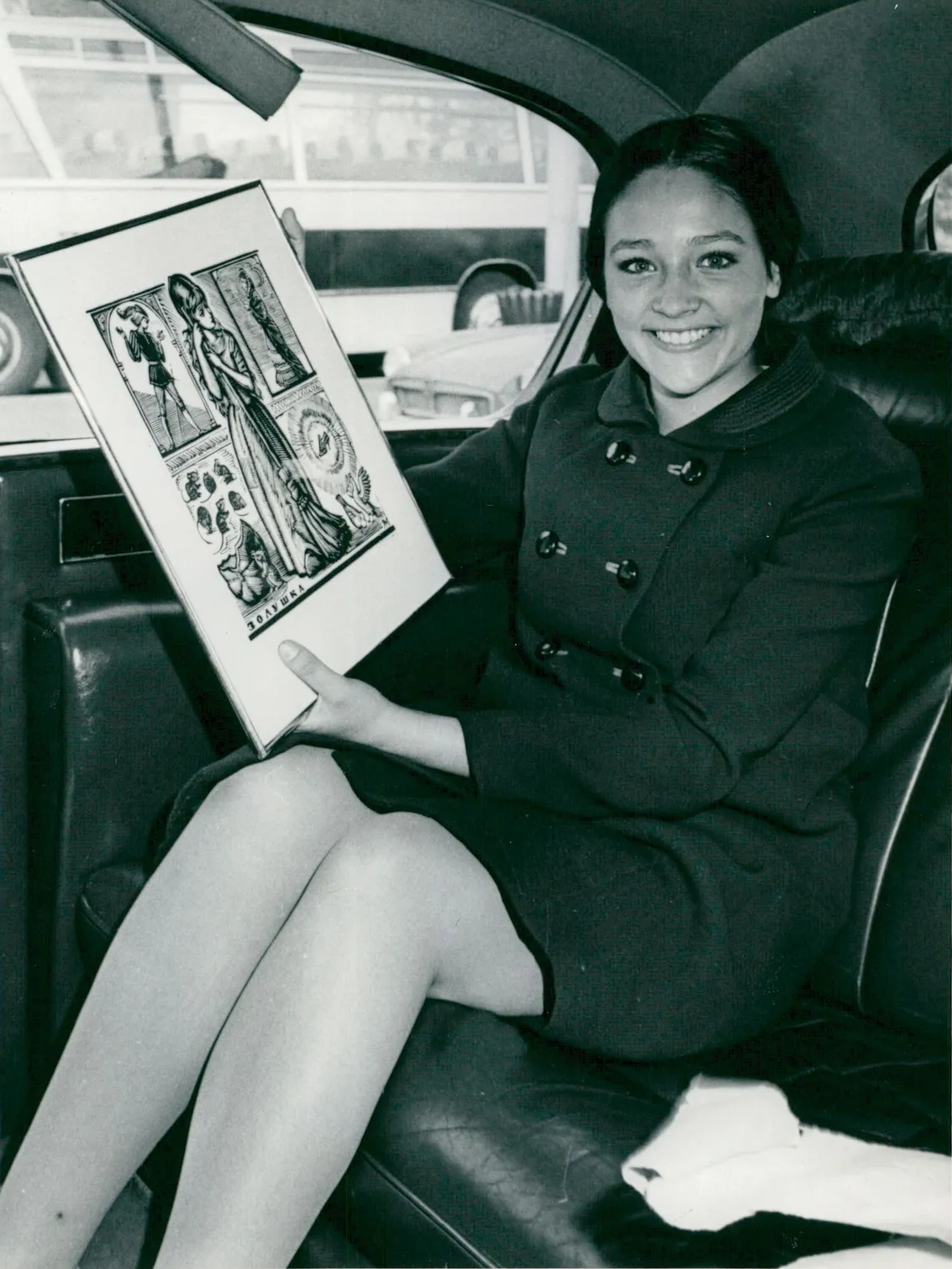
Hussey in 1968

Hussey appeared in a West End production of The Prime of Miss Jean Brodie, playing Jenny opposite Vanessa Redgrave. Italian film director Franco Zeffirelli noticed her performance because "she was the only choice mature enough with experience and natural beauty to play Juliet while still looking 14." She was chosen out of 500 actresses to star in Zeffirelli's Romeo and Juliet film, opposite 16-year-old Leonard Whiting's Romeo. Derek Smith of Slant said Hussey's performance "captures the passion and yearning of love-struck teens in a very contemporary manner". Peter Bradshaw of The Guardian agreed, and said Hussey "has an otherworldly purity". Roger Ebert also gave her and Whiting high praise. She won a special David di Donatello Award and the Golden Globe Award for New Star of the Year – Actress in 1969.

After the success of Romeo and Juliet, Hollywood producer Hal B. Wallis offered her the title role in Anne of the Thousand Days (1969) and the co-starring role with John Wayne in True Grit (1969). In her 2018 memoir, Hussey recalled that she had "mumbled something about being interested in Anne of the Thousand Days" but that she "couldn't see herself with Wayne", concluding that this "adolescent and opinionated" remark ended her professional relationship with Wallis, who immediately withdrew his offer.

In 1971, Hussey appeared in the British drama All the Right Noises, followed by The Summertime Killer (1972), and the musical Lost Horizon. In 1974, Hussey played the lead role of Jess Bradford in the Canadian horror film Black Christmas (1974), which became influential as a forerunner of the slasher film genre of horror films. She played Mary, the mother of Jesus, in the 1977 television production of Jesus of Nazareth (her second work for director Zeffirelli). In 1978, she played Rosalie Otterbourne in Death on the Nile with Peter Ustinov, and appeared in The Cat and the Canary (1979). In 1979, she starred as Esther in the television film The Thirteenth Day: The Story of Esther.

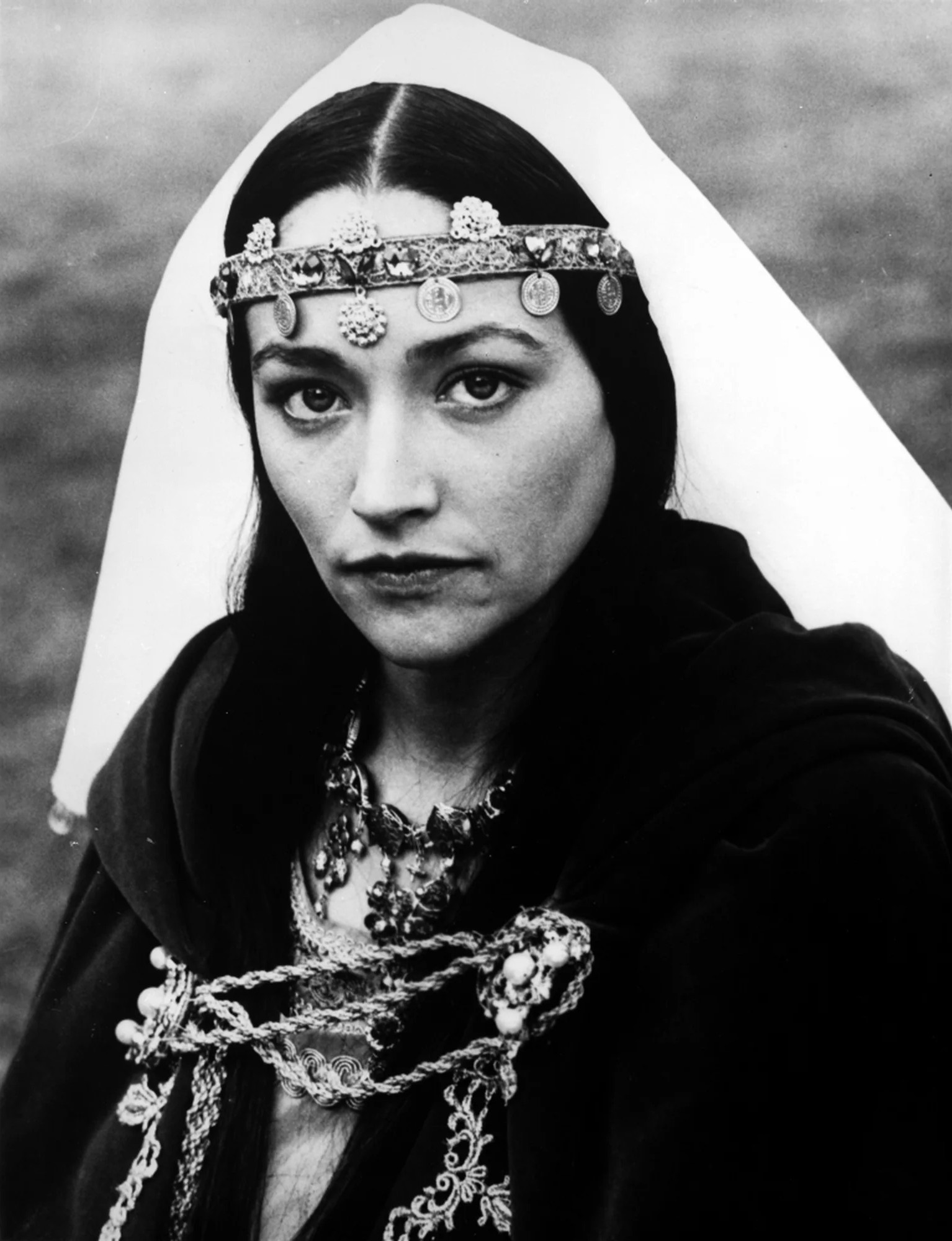
Hussey in Ivanhoe (1982)

She starred as Marit in the Japanese film Virus (1980), and played Rebecca of York in the 1982 remake of Ivanhoe (1982); the same year, she had a lead role in the Australian horror film Turkey Shoot (1982). In 1987, Hussey, along with several well-known actors, made a cameo appearance in a clip for the Michael Jackson video "Liberian Girl". She was next offered the role of Alex Forrest in Fatal Attraction. When she read the screenplay and came across the rabbit in the boiling pot sequence, she was so disturbed that she quickly turned the role down.

In 1990, Hussey played Norma Bates, the mother of Norman Bates, in Psycho IV: The Beginning, a prequel to Alfred Hitchcock's Psycho (1960), and appeared in the miniseries It, an adaptation of the Stephen King novel. These two roles along with Black Christmas earned her the label of scream queen.

Hussey played the lead in Mother Teresa of Calcutta (2003), a biographical film about Mother Teresa, for which she was presented with a Character & Morality in Entertainment Award on 12 May 2007 in Hollywood. She stated in an interview that it had been her dream to portray the role of Mother Teresa of Calcutta ever since she finished her role as the Virgin Mary in Jesus of Nazareth. Hussey later reunited with Whiting as on-screen partners in the film Social Suicide (2015), the only film that they both appeared in since Romeo and Juliet. In the project, Hussey's daughter, actress India Eisley, played their fictional daughter, Julia Coulson.

Hussey also worked as a voice actress, and was nominated for "Outstanding Individual Achievement for Voice Acting by a Female Performer in an Animated Television Production" at the Annie Awards for her work in the DC Animated Universe as Talia al Ghul. She voiced the character of Kasan Moor in the PC/Nintendo 64 game, Star Wars: Rogue Squadron (1998) and was also in the massively multiplayer online role-playing game Star Wars: The Old Republic (2011) as Jedi Master Yuon Par. She also lent her voice to Star Wars: Force Commander in 2000.

Hussey was slated to reprise her role as Jess Bradford in the Black Christmas fan film It's Me, Billy: Chapter 2, but withdrew from the project in November 2023 for health reasons. She was replaced with Lisa Kovack.

== Personal life ==
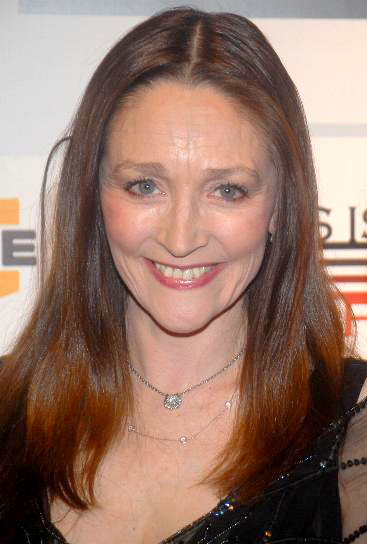
Hussey in 2008

Hussey had agoraphobia, which was aggravated by the fame she achieved after Romeo and Juliet. A memoir, The Girl on the Balcony: Olivia Hussey Finds Life After Romeo and Juliet, was published on 31 July 2018.

=== Relationships and marriages ===
She briefly dated Leonard Whiting in 1968. They remained friends throughout her life, reportedly communicating "at least once every 10 days."

Hussey also dated actor Christopher Jones in 1968 but ended the relationship due to him being abusive towards her. The following year, Jones allegedly attacked, raped, and impregnated Hussey, who underwent an abortion.

Hussey began dating Terry Melcher at some point in 1969, while she lived at 10050 Cielo Drive in Los Angeles after the Manson Murders.

In 1971, Hussey married Dean Paul Martin, the son of Dean Martin. They had one child. They divorced in 1978 but remained friends. Martin died in 1987 when the California Air National Guard F-4 Phantom jet fighter he was piloting crashed.

From 1980 to 1989, Hussey was married to Japanese singer Akira Fuse; the two met while she was filming a commercial in Japan. They divorced after he was unable to find work in the U.S. and she was unable to relocate her first born son, Alexander Gunther Martin, to Japan. They also have one son together, Maximilian Fuse.

In 1991, she married American musician David Glen Eisley, the son of actor Anthony Eisley. They had one daughter, actress India Eisley.

=== Romeo and Juliet lawsuit ===
In an August 2018 interview for Fox News to promote the release of her autobiography Girl on the Balcony, Hussey discussed filming the controversial nude scene in Romeo and Juliet: "We shot it at the end of the film. So by that time...we've become one big family. It wasn't that big of a deal. And Leonard wasn't shy at all! In the middle of shooting I just completely forgot I didn't have clothes on." In another 2018 interview with Variety, Hussey defended the nude scene, saying, "Nobody my age had done that before," adding that Zeffirelli shot it tastefully. "It was needed for the film. Everyone thinks they were so young they didn't realize what they were doing. But we were very aware. We both came from drama schools and when you work you take your work very seriously."

On 30 December 2022, Hussey and Whiting filed a $500 million lawsuit against Paramount Pictures for sexual exploitation, sexual harassment, and fraud, regarding the scene. In their court filing, the two actors stated that they had suffered emotional damage and mental anguish for decades. The complainants stated that director Franco Zeffirelli, who died in 2019, initially said they would wear flesh-coloured undergarments and be positioned in a way that would not show nudity, but that Whiting's bare buttocks and Hussey's bare breasts are nonetheless briefly shown during the scene, in violation of California state and federal laws against indecency and the exploitation of children. The case was dismissed in Los Angeles Superior Court on 25 May 2023.

== Illness and death ==
Hussey was diagnosed with breast cancer in 2008 and underwent a double mastectomy. After being in remission for nearly a decade, the breast cancer returned in 2017, with Hussey undergoing chemotherapy and radiation treatment to remove a small tumour growing between her heart and lungs.

Hussey died at her home in Los Angeles on 27 December 2024, aged 73. Later that day, her Romeo and Juliet co-star Leonard Whiting released a statement: "Rest now, my beautiful Juliet. No injustices can hurt you now. And the world will remember your beauty inside and out forever".

== Filmography ==
=== Film ===
Year	Title	Role	Notes
1965	The Battle of the Villa Fiorita	Donna	
1965	Cup Fever	Jinny (child)	
1968	Romeo and Juliet	Juliet	
1971	All the Right Noises	Val	
1972	The Summertime Killer	Tania Scarlotti	Also known as Target Removed
1973	Lost Horizon	Maria	
1974	Black Christmas	Jessica 'Jess' Bradford	
1976	H-Bomb	Erica	Original title: Dtàt lìam pét
1978	Death on the Nile	Rosalie Otterbourne	
1978	The Cat and the Canary	Cicily Young	
1980	The Man with Bogart's Face	Elsa	
1980	Virus	Marit	
1982	Turkey Shoot	Chris Walters	
1987	Distortions	Amy Marks	
1988	The Jeweller's Shop	Thérèse	
1990	Undeclared War	Rebecca Ecke	
1993	Quest of the Delta Knights	The Mannerjay	Direct-to-video film
1994	Save Me	Gail	
1995	Ice Cream Man	Nurse Wharton	Direct-to-video film
1995	Bad English I: Tales of a Son of a Brit	(unknown)	
1996	The Lord Protector: The Riddle of the Chosen	The Voice of the Ancients	Alternative title: The Dark Mist
1998	The Gardener	Mrs. Carter	
1998	Shame, Shame, Shame	The Therapist	
2000	El grito	Laura Lago	Also known as Bloody Proof
2001	Island Prey	Catherine Gaits	
2005	Headspace	Dr. Karen Murphy	
2006	Seven Days of Grace	Jewel	
2007	Tortilla Heaven	Petra	
2008	Three Priests	Rachel	
2008	Chinaman's Chance: America's Other Slaves	Mrs. Duncan	Alternative title: I Am Somebody: No Chance in Hell
2015	Social Suicide	Mrs. Coulson (Julia's Mother)	Final on-screen role

=== Television ===
Year	Title	Role	Notes
1964	Drama 61-67	Mrs. Ken's Daughter	Series 4; episode 2: "Studio '64: The Crunch"
1966	Take a Sapphire	Child	Television film. Uncredited role
1967	Acting in the Sixties	Jenny	Series 1; episode 1: "Vanessa Redgrave"
1977	Jesus of Nazareth	Mary, Mother of Jesus	Miniseries; episodes 1–4
1978	The Bastard	Alicia	Miniseries; episodes 1 & 2
1978	The Pirate	Leila	Television films
1979	The Thirteenth Day: The Story of Esther	Esther	Television films
1982	Ivanhoe	Rebecca	Television films
1984	The Last Days of Pompeii	Ione	Miniseries; episodes 1–3
1985	The Corsican Brothers	Annamarie de Giudice	Television film
1985	Murder, She Wrote	Kitty Trumbull	Season 2; episode 5: "Sing a Song of Murder"
1990	Psycho IV: The Beginning	Norma Bates	Television film
1990	It	Audra Phillips Denbrough	Miniseries; episodes 1 & 2
1994	Lonesome Dove: The Series	Olivia Jessup	Miniseries; episodes 10, 11 & 13
1996	Dead Man's Island	Rosie	Television film
1997	Boy Meets World	Aunt Prudence Curtis	Season 4; episode 17: "A Long Walk to Pittsburgh: Part 2"
1998	Pinky and the Brain	Queen Gertrude (voice)	Season 3; episode 25; segment: "Melancholy Brain"
1999	Superman: The Animated Series	Talia al Ghul (voice)	Season 3; episode 11: "The Demon Reborn"
2000	Batman Beyond	Talia al Ghul (voice)	Season 3; episode 5: "Out of the Past"
2003	Mother Teresa of Calcutta	Mother Teresa	Television film

=== Video games ===
Year	Title	Role
1998	Star Wars: Rogue Squadron	Kasan Moor
2000	Star Wars: Force Commander	AT-AA Driver, Abridon Refugee 2
2011	Star Wars: The Old Republic	Jedi Master Yuon Par

=== Stage ===
Year	Title	Role	Location	Ref.
1966	The Prime of Miss Jean Brodie	Jenny	Wyndham's Theatre	

== Bibliography ==
- Hussey, Olivia (2018). The Girl on the Balcony: Olivia Hussey Finds Life after Romeo and Juliet. Kensington. ISBN 978-1-4967-1707-8.

== Awards and nominations ==
Year	Award	Category	Nominated work	Result
1969	Golden Globe Awards	New Star of the Year - Actress	Romeo and Juliet	Won
1969	David di Donatello Awards	Golden Plate	Romeo and Juliet	Won
1970	Laurel Awards	Female New Face	Romeo and Juliet	4th place
2001	Annie Awards	Outstanding Individual Achievement for Voice Acting by a Female Performer in an Animated Television Production	Batman Beyond	Nominated
2008	ALMA Awards	Outstanding Performance of a Lead Latino/a Cast in a Motion Picture	Tortilla Heaven	Nominated

== Sources ==
- Daileader, Celia R. (8 October 2001). "Nude Shakespeare in film and nineties popular feminism". In Alexander, Catherine M.S.; Stanley Wells (eds.). Shakespeare and Sexuality. Cambridge University Press. ISBN 978-0-521-80475-2.
- Hussey, Olivia (2018). The Girl on the Balcony. London: Kensington Books. ISBN 978-1-496-71707-8.
- Mayo, Mike (2013). The Horror Show Guide: The Ultimate Frightfest of Movies (2 ed.). Visible Ink Press. ISBN 978-1-578-59420-7.
- Redgrave, Vanessa (1991). Vanessa Redgrave: An Autobiography. New York City, New York: Random House. ISBN 978-0-679-40216-9.
