= Ricardo Tanturi =

Argentine musician

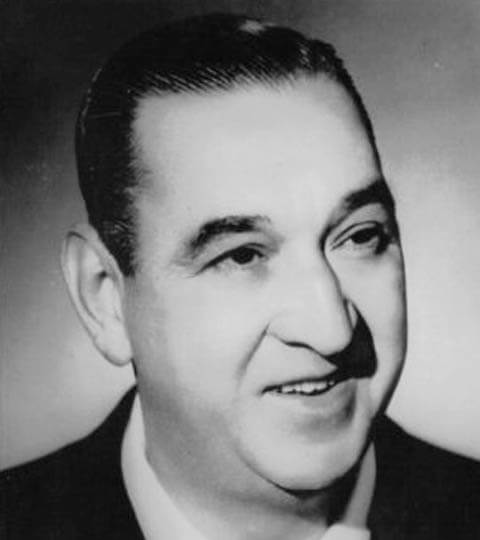
- Ricardo Tanturi

Background information
- Also known as: El caballero del tango
- Born: Ricardo Tanturi; January 27, 1905; Buenos Aires, Argentina
- Origin: Argentina
- Died: January 24, 1973 (aged 67) Buenos Aires, Argentina
- Genres: Tango
- Occupations: Pianist, orchestra conductor, composer

Ricardo Tanturi (27 January 1905 – 24 January 1973) (nickname: El caballero del tango) was a piano player, composer and bandleader (tango musical genre) in Argentina during the Golden Age of tango.

Tanturi's first instrument was the violin, but he later switched to piano. Tanturi started his career in 1924, playing piano at clubs, festivals and radio. Tanturi's great success came in 1939 when he invited Alberto Castillo into the orchestra and they created 37 recordings. In 1943 Castillo left the orchestra, and Enrique Campos joined in his place.

== Compositions ==
Tanturi composed the tangos “Amigos presente,” “A otra cosa, che pebeta,” and “Pocas palabras” with lyrics by Enrique Cadícamo; “Sollozo de bandoneón” with Enrique Dizeo; and “Ese sos vos” with Francisco García Jiménez, among other musical works.
