= Philip Brigham =

Canadian musician

Background information
- Born: 24 January 1952 (age 74); Brantford, Ontario, Canada
- Genres: Rock, blues
- Years active: 1970s–present

Philip (Phil) Brigham is a Canadian rock singer, composer and guitarist.

== Early life ==
Brigham was interested in music from a very early age. He played the saxophone in a school band from 4th to 9th grades. His first major influences were seeing Ricky Nelson on "The Adventures of Ozzie And Harriet" and the Beatles' first appearance on The Ed Sullivan Show in February 1964. He started playing guitar in the autumn of 1966. He took lessons, watched how other people played, whether live or on TV, and listened to a lot of different music.

== Clinic ==
=== Beginnings ===
At the end of his junior year in high school, Brigham moved with his family to Paris, and from 1969 to 1970 attended the American School of Paris. It was in Paris that Brigham met Phil Steele, then known as Phil Trainer. He was a 22- or 23-year-old bass player and vocalist, and he "raided" Philip's high school rock band, taking Phil on guitar, Gerry Murphy on drums, and flute player Chris Hayward. Steele had previously played in Japan and Italy and knew British keyboard player Alan Reeves, then 25 or 26, because Reeves had played in a band called Clinic in both countries, and Phil Steele did some Clinic gigs in Italy. They put together a five-piece band, and because they were British-American, and had some music industry connections, they immediately got signed to a production company, and subsequently were signed to EMI in France.

=== The Road to Salina ===
After signing with EMI France, Reeves' fashion model wife, Albane Navizet, took a bit part in the film The Road to Salina, directed by Georges Lautner. The director had already recruited French pop singer Christophe for a few songs and some orchestral music, but wanted some rock music for the film. He originally wanted Pink Floyd, then popular in Europe though virtually unknown in the U.S., but they were not available, so Clinic got a demo tape together and Albane gave it to Lautner. He liked what he heard. By mostly luck, Clinic were in the right place at the right time, and got the nod to work on the soundtrack. Since the songs were being written individually by Steele, Reeves, or Brigham, or in some combination, they decided to say that all songs were Brigham-Reeves-Steele, to avoid arguments over which songs got shown to the film people. Some of the seven songs used in the film had been written before they saw the sections of film the director wanted music for, but fortunately fit. A few songs, such as "The Chase", were new compositions and really were a collaborative effort between the writers.

=== Developing a musical style ===
When they wrote the music for The Road to Salina, they were in their late teens and early 20s, the band had not been together very long, and they were still developing their musical style. By the time they made their own album Now We're Even (recorded in 1971, released in 1972 in France), they had developed more of a style, which was similar to Santana on instruments and Crosby, Stills and Nash on vocals.

Phil Steele had a pop style, influenced by the likes of the Hollies, the Turtles and the Zombies. Alan Reeves had learned jazz piano from his father when he was a boy, and had become a Hammond organ player in the style of Jon Lord or Keith Emerson. Chris Hayward had studied classical music for flute and recorder, while Gerry Murphy was a jazz fan but also appreciative of the likes of the Band. Phil Brigham had a singer-songwriter style, like Donovan, James Taylor or Neil Young, although since Clinic, other musicians have thought of him more as a rock lead guitarist. Bringing all of those influences together was exciting for the band, but it took them a long time to figure out how it might all fit.

=== The Chase ===
"The Chase" was put together initially as a jam thing that they wrote specifically for The Road to Salina, as opposed to some of the other tunes in that film that were written before it, and they just happened to fit. Phil Brigham started playing "The Chase" by spontaneously playing the guitar riff that opens the tune. Alan Reeves played some rock/classical organ on top of it. At one point, they go to another section with four sustained chords which Alan Reeves came up with, just to get some relief from the repetitiveness of the riff.

=== Scoring a movie ===
Brigham was a senior in high school when Clinic did the soundtrack, and he never saw the totally completed film until later. They would be shown say 1:03 minute's worth of film, and told "put some music of such-and-such type here". When the movie came out, even at age 19, Phil was a little embarrassed at how bad the quality of the production was. The movie was neither a commercial or critical success, but Brigham, Reeves & Trainer all did receive royalties, as the three songwriters from 1972 to 1988. So, while The Road to Salina is admittedly "low budget", Phil Brigham feels that if he never took part in it, he would never have gotten a writing credit years later for the Quentin Tarantino film, Kill Bill Volume 2.

== Back in the United States ==
After Clinic, Brigham came to Boston, Massachusetts to go to the Berklee College of Music. He went on to play in scores of bands, duos, and so forth in the local Boston area. In 1981, along with his then-wife Anne English, he co-wrote and recorded a song that made Boston FM-radio Station WCOZ Best of the Boston Beat Volume 2 album. The duo got some nibbles from A&M Records, but ultimately were passed over.

== Television scoring ==
Brigham has enjoyed some success with original instrumentals placed on television between 1990 and the present: an NBC Sunday night made-for-TV movie called Condition Critical and an ABC Sunday night movie, I Saw What You Did, starring Rosanna Arquette. Also Jerry Springer, Ricki Lake, 20/20, Nickelodeon's The Adventures of Pete & Pete and Lifetime's Intimate Portrait, with Stefanie Powers.

== Kill Bill ==
At first Brigham had no idea "The Chase", from his time with Clinic scoring The Road to Salina, was going to be in a Quentin Tarantino film. When he found out, he was guessing that Tarantino saw The Road to Salina and remembered the parts of it that are kind of impressive, the desert cinematography, for example. In The Road to Salina, they play "The Chase" for the first time in a scene not unlike the way "The Chase" is used in Kill Bill Volume 2, with a car speeding across the desert on its way somewhere. Phil later discovered more about how "The Chase" music got in Kill Bill Volume 2.

"It turns out that Julie Dreyfus, who plays Sofie Fatale in Kill Bill, knew that Tarantino was looking for music, and her father, Francis Dreyfus had the rights to quite a lot of soundtrack music, including The Road to Salina. The soundtrack called "La Route De Salina" was re-released, on CD by Dreyfus Records in 2003. Curiously, there's at least one Clinic song, "Come On Come On" that's in the movie, but not on the LP, and vice versa. A song called "Jacqueline" is on the LP but not in the movie." - Philip Brigham, March 22, 2005
