= Black Dahlia suspects =

Many Black Dahlia suspects, or persons of interest, have been proposed as the unidentified killer of Elizabeth Short, nicknamed the "Black Dahlia", who was murdered in 1947 in Los Angeles, California.

Short was born in 1924 near Boston, Massachusetts. She relocated to California in 1942, hoping to reconnect with her estranged father but she soon distanced herself from him after a series of arguments. For the next few years Short lived a somewhat unstable lifestyle, moving between different lodgings and employment. She lived in Florida for a period, but moved back to southern California for the final six months of her life.

The final confirmed sighting of Short was in Los Angeles on January 9, 1947. Her body was found on the morning of January 15 in an empty lot in the middle-class area of Leimert Park, Los Angeles. The autopsy found that she was killed with a blow to the head and bleeding from severe cuts to her face. After death, Short's body was mutilated: she was drained of blood and carefully bisected at the waist in a manner that led investigators to believe the killer or killers had medical training. She had been killed about 10-12 hours before discovery of her body. Later in January, someone claiming to be the killer mailed some of Short's personal belongings to the Los Angeles Examiner, including her birth certificate and an address book.

Many suspects and conspiracy theories have been advanced, but none have widespread acceptance and some are not taken seriously at all. The murder investigation by the Los Angeles Police Department (LAPD) was the largest since the murder of Marion Parker in 1927, and involved hundreds of officers borrowed from other law enforcement agencies. Sensational and sometimes inaccurate press coverage, as well as the gruesome nature of the crime, focused intense public attention on the case. As the case continues to command public attention, more people have been proposed as Short's killer, much like London's Jack the Ripper murders. LAPD Sergeant John "Jigsaw John" St. John, an LAPD detective who worked the case until his retirement, stated, "It is amazing how many people offer up a relative as the killer."

== Suspects identified by police ==
The following suspects were questioned or screened by LAPD police, and/or mentioned in a 1951 police memorandum by Lt. Frank Jemison. The Jemison list includes about 25 persons of interest in the Short case, but author William J. Mann notes contemporary police files indicate not all 25 were considered strong suspects and some names were listed to show the thoroughness of investigation.

=== Cleveland Torso Killer ===
In the 1930s, there were a series of murders in the Cleveland, Ohio region known as the Cleveland Torso Murders. At least ten victims were killed, and their bodies dismembered and cleaned. There were several suspects but nobody was ever convicted in these crimes.

Cleveland public safety commissioner Eliot Ness received a letter in December 1938, written by someone who claimed to have been the Torso Killer. This letter was postmarked in California, and said the killer had moved to that state where he had killed a woman. The letter's author referred to himself as a "DC", or Doctor of Chiropractic.

This letter led to investigation of possible connections between the Short case and the Cleveland murders, especially given the similarities of dismemberment and detailed cleaning of the victims' bodies. However, no proof was found linking the crimes and Short was not decapitated as were most of the victims in Cleveland.

This suspect was considered by police, but not included on the Jemison list.

=== Carl Balsiger ===
Balsiger met Short when he was stationed at Camp Cook with the US Army, where she worked in the commissary. Balsiger and Short were at least acquainted and his name was listed in her address book, but he denied any serious relationship between them.

He came under suspicion due in part to some evasive or inconsistent answers, and was interviewed by police several times. But LAPD found no firm evidence tying him to Short’s murder. Balsiger was identified on the Jemison list.

In the 2025 book Sisters in Death, author Eli Frankel makes a case that Balsiger killed Short. Balsiger was also a suspect in the 1941 murder of Leila Welsh near Kansas City, Missouri, a crime which shared similarities to the Short murder. Los Angeles police attempted to obtain records of the Welsh murder from Kansas City but were never able to do so due to miscommunication and limitations of technology of the era. Had LAPD investigators received the Welsh file, Frankel believes Balsiger would've been arrested for the crimes against Short.

=== Leslie Dillon ===
In 1949, former mortician Leslie Dillon came under suspicion after writing letters to the Los Angeles Police Department blaming the crime on a friend named Jeff Connors. Dillon's background in embalming and anatomy raised suspicions because Short's body had been surgically mutilated, and some of his answers to police questions were considered indicative of guilt or severe mental disturbance.

Police psychiatrist J. Paul De River became preoccupied with Dillon and believed he was the culprit. De River also believed Dillon suffered from multiple personality disorder and Connors was actually an alternate identity for Dillon.

The situation became controversial when internal LAPD disputes and corruption surfaced in relation to the Dillon accusations. Dillon was eventually arrested on unrelated charges in Kansas, but no solid evidence linked him to Short's murder. Dillon was one of many attention-seeking and/or mentally unstable persons who made false confessions in the Short case.

=== Mark Hansen ===
Hansen was a nightclub owner who had personal contact with Short: they met socially and she briefly stayed at his house on two occasions. He came under suspicion after Short’s friend Ann Toth alleged Short spurned his romantic advances. Hansen had a history of befriending young women who were down on their luck, and supporting them financially in exchange for sexual favors. Hansen was mentioned on the 1951 Jemison list.

He was cleared as a suspect after LAPD found no solid evidence linking him to the crime.

=== George Hodel ===
Dr. George Hill Hodel Jr. came under police scrutiny in October 1949, when his 14-year-old daughter, Tamar, accused him of molesting her. Despite three witnesses testifying that they had seen Hodel having sex with Tamar, he was acquitted in December 1949. The trial led the LAPD to include Hodel, a physician specializing in sexually transmitted diseases, among its many suspects in the Dahlia case.

In 2003, it was revealed in notes from the 1949 grand jury report that investigators had wiretapped George Hodel's home and obtained recorded conversation of him with an unidentified visitor, saying: "Supposin' I did kill the Black Dahlia. They couldn't prove it now. They can't talk to my secretary because she's dead. They thought there was something fishy. Anyway, now they may have figured it out. Killed her. Maybe I did kill my secretary." Hodel was mentioned on the 1951 Jemison list. However, LAPD investigators ultimately cleared Hodel as a suspect after a month-long investigation and they were not able to prove Hodel and Short ever met. George's son Steve Hodel, a former LAPD detective, has written books explaining his belief Short was a mistress of his father, and that his father killed Short and several other victims including those attributed to the Zodiac Killer.

In 2004 author James Ellroy, who wrote a 1987 novel fictionalizing the Short case, endorsed Steve Hodel's theory that George had killed Short. In 2026, author William J. Mann argued against George Hodel as a suspect, noting there was no convincing evidence Hodel had ever met Elizabeth Short. There was a period of about six to eight weeks where Hodel and Short were both in Los Angeles, and police managed to create a nearly comprehensive timeline of her activities and whereabouts in the city, which Mann believed argued against Short being a secret paramour of George Hodel.

=== Robert "Red" Manley ===
Manley came under suspicion as he was one of the last people known to have seen Short alive when he drove her from San Diego to Los Angeles on January 9, 1947. He dropped her at the Biltmore Hotel, and later claimed to have picked up Short (who he considered attractive) to test his loyalty to his wife. Manley was mentioned on the 1951 Jemison list.

LAPD eventually dismissed Manley as a suspect after parts of his story were corroborated, no evidence linking him to the crime could be found, and he passed several polygraph exams.

=== Marvin Margolis ===
Marvin Margolis was identified by LAPD investigators as a key suspect, as he was one of Short's known boyfriends during her time in Los Angeles. Margolis and his friend Bill Robinson happened to meet Short and her female friend. The group struck up a conversation, and Margolis went on a few dates with Short. Additionally, Short lived for about two weeks at the Guardian Arms apartments, the same building where Robinson lived.

Born in 1925, Margolis was an aspiring medical student who served in the US Navy medical corps during the invasion of Okinawa. He worked as a surgeon's assistant and handled the corpses and limbs of dead and injured soldiers, which contributed to his severe mental health problems. He was discharged from the Navy as 50% disabled, and was described in military records as having a history of instability and potential for violence. Margolis did not advance to higher rank in the military, which he attributed to discrimination against his Jewish background. While dating Short, he was a pre-medical student at University of Southern California (USC).

Margolis was mentioned as a suspect on the 1951 Jemison list. He was later eliminated as a suspect after his wife, whom he had recently married, provided an alibi. Author William J. Mann believes a close reading of police files indicated at least some LAPD investigators continued to view Margolis with suspicion in the Short case.

Mann believes Margolis is the most plausible suspect, as Margolis was the only known person who fit the following criteria: he had known contact with Short; he had medical training in anatomy sophisticated enough to account for Short's bisection; he had a history of severe mental disturbance and deep resentment potentially strong enough to motivate the shocking crime; and he had access to a facility where she might have been severed and the blood drained from her body. As a medical student, Margolin could use the USC medical lab, which routinely held cadavers for medical students. Additionally, USC students were on a brief vacation during part of the time Short disappeared and was murdered.

=== Patrick S. O'Reilly ===
The 1951 suspect list by LAPD lieutenant Frank B. Jemison includes Dr. Patrick Shane O'Reilly, an orthopedic surgeon in the Los Angeles area. O'Reilly was considered a suspect because of his association with two friends of Elizabeth Short, including Mark Hanson, having physically assaulted his secretary in 1939, and having surgically removed part of his right breast in similarity to the crime. O'Reilly was also a suspect due to being a skilled surgeon who was earlier credited with saving the life of Lucille La Verne. He also had a prominent scar on his jaw.

In 2023, it was found that O'Reilly had lied about his name and place of birth, actually being Patrick Trear from Kansas. Trear/O'Reilly was found to have a long history of lying to authorities and feeding false stories to the newspapers.

=== “Queer woman surgeon” ===
Investigators looked into rumors Short was lesbian and the crime was committed by a “queer [i.e. lesbian] woman surgeon”.

This allegation was mentioned on the Jemison list. As this theory was based on unsubstantiated rumors, LAPD seems to have regarded this theory as highly unlikely. Mann notes in 1947 there seems to have been only one openly lesbian medical doctor in the state of California - she worked in San Francisco and was highly respected.

== Other suspects ==
The following suspects were identified by authors or investigators separate from the LAPD investigators.

=== Norman Chandler ===
Donald Wolfe's 2005 book The Black Dahlia Files: The Mob, the Mogul, and the Murder That Transfixed Los Angeles names Norman Chandler, publisher of the Los Angeles Times from 1945 to 1960, as a suspect in the murder. In a complicated scenario involving multiple perpetrators, Wolfe claims that Norman Chandler impregnated Short while she was working as a call girl for the notorious Hollywood "madam" Brenda Allen, which led to her murder at the hands of gangster Bugsy Siegel.

=== George Knowlton ===
Little reliable information is available on George Knowlton, except that he lived in the Los Angeles area at the time of the Black Dahlia murder and died in an automobile accident in 1962.

In the early 1990s, George Knowlton's daughter Janice began claiming that she had witnessed her father murdering Elizabeth Short, a claim she based largely on "recovered memories" that surfaced during therapy for depression after a hysterectomy. Based on these recovered memories, Knowlton published Daddy Was The Black Dahlia Killer with veteran crime writer Michael Newton in 1995. In the book, Knowlton, a former professional singer and owner of a public relations company, alleged that her father had been having an affair with Elizabeth Short and that Short was staying in a makeshift bedroom in their garage, where she suffered a miscarriage. George Knowlton allegedly murdered Short in the garage and bisected her in the sink, then forced his then ten-year-old daughter Janice to accompany him when he disposed of the body. According to Knowlton, Short was a sex worker and a procurer of children for a child trafficking ring. Knowlton claimed that a former member of the Los Angeles Sheriff's Department told her that her father was considered a suspect in the case by that agency, but this claim is unsupported by the public documents that have been released in the case. She claimed the same source told her that future LAPD chief and California politician Ed Davis and Los Angeles County District Attorney Buron Fitts were suspects in the murder as well. The Los Angeles Times wrote in 1991:

Los Angeles Police Detective John P. St. John, one of the investigators who had been assigned to the case, said he has talked to Knowlton and does not believe there is a connection between the Black Dahlia murder and her father. "We have a lot of people offering up their fathers and various relatives as the Black Dahlia killer," said St. John, better known as Jigsaw John. "The things that she is saying are not consistent with the facts of the case.

Nevertheless, Westminster, California police took her claims seriously enough to dig up the grounds around her childhood home there, looking for evidence. They found nothing to tie George Knowlton to any crime.

On March 5, 2004, Janice Knowlton died of an overdose of prescription drugs in what was deemed a suicide by the Orange County, California, coroner's office.

=== Bugsy Siegel ===
Los Angeles mobster Benjamin "Bugsy" Siegel was allegedly a suspect in the murder investigation of Short. The reason why he was a suspect is unclear, especially since Siegel was more concerned with the Flamingo Hotel and Casino at the time and he was known to be a "lady's man" not a "lady's killer." Also, Siegel was involved with Chicago Outfit starlet, and his on-off girlfriend, Virginia Hill. Still, according to Don Wolfe's book The Black Dahlia Files: The Mob, the Mogul, and the Murder That Transfixed Los Angeles, Siegel was the actual murderer. It has also been surmised that if Siegel had any involvement with the Dahlia murder, he would have sent Mickey Cohen or one of his other henchmen. Yet another theory was that the murder may have been an attempt to frame Siegel by Jack Dragna, who wanted revenge for Siegel's attacks on Dragna's business interests since his arrival in the 1930s.

=== Jack Anderson Wilson (a.k.a. Arnold Smith) ===
Wilson was a lifelong petty criminal and alcoholic who was interviewed by author John Gilmore while Gilmore was researching his book Severed. After Wilson's death, Gilmore named Wilson as a suspect owing to his alleged acquaintance with Short.

Prior to Wilson's death, however, Gilmore made an entirely different claim to the Los Angeles Herald-Examiner in a story appearing January 17, 1982. In this 1982 article Gilmore blamed Short's murder on a Chicago-based mobster given the pseudonym "Mr. Jones'. Asked for response to Gilmore's 1982 theory, LAPD detective John "Jigsaw John' St. John was quoted as saying Gilmore's ideas were "premature' and needed more verification.
