= Eatwell =

Eatwell is a surname. Notable people with the surname include:

- Brian Eatwell (1939–2007), British art director
- John Eatwell, Baron Eatwell, (born 1945), British economist
- Piu Eatwell (born 1970), British-Indian author
- Roger Eatwell, British academic
- Luke Eatwell, English professional wrestler better known by the ring name Zack Sabre Jr.

== See also ==
- Eatwell plate, pictorial summary of the main food groups and their recommended proportions for a healthy diet
