= John P. St. John =

John P. St. John may refer to:

- John St. John (American politician) (John Pierce St. John, 1833–1916), Governor of Kansas
- John P. St. John (police officer) (1918–1995), Los Angeles Police Department homicide detective
