= Somebody Knows (radio show) =

- Genre: True crime, docudrama
- Running time: 30 minutes
- Country of origin: United States
- Language: English
- Home station: CBS Radio
- Created by: Jimmy Saphier
- Written by: Sidney Marshall
- Directed by: James Sasser, Jack Johnstone
- Original release: July 6 – August 24, 1950
- No. of episodes: 8

Somebody Knows is a true crime, docudrama style radio show broadcast in July and August 1950 on CBS Radio whilst the popular mystery series Suspense took a break over the summer. It is best known for featuring the Black Dahlia murder case.

== Synopsis ==
Each episode showcases an unsolved murder. Unlike previous "based on fact" radio dramas, the scripts stayed true to real-life facts with no embellishments or name changes. A $5,000 reward is offered every week for information leading to the killer's conviction.

== Production ==
Somebody Knows was created by Jimmy Saphier to fill the Thursday night slot normally held by the popular show Suspense, whilst it took its summer break. He was inspired by the Chicago Sun-Times who had recently run a series appealing for information on cold cases. Saphier was unable to find a sponsor, so he put up $40,000 of his own money for the reward fund for all eight episodes, a fact that was widely used to promote the show leading up to its broadcast. He was quoted saying: "I don't care if we only have one listener, as long as he's the guy who knows who did it - and will rat on his pal." Saphier was dubbed "the man who wants to lose $40k".

The show was a direct competitor for NBC's show Wanted, another summer cover show with a similar concept. Somebody knows was written by Sidney Marshall and it was directed by James Sasser and the prolific Jack Johnstone, who also narrated the show.

== Episodes ==
#	Date	Case	Summary	Case Status
01	July 6, 1950	Gladys Kern		
02	July 13, 1950	Mary Agnes Kabiska	The body of 28 year old Mary Agnes Kabiska was found lying in the snow in an alleyway behind Tuscarora Ave, in Saint Paul, Minnesota on the morning of January 15, 1950. She had died of slash wounds to her neck and wrist. Kabiska was last seen just after 11pm alighting a bus just around the corner from her home after attending ballet performance at the Northrop Auditorium. The case was quickly linked to that of Geraldine Mingo, another young woman murdered in an almost identical fashion in 1948 and police concluded a serial killer was at work.	Both the cases of Kabiska and Mingo remain unsolved.
03	July 20, 1950	Joseph P. Bohanak		
04	July 27, 1950	Frank J. Christenson		
05	August 3, 1950	Paula Kohler Eubanks	Paula "Polly" Kohler Eubanks was a 26-year-old waitress who was abducted from the steps outside her lodgings in Kansas City, in the early hours of June 26, 1947. She was sitting on the steps with 22-year-old Hector Mendoza, whom had just taken her out on a date, when the pair were accosted by a man with a gun. Hector was knocked out by the gunman and when he awoke, Polly was gone. Shortly after, a caretaker of an abandoned city dump was awoken by an armed man at his window ordering him to stay in the shack. The caretaker obeyed and listened as a violent scuffle occurred in a nearby abandoned outbuilding, and a girl crying "Honey, don't kill me". After hearing a car leaving the scene, the caretaker alerted the police, who upon searching the outbuilding, found the brutally beaten body of Polly Eubanks concealed under a pile of trash. Despite a widespread investigation into Eubanks' life and associates, no suspects or potential motive could be found.	Solved. In 1974 Kansas city police closed the file on the case, after a woman came forward claiming her estranged husband was the killer. She shared intimate knowledge of the killings, including personal items taken from Eubanks and police concluded that her husband was indeed most likely the killer. However, it was discovered he had died in 1973 and out of respect to his family, police have never publicly named the man.
06	August 10, 1950	Samuel I. Paris	Samuel I. "Sammy" Paris was a 39 year old cab driver from Dorchester, Boston who was murdered on the night of April 3, 1948 after picking up a lone male passenger at 10:25pm in downtown Boston. When his taxi cab crashed into a parked vehicle on Norfolk Ave., it was initially assumed Paris had been killed on impact, despite a man being witnessed fleeing the scene by residents. It was not until his body had been removed from the scene that a medical examiner discovered a fatal .22 calibre bullet wound to the back of his head. Police suspected the killing happened in a botched robbery attempt. Despite no money being taken, it was discovered his wristwatch was concealed halfway up his sleeve, indicating Paris suspected he was about to be robbed. It is believed he deliberately crashed the car before being shot. Despite initial arrests of four youths caught stealing a car and found to be carrying a weapon of the same calibre, they were later cleared by ballistics.	Unsolved.
07	August 17, 1950	Jean Croyle Long	Jean Long was a 40-year-old woman living in Detroit, Michigan. She had recently separated from her husband and dedicated a great deal of her time doing secretarial duties and other volunteer work for her church, the Twelfth Street Evangelical. On May 23, 1944 Long stayed behind late and alone at the church to complete a bulletin for wartime servicemen. At 9pm 48-year-old Alex Simpson, a travelling salesman from Chicago, arrived at the church to collect Long for a date they had arranged, but found the church office empty. Long's mother reported her missing at midnight that night when she did not return home. The following morning Long's body was discovered by Rev. Newell Liesemer in the church nave. She had been stabbed to death and her beaten face was covered by the news bulletin she had been working on. She had not been sexually assaulted, and police believed the crime had been committed by someone she knew. A paring knife was in a drawer in the church's kitchen, and traces of blood were found on the blade and in the sink where the killer had cleaned it. Part of a man's torn fingernail was also found at the crime scene which also bore traces of Long's blood. Kenneth Long and Alex Simpson were both initially detained by police, however both were shortly released when no evidence or motive could be found against them.	Unsolved.
08	August 24, 1950	Elizabeth Short	Elizabeth Short, age 22, was a young drifter living in Los Angeles, California. On January 15, 1947, her posed and mutilated body was discovered in an empty lot South Norton Avenue. At first a Jane Doe, she was identified by fingerprints from a former underage drinking arrest. A witness had seen a suspicious man appear to dump something from an old sedan car at 6:45am that morning. Suspicion initially fell on Robert "Red" Manley, an acquaintance of Short's who had given her a lift to Los Angeles from San Diego on January 9, the last day she was seen to be alive. No evidence was found indicating Manley and he was quickly cleared. Short's purse and shoes were found stuffed in a trash can behind a cafe not far from where her body was found. On January 21, editor of the Los Angeles Examiner James Richardson received a call believed to be from the killer of Short, promising to send some of her belongings to the newspaper. On January 24, the newspaper did receive a package containing several items belonging to Short, however these yielded no useful clues.	The case remains unsolved and is considered one of the most notorious unsolved crimes in American history.
