= Agness Underwood =

American journalist and newspaper editor (1902-1984)

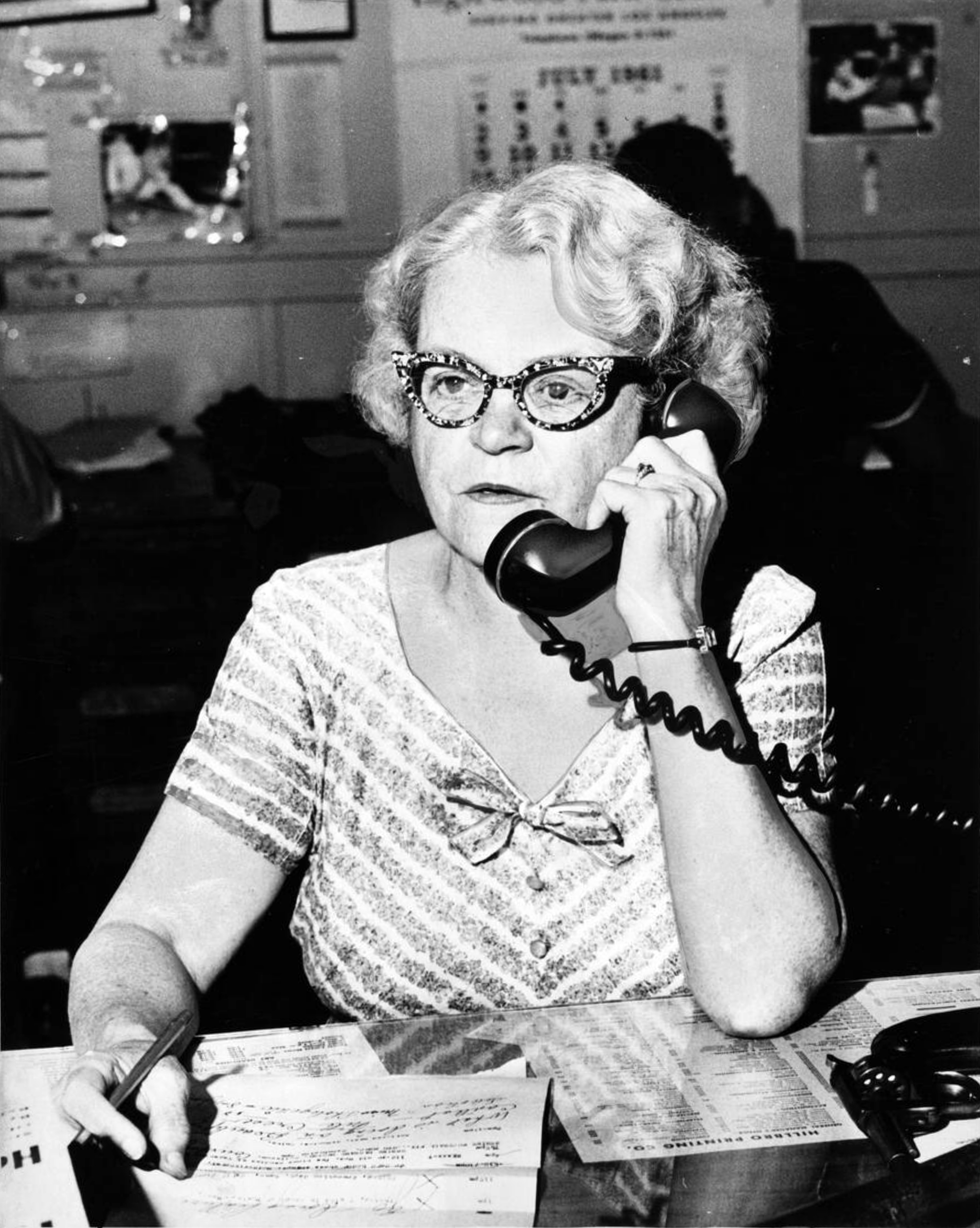
- Underwood in 1961
- Born: Agnes May Wilson; December 17, 1902; San Francisco, California, United States
- Died: July 3, 1984 (aged 81); Greeley, Colorado, United States
- Resting place: Forest Lawn Memorial Park, Glendale, California
- Occupations: Newspaper reporter, editor
- Years active: 1926–1968
- Spouse: Harry Underwood (m. 1920–1943; divorced)

Agness May Underwood (née Wilson; December 17, 1902 – July 3, 1984) was an American journalist and newspaper editor and one of the first women in the United States to hold a city editorship on a major metropolitan daily. She was preceded by Laura Vitray who became city editor of the New York Evening Graphic in 1930 and by Mary Holland Kinkaid who was city editor at the old Herald, likely in the early 1900s. She worked as a reporter for the Los Angeles Record from 1928 to 1935, the Herald-Express from 1935 to 1962 and the Herald-Examiner from 1962 to 1968.

== Life and career ==
Agnes May Wilson was born in San Francisco, California, to Clifford Wilson, a journeyman glass-blower, and Mamie Sullivan Wilson, a housewife. Underwood would adopt the distinctive double "s" at the end of her first name in 1920. Underwood was the elder of two daughters. The Wilson family's frequent moves were determined by where Clifford could find work. In November 1907, Mamie died in childbirth. Clifford's work required him to travel, which made it impossible for him to care for the girls on his own. Underwood and her younger sister were handed over to relatives in Terre Haute, Indiana, to be raised. Underwood recalled that she and her sister did not stay in Terre Haute and that they moved frequently, often winding up in the hands of public charity.

Clifford became distressed with the way his daughters were being treated and found two foster homes in Portland, Indiana, each willing to take one of the girls. Underwood's sister was sent to live with a farm family. Underwood's new home was with Charles and Belle Ewry and their three sons. She and the eldest of the three sons, Ralph, liked each other immediately. Ralph Ewry became her friend and protector. Underwood later described the Ewry household as a serious environment, made bearable only by Ralph's kindness.

Underwood did well in school and skipped three grades; however, by the time she entered high school in 1916 her enthusiasm for her studies had waned and she dropped out in the tenth grade. Underwood took as job as a clerk in the basement of Cartwright's department store in Portland, Indiana. She became increasingly unhappy living with the Ewrys, particularly following Ralph's deployment overseas as a soldier during World War I. Ralph sensed Underwood's discontent in her letters to him and, believing that she might be better off with a blood relative, managed to locate one of her distant relatives in San Francisco.

Underwood arrived in San Francisco in November 1918, and moved in with her relative who lived in an apartment on Geary Street. Underwood knew she would be expected to contribute to household expenses and set out to find a job. After a few frustrating days of unsuccessful job hunting, she arrived at the apartment only to discover that her relative had moved out leaving Underwood broke, alone, and homeless.

Another of Underwood's female relatives invited her to move to Hollywood, California, and live with her. Soon after her arrival it became clear that Underwood's relative was interested only in transforming the girl into a child star. When that plan failed, the relative put Underwood out on the street.

Underwood became a resident at the Salvation Army's home for working women in downtown Los Angeles and got a job at the Broadway Department Store. It was there that she met Evelyn Conners, a woman a few months her junior, who would become her lifelong friend.

Following a brief move to Salt Lake City, Utah, Underwood returned to Los Angeles, where she found work as a waitress at the Pig 'n Whistle restaurant in downtown Los Angeles. One day in April 1920, she was lamenting to Harry Underwood, a co-worker, that her Hollywood relative had resurfaced and demanded that Underwood live with her again and relinquish her paychecks to her, or she would turn the underage girl over to the authorities. Harry told her that the relative could not do that if he and Underwood were married. The couple married three weeks later on April 28, 1920.

By 1926, Underwood and her husband had become parents to a daughter and son. Underwood's husband and sister worked outside the home, but the family still struggled to make ends meet. One of the small economies that Underwood practiced was to wear her sister's hand-me-down silk stockings. One day Underwood asked her husband for the money to buy a new pair of stockings, but he demurred. An argument ensued and Underwood told her husband that if he would not give her money for stockings, she would get a job and earn them herself.

In her autobiography, Newspaperwoman (Harper Brothers, 1949), Underwood said that she did not want to work outside the home, and that she had no idea where to look for a job. As it turned out, a job found her. The day following the stockings argument Underwood's friend, Evelyn Connors, called and asked her if she would be interested in a temporary job on the switchboard at the Record. Underwood seized the opportunity, and thus began her career in the newspaper business.

== Los Angeles Record ==
In October 1926, Underwood began her job as the switchboard operator at the Los Angeles Record. It was at the Record that Underwood learned the newspaper business from the ground up. She was a quick study and worked hard at any task to which she was assigned. She assisted Gertrude Price, who wrote a woman's column under the pseudonym of Cynthia Grey, in the Christmas basket program for the poor. Price recognized Underwood's innate talent and became Underwood's mentor. In December 1927 William Edward Hickman kidnapped, murdered, and then butchered twelve-year-old Marion Parker. Hickman was on the run when Underwood saw the United Press flash that he had been captured in Oregon. Underwood telephoned her husband with the news. Price overheard the call and reprimanded Underwood for talking about a story outside of the newsroom before it was in print. Underwood never made that mistake again.

Underwood worked her way up to reporter at the Record, and her first byline was an interview with an elderly man who was credited with having planted the first cotton in California.

Underwood's first major crime reporting began on May 20, 1931, when Los Angeles was shaken by the murders of Charles H. Crawford and Herbert F. Spencer. Crawford was a former saloon keeper and was a power behind the scenes in the city's government. Spencer was a former police reporter who had become associated with the Critic of Critics, a political crusading weekly. The day following the murders thirty-three-year-old David H. Clark, a former deputy district attorney and candidate for municipal judge, surrendered himself to the district attorney and admitted to the murders.

Underwood had noticed a couple of gaps in the coverage of the murders. She thought it odd that no one had interviewed Clark's parents. Underwood managed to locate them and they gave her an exclusive interview and photographs. Underwood's interview with Clark's parents appeared in the paper under the headline "Mrs. Clark Says Son is Innocent", earning her a double column byline.

Underwood was given an increasing number of major stories to cover for the Record, and her reputation as a reporter grew. She was offered a job at William Randolph Hearst's Herald-Express, but she turned it down. The Herald-Express expected her to provide her own automobile, but she did not own a car. In addition, she felt that she was gaining valuable experience in every aspect of the newspaper business at the perennially short-staffed Record, and she worried that she would be more constricted at the Herald-Express.

Early in January 1935 the Herald-Express again offered Underwood a job. She had decided to decline the offer when a couple of days later she learned that the Record had been sold to the Illustrated Daily News. Despite assurances that her position would be safe, Underwood decided to accept the offer to work for the Herald-Express.

== Herald-Express ==
Underwood's first assignment for the Herald-Express was to interview Amelia Earhart. The aviator had successfully completed a historic solo flight from Honolulu, Hawaii, to Oakland, California. Underwood staked out Earhart's North Hollywood home for several hours before she turned up. The interview was worth the wait; Underwood discovered that she was the only Herald-Express reporter who had caught up with Earhart.

Three weeks after she began working at the Herald-Express, Underwood drew photographer Perry Fowler for a story on the rape of a sixteen-year-old girl. Underwood and Fowler worked together regularly after that and were unofficially regarded as a team. They made the early morning rounds (called "milk runs") of local jails. They visited the Lincoln Heights Jail almost daily, ferreting out crimes and scandals on which to report.

Among the stories Underwood covered over the next twelve years were the untimely deaths of Hollywood stars Thelma Todd (whose autopsy she attended) and Jean Harlow. She wrote a series of articles on the lives of the women incarcerated in the California women's prison at Tehachapi, and she would report on nearly every major murder case in the city, culminating with the infamous murder of twenty-two-year-old Elizabeth Short in January 1947. She also reported on the case of Nellie May Madison who was convicted of shooting and killing her husband on March 24, 1935. At first Underwood assumed Madison was guilty because she was married five times and produced no children from the marriage. She eventually became an advocate for Madison and garnered outcry of letters which had Madison's conviction from death to life in prison.

On January 15, 1947, the bisected body of a young woman was found in Leimert Park near Thirty-Ninth and Norton. According to Underwood, she was the first reporter to arrive at the body dump site. The dead woman was soon identified as Elizabeth Short from Medford, Massachusetts. Underwood stated in her autobiography, Newspaperwoman, that the popularization of Short's "Black Dahlia" nickname was the result of information she had received from a Los Angeles Police Department homicide detective.

In the midst of reporting on the Black Dahlia case, Underwood was promoted to city editor of the Herald-Express. Underwood said that she had been pulled from reporting on the case twice, each time without warning, or explanation. The second time she was informed that her new assignment was as editor of the city desk.

Wielding a sawed-off baseball bat and a starter pistol, Underwood ran a staff of hard-nosed reporters and photographers who called her "Aggie" (the nickname she had acquired while working at the Record) until her retirement in 1968.

== CBS lawsuit ==
On April 22, 1981, Underwood's attorney, Caryl Warner, filed a $110 million defamation lawsuit against author Ovid Demaris and publisher Times Books over a passage in The Last Mafioso. The book related the life story of mobster Jimmy "The Weasel" Fratianno. The contested passage referred to an incident in the late 1940s involving gangster Mickey Cohen. According to Fratianno, Cohen had pocketed $1 million from contributors to the Israeli cause by planting a false story in the Herald-Express stating that the ship carrying the money had gone down at sea. Fratianno was quoted as saying:

"[Cohen's] got this broad at the Herald, Aggie Underwood. She's a big editor there and this broad would walk on hot coals for Mickey. Prints any shit he gives her. The way I see it, Mickey called her and made up a story about buying guns and ammunition for the Jews and told her the boat sank."

Fratianno repeated the story to interviewer Mike Wallace on the CBS television show 60 Minutes, and the lawsuit was expanded to include Wallace et al.

According to Underwood, she did not know Cohen until the early 1950s, a few years after the alleged incident. Underwood never denied being friends with Cohen, and she admitted that he was often a news source; in fact, Cohen had obtained the Lana Turner-Johnny Stompanato letters for Underwood after Turner's daughter, Cheryl, had been indicted for the stabbing death of Stompanato on April 4, 1958.

Underwood died before the lawsuit could go to trial. The suit was later dropped by her family.

== Later life and death ==
In 1981, and in failing health, Underwood moved from Los Angeles to Greeley, Colorado, to live near her son and grandchildren. On July 3, 1984, she had a fatal heart attack. Underwood's funeral was held at St. James Episcopal Church in downtown Los Angeles on July 7, 1984.

Following her death, Underwood was eulogized in all of the local newspapers. The Herald-Examiner said:

"She was undeterred by the grisliest of crime scenes and had a knack for getting details that eluded other reporters. As editor, she knew the names and telephone numbers of numerous celebrities, in addition to all the bars her reporters frequented. She cultivated the day's best sources, ranging from gangsters and prostitutes to movie stars and government officials."

Underwood is buried at Forest Lawn Memorial Park, Glendale, California, in the Court of Freedom, Sanctuary of Affection, crypt 1239.

== Filmography ==
On November 11, 1956, Underwood was the subject of an episode of the television program This Is Your Life. She was also the subject of a 2017 film documentary entitled Agness Underwood: First Lady of the Newsroom.

== Honors and awards ==
- March 31, 1949. Woman of Achievement Award, American Legion, Los Angeles County Council and its Auxiliary.
- July 27, 1949. National Headliner Award, for outstanding achievement in journalism, Theta Sigma Phi, at its national convention, Dallas, Texas.
- April 15, 1950. A guest of honor, annual banquet, Women's National Press Club, Washington, D.C.
- August 11, 1951. Honorary degree, Master of Business Administration, Woodbury College, Los Angeles.
- February 16, 1952. Golden Flame Award (first to be presented), California Association of Press Women.
- January 12, 1956. Trophy, for "outstanding achievement", "Life Is What You Make It", Columbia Broadcasting System television program.
- January 4, 1957. Citation, for "success in her chosen field of journalism", Los Angeles Commandery, Knights Templar.
- May 9, 1957. Citation, American Legion, District 17, California.
- May 16, 1957. Sister Pin Award, Delta Phi Epsilon foreign service fraternity.
- June 12, 1957. Outstanding Achievement Award, Women's Graphic Arts Club, Los Angeles.
- June 1957. Honorary Commander and Award, Port of Los Angeles, Board of Harbor Commissioners.
- June 12, 1958. Los Angeles City Council scroll containing copy of resolution passed unanimously, for outstanding service...to...journalism generally...and...her leadership...in numerous projects...for betterment of Los Angeles..."
- June 20, 1958. Honorary degree. Doctor of Laws, College of Osteopathic Physicians and Surgeons, Los Angeles.
- January 17, 1959. One of 348 Los Angeles Women listed in first edition of "Who's Who of American Women".
- December 13, 1960. Silver cup award as one of Los Angeles Times "women of the year". This was the Los Angeles Times' first award for journalism."
- March 26, 1961. President's annual award, B'nai B'rith Girls of Southern California. "...for inspiration to teenage girls".
- July 28, 1961. "Newspaperwoman of the Year" guest of honor, Greater Los Angeles Press Club banquet.
- June 28, 1962. Medallion Award as "The Most Outstanding Woman in Journalism", National Federation of Press Women, convention, Denver, Colorado.
- July 7, 1962. Award of Merit, Military Order of the Purple Heart, Department of California.
- July 18, 1962. Mayor Samuel W. Yorty proclaimed "Aggie Underwood Day" in Los Angeles. Los Angeles City Council unanimously passed resolution designating "Aggie Underwood Day". The official documents were recorded in an illuminated, hand-lettered, leather-bound book presented to her.
- January 18, 1963. Humanitarianism Award, Los Angeles Cancer Prevention Society, for "...inspiring exemplification of dedicated service to the health and welfare of the community."
- April 20, 1963. Citation, "...in honor of her many achievements" and hailing her as "this nation's most outstanding newspaperwoman", Pacific Region, Soroptimist Federation of the Americas.
- June 23, 1963. Golden Lulu Award, Los Angeles Advertising Women, at 60th annual convention, Advertising Association of the West, Los Angeles.
- September 17, 1963. Citation as "Outstanding Woman of the Year" for 1963 in journalism, by Board of Editors, "Who's Who of American Woman" – one of thirteen cited as outstanding among 20,500 distinguished women listed in the book.
- December 8, 1963. "Woman of the Year" Humanitarian Award, B'nai B'rith, Hollywood Lodge, 11-11.
- March 18, 1964. Knightly Cross of St. Brigitte, Knightly Order of St. Brigitte, for "...outstanding service in the cause of Christian, patriotic, cultural and charitable endeavors".
- November 6, 1966. Printer's Devil Award, Theta Sigma Phi, Los Angeles Chapter, for outstanding achievement in journalism –the first time the award was presented to a woman.
- March 20, 1967. Citation, U.S. Social Security Administration, for "...journalistic excellence" and community service.
- October 26, 1967. Named honorary citizen of Montebello and officially presented key to city by Mayor Anthony Lambo, at first annual Montebello Art Festival. (First U.S. citizen so designated—honor theretofore confined to foreign dignitaries.)

Source: Agness Underwood Collection, California State University, Northridge

== Legacy ==
The Agness Underwood Reporting Award is offered by the Department of Journalism at California State University, Northridge (CSUN). Underwood's archives are held in Special Collections and Archives at CSUN's University Library.
