= Georgette Bauerdorf =

Heiress, murder victim

- Born: Georgette Elise Bauerdorf; May 6, 1924; New York City, New York, U.S.
- Died: October 12, 1944 (aged 20); West Hollywood, California, U.S.
- Cause of death: Strangulation
- Education: St. Agatha's School for Girls; Marlborough School; Westlake School for Girls

Georgette Elise Bauerdorf (May 6, 1924 – October 12, 1944) was an American socialite and oil heiress who was strangled in her home in West Hollywood, California. Her murder remains unsolved.

== Early years ==
Born in New York City, Georgette Bauerdorf was the younger of two daughters born to oilman George Frederick Bauerdorf and his wife, Constance Dannhauser. She had an older sister, Constance (known as Connie). Georgette initially attended St. Agatha's School for Girls in New York City; after the family moved to Los Angeles in 1935, she attended the Marlborough School and Westlake School for Girls. The death of Georgette's mother had preceded the move.

Georgette aspired to be an actress and moved to West Hollywood in August 1944. She took an apartment at the El Palacio Apartments at 8493 Fountain Avenue and got a job working as a junior hostess at the Hollywood Canteen, where she danced with enlisted men.

The day before her death, Georgette cashed a $175 check and purchased an airline ticket to El Paso, Texas, for $90. She told friends that she was going there to rendezvous with her boyfriend, a soldier. On October 11, Pvt. Jerome M. Brown, an anti-aircraft artillery trainee stationed at Camp Callan, was identified by Fort Bliss authorities as the man Georgette had planned to visit. Brown told Army officials they had met at the Hollywood Canteen on the night of June 13. He left for El Paso several days after their meeting, but the couple continued to correspond by letter.

== Murder ==
On the night of October 11, 1944, Georgette left work at the Hollywood Canteen at around 11:15 p.m. She spent the next several hours dancing at a local club called the Palladium, leaving at around 2 a.m. Driving home, Georgette picked up a hitchhiking Army sergeant named Gordon Aadland, who had also gone to the Palladium; she told Aadland also that she was hurrying home to receive a telephone call from her boyfriend in Texas. This was possibly the last time she was seen alive.

On October 12, custodial staff came to Georgette's apartment and found her body floating face down in an overflowing bathtub. It is believed that Georgette was attacked by a man who was waiting inside the apartment for her. Inspector William Penprase of the Los Angeles County Sheriff's Department stated that an automatic night light over the outside entrance of the apartment had been unscrewed so that it would go dark; the murderer was thought to have stood on a chair to reach the light bulb nearly eight feet off the ground. Fingerprints were found on the bulb.

The theory of an intruder was reinforced by an empty string bean can and some melon rinds in a wastebasket in Georgette's kitchen. Investigators thought she may have eaten a snack before retiring upstairs to her bedroom. Examination of her stomach revealed that she had eaten string beans about an hour before her death. Her jewelry and other valuables were not stolen, although almost $100 was taken from her purse. There was a large roll of $2 bills and thousands of dollars' worth of sterling silver lying in an open trunk.

A 1936 Oldsmobile coupe, registered in the name of Georgette's sister, was missing from the scene. When the car was located, there was a dent in one of the fenders. Mechanics said the damage was recent and may have been the result of a collision with another car. The Oldsmobile was discovered abandoned on East 25th Street, just off San Pedro Street, where it had apparently run out of gas.

Georgette had put up a great struggle against her attacker. An examination by Los Angeles County autopsy surgeon Frank R. Webb found abundant bruises and scrapes, and determined that she had been raped. The knuckles on Georgette's right hand were smashed and bruised. There was a large bruise on the right side of her head and another on her abdomen, perhaps the result of blows from fists. She had been strangled with a piece of bandage material stuffed down her throat. Webb said her right thigh showed the bruised imprint of a hand "even to the fingernail marks piercing the skin".

== Investigation ==
A reconstruction of the murder gave investigators the idea that the culprit perhaps entered Georgette's apartment by passkey and lay in wait downstairs until she got ready for bed. Another possibility was that he rang the doorbell after she retired. Penprase believed it unlikely that Georgette was accompanied home by a serviceman. She might have met someone at the canteen who drove her home and left her at the door, then later returned to kill her after she prepared for bed.

The walls and doors of Georgette's apartment building were soundproofed; still, a neighbor, who requested anonymity, told Capt. Gordon Bowers of the Sheriff's Department that he was awakened by screams around 2:30 a.m. He first heard a scream which made him sit upright in bed, followed by a female voice yelling, "Stop, stop, you're killing me!" He said the screaming soon subsided. Thinking it might have been a family argument, he went back to bed.

A date book was found in Georgette's bedroom containing the names of servicemen. Army authorities joined with the Sheriff's Department in a search for clues. A sailor was questioned in Long Beach, but was determined not to have been her attacker. Authorities hoped that someone who saw the young woman leaving the canteen, accompanied by an escort, would come forward. Numerous letters received by the victim were scrutinized by investigators.

One particular soldier, described as "swarthy", was thought to have been infatuated with Georgette and had cut in on her during nearly every dance on the night of her death. Investigators checked U.S.O. centers and other canteens to try to find and question him. The soldier, identified in news accounts as Cpl. Cosmo Volpe, turned himself in several days after the discovery of Georgette's body, after he read the police were looking for a "husky, dark-haired GI". He was questioned by police, but eliminated as a suspect after he offered proof that he had "checked into his barracks at the Lockheed Air Terminal at 11 p.m."

June Ziegler, who had worked with Georgette at the Hollywood Canteen on the night prior to the murder, told the Sheriff's Department that Georgette had dated a 6'4" serviceman less than a month before her murder. He was a friend of another serviceman whose name was frequently mentioned in the diary. According to Ziegler, Georgette remarked that the tall soldier was very much taken with her. However, she did not return his interest and quit going out with him. The soldier was sought for questioning by officers.

Gordon Aadland, the sergeant whom she had given a ride a few hours before her death, recounted in 2012 that was riding a train on his way back to his base when he read about the murder in the newspaper. Aadland wrote a letter to the Los Angeles Police Department recounting his encounter with Georgette; he was later questioned by an officer from the provost martial's office, who took his testimony, but never heard anything else.

Rose Gilbert, a secretary to Georgette's father, reported that she occasionally asked men to stop by her apartment briefly, but never asked them to remain and never entertained friends alone as her Catholic education gave her very stringent ideas of propriety.

At a coroner's inquest October 20, a jury of nine men found that Georgette's death was a homicide and proposed a thorough investigation to apprehend her killer. During the hearing, Fred Atwood, a janitor of the apartment building, testified that he had heard woman's heels clicking back and forth on the floor, and was awakened by a loud crash at around midnight on October 11. He recognized the sounds as coming from Georgette's apartment. He said there was no one with her.

Atwood also said he entered the apartment the next morning about 11:10 a.m., accompanied by his wife. They found Bauerdorf's body lying semi-nude in her bathtub. Two of the deputies confirmed the janitor's testimony that Bauerdorf was alone before her slayer evidently lured her to her darkened door. Atwood said he discovered the night light bulb being screwed around a couple of turns. He responded that he had never seen this happen before. Officers testified that the apartment showed no indication of a struggle. Yet the autopsy proved that Bauerdorf had fought hard to live. Sam Wolf, brother of Bauerdorf's stepmother, denied that the victim suffered fainting spells.

== Legacy ==
Bauerdorf's body was shipped to New York via train after it was released by the coroner's office on October 15. Her funeral was held in New York City. She was buried in a Long Island cemetery plot the Bauerdorf family had maintained for generations. William Randolph Hearst, a close friend of Georgette's father, pressured the LAPD at his behest to close the investigation as quickly as possible; their reasons for this are unclear, but it was done supposedly to avoid embarrassment and to keep Georgette's romantic life private and her reputation intact, as she was sexually active and she documented all of her social and romantic relationships in her diary, which would become evidence and thus become available to the public had the investigation and a trial followed.

The high-profile murder of Elizabeth Short occurred in Los Angeles a few years after Bauerdorf's death. Authors and investigators have suggested a possible link between the two cases, partly because both women had similar appearances. Dr. George Hodel was a top suspect for the Short murder, and his son Steve Hodel has suggested George killed both women due to certain similarities such as the fact that Bauerdorf was choked with a medical-grade bandage shoved down her throat and that in both cases the media received notes supposedly from the killer taunting the police and boasting of his skills. However, though Hodel is considered the strongest suspect for the Black Dahlia murder, the critics say links between that case and that of Bauerdorf remains highly speculative.

== See also ==
- List of unsolved murders (1900–1979)
