= Nellie Madison =

American murderer (1895–1953)

Nellie May Madison
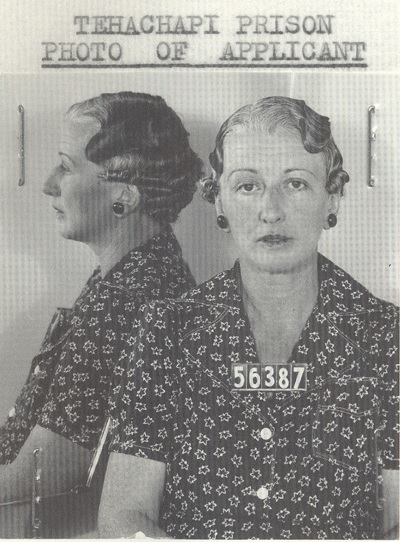
- Parole application photo of Madison (1941)
- Born: April 5, 1895; Beaverhead County, Montana, U.S.
- Died: July 8, 1953 (aged 58); San Bernardino, California, U.S.
- Motive: Spousal abuse
- Criminal penalty: Death; commuted to life imprisonment; further commuted to time served

Details
- Victims: Erik Madison, 41
- Date: March 24, 1934
- Location: Burbank, California
- Weapons: Handgun

Nellie May Madison (née Mooney; April 5, 1895 – July 8, 1953) was an American woman who was convicted of murder in 1934 for killing her husband.

Madison was only the second woman to be sentenced to death in the state of California, with the last being Emma LeDoux in 1906. Due to public outcry, her sentence was later commuted to life in prison and she was eventually released. Her case helped garner legitimacy for the abuse defense, a concept virtually unknown at the time in criminal cases.

The case was the subject of a 2015 episode of Investigation Discovery's series A Crime to Remember.

== Early life ==
She was born in Beaverhead County, Montana and raised in Dillon. She was trained to be a natural survivalist of the mountains. Prior to her marriage to Erik Madison, she had an annulment from a 23-year-old ex-convict when she was 13. She also later married and divorced three different men. She had no children.

== Murder and conviction ==
On March 24, 1934, at their home in Burbank, California, after alleged repeated spousal abuse episodes by her husband Erik Madison, Nellie Madison pointed a gun at Erik while he was changing out of his day clothes with the intent of threatening him. He quickly reached under the bed for a box of butcher knives and allegedly threatened to cut her heart out. As he was reaching for a knife, Nellie shot Erik in the back five times, killing him.

Nellie Madison was later arrested and tried for the murder of her husband. The prosecutor in her case was Los Angeles County District Attorney Buron Fitts. On advice of her lawyers, Madison made no mention of the spousal abuse and claimed she was not at the scene of the murder. As her story was implausible, a jury convicted her of first degree murder. The jury declined to recommend mercy and Judge Charles Fricke sentenced Madison to death by hanging. On appeal, the California Supreme Court upheld the conviction.

== Appeal ==
After sentencing, one Madison's ex-husbands, with whom she was still friends, urged her to make the spousal abuse episodes public. When pleading her case to Fricke, he refused to reduce the sentence and dismissed the allegations of domestic violence as "ridiculous." But soon Madison began receiving public support, including from prominent journalist Agness "Aggie" Underwood. Underwood discovered Erik Madison had beaten both Nellie and his ex-wife into signing a similar confession stating they were unfaithful in their marriage, when in fact, it was Erik who had been unfaithful and having affairs with teenage girls.

All of the jurors who convicted Madison petitioned Governor Frank Merriam to commute the sentence. In September 1935, Merriam commuted Madison's sentence to life in prison. After she waged a letter-writing campaign from prison to reduce her sentence, Governor Culbert Olson had Madison freed from prison on March 27, 1943, exactly nine years and three days after the murder.

== Later life ==
In the fall of 1943, she settled in San Bernardino, where she married her sixth husband, house painter John Wagner. It was her longest marriage. She died there on July 8, 1953, after a stroke.

== Sources ==
- Rasmussen, Cecillia (February 4, 2007). "Unwitting pioneer of the battered-woman defense". Los Angeles Times.
