= Mary Holland Kinkaid =

American novelist

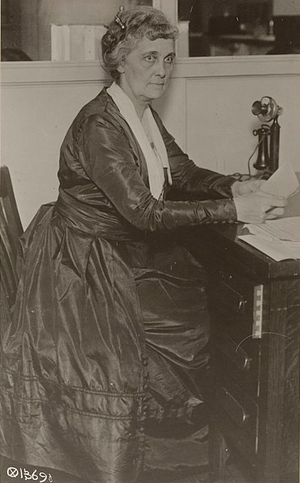
- Mary Holland Kinkaid, as photographed in 1918 by the War Department; National Archives and Records Administration.
- Born: Mary Holland McNeish; December 31, 1861; Wilkes-Barre, Pennsylvania
- Died: October 20, 1948 (aged 86); Laguna Beach, California
- Occupations: Writer, Suffragist
- Spouse: John Kinkaid (m. 1891)

Mary Holland Kinkaid (née McNeish; December 31, 1861 — October 20, 1948) was an American novelist and journalist.

== Early life ==
Mary Holland McNeish was born and raised in Wilkes-Barre, Pennsylvania, the daughter of John McNeish and Nettie Simpson McNeish.

== Career ==
Kinkaid worked in newspapers and magazines for about fifty years, in various capacities. She was a cartoonist at the Chicago Daily News, associate editor at The Delineator (alongside editor Theodore Dreiser), assistant city editor of the Denver Times and city editor of the Los Angeles Herald, among many other positions. She was also a syndicated columnist. During World War I, she was editor at the Women's Division of Public Information under Clara Sears Taylor, publishing from Washington on war matters.

Kinkaid was an active suffragist, and (from 1897 to 1898) Deputy State Superintendent of Public Instruction in Colorado. She was a president of the Southern California Woman's Press Club, and a founding member and officer of the Colorado Women's Democratic Club. She was director of "women's publicity" for the National Democratic Committee in 1920.

Books by Kinkaid include Walda (1903), The Man of Yesterday: A Romance of a Vanishing Race (1908), and her autobiography, The Golden Grain.

== Personal life ==
In 1891, Mary Holland McNeish married John Kinkaid, a state senator in Colorado. They had a son, John Holland Kinkaid, born 1894, and adopted a daughter. She died at home in Laguna Beach, California in 1948, aged 86 years.
