= Burns Mantle =

American theater critic (1873–1948)

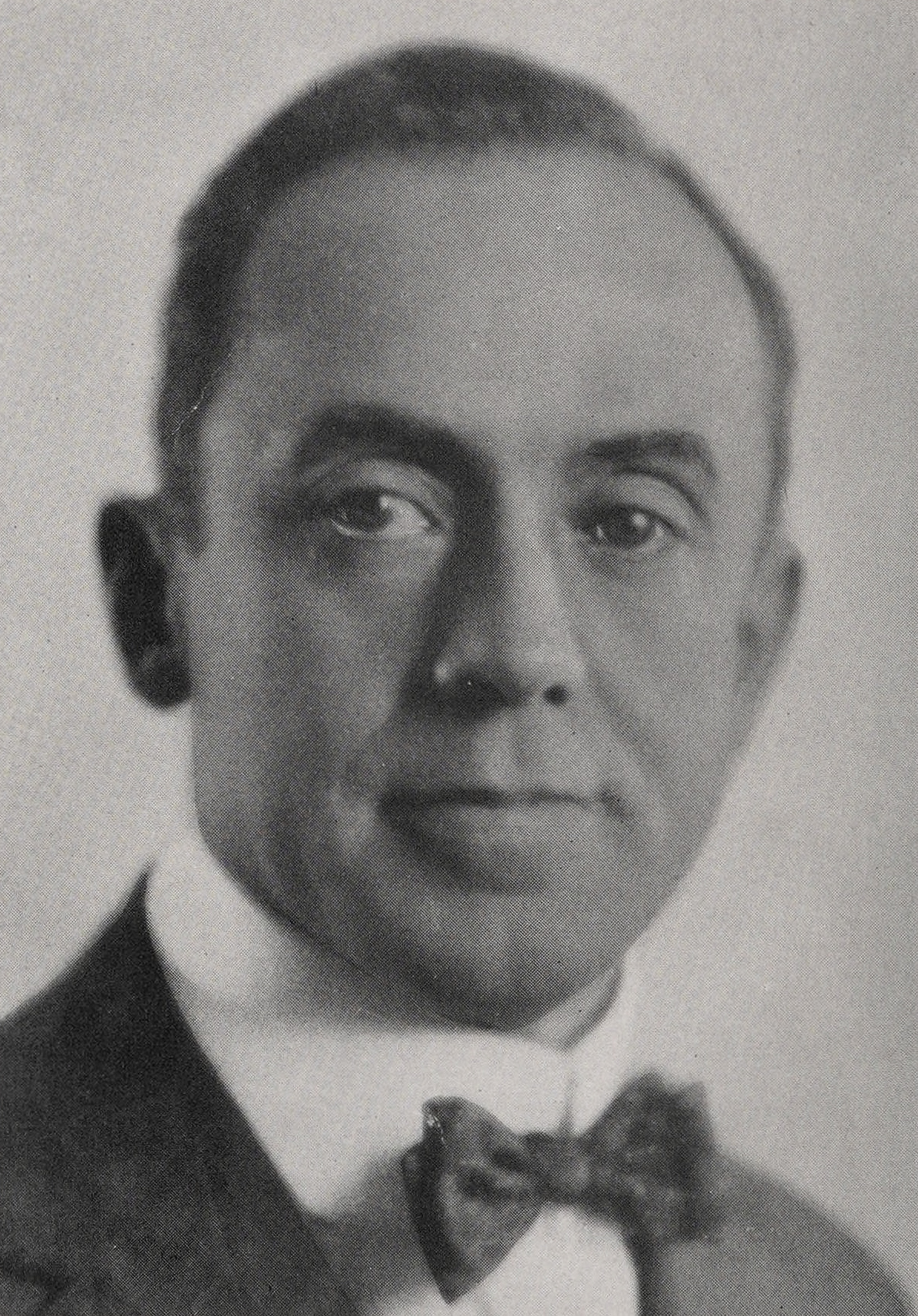
- Born: Robert Burns Mantle; December 23, 1873; Watertown, New York, United States
- Died: February 9, 1948 (aged 74); Forest Hills, Queens, New York, United States
- Occupations: Newspaper theatre critic, screenwriter
- Writing career
- Language: English
- Genre: Theatre criticism

Robert Burns Mantle (December 23, 1873 – February 9, 1948) was an American theater critic and screenwriter. He founded the Best Plays annual publication in 1920.

== Biography ==
Mantle was born in Watertown, New York, on December 23, 1873, to Robert Burns Mantle and Susan Lawrence. As a child he moved to Denver, Colorado.

By 1892, he was working as a linotype machine operator in California and then became a reporter.

By the late 1890s, Mantle was working as a drama critic for the Denver Times. He later moved to Chicago, Illinois, and then New York City, New York, in 1911. He was at the New York Evening Mail until 1922, and then the Daily News until his retirement in 1943. Mantle was succeeded as the drama critic at the Daily News by his assistant John Arthur Chapman.

He died, aged 74, of stomach cancer on February 9, 1948.

His wife was the former Lydia (Lillie) Sears; her sister Clara Sears Taylor was a journalist and government official who assisted Mantle with compiling his Best Plays publications.
