= Black Dahlia =

American murder victim (1924–1947)

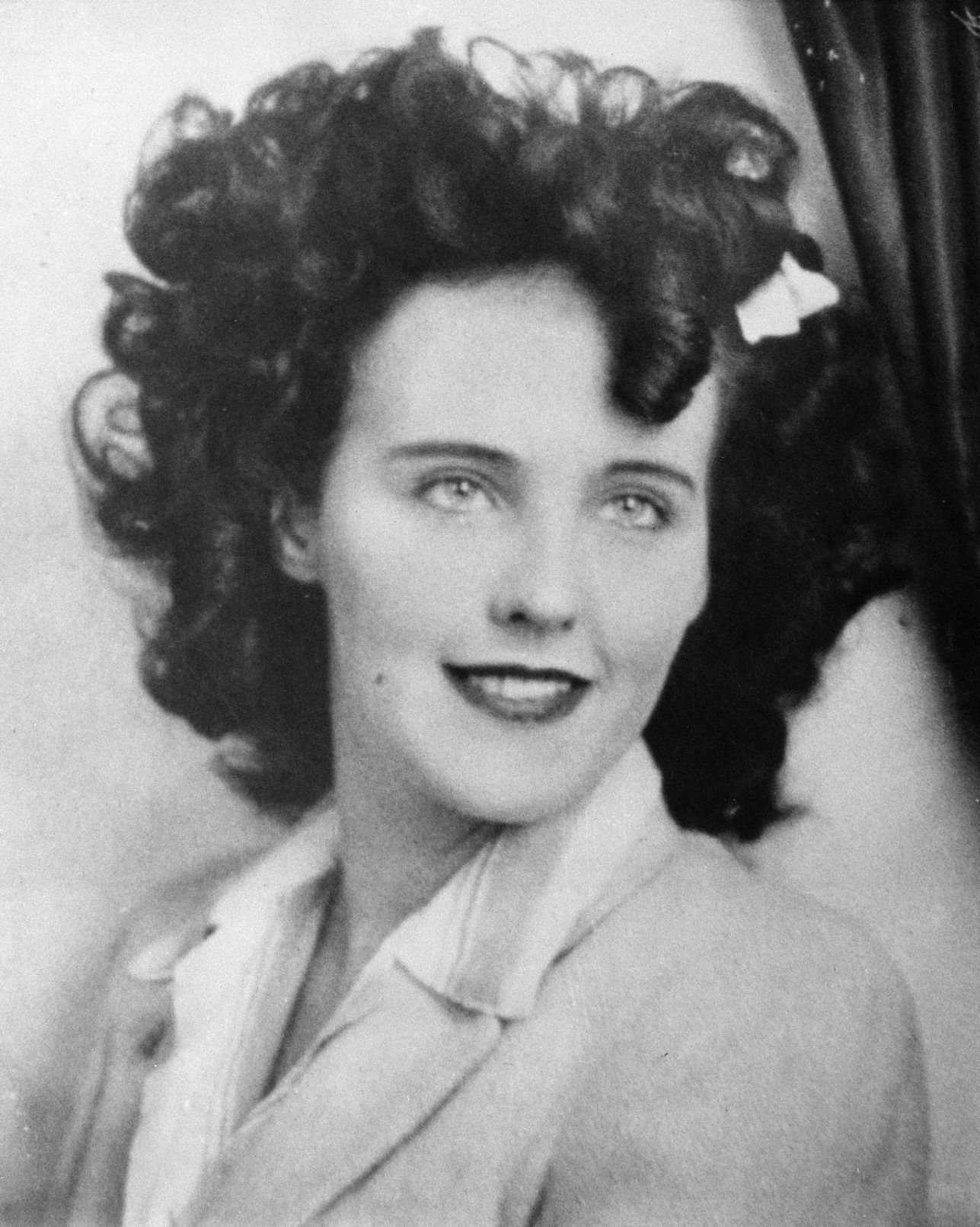
- Short in 1946
- Born: Elizabeth Short; July 29, 1924; Boston, Massachusetts, U.S.
- Disappeared: January 9, 1947
- Died: c. January 14–15, 1947 (aged 22); Los Angeles, California, U.S.
- Cause of death: Homicide (cerebral hemorrhage)
- Resting place: Mountain View Cemetery, Oakland, California, U.S. 37°50′07″N 122°14′13″W
- Occupation: Waitress
- Known for: Murder victim

Elizabeth Short (July 29, 1924 – c. January 14–15, 1947), posthumously known as the Black Dahlia, was an American woman found murdered in the Leimert Park neighborhood of Los Angeles, California, on January 15, 1947. Her case became highly publicized owing to the gruesome nature of the crime, which included the mutilation and bisection of her corpse.

A native of Boston, Short spent her early life in New England and Florida before relocating to California, where her father lived. It is commonly held that she was an aspiring actress, though she had no known acting credits or jobs during her time in Los Angeles. Short acquired the nickname of the "Black Dahlia" posthumously, as newspapers of the period often nicknamed particularly lurid crimes; the term may have originated from the film noir thriller The Blue Dahlia (1946). After the discovery of her body, the Los Angeles Police Department (LAPD) began an extensive investigation that produced over 150 suspects but yielded no arrests.

Short's unsolved murder and the details surrounding it have had a lasting cultural impact, generating various theories and public speculation. Her life and death have been the basis of numerous books and films, and her murder is frequently cited as one of the most famous unsolved murders in U.S. history, as well as one of the oldest unsolved cases in Los Angeles County. It has likewise been credited by historians as one of the first major crimes in postwar America to capture national attention. (Note: Crime historian Dirk Gibson cited Short's murder as one of the first highly publicized murders to grip the nation's attention after World War II, while in her work American Murder, Gini Graham Scott likens the case to the highly publicized O. J. Simpson murder trial in the mid-1990s.)

== Life ==
=== Childhood ===
Elizabeth Short (Note: Various sources list Short's official birth name simply as "Elizabeth Short", including copies of her registered birth certificate, showing that no middle name was given at birth.) was born on July 29, 1924, in the Hyde Park neighborhood of Boston, Massachusetts, the third of five daughters to Cleo Alvin Short Jr. (October 18, 1885 – January 19, 1967) and his wife, Phoebe May Sawyer (July 2, 1897 – March 1, 1992). Her sisters were Virginia May West (1920–1985), Dorothea Schloesser (1922–2012), Elnora Chalmers (1925–2022) and Muriel Short (1929–2023). Short's father was a United States Navy sailor from Gloucester Courthouse, Virginia, while her mother was a native of Milbridge, Maine. The Shorts were married in Portland, Maine, in 1918. The Short family briefly relocated to Portland in 1927, before settling in Medford, Massachusetts, a suburb of Boston, that same year.

Short's father built miniature golf courses until he lost most of his savings in the 1929 stock market crash. In 1930, his car was found abandoned on the Charlestown Bridge, and it was assumed that he had jumped into the Charles River. Believing her husband to be deceased, Short's mother began working as a bookkeeper to support the family.

Troubled by bronchitis and severe asthma attacks, Short underwent lung surgery at age 15, after which doctors suggested she periodically relocate to a milder climate to prevent further respiratory problems. Her mother sent her to spend winters with family friends in Miami, Florida, for the next three years. Short dropped out of Medford High School during her sophomore year.

=== Relocation to California ===
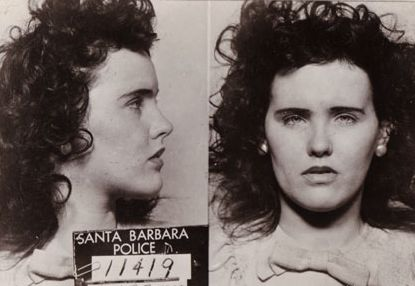
Short's arrest photo from 1943 for underage drinking

In late 1942, Short's mother received a letter of apology from her presumed-deceased husband, which revealed that he was in fact alive and had started a new life in California. In December of that year, at age 18, Short relocated to Vallejo, California, to live with her father, whom she had not seen since age 6. At the time her father was working at the nearby Mare Island Naval Shipyard on San Francisco Bay. Arguments between Short and her father led to her moving out in January 1943.

Short took a job at the Base Exchange at Camp Cooke (now Vandenberg Space Force Base) near Lompoc, California, briefly living with a United States Army Air Force sergeant who reportedly abused her. She left Lompoc in mid-1943 and moved to Santa Barbara, where she was arrested on September 23 for drinking at a local bar while underage. Juvenile authorities sent her back to Massachusetts, (Note: The reduction of the legal age of majority, when a person is no longer a juvenile, from the longstanding standard of 21 to 18 did not occur in the United States until the 1970s, although the drinking age remained at 21.) but she returned instead to Florida, making only occasional visits to her family near Boston.

While in Florida, Short met Major Matthew Michael Gordon Jr., a decorated Army Air Force officer of the 2nd Air Commando Group, who was training for deployment to Southeast Asian theater of World War II. Short later told friends that Gordon had written to propose marriage while he was recovering from injuries from a plane crash in India. She accepted his offer, but Gordon died in a second crash on August 10, 1945. Short's sister Dorothea also served in the war and was assigned to decode Japanese messages.

In July 1946, Short relocated to Los Angeles to visit Army Air Force Lieutenant Joseph Gordon Fickling, an acquaintance from Florida, who was stationed at the Naval Reserve Air Base in Long Beach. Short spent the last six months of her life in Southern California, mostly in the Los Angeles area; shortly before her death she had been working as a waitress and rented a room behind the Florentine Gardens nightclub on Hollywood Boulevard. Short has been variously described and depicted as an aspiring or "would-be" actress. According to some sources, she did in fact have aspirations to be a film star, though she had no known acting jobs or credits. (Note: Short is often referred to or characterized as an aspiring actress, though she had no known acting jobs or credits to her name.)

== Murder ==
=== Prior activities ===
On January 9, 1947, Short returned to her home in Los Angeles after a brief trip to San Diego with Robert "Red" Manley, a 25-year-old married salesman she had been dating. Manley stated that he dropped Short off at the Biltmore Hotel in downtown Los Angeles, and that Short was to meet one of her sisters, who was visiting from Boston, that afternoon. By some accounts, staff of the Biltmore recalled having seen Short using the lobby telephone. (Note: Gini Graham Scott states in American Crime that Short was sighted at the Biltmore on January 9, though a Los Angeles Times article published in 1997 calls into question the validity of this, noting that mention of the Biltmore sighting "cannot be found in heated news accounts of the day, which reported on every conceivable contact anyone had with Short in the so-called 'missing week' before her death.") Shortly after, she was allegedly seen by patrons of the Crown Grill Cocktail Lounge at 754 South Olive Street, approximately 3/8 mile (600 m) away from the Biltmore.

=== Discovery ===
On the morning of January 15, 1947, Short's naked body, severed into two pieces, was found in a vacant lot on the west side of South Norton Avenue, midway between Coliseum Street and West 39th Street (at 34.0164°N 118.333°W) in the neighborhood of Leimert Park, which was largely undeveloped at the time.

Short's severely mutilated body was completely severed at the waist and drained of blood, leaving her skin a pallid white. Medical examiners determined that she had been dead for around ten hours prior to the discovery, leaving her time of death either sometime during the evening of January 14 or the early morning hours of January 15. The body apparently had been washed by the killer. Short's face had been slashed from the corners of her mouth to her ears, creating an effect known as the "Glasgow smile". She had several cuts on her thigh and breasts, where entire portions of flesh had been sliced away. The lower half of her body was positioned a foot away from the upper, and her intestines had been tucked neatly beneath her buttocks. The corpse had been "posed", with her hands over her head, her elbows bent at right angles, and her legs spread apart.

Los Angeles Herald-Express reporter Aggie Underwood was among the first to arrive at the crime scene, and took several photos of Short's body and its surroundings. Near the body, detectives located a heel print on the ground amid the tire tracks, and a cement sack containing watery blood was also found nearby.

=== Autopsy and identification ===
An autopsy of Short's body was performed on January 16, 1947, by Frederick Newbarr, the Los Angeles County coroner. Newbarr's autopsy report stated that Short was 5 feet 5 inches (1.65 m) tall, weighed 115 pounds (52 kg) and had light blue eyes, brown hair and badly decayed teeth. (Note: Short's autopsy notes her bottom teeth were in a significant state of decay. In Severed, John Gilmore writes that Short allegedly plugged her cavities with wax, and this supposed fact was reprinted (albeit with pointed skepticism) in a 1997 Los Angeles Times article.) There were ligature marks on her ankles, wrists and neck, and an "irregular laceration with superficial tissue loss" on her right breast. Newbarr also noted superficial lacerations on the right forearm, left upper arm and the lower left side of the chest.

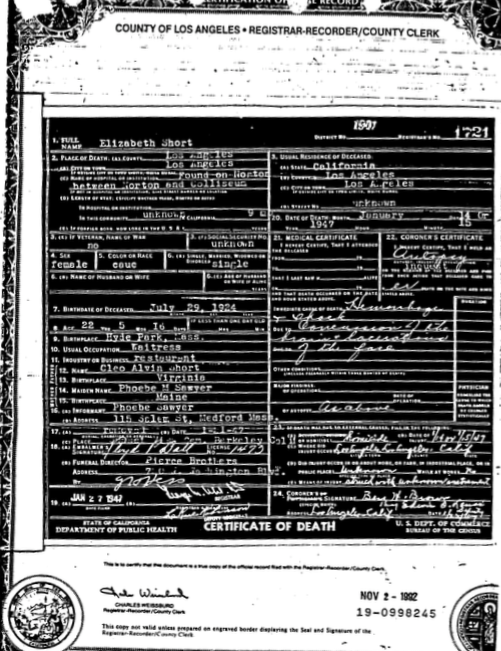
Short's death certificate

Short's body had been cut completely in half by a technique taught in the 1930s called a hemicorporectomy. The lower half of her body had been removed by transecting the lumbar spine between the second and third lumbar vertebrae, thus severing the intestine at the duodenum. Newbarr's report noted "very little" ecchymosis (bruising) along the incision line, suggesting it had been performed after death. Another "gaping laceration" measuring 4 1/4 inches (110 mm) long ran longitudinally from the umbilicus to the suprapubic region. The lacerations on each side of the face, which extended from the corners of the lips, were measured at three inches (75 mm) on the right side of the face, and 2 1/2 inches (65 mm) on the left. The skull was not fractured, but there was bruising noted on the front and right side of her scalp, with a small amount of bleeding in the subarachnoid space on the right side, consistent with blows to the head. The cause of death was determined to be hemorrhaging from the lacerations to her face and the shock from blows to the head and face. Newbarr noted that Short's anal canal was dilated at 1 3/4 inches (45 mm), suggesting that she might have been raped. Samples were taken from her body testing for the presence of sperm, but the results came back negative.

Short was identified after her fingerprints were sent to the Federal Bureau of Investigation (FBI); her fingerprints were on file from her 1943 arrest. Immediately following the identification, a team of reporters from William Randolph Hearst's Los Angeles Examiner contacted her mother, Phoebe Short, in Boston over the phone. Wain Sutton spoke with Short's mother while City Editor Jimmy Richardson and Jim Murray sat next to him. Sutton intentionally deceived Phoebe and told her that her daughter had won a beauty contest. It was only after prying as much personal information as they could from Phoebe that the reporters revealed that her daughter had in fact been murdered.

Jim Murray would recount the infamous phone call to journalist Larry Harnisch in an interview decades later:

"Wain called the mother and asked all these questions and took all these notes," Murray recalled. "I sat there and listened to the poor, dear mother telling him about her school-day triumphs. I can still see him put his hand over the mouthpiece of the old-fashioned upright phone and say, 'Now, what do I tell her?'

Richardson screwed up his one good eye and said, 'Now tell her'

"'You son of a bitch,'" Murray said, imitating Sutton.

Murray told Harnisch in the same interview that he was "still appalled" and that the "incident was sharply etched in his memory." Phoebe Short initially could not believe what the reporters had told her. She refused to believe that her daughter had been murdered until eventually she received confirmation from the Los Angeles Police through her local police department.

The Examiner also offered to pay Phoebe's airfare and accommodations if she would travel to Los Angeles to help with the police investigation; that was yet another ploy since the newspaper kept her away from police and other reporters to protect its scoop. The Examiner and another Hearst newspaper, the Herald-Express, later sensationalized the case, with one Examiner article describing the black tailored suit Short was last seen wearing as "a tight skirt and a sheer blouse." The media nicknamed her the "Black Dahlia", and described her as an "adventuress" who "prowled Hollywood Boulevard." Additional newspaper reports, such as one published in the Los Angeles Times on January 17, deemed the murder a "sex fiend slaying."

== Investigation ==
=== Initial investigation ===
==== Letters and interviews ====
On January 21, a person claiming to be Short's killer placed a phone call to the office of James Richardson, the editor of the Examiner, congratulating Richardson on the newspaper's coverage of the case and stating he planned on eventually turning himself in, but not before allowing police to pursue him further. Additionally, the caller told Richardson to "expect some souvenirs of Beth Short in the mail".

Three days later, a suspicious manila envelope was discovered, addressed to "The Los Angeles Examiner and other Los Angeles papers", with individual words that had been cut-and-pasted from newspaper clippings; additionally, a large message on the face of the envelope read: "Here is Dahlia's belongings[,] letter to follow." The envelope contained Short's birth certificate, business cards, photographs, names written on pieces of paper and an address book with the name Mark Hansen embossed on the cover. The packet had been carefully cleaned with gasoline, similarly to Short's body, which led police to suspect the packet had been sent directly by her killer. Despite efforts to clean the packet, several partial fingerprints were lifted from the envelope and sent to the FBI for testing; however, the prints were compromised in transit and thus could not be properly analyzed. The same day the packet was received by the Examiner, a handbag and a black suede shoe were reported to have been seen on top of a garbage can in an alley a short distance from Norton Avenue, two miles (three kilometers) from the crime scene. The items were recovered by police but had also been wiped clean with gasoline, destroying any fingerprints.

On March 14, an apparent suicide note scrawled in pencil on a bit of paper was found tucked in a shoe in a pile of men's clothing by the ocean's edge at the foot of Breeze Avenue in Venice. The note read: "To whom it may concern: I have waited for the police to capture me for the Black Dahlia killing, but have not. I am too much of a coward to turn myself in, so this is the best way out for me. I couldn't help myself for that, or this. Sorry, Mary." The pile of clothing was first seen by a beach caretaker, who reported the discovery to lifeguard captain John Dillon. Dillon immediately notified Captain L. E. Christensen of West Los Angeles police station. The clothes included a coat and trousers of blue herringbone tweed, a brown and white T-shirt, white jockey shorts, tan socks and tan moccasin leisure shoes, size about eight. The clothes gave no clue about the identity of their owner.

Police quickly deemed Mark Hansen, the owner of the address book found in the packet, a suspect. Hansen was a wealthy local nightclub and theater owner and an acquaintance at whose home Short had stayed with friends. According to some sources, (Note: Janice Knowlton claims that it was Robert Manley who identified the items as belonging to Short, while Cathy Scott states that it was Hansen.) Hansen also confirmed that the purse and shoe discovered in the alley were in fact Short's. Ann Toth, Short's friend and roommate, told investigators that Short had recently rejected sexual advances from Hansen, and suggested it as a potential motive for him to kill her; however, Hansen was cleared of suspicion in the case. In addition to Hansen, the Los Angeles Police Department (LAPD) interviewed over 150 men in the ensuing weeks who they believed to be potential suspects. Robert Manley, who had been one of the last people to see Short alive, was also investigated, but was cleared of suspicion after passing numerous polygraph examinations. Police also interviewed several persons found listed in Hansen's address book, including Martin Lewis, who had been an acquaintance of Short's. Lewis was able to provide an alibi for the date of Short's murder, as he was in Portland, Oregon, visiting his dying father-in-law.

A total of 750 investigators from the LAPD and other departments worked on the Short case during its initial stages, including 400 sheriff's deputies and 250 California State Patrol officers. Various locations were searched for potential evidence, including storm drains throughout Los Angeles, abandoned structures and various sites along the Los Angeles River, but the searches yielded no further evidence. Los Angeles City councilman Lloyd G. Davis posted a $10,000 (equivalent to $144,188 in 2025) reward for information leading police to Short's killer. After the announcement of the reward, various persons came forward with confessions, most of which police dismissed as false. Several of the false confessors were charged with obstruction of justice.

==== Media response; decline ====
On January 26, another letter was received by the Examiner, this time handwritten, which read: "Here it is. Turning in Wed., Jan. 29, 10 am. Had my fun at police. Black Dahlia Avenger." The letter also named a location at which the supposed killer would turn himself in. Police waited at the location on the morning of January 29, but the alleged killer did not appear. Instead, at 1:00pm, the Examiner offices received another cut-and-pasted letter which read: "Have changed my mind. You would not give me a square deal. Dahlia killing was justified."

The graphic nature of the murder and the subsequent letters received by the Examiner had resulted in a media circus surrounding Short's murder. Both local and national publications heavily covered the story, many of which reprinted sensationalistic reports suggesting that Short had been tortured for hours prior to her death; the information was false, yet police allowed the reports to circulate so as to conceal Short's true cause of death—cerebral hemorrhage—from the public. Further reports about Short's personal life were publicized, including details about her alleged declining of Hansen's sexual advances; additionally, a stripper who was an acquaintance of Short's told police that she "liked to get guys worked up over her, but she'd leave them hanging dry." This led some reporters (namely the Herald-Express's Bevo Means) and detectives to look into the possibility that Short was a lesbian, and begin questioning employees and patrons of gay bars in Los Angeles; this claim, however, remained unsubstantiated. The Herald-Express also received several letters from the purported killer, again made with cut-and-pasted clippings, one of which read: "I will give up on Dahlia killing if I get 10 years. Don't try to find me."

On February 1, the Los Angeles Daily News reported that the case had "run into a Stone Wall", with no new leads for investigators to pursue. The Examiner continued to run stories on the murder and the investigation, which was front-page news for thirty-five days following the discovery of the body.

When interviewed, lead investigator Captain Jack Donahue told the press that he believed Short's murder had taken place in a remote building or shack on the outskirts of Los Angeles, and that her body was transported to the location where it was disposed of. Based on the precise cuts and dissection of Short's body, the LAPD looked into the possibility that the murderer had been a surgeon, doctor or someone with medical knowledge. In mid-February 1947, the LAPD served a warrant to the University of Southern California Medical School, which was located near the site where the body had been discovered, requesting a complete list of the program's students. The university agreed so long as the students' identities remained private. Background checks were conducted but yielded no results.

=== Grand jury and aftermath ===
By the spring of 1947, Short's murder had become a cold case with few new leads. Sergeant Finis Brown, one of the lead detectives on the case, blamed the press for compromising the investigation through journalists' probing of details and unverified reporting. In September 1949, a grand jury convened to discuss inadequacies in the LAPD's homicide unit based on their failure to solve numerous murders—especially those of women and children—in the previous several years, Short's being one of them. In the aftermath of the grand jury, further investigation was done on Short's past, with detectives tracing her movements between Massachusetts, California and Florida, and also interviewing people who knew Short in Texas and New Orleans. However, the interviews yielded no useful information in the murder.

== Suspects and confessions ==
The notoriety of Short's murder has spurred a large number of confessions over the years, many of which have been deemed false. During the initial investigation, police received a total of sixty confessions, most made by men. Since that time, over 500 people have confessed to the crime, some of whom had not even been born at the time of her death. Sergeant John P. St. John, an LAPD detective who worked the case until his retirement, stated, "It is amazing how many people offer up a relative as the killer."

In 2003, Ralph Asdel, one of the original detectives on the case, told the Times that he believed he had interviewed Short's killer, a man who had been seen with his sedan parked near the crime scene in the early morning hours of January 15, 1947. A neighbor driving by that day stopped to dispose of a bag of lawn clippings in the lot when he saw a parked sedan, allegedly with its right rear door open; the driver of the sedan was standing in the lot. The neighbor's arrival apparently startled the owner of the sedan, who approached the neighbor's car and peered in the window before returning to the sedan and driving away. The owner of the sedan was followed to a local restaurant where he worked, but was ultimately cleared of suspicion.

Suspects remaining under discussion by various authors and experts include a doctor named Walter Bayley, proposed by former Times copy editor Larry Harnisch; Times publisher Norman Chandler, whom biographer Donald Wolfe claims impregnated Short; Leslie Dillon; Joseph A. Dumais; Artie Lane; Mark Hansen; Francis E. Sweeney; folk singer Woody Guthrie, who was briefly a suspect but cleared; mobster Bugsy Siegel and filmmaker Orson Welles, neither of whom were ever suspects in the murder; George Hodel; Hodel's friend Fred Sexton; George Knowlton; Robert M. "Red" Manley; Patrick S. O'Reilly; and Jack Anderson Wilson.

Although he was never formally charged in the crime, George Hodel came to wider attention after his death when he was accused by his son, LAPD homicide detective Steve Hodel, of killing Short and committing several additional murders. Prior to the Dahlia case, George Hodel was suspected, but not charged, in the death of his secretary, Ruth Spaulding, and was accused of raping his daughter Tamar, but acquitted. Hodel fled the country several times and lived in the Philippines between 1950 and 1990. Additionally, Steve Hodel has cited his father's training as a surgeon as circumstantial evidence. In 2003, it was revealed in notes from the 1949 grand jury report that investigators had wiretapped George Hodel's home and obtained recorded conversation of him with an unidentified visitor, saying: "Supposin' I did kill the Black Dahlia. They couldn't prove it now. They can't talk to my secretary because she's dead. They thought there was something fishy. Anyway, now they may have figured it out. Killed her. Maybe I did kill my secretary."

In 1991, Janice Knowlton, who was aged 10 at the time of Short's murder, claimed that she witnessed her father, George Knowlton, beat Short to death with a claw hammer in the detached garage of her family's home in Westminster. She also published a book titled Daddy was the Black Dahlia Killer in 1995, in which she made additional claims that her father sexually abused her. The book was condemned as "trash" by Knowlton's stepsister, Jolane Emerson, who stated: "She believed it, but it wasn't reality. I know, because I lived with her father for sixteen years." Additionally, St. John told the Times that Knowlton's claims were "not consistent with the facts of the case."

The 2017 book Black Dahlia, Red Rose by Piu Eatwell focuses on Leslie Dillon, a bellhop who was a former mortician's assistant; his associates Mark Hansen and Jeff Connors; and Sergeant Finis Brown, a lead detective who had links to Hansen and was allegedly corrupt. Eatwell posits that Short was murdered because she knew too much about the men's involvement in a scheme for robbing hotels. She further suggests that Short was killed at the Aster Motel in Los Angeles, where the owners reported finding one of their rooms "covered in blood and fecal matter" on the morning Short's body was found. The Examiner stated in 1949 that LAPD chief William A. Worton denied that the Aster Motel had anything to do with the case, although its rival newspaper, the Los Angeles Herald-Express, claimed that the murder took place there.

In 2000, Buz Williams, a retired detective with the Long Beach Police Department, wrote an article for the LBPD newsletter The Rap Sheet on Short's murder. His father, Richard F. Williams, was a member of the LAPD's Gangster Squad investigating the case. Williams' father reportedly believed that Dillon was the killer, and that when Dillon returned to his home state of Oklahoma he was able to avoid extradition to California because his ex-wife Georgia Stevenson was second cousins with Illinois Governor Adlai Stevenson II, who contacted the governor of Oklahoma on Dillon's behalf. Williams' article claimed that Dillon sued the LAPD for $3 million, but that the suit was dropped. Harnisch disputes this, stating that Dillon was cleared by police after an exhaustive investigation and that the district attorney's files positively placed him in San Francisco when Short was killed. Harnisch claims that there was no LAPD coverup, and that Dillon did in fact receive a financial settlement from the City of Los Angeles, but has not produced concrete evidence to prove this.

== Theories and potentially related crimes ==
=== Cleveland Torso Murders ===
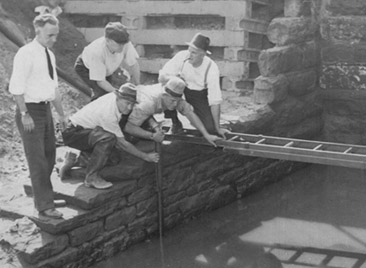
Police search for remains in the Cleveland Torso Murders, 1936; some journalists and law enforcement have speculated a connection between the Cleveland crimes and Short's murder. (Note: The Cleveland Torso Murders, which occurred between 1934 and 1938 in Cleveland, Ohio, were investigated by Eliot Ness. Some biographers, such as Oscar Fraley, claim Ness knew the identity of the Cleveland killer, who was also responsible for Short's killing in Los Angeles.)

Several crime authors, as well as police detective Peter Merylo, have suspected a link between the Short murder and the Cleveland Torso Murders, which took place in Cleveland, Ohio, between 1934 and 1938. As part of their investigation into other murders that took place before and after the Short killing, the original LAPD investigators studied the Torso Murders in 1947 but later discounted any connection between the two cases. In 1980, new evidence implicating a former Torso Murder suspect, Jack Anderson Wilson, was investigated by St. John in relation to Short's murder. He claimed he was close to arresting Wilson in Short's murder, but that Wilson died in a fire on February 4, 1982. The possible connection to the Torso Murders received renewed media attention when it was profiled on the NBC series Unsolved Mysteries in 1992, in which Eliot Ness biographer Oscar Fraley suggested Ness knew the identity of the killer responsible for both cases.

=== Lipstick Murders ===
Crime authors such as Steve Hodel and William Rasmussen have suggested a link between the Short murder and the 1946 murder and dismemberment of 6-year-old Suzanne Degnan in Chicago, Illinois. Captain Donahoe of the LAPD stated publicly that he believed the Black Dahlia and the "Lipstick Murders" in Chicago were "likely connected." Among the evidence cited is the fact that Short's body was found on Norton Avenue, three blocks west of Degnan Boulevard, Degnan being the last name of the girl from Chicago. There were also striking similarities between the handwriting on the Degnan ransom note and that of the "Black Dahlia Avenger." Both texts used a combination of capitals and small letters (the Degnan note read in part "BuRN This FoR heR SAfTY" [sic]), and both notes contain a similar misshapen letter P and have one word that matches exactly. Convicted serial killer William Heirens served life in prison for Degnan's murder. Initially arrested at age 17 for breaking into a residence close to that of Degnan, Heirens claimed he was tortured by police, forced to confess and made a scapegoat for the murder. After being taken from the medical infirmary at the Dixon Correctional Center on February 26, 2012, for health problems, Heirens died at the University of Illinois Medical Center on March 5, 2012, at age 83.

=== Lone Woman Murders ===
Between 1943 and 1949, over a dozen unsolved murders occurred in Los Angeles which involved the sexual mutilation of young attractive women. Authorities suspected at the time that they could have been the work of a single unidentified serial killer. In 1949, a Los Angeles County grand jury was tasked with investigating the failure on the part of law enforcement to solve the cases. As a result, further investigation was done on the homicides although none of them were solved.

- On July 27, 1943, the son of a greenskeeper discovered the nude body of 41-year-old Ora Elizabeth Murray lying on the ground near the parking lot of the Fox Hills Golf Course. Murray had been severely beaten about her face and body, and the autopsy determined that her cause of death was due to "constriction of the larynx by strangulation". Murray was last seen on July 26, 1943, attending a dance at the Zenda Ballroom in downtown Los Angeles with her sister before leaving with an unidentified man. Her murder remains unsolved.
- John Gilmore's 1994 book Severed: The True Story of the Black Dahlia Murder, suggests a possible connection between Short's murder and that of 20-year-old Georgette Bauerdorf. At 11 a.m. on October 12, 1944, Bauerdorf's maid and a janitor arrived to clean her apartment in West Hollywood where they found her body face down in her bathtub. It is believed that Bauerdorf was attacked by a man who was waiting inside the apartment for her. Gilmore suggests that Short's employment at the Hollywood Canteen, where Bauerdorf also worked as a hostess, could be a potential connection between the two women. However, the claim that Short ever worked at the Hollywood Canteen has been disputed by other sources, such as the retired Times copy-editor Larry Harnisch. Regardless, Steve Hodel has still suggested that both women were killed by the same individual since in both cases the media received notes supposedly from the killer taunting the police and boasting of his skills.
- The murder of 44-year-old Jeanne "Nettie" French on February 10, 1947, was also considered by the media and detectives as possibly being related to Short's killing. French's body was discovered in West Los Angeles on Grand View Boulevard, nude and badly beaten. Written on her stomach in lipstick was what appeared to say "Fuck You B.D." and the letters "TEX" below. The Herald-Express covered the story heavily and drew comparisons to the Short murder less than a month prior, surmising the initials "B.D." stood for "Black Dahlia". According to historian Jon Lewis, however, the scrawling actually read "P.D.", ostensibly standing for "police department."
- On March 12, 1947, the nude body of 43-year-old Evelyn Winters was found at 12:10 a.m. in a vacant lot of an abandoned rail yard in Norwalk, California, along the Los Angeles River. Winters had been bludgeoned and strangled to death. She was last seen by a male acquaintance, James Joseph Tiernan, who stated to authorities that he saw her leave the Albany Hotel in Los Angeles at 8:00 p.m.
- Dorothy Ella Montgomery, aged 36, was found at about 10:30 a.m. in a vacant field on May 4, 1947, under a pepper tree in Florence-Graham, California. Montgomery had died due to strangulation and was found nude and beaten. She had been missing since 9:30 p.m. the previous evening when she had left her home to pick up her daughter at a dance recital.
- On May 12, 1947, the body of 39-year-old Laura Eliza Trelstad was discovered by an oil company patrolman in an oil field on Long Beach Boulevard. Trelstad had been sexually assaulted, strangled with a belt and then thrown from a moving vehicle. According to her husband, they had both been playing cards the night prior at their home in 2211 Locust Avenue, Long Beach, with friends in the late afternoon. Trelstad's husband wanted to continue; but she had become bored and left to go to the Crystal Ballroom. She stated: "If the boys can play poker, we girls can go dance." She was not seen alive again.
- On July 8, 1947, the naked body of Rosenda Josephine Mondragon, aged 21, was discovered by a postal clerk in a gutter near Los Angeles City Hall. Mondragon had been strangled by a silk stocking. She was last seen by her estranged husband that morning, at 1 a.m., when he had been served by her with divorce papers at his residence. She then left entering a stranger's car.
- On the evening of October 2, 1947, Lillian Dominguez, aged 15, was walking home with her sister and a friend in Santa Monica, when a man approached them and proceeded to stab Dominguez in the heart with a stiletto blade, between her second and third ribs. One week later, on October 9, a note on the back of a business card was left under the door of a furniture store. The message was written in pencil and read: "I killed the Santa Monica Girl, I will kill others."
- On February 14, 1948, 42-year-old Gladys Eugenia Kern, a Los Angeles real estate agent, was found stabbed in the back with a hunting knife in a vacant house that she was showing in the Los Feliz district at 4217 Cromwell Avenue. That afternoon Kern was last seen with an unidentified man at the counter of a nearby drugstore. The murderer had stolen her appointment book and had cleaned the murder weapon before he left.
- Cosmetologist Louise Margaret Springer, aged 35, was found murdered on June 13, 1949, in the backseat of her husband's convertible sedan alongside a street in South Central Los Angeles. She had been garroted with a length of clothesline that had been knotted and a stick had been inserted into her anus. Springer's husband notified law enforcement of her disappearance that evening when he returned from an errand inside her shop to find both Springer and his vehicle missing.
- Mimi Boomhower, aged 48, was last heard from when she telephoned a friend from her home in the 700 block of Nimes Road in Los Angeles on August 18, 1949. Between 7:00 and 8:00 p.m., the call ended. Five days after she vanished, Boomhower's white handbag was discovered in a phonebooth at a grocery store in Los Angeles. Boomhower was never heard from again, and she was later declared legally dead.
- On the evening of October 7, 1949, 26-year-old Jean Spangler left her home in Los Angeles, telling her sister-in-law that she was going to meet with her ex-husband before going to work as an extra on a film set. She was last seen alive at a grocery store several blocks from her home at approximately 6:00 p.m. Two days later, Spangler's tattered purse was discovered in a remote area of Griffith Park, approximately 5.5 miles (8.9 km) from her home; inside was a letter addressed to a "Kirk," which mentioned seeing a doctor.

== Rumors and factual disputes ==
Numerous details regarding Short's personal life and death have been points of public dispute. (Note: Varying claims about Short's life leading up to her death—including such claims that she was a prostitute, among other things—have been alleged and refuted by different sources. A 2016 article in the New York Daily News highlights the "Black Dahlia" name and Short's whereabouts from January 9–15, 1947 as key points of contention and intrigue.) The eager involvement of both the public and press in solving her murder have been credited as factors that complicated the investigation significantly, resulting in a complex, sometimes inconsistent narrative of events. According to Anne Marie DiStefano of the Portland Tribune, many "unsubstantiated stories" have circulated about Short over the years: "She was a prostitute, she was frigid, she was pregnant, she was a lesbian. And somehow, instead of fading away over time, the legend of the Black Dahlia just keeps getting more convoluted." Harnisch has refuted several supposed rumors and popular conceptions about Short and also disputed the validity of Gilmore's book Severed, claiming the book is "25% mistakes, and 50% fiction." Harnisch had examined the district attorney's files (he claimed that Steve Hodel has examined some of them pertaining to his father, along with Times columnist Steve Lopez) and contrary to Eatwell's claims, the files showed that Dillon was thoroughly investigated and was determined to have been in San Francisco when Short was killed. Harnisch speculated that Eatwell either did not find these files or she chose to ignore them.

=== Murder and state of the body ===
A number of people, none of whom knew Short, contacted police and newspapers claiming to have seen her during her so-called "missing week," between her January 9 disappearance and the discovery of her body, on January 15. Police and district attorney's investigators ruled out each alleged sighting; in some cases, those interviewed were identifying other women whom they had mistaken for Short. Short's whereabouts in the days leading up to her murder and the discovery of her body are unknown.

After the discovery of Short's body, numerous Los Angeles newspapers printed headlines claiming she had been tortured leading up to her death. This was denied by law enforcement at the time, but they allowed the claims to circulate so as to keep Short's actual cause of death a secret from the public. Some sources, such as Oliver Cyriax's Crime: An Encyclopedia (1993), state that Short's body was covered in cigarette burns inflicted on her while she was still alive, though there is no indication of this in her official autopsy report.

In Severed, Gilmore states that the coroner who performed Short's autopsy suggested in conversation that she had been forced to consume feces based on his findings when examining the contents of her stomach. This claim has been denied by Harnisch and is also not indicated in Short's official autopsy, though it has been reprinted in several print and online media.

=== Nickname ===
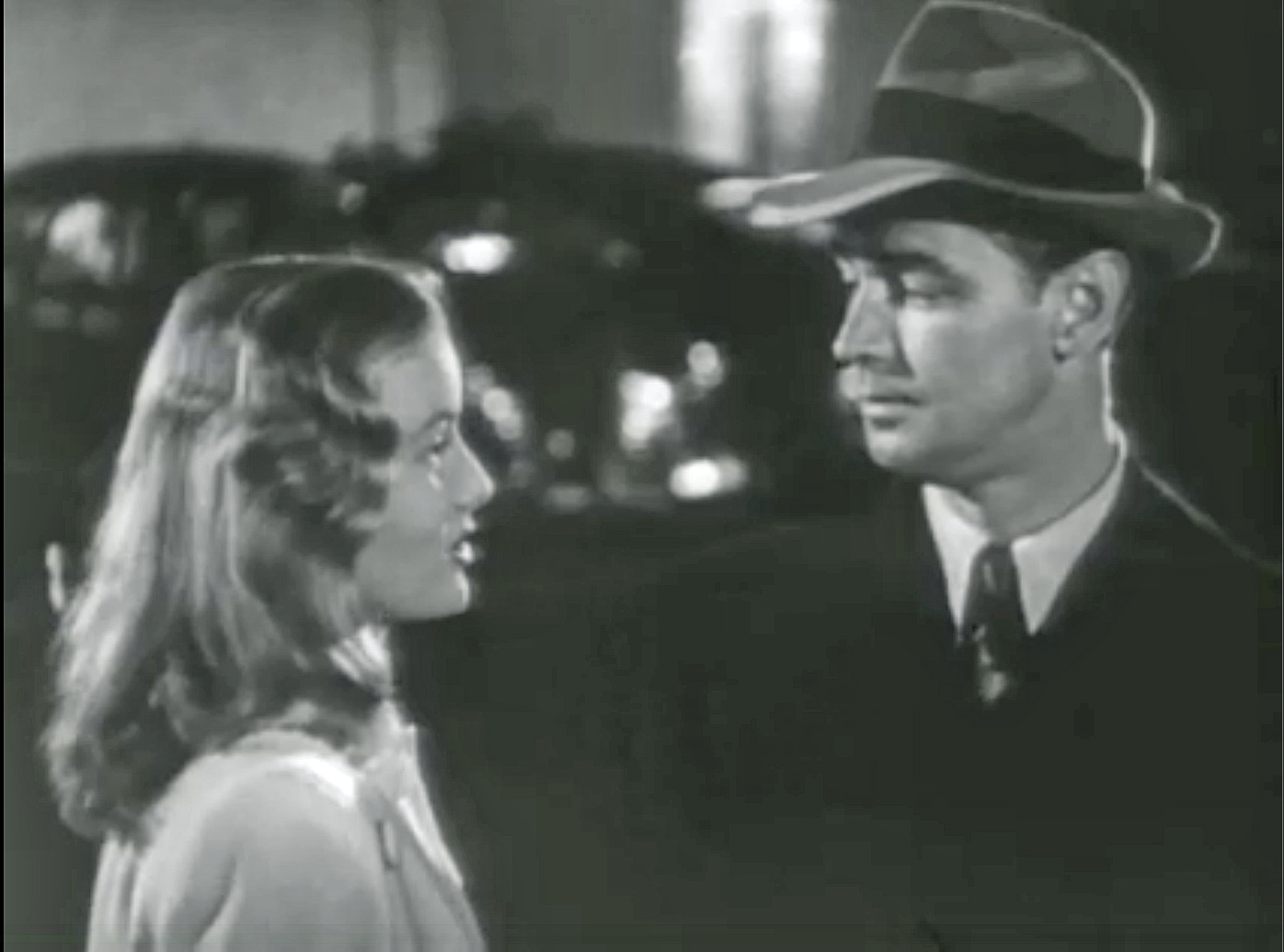
Some sources attribute the Black Dahlia name to the 1946 film noir The Blue Dahlia, starring Veronica Lake and Alan Ladd (pictured).

According to newspaper reports shortly after the murder, Short received the nickname "Black Dahlia" from staff and patrons at a Long Beach drugstore in mid-1946 as wordplay on the film The Blue Dahlia (1946). Other popularly-circulated rumors claim that the media crafted the name because Short adorned her hair with dahlias. According to the FBI's official website, Short received the first part of the nickname from the press "for her rumored penchant for sheer black clothes."

However, reports by district attorney's investigators state that the nickname was invented by newspaper reporters covering her murder; Herald-Express reporter Bevo Means, who interviewed Short's acquaintances at the drugstore, has been credited with first using the "Black Dahlia" name, though reporters Underwood and Jack Smith have been alternatively named as its creators. While some sources claim that Short was referred to or went by the name during her life, others dispute this. (Note: Harnisch claims that Short went by the "Black Dahlia" name in life, while other sources, such as a 2016 New York Daily News article, dispute this claim. Some sources, however, still claim that Short went by the name in her life.) Both Gilmore and Harnisch agree that the name originated during Short's lifetime and was not a creation of the press: Harnisch states that it was in fact a nickname she earned from the staff of the Long Beach drugstore she frequented; in Severed, Gilmore names an A.L. Landers as the proprietor of the drugstore, though he does not provide the store's name. Prior to the circulation of the "Black Dahlia" name, Short's killing had been dubbed the "Werewolf Murder" by the Herald-Express because of the brutal nature of the crime.

=== Alleged prostitution and sexual history ===
Many true crime books claim that Short lived in or visited Los Angeles at various times in the mid-1940s, including Gilmore's Severed, which claims she worked at the Hollywood Canteen. This is disputed by Harnisch, who states that Short did not, in fact, live in Los Angeles until after the canteen's closing in 1945. Although some of Short's acquaintances and several commentators described Short as a prostitute or call girl during her time in Los Angeles, (Note: In his 2001 book Torso: The Story of Eliot Ness and the Search for a Psychopathic Killer, Steve Nickel describes Short as a "common street prostitute, hooked on alcohol and drugs", posing nude for photos and living with a lesbian lover. Though these claims have persisted in crime biographies on Short, some journalists, such as the Los Angeles Times' Larry Harnisch, dispute their validity, as does Alexis Fitts in a 2016 article published in The Guardian, and Bob Calhoun of SF Weekly.) according to Harnisch, the contemporaneous grand jury proved that there was no existing evidence that she was ever a prostitute. Harnisch claims that the rumor regarding Short's history as a prostitute originates from John Gregory Dunne's 1977 novel True Confessions, which is based in part on the crime.

Another widely circulated rumor (sometimes used to counter claims that Short was a prostitute) holds that Short was unable to have sexual intercourse because of a congenital defect that resulted in gonadal dysgenesis, also known as "infantile genitalia." (Note: John Gilmore notes in Severed that Short's genitalia was apparently too undeveloped to allow for intercourse, as noted by the deputy coroner who performed her autopsy. This claim is disputed by Hélèna Katz in Cold Cases: Famous Unsolved Mysteries, Crimes, and Disappearances in America, and by Michael Newton in The Encyclopedia of Unsolved Crimes.) Los Angeles County district attorney's files state that the investigators had questioned three men with whom Short had engaged in sex, including a Chicago police officer who was a suspect in the case; FBI files on the case also contain a statement from one of Short's alleged lovers. Short's autopsy itself, which was reprinted in full in Michael Newton's 2009 book The Encyclopedia of Unsolved Crimes, notes that her uterus was "small"; however, no other information in the autopsy is provided that would suggest her reproductive organs were anything other than anatomically normal. The autopsy also states that Short was not and had never been pregnant, contrary to what had been claimed prior to and following her death.

Another rumor—that Short was a lesbian—has often circulated; according to Gilmore, this rumor began after Means was told by the deputy coroner that Short "wasn't having sex with men" owing to her allegedly "small" genitalia. Means took this to mean that Short had sex with women, and both he and Herald-Express reporter Sid Hughes began fruitlessly investigating gay bars in Los Angeles for further information.

== Legacy ==
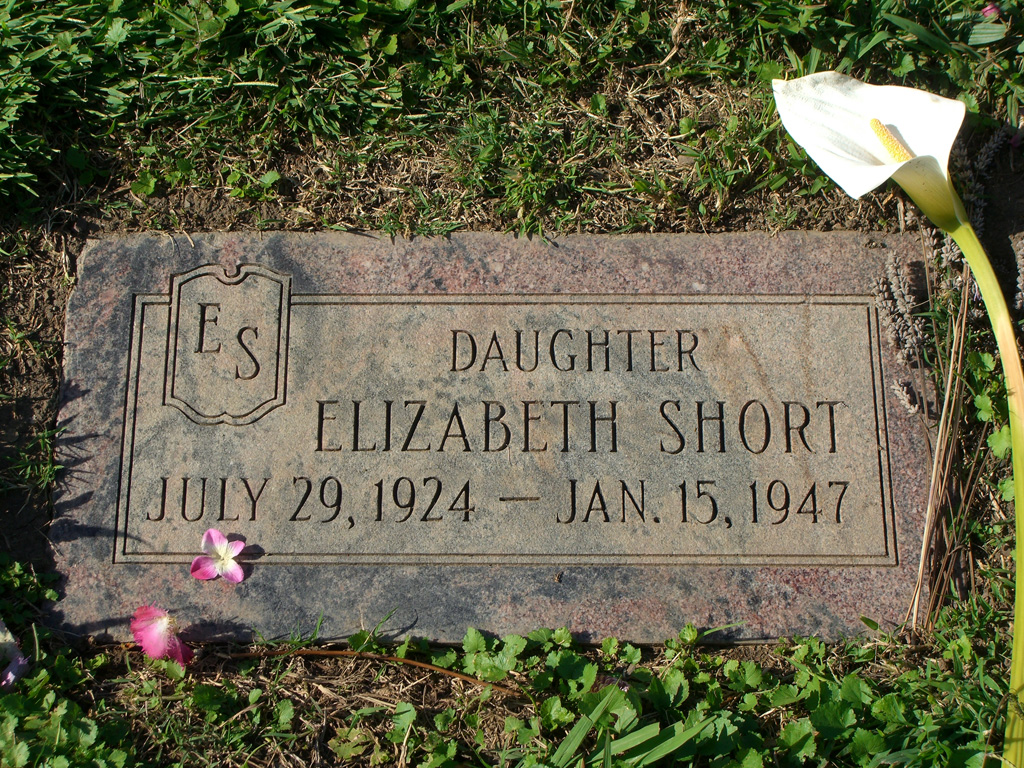
Short's grave in Oakland, California

Short is interred at the Mountain View Cemetery in Oakland. After her younger sister, Elnora, had grown up and married, their mother Phoebe moved to Oakland to be near her daughter's grave. She finally returned to the East Coast in the 1970s, where she lived into her nineties and died in 1992. On February 2, 1947, just two weeks after Short's murder, Republican state assemblyman C. Don Field was prompted by the case to introduce a bill calling for the formation of a sex offender registry; the state of California would become the first U.S. state to make the registration of sex offenders mandatory.

Short's murder has been described as one of the most brutal and culturally enduring crimes in U.S. history, and Time magazine listed it as one of the most infamous unsolved cases in the world.

Short's life and death have been the basis of numerous books, television shows, films, and video games, both fictionalized and non-fiction. Among the most famous fictional accounts of Short's death is James Ellroy's 1987 novel The Black Dahlia, which, in addition to the murder, explored "the larger fields of politics, crime, corruption, and paranoia in post-war Los Angeles," according to cultural critic David M. Fine. Ellroy's novel was adapted into a 2006 film of the same name by director Brian De Palma: Short was played by actress Mia Kirshner. Both Ellroy's novel and its film adaptation bear little relation to the facts of the case. Michael Connelly's 2024 novel The Waiting has a major subplot involving the Black Dahlia case. Short's murder is also the basis of a major storyline in the acclaimed video game L.A. Noire.

Short was also portrayed in heavily fictionalized accounts by Lucie Arnaz in the 1975 television film Who Is the Black Dahlia?, by Jessica Nelson in Season Four, Episode 13 of Hunter, and by Mena Suvari in the series American Horror Story in 2011, featuring Short in the plot line of the episode "Spooky Little Girl", and again in 2018 with "Return to Murder House".

== See also ==
- Agness Underwood
- Crime in Los Angeles
- Ernest E. Debs
- List of unsolved murders (1900–1979)

== Sources ==
- Badal, James Jessen (2001). In the Wake of the Butcher: Cleveland's Torso Murders. Kent State University Press. ISBN 978-0-873-38689-0.
- Chancellor, Arthur S.; Graham, Grant D. (2016). Crime Scene Staging: Investigating Suspect Misdirection of the Crime Scene. Charles C. Thomas. ISBN 978-0-398-09139-2.
- Cyriax, Oliver (1993). Crime: An Encyclopedia. Andre Deutsch. ISBN 978-0-233-98821-4.
- Fine, David M. (2004). Imagining Los Angeles: A City in Fiction. University of Nevada Press. ISBN 0-87417-603-4.
- Gibson, Dirk Cameron (2004). Clues from Killers: Serial Murder and Crime Scene Messages. Greenwood. ISBN 978-0-275-98360-4.
- Gilmore, John (2006) [1994]. Severed: The True Story of the Black Dahlia Murder (Second ed.). Los Angeles: Amok Books. ISBN 978-1-878-92310-3.
- Hare, William (2004). L.A. Noir: Nine Dark Visions of the City of Angels. McFarland. ISBN 978-0-786-41801-5.
- Haugen, Brenda (2010). The Black Dahlia: Shattered Dreams. Capstone Publishers. ISBN 978-0-7565-4358-7.
- Hodel, Steve (2003). Black Dahlia Avenger: A Genius for Murder. New York: Arcade Publishing. ISBN 1-55970-664-3.
- Hodel, Steve; Pezzullo, Ralph (2009). Most Evil: Avenger, Zodiac, and the Further Serial Murders of Dr. George Hill Hodel. Penguin. ISBN 978-1-101-14035-2.
- Katz, Hélèna (2010). Cold Cases: Famous Unsolved Mysteries, Crimes, and Disappearances in America. ABC-CLIO. ISBN 978-0-313-37692-4.
- Knowlton, Janice; Newton, Michael (1995). Daddy Was the Black Dahlia Killer. New York: Simon and Schuster. ISBN 0-671-88084-5.
- Lewis, Jon (2017). Hard-Boiled Hollywood: Crime and Punishment in Postwar Los Angeles. University of California Press. ISBN 978-0-520-28432-6.
- Mancall, Jim (2013). James Ellroy: A Companion to the Mystery Fiction. McFarland. ISBN 978-0-786-433070.
- Mayo, Mike (2008). American Murder: Criminals, Crimes, and the Media. Visible Ink Press. ISBN 978-1-57859-256-2.
- Nelson, Mark; Bayliss, Sarah Hudson (2006). Exquisite Corpse: Surrealism and the Black Dahlia Murder. New York: Bulfinch Press. ISBN 0-8212-5819-2.
- Newton, Michael (2009). The Encyclopedia of Unsolved Crimes. Infobase Publishing. ISBN 978-1-438-11914-4.
- Nickel, Steve (2001). Torso: The Story of Eliot Ness and the Search for a Psychopathic Killer. John F. Blair. ISBN 978-0-895-87246-3.
- Rasmussen, William T. (2005). Corroborating Evidence: The Black Dahlia Murder. Santa Fe, NM: Sunstone Press. ISBN 0-86534-536-8.
- Reppetto, Thomas A. (2013). American Police, A History: 1945–2012: The Blue Parade. Vol. II. Enigma Books. ISBN 978-1-936274-44-4.
- Scott, Gini Graham (2007). American Murder: Homicide in the Early 20th Century. Greenwood. ISBN 978-0-275-99977-3.
- Scott, Cathy (2017). The Crime Book. DK. Penguin. ISBN 978-1-465-46667-9.
- U.S. Federal Bureau of Investigation (2008). The FBI: A Centennial History, 1908–2008. Government Printing Office. ISBN 978-0-160-80954-5.
- Wilkes, Roger (2006). Giant Book of Unsolved Crimes (Revised ed.). Magpie Books. ISBN 978-1-845-29205-8.
