= Severed: The True Story of the Black Dahlia Murder =

1994 book by John Gilmore

- First edition cover
- Author: John Gilmore
- Language: English
- Subject: Historical
- Genre: Non-fiction; true crime
- Published: December 1994
- Publisher: Zanja Press (first edition); Amok Books
- Publication place: United States
- Media type: Print
- Pages: 288 pages
- ISBN: 978-0-938-33103-2

Severed: The True Story of the Black Dahlia Murder is a 1994 American historical true crime book by John Gilmore. The book details the life and death of Elizabeth Short, also known as "The Black Dahlia," an infamous murder victim whose mutilated body was found in Leimert Park, Los Angeles in 1947, and whose murder has remained unsolved for decades.

According to Gilmore, he was inspired to write the book after having met Elizabeth Short when he was eleven years old. Published in 1994, it was the first and one of the most extensive non-fiction accounts of Elizabeth Short's murder.

== Background and content ==
The 1947 murder of a service worker named Elizabeth Short, known after her death as the "Black Dahlia," has over the decades become integrated into popular culture regarding crime due to widespread media coverage, with its unsolved nature being a contributing factor.

The book offers a documented solution to the case as endorsed by law enforcement and forensic science experts. Through the narrative, Gilmore, whose father was an LAPD officer at the time of the murder, unravels the multilayered mystery of Short's slaying.

Gilmore tells several previously unrevealed stories at once, each filled with its own bizarre elements through which the book transcends the true crime genre. One is the tale of victim Elizabeth Short, small-town beauty queen with big hopes, who seemed to float through her tragically futile life as an alluring yet doom-laden enigma. Another is the tangled inside story of the police investigation and the remorseless, William Randolph Hearst stoked press hoopla that paralleled it. Finally Gilmore reveals the twisted psychology and down-and-out life story of the actual murderer— as well as the startling circumstances and gruesome details of the killer's indirect confessions to him. The book contains a thirty-two-page photo section with many never before-published photos from the life of Elizabeth Short and from the case, including graphic crime scene and postmortem police photos.

Critics have questioned the accuracy of Gilmore's book, describing it as "25% mistakes, and 50% fiction".

== Reception ==
The book was well-received upon publication, receiving praise from publisher Larry Flynt, as well as David Lynch, who optioned the book for film rights in 1995; the film eventually fell through.

== See also ==
- Elizabeth Short
- List of unsolved deaths
- Crime in Los Angeles
