= Piu Eatwell =

British-Indian author

Piu Marie Eatwell (born 6 November 1970) is a British-Indian author based in Paris, France. She is best known for her true-crime book, Black Dahlia, Red Rose. It was referred to in The New York Times as one of the best true-crime stories. She is also the author of They Eat Horses, Don't They? The Truth About The French, which won the 2014 Next Generation Indie Award for multicultural nonfiction.

== Career ==
She wrote and published her first book in 2013, They Eat Horses, Don't They? The Truth About The French. It was received positively, and was reviewed by The Guardian, The New York Times, Daily Mail, and The Spectator. She then wrote two more books, The Dead Duke, His Secret Wife, and the Missing Corpse, and F is for France: A Curious Cabinet of French Wonders in 2014 and 2016 respectively before her publishing her nonfiction book, Black Dahlia, Red Rose in 2017, covering the case of the Black Dahlia.

== Publications ==
- They Eat Horses, Don't They? The Truth About The French (2013) – ISBN 1250053056
- The Dead Duke, His Secret Wife, and the Missing Corpse (2014) – ISBN 1781856087
- F is for France: A Curious Cabinet of French Wonders (2016) – ISBN 1250087732
- Black Dahlia, Red Rose (2017) – ISBN 1631492268
