= Eatwell Guide =

Visual nutrition guidance

The Eatwell Guide is a pictorial summary of the main food groups and their recommended proportions for a healthy diet. It is the method for illustrating dietary advice by the Public Health England, issued officially by the Government of the United Kingdom.

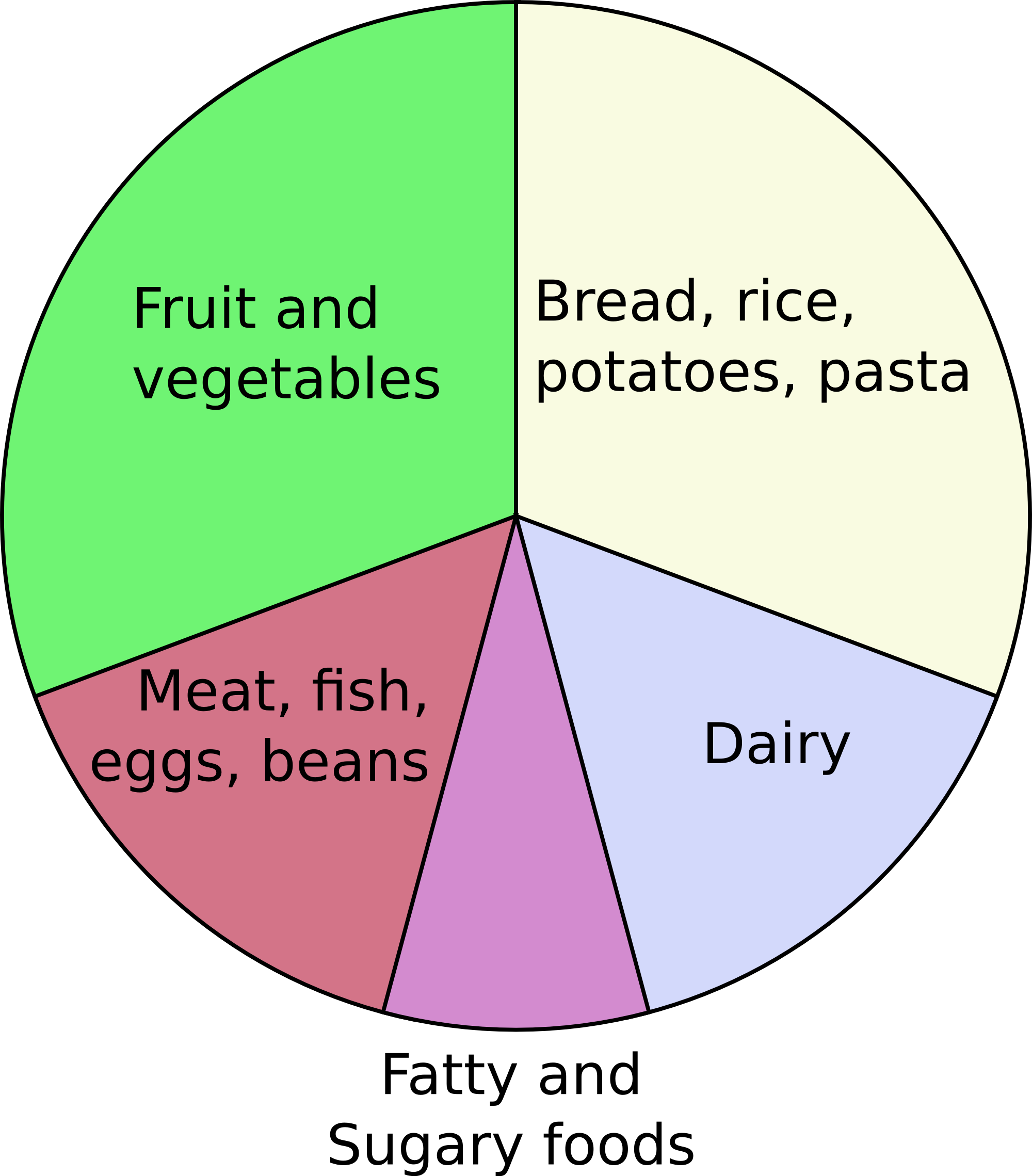
A simplified chart of the original Eatwell Plate

The Eatwell Guide was previously known as the Eatwell Plate and as The Balance of Good Health. The Eatwell Plate was superseded by the Eatwell Guide published on 17 March 2016.

== Recommendations ==
The types of food are split into five categories:

- Plenty of fruit and vegetables (at least six or seven portions a day). 2–3
- Plenty of potatoes, bread, rice, pasta and other starchy foods. 2–3
- Some milk and dairy and/or calcium fortified soy milk. 2–3
- Some meat, fish, eggs and/or non-dairy sources of protein (like beans and pulses). 2–3
- Only a small amount of high fat/sugar foods. 1–2

There is also advice on limiting the salt intake, and drinking at least 6–8 glasses of water, or unsweetened beverages, per day, while avoiding soda pops and soft drinks high in sugar.

== See also ==
- Dietary Reference Values
- List of nutrition guides
