= Gini Graham Scott =

American songwriter

Gini Scott
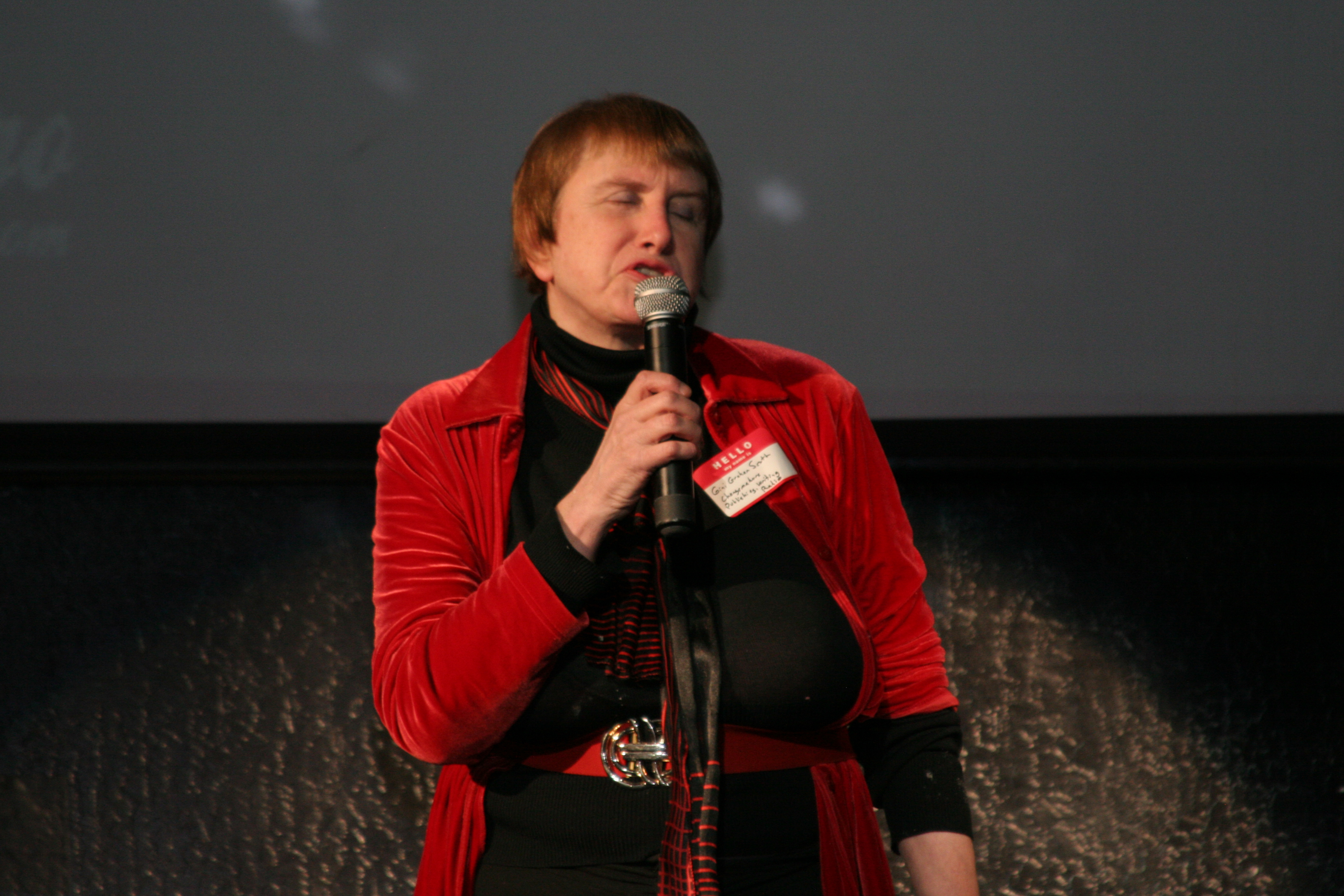
- Scott in 2011
- Born: 12 June 1942 (age 84)
- Education: University of California, Berkeley (PhD)

Gini Graham Scott (born 12 June 1942) is an American author, songwriter, and game developer. She is also a consultant specializing in business and work relationships, conflict resolution, creativity, social issues, and criminal justice.

Scott received a PhD in Sociology from the University of California, Berkeley in 1976, a JD from the University of San Francisco School of Law in 1990, AA degrees from Merritt College in Anthropology, Social Sciences and Police Sciences in May 2001, and M.A.s in Anthropology and Mass Communications at California State University, East Bay.

She has published over 40 books on diverse subjects. She has received national media exposure for her books (including appearances on Good Morning America, Oprah, Montel Williams, CNN, and the O'Reilly Factor). She is founder and director of Changemakers Publishing, Screenworks, Songworks, and Creative Communications & Research. She hosted a weekly radio talk show series, Changemakers, featuring interviews on various topics, which aired from 1991 to 1993 to 1 million listeners in over 70 countries. She has taught classes at several colleges, including Woodbury University, Notre Dame de Namur University, and the Investigative Career Program in San Francisco.

== Songwriting ==
Scott is a songwriter member of BMI and a member of several songwriter organizations, including the Country Music Association, Nashville Songwriting Association, and West Coast Songwriters Association. She has written over 100 songs in various genres, including country, gospel, pop, folk, and novelty songs. At least 50 have been published, and a dozen have been recorded on independent labels. She has written several songs with dog themes associated with her Do You Look Like Your Dog book, web site, and TV game/reality show.

== Game and toy design ==
Scott has developed over two dozen games with major game companies, including Hasbro, Pressman, and Mag-Nif. She licensed Glasnost: The Game of Soviet-American Peace and Diplomacy to John N. Hansen (1988), which received a 1989 International Clio for packaging. She was a spokesperson for Nintendo's Tetris II game in 1994, and licensed two games to Briarpatch for introduction at the American Toy Fair show in October 2006.

== Bibliography ==
- American Murder (Praeger Pub Text October 2007) ISBN 0-275-98388-9, ISBN 978-0-275-98388-8
- Brain Boosters : Foods & Drugs That Make You Smarter with Beverly A. Potter & Sebastian Orfali (Ronin Pub July 1993) ISBN 0-914171-65-8, ISBN 978-0-914171-65-2
- Building a Winning Sales Team : How to Recruit, Train and Motivate the Best (Probus, McGraw-Hill August 1991) ISBN 1-55738-209-3, ISBN 9781557382092
- Can We Talk?: The Power and Influence of Talk Shows (Plenum 1996)
- Collect Your Court Judgement (Nolo 1999)
- Collection Techniques for Small Business (Oasis Press 1994, with John J. Harrison)
- A Complete Idiot's Guide to Party Plan Selling (Alpha Books 2005)
- The Complete Idiot's Guide to Shamanism (Alpha Books, 2002)
- The Creative Traveler: A Guidebook for All Places and All Seasons (Tudor 1989, iUniverse January 2000) ISBN 0-595-00494-6, ISBN 978-0-595-00494-2
- Debt Collection (Oasis Press 1987)
- Disagreements, Disputes, and All-Out War : 3 Simple Steps for Dealing With Any Kind of Conflict (Amacom Books October 2007) ISBN 0-8144-8063-2, ISBN 978-0-8144-8063-2
- Do You Look Like Your Dog? (Broadway Books/Random House 2004)
- Effective Selling and Sales Management (Brick House Pub Co. February 1988) ISBN 0-931790-76-X, ISBN 978-0-931790-76-8
- The Empowered Mind: How to Harness the Creative Force Within You (Prentice Hall 1993, IUniverse 2006)
- Erotic Power : An Exploration of Dominance and Submission (Kensington Pub Corp April 1997) ISBN 0-8065-1851-0, ISBN 978-0-8065-1851-0
- The Fantasy Seekers: Exploring Fantasy in Everyday Life (toExcel January 2000) ISBN 0-595-00496-2, ISBN 978-0-595-00496-6
- Get Rich Through Multi-Level Selling (Self-Counsel Press 1989)
- Homicide by the Rich and Famous (Greenwood 2004, Berkley Books 2006)
- In the Land of Difficult People : 21 Timeless Tales Reveal How to Tame Beasts at Work (Amacom Books April 2008) ISBN 0-8144-0029-9, ISBN 978-0-8144-0029-6
- Lying in Everyday Life (Harbinger House April 1991) ISBN 0-943173-71-X, ISBN 978-0-943173-71-9
- The Magicians : A Study of the Use of Power in a Black Magic Group (Irvington Pub. April 1983) ISBN 0-8290-0707-5, ISBN 978-0-8290-0707-7
- Making Ethical Choices, Resolving Ethical Dilemmas (Continuum Intl Pub Group April 1998) ISBN 1-55778-754-9, ISBN 978-1-55778-754-5
- Mind Power (Prentice Hall 1987, IUniverse 2006)
- Mind Your Own Business: The Battle for Personal Privacy (Plenum 1995)
- The Open Door: Traveling in the U.S.S.R. (New World Library 1990).
- Positive Cash Flow : Complete Credit and Collections for the Small Business (Adams Media Corp December 1989) ISBN 1-55850-900-3, ISBN 978-1-55850-900-9
- Private Eyes: What Private Investigators Really Do (Paladin Press September 1994) ISBN 0-87364-782-3, ISBN 978-0-87364-782-3
- Resolving Conflict: With Others and Within Yourself (New Harbinger 1990, IUniverse 2006)
- Secrets of the Shaman: Further Explorations with the Leader of a Group Practicing Shamanism (New Falcon 1993, 2007)
- Shaman Warrior (New Falcon 1988)
- Shamanism and Personal Mastery: Using Symbols, Rituals, and Talismans to Activate the Powers Within You (Paragon House Publishers August 1991) ISBN 1-55778-381-0, ISBN 978-1-55778-381-3
- Shamanism for Everyone (Whitford Press March 1997) ISBN 0-914918-86-9, ISBN 978-0-914918-86-8
- The Small Business Credit and Collection Guide : Collect Overdue Bills, Establish Effective Credit Policies, and Maximize Your Cash Flow (Carol Pub Group March 1995) ISBN 0-8065-1621-6, ISBN 978-0-8065-1621-9
- Success in Multi-Level Marketing (Prentice Hall 1991)
- A Survival Guide for Managing the Employee From Hell (AMACOM 2006)
- The Survival Guide for Working With Bad Bosses (AMACOM 2005)
- The Survival Guide for Working With Humans (AMACOM 2004)
- 30 Days to a More Powerful Memory (AMACOM 2007)
- The Truth About Lying (Smart Publications 1994, IUniverse 2006)
- When I Grow Up I'd Like to Be a Sturgeon (Sasquatch 2007)
- Work it Right! (AMACOM 2003)
- Work With Me! Resolving Everyday Conflict in Your Organization (Davies-Black 2000)
- You the Jury : Deciding Guilt or Innocence in a Recovered Memory Case (iUniverse Inc. March 2008) ISBN 0-595-48585-5, ISBN 978-0-595-48585-7
