= Ann Toth =

American actress (1922–1991)

Ann (Anna Dolores) Toth (1922–1991) was a Hollywood starlet and friend of Mark Hansen who operated the Florentine Gardens in Hollywood. She befriended and roomed at the Carlos Avenue, Hollywood residence with Elizabeth Short, prior to Short's sensational murder on January 15, 1947.

On January 2, 1947, Short wrote to Toth requesting money. A few days later two men and a woman visited the home of Dorothy French, where Short resided at the time. Short appeared scared and panicky because of the visit. French stated that she did not want to answer the door and declined to see the persons.

According to Toth, Short was promised extra work in motion pictures and a role in NTG's next revue at the Florentine Gardens. Hansen denied any intimacy with Short, although she was rumored to be among his numerous girlfriends. Toth informed a 1949 grand jury assembled in Los Angeles that when Hansen was not close by, Short made furtive outgoing phone calls on the house phone at the Florentine Gardens.

Toth said that the man Short called was Maurice Clement. He was located in Beverly Hills and was an associate of Bugsy Siegel and Mickey Cohen. Clement worked for the talent department at Columbia Studios. Los Angeles District Attorney investigator Frank Jemison placed Clement #7 on his suspect list, which was revealed among the Black Dahlia files. Clement was known to be a contact of Brenda Allen. He worked with the Los Angeles madame in procuring prostitutes for the Syndicate.

Toth remarked to actor Kevin Wilkerson that Short was going to return to the eastern United States. Another person told her that Short intended to go to San Diego.
