= Clara Sears Taylor =

American writer, editor, publicist and government official

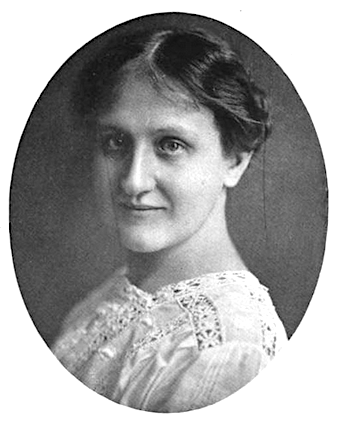
Clara Sears Taylor, from a 1914 publication.

Clara Sears Taylor (October 2, 1876 – August 31, 1954) was an American writer, editor, publicist, and government official, appointed in 1920 by President Woodrow Wilson to serve on the Washington D.C. rent commission. She was the first woman appointed to that office.

== Early life ==
Clara C. Sears was born in Denver, Colorado, the daughter of Jasper Peck Sears Jr., a businessman in Denver, and Annie Love George Sears Stevenson. Her father was born in Ohio and her mother's family was from Missouri.

== Career ==
Clara Sears Taylor was a journalist in Denver. She was a member of the Colorado Suffrage Association, and president of the Denver Woman's Press Club.

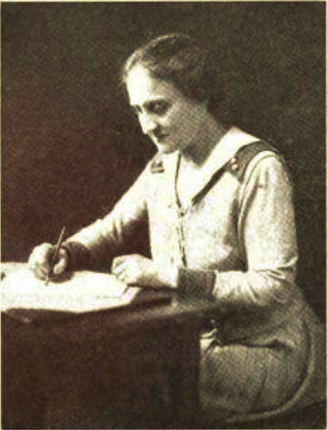
(1918)

During World War I, Taylor worked for the Creel Committee, as director of publicity for the women's division. She was later named acting director of publicity at the Department of Labor. "My job is to put war before them every day of their lives," she said of her readers. "To make them feel every day that their tasks are vital to the outcome. We have reached the stage that everyone must work, and work until the war is over."

Taylor was the first woman to serve as rent commissioner of Washington D. C., when she was appointed by Woodrow Wilson in 1920. "Mrs. Taylor's womanly judgment and sympathetic insights into family problems injects the workable, 'human' warmth," commented reporter Zoe Beckley. She was part of the so-called "Woman's Cabinet", a group of women in prominent government posts in Washington, immediately after women's suffrage was won. Among her controversial ideas, she proposed a federal tax on bachelors to encourage young men to marry. She was also concerned the low government wages were contributing to discouragement and immorality in the capital. She was on the advisory council of the 1923 Better Homes Week campaign chaired by Herbert Hoover.

== Personal life ==
Clara Sears married Eugene Whitman Taylor, a Denver newspaper editor, in 1901. They had two children, Sears and Eugenie. Clara was widowed in 1915. Her son Sears Taylor, a magazine editor, died in 1931. In 1938, she was living in the New York City household of her younger sister Lydia (called Lillie) and assisting her brother-in-law, drama critic Burns Mantle.
