= John P. St. John (police officer) =

American LAPD detective (1918–1995)

- Born: John Patrick St. John; February 8, 1918
- Died: May 3, 1995 (aged 77); Los Angeles County, California
- Other name: Jigsaw John
- Police career
- Country: United States
- Department: Los Angeles Police Department
- Service years: 1942–1993
- Rank: Sworn in as an Officer - 1942; Police Officer II; Police Officer III; Detective I Detective II; Detective III
- Awards: LAPD Distinguished Service Medal; numerous commendations for performance
- Other work: Technical advisor

John Patrick St. John (February 8, 1918 – May 3, 1995), better known as "Jigsaw John", was an American police officer and Los Angeles Police Department homicide detective, renowned for his investigations of many of Los Angeles's highest-profile murder cases. Upon his retirement in 1993, St. John held the highest seniority on the LAPD with fifty-one years of service, a distinction that earned him the privilege of carrying LAPD Detective badge No. 1.

== LAPD career ==
St. John served forty-three years as a homicide detective, beginning in 1949, when he was assigned to the Department's Homicide Division (merged to Robbery-Homicide in 1969). One of his first assignments was the notorious Black Dahlia murder, a case he worked on and off until his retirement in 1993. His nickname, Jigsaw John, originated in his early career with a dismemberment murder he solved in Griffith Park in which the victim had been cut up jigsaw-style. The moniker caught on because of his ability to piece clues together in difficult cases, resulting in many arrests and convictions. He became an authority on serial murders and worked twelve of them, including the 1950s serial killer Harvey Glatman, Night Stalker Richard Ramirez, the Hillside Stranglers, the Southside Slayer, and the William Bonin Freeway Killer case. In the latter, acting on a tip, St. John tracked down the Downey, California, truck driver and, on June 11, 1980, his team captured Bonin in the act of sodomizing a victim. The killer had his murder kit in the vehicle.

== Investigative technique ==
St. John was renowned within the Robbery-Homicide Division (RHD) for his amazing memory and dogged determination in working the minutiae that led to solving murders and getting convictions. However, as criminal science became more sophisticated, he kept up with the times, taking advantage of modern scientific crime analysis, forensic techniques, and the benefits of a new computerized age. Still, at times he simply fell back on that "dogged determination". In the Bonin case, although the killer was in custody, the DA's office was having trouble building a case, until one day Bonin received a letter from the mother of one of his victims begging him to tell her what happened to her son. He confessed to that and all of the other murders. As the trial date neared, St. John approached the deputy DA on the case and said, "I've got to tell you something. It wasn't the mother who wrote that letter."

== Fame ==
St. John's cases led Los Angeles Times writer Al Martinez to write the book Jigsaw John which became a 1976 NBC television series by the same name, starring veteran character actor Jack Warden. Over the course of his career, St. John solved at least two-thirds of the more than 1,000 homicides he worked including cop killings such as the famed Onion Fields murder, cop-turned-contract murderer William Leasure and myriad other cop killings, murders for money, gangland killings and drive-by shootings. In 1982, St. John became the second recipient of the LAPD's Distinguished Service Medal for his eight-year investigation resulting in the conviction of William Bonin. Bonin was executed by lethal injection in 1996, a year after his death.

== Death ==
St. John retired from the LAPD in May 1993, with the intention of becoming a technical advisor for the movie industry. "Jigsaw John" died of complications due to pneumonia and pancreatic cancer only two years later. According to his wife, Helen, he was still trying to solve the Black Dahlia case even a few weeks before his death. His funeral was a veritable "Who's Who" of LAPD's powerful and famous, including O. J. Simpson detectives Tom Lange and Philip Vannatter, as well as Judge Lance Ito, who presided over the Simpson criminal trial. LAPD's then Chief Willie L. Williams and his predecessor, Chief Daryl F. Gates (who worked with him as a young detective), eulogized him, Williams reinstating the detective to active duty as of May 2, 1995: "That he make his final journey as a detective of the Los Angeles Police Department." He lived in West Covina, CA.
