= Barilli =

Barilli is a surname. Notable people with the surname include:

- Bruno Barilli (1880–1952), Italian actor and composer
- Carlotta Barilli (1935–2020), Italian actress
- Cecrope Barilli (1839–1911), Italian painter
- Francesco Barilli (born 1943), Italian actor
- Giuseppe Barilli (1812–1894), Italian mathematician and politician
- Latino Barilli (1883–1961), Italian painter
- Mark Barilli (born 1973), Scottish darts player
- Milena Pavlović-Barili (1909–1945), Serbian painter and poet
