= Scoubidou (disambiguation) =

Scoubidou is a craft, threading and knotting plastic strips and tubes.

Scoubidou may also refer to:

- Scoubidou (song), a 1958 Sacha Distel song
- Scoubidou (tool), a corkscrew-like tool that is used for the commercial harvesting of seaweed

== See also ==
- Scooby-Doo (disambiguation)
