= Before the Revolution =

1964 film

- Film poster
- Directed by: Bernardo Bertolucci
- Written by: Bernardo Bertolucci; Gianni Amico
- Starring: Adriana Asti; Francesco Barilli
- Cinematography: Aldo Scavarda
- Edited by: Roberto Perpignani
- Music by: Ennio Morricone
- Distributed by: New Yorker Films (US, 1965)
- Release date: 12 May 1964
- Running time: 112 minutes
- Country: Italy
- Language: Italian

Before the Revolution (Italian: Prima della rivoluzione) is a 1964 Italian drama film directed by Bernardo Bertolucci. It stars Adriana Asti and Francesco Barilli and is centred on "political and romantic uncertainty among the youth of Parma". It premiered on 12 May 1964 at the 17th Cannes Film Festival during the International Critics' Week.

== Plot ==
In Parma in 1962, Fabrizio, a young student who has turned his interest to the aims of the Italian Communist Party, struggles with his middle class roots, questioning his engagement to Clelia, who is from the same social background and not interested in ideological concerns. He has a serious discussion with his best friend Agostino, who tells him of his hatred for his parents' way of life and is caught between relying on the Catholicism of his parents and the Marxist ideas touted by Fabrizio. Fabrizio urges Agostino to meet school teacher Cesare, who had helped him sharpen his own political beliefs.

Fabrizio's aunt Gina, his mother's younger sister from Milan and only slightly older than him, moves in with the family. Shortly after, Fabrizio is shocked to learn of Agostino's drowning in the Po River. He interviews local youths who were there when it happened and becomes convinced that Agostino committed suicide. Fabrizio imagines that his friend's hatred for his parents was really hatred of himself.

Fabrizio and Gina start an affair. He introduces her to Cesare, and they read from various philosophical works and reflect on Italy's fascist past. Gina believes that she is in love with Fabrizio but does not tell him, convinced that their relationship will not last. She has a nightly phone conversation with an unseen person whom she addresses as "doctor". Increasingly hysterical, she talks about her inability to sleep and her constant anxieties, and blames her collocutor for sending her away to Parma as a possible means to get rid of her.

A few days later, Fabrizio runs into Gina who is just coming out of a hotel with a man whom she had a short sexual encounter with. Fabrizio leaves angrily. Later that night, Gina soothes Fabrizio, telling him how glad she is that he is still not a mature man with a wife and family.

Fabrizio, Gina and Cesare meet with Puck, an old lover and friend of Gina's who has been living off land owned by his father his entire life and has never held a job. Facing bankruptcy and an uncertain future, he laments the changing times. When Fabrizio confronts him with his habitual attitude, Gina slaps Fabrizio for insulting Puck. Soon after, she returns to Milan.

At a communist rally in Parma's Parco Ducale, Fabrizio hints to Cesare his disillusionment with the party's ideas. Some time later, he marries Clelia, retaining the ties with his social milieu. At the wedding celebration, Gina is seen repeatedly kissing Fabrizio's younger brother Antonio.

== Cast ==
- Adriana Asti as Gina
- Francesco Barilli as Fabrizio
- Allen Midgette as Agostino
- Morando Morandini as Cesare
- Cristina Pariset as Clelia
- Cecrope Barilli as Puck
- Evelina Alpi as the little girl
- Gianni Amico as a friend
- Goliardo Padova as the painter

== Background and production ==
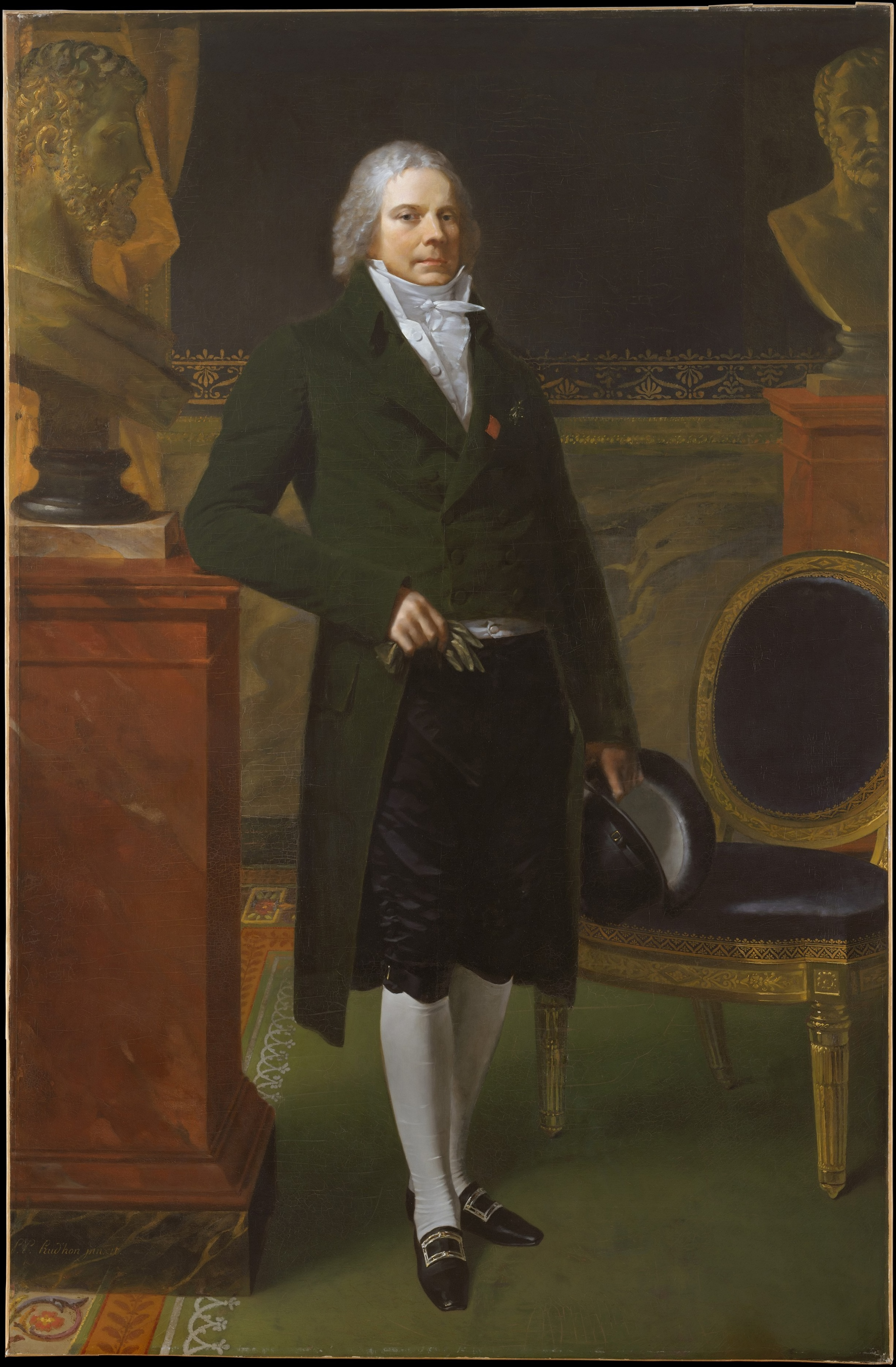
The film is based on a saying by Talleyrand.

The title of the film is derived from a saying by Charles Maurice de Talleyrand-Périgord: "Only those who lived before the revolution knew how sweet life could be". The names of some of the characters in the film are the same as those in Stendhal's novel The Charterhouse of Parma: The book's principal character and narrator, Fabrice del Dongo, is now Fabrizio, his aunt Gina Sanseverina is Gina, and Clélia Conti is Clelia.

The film, strongly influenced by the French New Wave, was shot between September and November 1963. The shooting took place in Parma and its surroundings, one scene being filmed in the camera ottica (optical chamber) at the Sanvitale Fortress in Fontanellato.

== Themes ==
Like Marco Bellocchio's Fists in the Pocket (I pugni in tasca), which was released the following year, Before the Revolution is considered a precursor of the protests of 1968. Luana Ciavola, author of Revolutionary Desire in Italian Cinema, writes that like I pugni in tasca, the film gives the impression of coming from within the bourgeoisie, but at the same time being against it, although notes that the way it approaches revolt differs. She writes of it:

In Prima della rivoluzione the revolt of the protagonist finds support in political commitment. Sustained by an erotic desire, the revolt is fostered by the political ideology that provides a raison d'etre as well as a symbolic terrain through which to articulate the revolt. Even more, the ideology, embodied by Cesare, provides Fabrizio with a superior meaning with which to confront and shape his rebel self. Through ideology, Fabrizio spells out and clarifies his course of revolt and singularity of rebel subject, and eventually his desire for revolt.

David Jenkins, the critic from TimeOut, notes that as in "all of Bertolucci's movies, there's a central conflict between the 'radical' impulses and a pessimistic (and/or willing) capitulation to the mainstream of bourgeois society and culture".

Eugene Archer of The New York Times writes that Bertolucci attempted a "symbolic autobiography" in his classical construction of the film. He highlights loss and defeat as notable themes, with the failure at love symbolizing "a death of the past, an angst-ridden sense of futility in any kind of revolutionary striving, whether emotional, political or merely intellectual, amid the defeat of contemporary society". Peter Bradshaw of The Guardian notes that the film displays a "distinctively patrician concern with Catholicism and Marxism". One critic notes how "Bertolucci uses poetic sounds and images to try to communicate emotions and ideas, rather than plot, such as in the disturbing final scene where Fabrizio and Clelia's wedding is intercut with Cesare reading Moby-Dick to a class of youngsters, as a tearful Gina hugs and kisses".

== Release and reception ==
Before the Revolution premiered on 12 May 1964 at the 17th Cannes Film Festival during the International Critics' Week. Although it is now seen as belonging to the Italian Nouvelle Vague, Before the Revolution did not attract large audiences in Italy where it only received lukewarm approval from most of the critics. It did however enjoy an enthusiastic reception abroad. It has since become widely acclaimed by critics, and praised for its technical merit, although generally not viewed quite as well as some of Bertolucci's later films, due to his youth and lack of experience at the time.

The film is cited as "one of the masterpieces of Italian cinema" by Film4, and it is featured in the book 1001 Movies You Must See Before You Die, where Colin MacCabe refers to it as "the perfect portrait of the generation who were to embrace revolt in the late 1960s, and a stunning portrait of Parma—Bertolucci's own city". As of May 2015, it has a 92% rating on Rotten Tomatoes, based on 11 reviews. A retrospective of the film was given at the BFI Southbank in London. Eugene Archer of The New York Times notes that Bertolucci used many cinematic references in the film to Italian and French realist master directors such as Roberto Rossellini and Alain Resnais, and managed to "assimilate a high degree of filmic and literary erudition into a distinctively personal visual approach", showing "outstanding promise" as a filmmaker.

David Jenkins of TimeOut, was less favorable, and stated that although it is a "leisurely, verbose and stylish film made by thinkers for thinkers, the film "feels like it’s caught between two stools: it lacks the acute social observation found in Bertolucci’s stunning debut, The Grim Reaper (1963), but it also fails to achieve the levels of free-flowing fizz displayed in his follow-up, Partner (1968)". He did, however, praise "the virtuoso camerawork, Ennio Morricone’s rippling score and the melancholy reminder that for the young and politically engaged, the ‘revolution’ is always just over the horizon".

Critic John Simon called Before the Revolution "murky, pretentious, and juvenile".
