= Francesco Barilli =

Italian actor, film director, screenwriter and painter

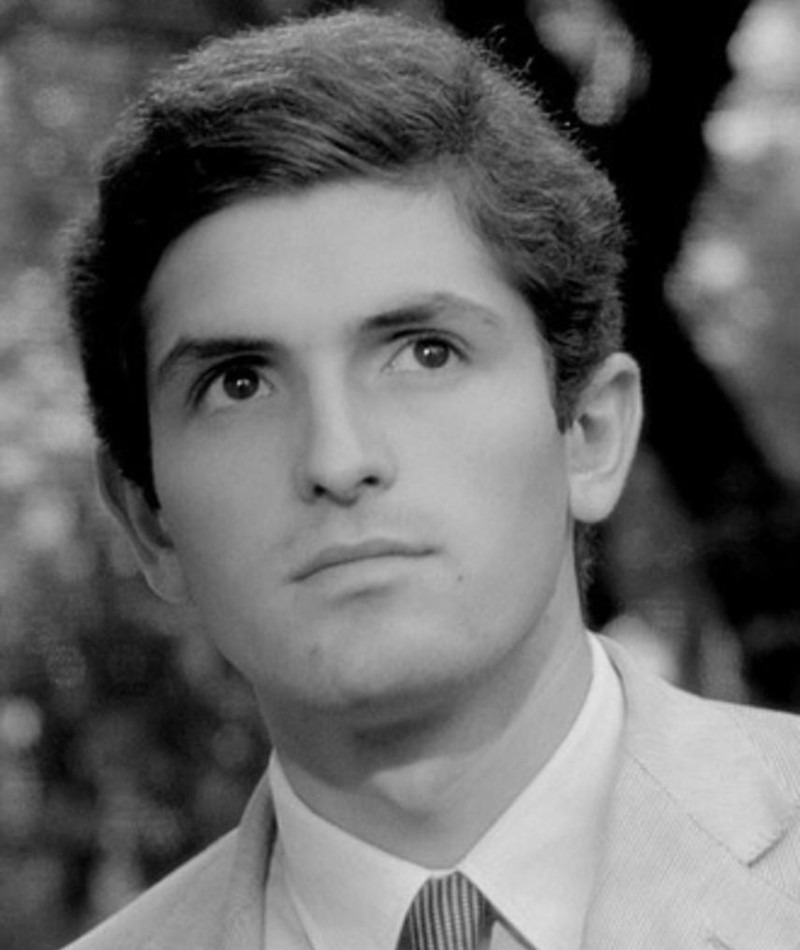
- Francesco Barilli
- Born: 4 February 1943 (age 83); Parma, Italy
- Education: Academy of Fine Arts of Parma
- Occupations: Film director, screenwriter, painter, actor
- Relatives: Cecrope Barilli (uncle); Bruno Barilli (great-uncle); Milena Pavlović-Barili (aunt)

Francesco Barilli (born 4 February 1943) is an Italian filmmaker, documentarian, painter, and actor.

== Early life and education ==
Born in Parma, Barilli was born in a long line of painters and artists, a grand-nephew of Bruno Barilli and Cecrope Barilli, a nephew of Milena Pavlović-Barili, and a cousin of actress Carlotta Barilli. His sister Evelina is a costume designer. He was childhood friends with Bernardo Bertolucci. He studied at the Academy of Fine Arts of Parma.

== Career ==
After graduating, Barilli worked as an assistant to filmmaker Antonio Pietrangeli on the film The Girl from Parma (1963), in which he also played a small role. He was subsequently cast by his old friend Bernardo Bertolucci in the lead role of the director's 1964 film Before the Revolution.

Through Bertolucci, he befriended filmmaker brothers Luigi and Camillo Bazzoni and cinematographer Vittorio Storaro, and moved to Rome, where he worked as an art director and assistant director. He notably was Pier Paolo Pasolini's assistant director for The Hawks and the Sparrows (1966).

In 1968, he directed the short film Nardino sul Po. He wrote the screenplay for the giallo Who Saw Her Die? and the cannibal film Man from the Deep River, both in 1972. In 1974, he made his feature directorial debut with The Perfume of the Lady in Black, a Rosemary's Baby-inspired psychological horror film starring "scream queen" Mimsy Farmer. The film has developed a cult following among horror film fans. Barilli stated he was offered several projects afterwards, but turned them down, feeling he was not able to make the films he wanted to. In 1978 he directed another horror film, Pensione paura, which was a commercial disappointment and led Barilli to abandon directing for several years to refocus on painting.

During the following decades, Barilli produced and directed many documentaries for RAI. In 1991, he directed a segment of the anthology film Especially on Sunday. He also wrote the story for the erotic thriller The Trap (1985), directed by Giuseppe Patroni Griffi. In 2002, he directed the RAI miniseries Giorni da Leone starring Luca Barbareschi, which was a success and spawned a sequel series in 2006, also directed by Barilli. He also directed commercials, for brands like Bauli and Fiat, and industrial films.

In 2023, Barilli directed his first theatrical feature film in over 40 years, Il paese del melodramma.

In addition to directing and painting, Barilli has also acted in films by directors like Carlos Saura and Gianni Amelio.

== Partial filmography ==
Film
Year	Title	Role	Notes
1963	The Girl from Parma		
1964	Before the Revolution	Fabrizio	
1972	Man from the Deep River		Screenwriter
1974	The Perfume of the Lady in Black		Director, screenwriter
1978	Pensione paura		Director
1992	Sabato italiano	Roberto – il boss – episode No. 1	
1996	Uomini senza donne	Dante	
2008	Il solitario	Mirco Cassiani	
2009	Io, Don Giovanni	Vescovo	
2011	The Last Fashion Show	Commissioner	
2012	La casa nel vento dei morti	Ugo	
2023	Il paese del melodramma	Giorgio Gandolfi	Director, screenwriter
