= Scoobies =

The name Scoobies can refer to:

- Scoubidous, a toy made of coloured plastic strands
- The "Mystery, Inc." gang from the animated television series Scooby-Doo
- The main protagonists of the television series Buffy: The Vampire Slayer
