= Pensione paura =

- Directed by: Francesco Barilli
- Screenplay by: Barbara Alberti; Amedeo Pagani; Francesco Barilli
- Story by: Barbara Alberti; Amedeo Pagani
- Produced by: Tommaso Dazzi; Paolo Fornasier; Tadeo Villalba; José Gutiérrez Maesso
- Starring: Leonora Fani; Luc Merenda
- Cinematography: Gualtiero Manozzi
- Edited by: Amedeo Salfa
- Music by: Adolfo Waitzman
- Production companies: Aleph Cinematografica; Alexandra Films S.A.
- Distributed by: Variety Distribution
- Release date: 16 February 1978 (Italy)
- Running time: 100 minutes
- Countries: Italy; Spain

Pensione paura (lit. 'Hotel Fear') is a 1978 film directed by Francesco Barilli.

== Plot ==
A young girl and her mother run a hotel during the war. The girl finds herself at the mercy of her sex-crazed guests and matters become worse when her mother dies. Soon after, a cloaked figure starts killing off everyone that tries to harm her.

== Cast ==
- Leonora Fani as Rosa
- Luc Merenda as Rodolfo
- Lidia Biondi as Marta
- Francisco Rabal as Marta's Lover
- Jole Fierro as Rodolfo's Lover
- Wolfango Soldati
- Máximo Valverde

== Production ==
After directing The Perfume of the Lady in Black, it took four years for director Francesco Barilli to return to directing. Barilli stated this was because he was not allowed to make the film he wanted to make, but was offered several different projects to work at. One film Barilli wanted to make was titled L'occhio, when he was approached by producer Tommaso Dazzi who deemed L'occhio too expensive, and presented him with the treatment for Pensione paura. Barilli admitted to needing the money and took the offer to direct the film.

Filming started in Manziana in August 1977. Barilli and producer Tommaso Dazzi often argued on set as Barilli shot scenes that were not in the script, which Barilli did not care for as he wanted to shoot the film the way he wanted to.

The film had an unusual setting, which film historian Roberto Curti described as "one-of-a-kind work" that did not fit into the mold of a gothic, giallo, or psychological drama but encompassed elements of all the genres.

== Release ==
Pensione paura was distributed theatrically in Italy by Euro International Films on 16 February 1978. The film grossed a total of 82,645,242 Italian lire domestically. Curti described the film a commercial flop. Barilli commented the producer who sold the film to Euro International Films went bankrupt shortly after. The film was released in Spain where it was promoted as an erotic film La violación de la señorita Julia. It was Barelli's last theatrically released film, as the director dedicated himself to painting afterwards.

== See also ==
- List of Italian films of 1978
