= Viale della canzone =

- Directed by: Tullio Piacentini
- Cinematography: Federico Zanni
- Music by: Alessandro Brugnolini; Pino Donaggio
- Release date: 1965
- Running time: 85 minutes
- Country: Italy
- Language: Italian

Viale della canzone is a 1965 Italian "musicarello" film directed and written by Tullio Piacentini.

== Cast ==
- Marisa Solinas
- Bobby Solo
- Roby Ferrante
- Edoardo Vianello
- Peppino Di Capri
- Los Marcellos Ferial
- Ricky Gianco
- Sacha Distel
- Roberto Murolo
- Pino Donaggio
- Marino Marini
- Nico Fidenco
- Mario Zelinotti
- Nicola Di Bari
- Jimmy Fontana
- Vanna Brosio
