= Marisa Solinas =

Italian actress and singer (1939–2019)

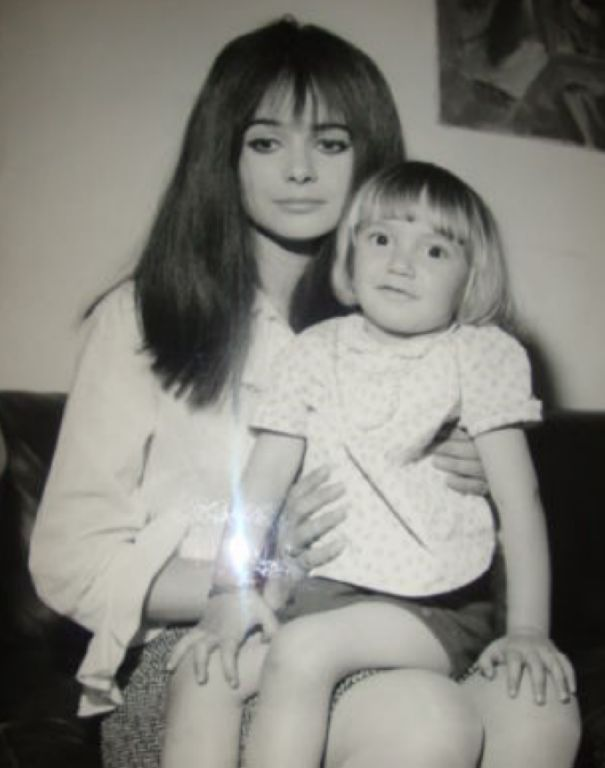
- Marisa Solinas with her son David (1967)

Background information
- Birth name: Marisa Anna Solinas
- Born: 30 May 1939; Genoa, Italy
- Died: 12 February 2019 (aged 79); Rome, Italy
- Genres: Beat music, Pop music
- Occupation: Singer-songwriter
- Instrument: Vocals
- Years active: 1964–2019

Marisa Anna Solinas (30 May 1939 – 12 February 2019), best known as Marisa Solinas, was an Italian actress and singer.

== Life ==
Born in Genoa to a Sardinian father and a Tuscan mother from Garfagnana. In her teen years, she dreamed about becoming an opera singer and enrolled in Teatro Carlo Felice. Later she decided to concentrate on the pop music genre, in 1960, accompanied by mother, she transferred to Milan, where she made her film debut in 1961. The first big success to her career happened a year later, when she was spotted by Mario Monicelli and cast to be the main actress in "Renzo e Luciana", one of the four episodes of Boccaccio '70; the same year she appeared in Bernardo Bertolucci's film debut, La commare secca and acted on stage in Fogli d'album at the Festival dei Due Mondi. Later she starred in a large number of genre films, especially Spaghetti Westerns, and appeared in several successful TV-series.

Solinas was nicknamed the Phoenix of Italian cinema because she reimagined herself several times, always with great success transforming into some different kind of performer.

As a photomodel, Solinas made 750 covers, and posed for Gina Lollobrigida's photobooks and projects.

She was also a singer, and published two albums and several singles, one of these released by La voce del padrone.

On set of Boccaccio '70, she met Luigi Tenco. For many years, they remained close friends. After the death of Tenco, she claimed that his demise was not least because of a 6 mln debt he owed to pay a bribe to Sanremo Music Festival management team, and his frustration about clandestine gambling on the results. The Sanremo team sued Solinas in the Spring of 1967. The actress also received threats to hurt her son Davide in attempt to pressure her to retain the statement.

She died on 12 February 2019, at the age of 79.

== Selected filmography ==
- 1961 — Scano Boa, directed by Renato Dall'Ara
- 1962 — Boccaccio '70, directed by Mario Monicelli
- 1962 — Il peccato, directed by Jorge Grau
- 1962 — La commare secca, directed by Bernardo Bertolucci
- 1964 — Senza sole né luna, directed by Luciano Ricci
- 1965 — Viale della canzone, directed by Tullio Piacentini
- 1966 — Honeymoon, Italian Style, directed by Mario Amendola
- 1967 — Colt in the Hand of the Devil, directed by Sergio Bergonzelli
- 1967 — The Head of the Family, directed by Nanni Loy
- 1971 — Blindman, directed by Ferdinando Baldi
- 1973 — My Pleasure Is Your Pleasure, directed by Claudio Racca
- 1974 — L'arbitro, directed by Luigi Filippo D'Amico
- 1984 — Everybody in Jail, directed by Alberto Sordi
- 1984 — I due carabinieri, directed by Carlo Verdone
- 2000 — Almost Blue, directed by Alex Infascelli
