= Boccaccio '70 =

1962 film

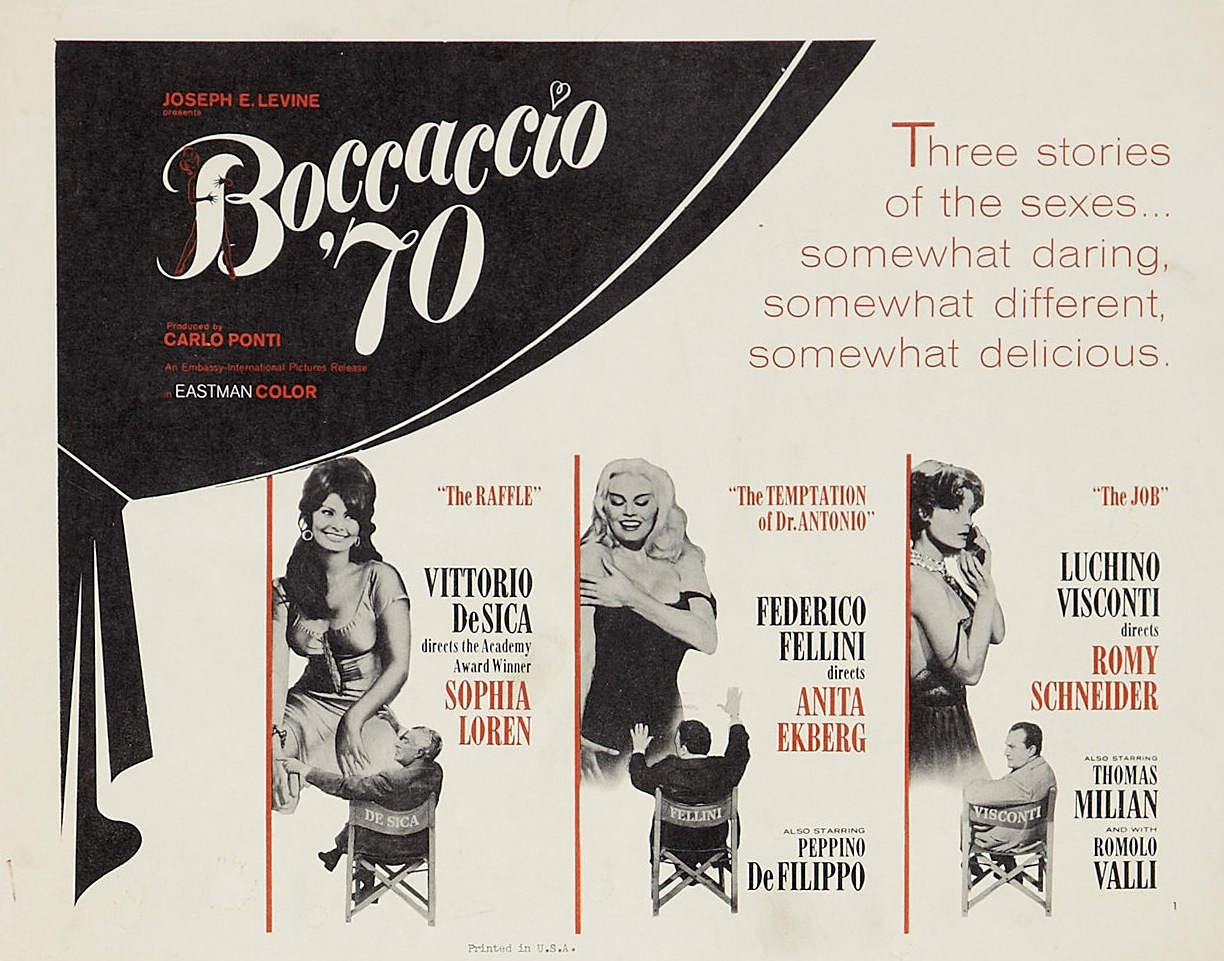
- US film poster
- Directed by: Vittorio De Sica; Federico Fellini; Mario Monicelli; Luchino Visconti
- Written by: Suso Cecchi d'Amico; Mario Monicelli; Italo Calvino; Giovanni Arpino; Tullio Pinelli; Federico Fellini; Ennio Flaiano; Luchino Visconti; Cesare Zavattini
- Produced by: Carlo Ponti; Antonio Cervi
- Starring: Sophia Loren; Anita Ekberg; Peppino De Filippo; Marisa Solinas; Germano Giglioli; Romy Schneider; Thomas Milian; Romolo Valli
- Music by: Nino Rota; Armando Trovajoli; Piero Umiliani
- Production companies: Concordia Compagnia Cinematografica; Francinex-Gray Film
- Distributed by: Cineriz (Italy); Cinédis (France)
- Release dates: 23 February 1962 (Italy); 29 August 1962 (France)
- Running time: 150 minutes (release with 3 segments); 208 minutes (Italian version with all four segments)
- Countries: Italy; France
- Languages: German; Italian
- Budget: $2.5 million

Boccaccio '70 is a 1962 comedy anthology film directed by Vittorio De Sica, Federico Fellini, Mario Monicelli and Luchino Visconti from an idea by Cesare Zavattini. It consists of four episodes, each by one of the directors, all about a different aspect of morality and love in modern times. The episodes are intended to evoke the style of Giovanni Boccaccio's 14th century Decameron, although the stories are not based directly on tales from that collection.

== Plot ==
=== Renzo e Luciana ===
Directed by Mario Monicelli. Written by Giovanni Arpino, Italo Calvino, Suso Cecchi d'Amico and Mario Monicelli, after a short story by Calvino. Music by Piero Umiliani. With Marisa Solinas and Germano Giglioli.

In Renzo e Luciana (Renzo and Luciana), a young couple tries to hide their marriage and the wife’s supposed pregnancy from the Draconian rules at their place of employment, which has banned female employees from getting married and having children. Their efforts – both at their shared home (having temporarily moved into her family's crowded apartment), and at work (where they go so far as to pretend not to know each other) – causes pressure to mount on the couple. Their hope is to make it through until they have managed to save some money to move out, and are dependent on Renzo going to night school to become an accountant. Finally, their life together has some privacy, but they are increasingly separated by their respective shifts: he returns home from work just when she has to leave to go there.

This first episode was only included in the Italian distribution of the film. Out of solidarity toward Monicelli, the other three directors did not go to the Cannes Film Festival for the presentation of the film.

=== Le Tentazioni del Dottor Antonio ===
Directed by Federico Fellini. Written by Fellini, Ennio Flaiano and Tullio Pinelli. Music by Nino Rota. With Peppino De Filippo and Anita Ekberg.

In Le Tentazioni del Dottor Antonio (The Temptation of Dr Antonio), Dr Antonio Mazzuolo, a middle-aged man, has taken it upon himself to be the protector of Rome's morality and law and order from what he sees as vice, crime and immorality throughout the city. The doctor (in his tiny Fiat equipped with a police spotlight) wages his one-man crusade – shining the spotlight at lovers in parked cars, or bounding on stage of a cabaret, ordering the stage crew (which includes a smiling police officer) to shut the lights, as he closes the curtain behind a line of bewildered chorus girls. He admonishes the audience to 'go home, and spend (their) money' in a 'better way instead of seeing this filth.' His anger knows no bounds when a provocative billboard of Anita Ekberg with the tag line "drink more milk" is put up in a park near his residence. Little does he know how the billboard will impact his life. Throughout the film, children are heard singing the jingle "Bevete più latte, bevete più latte!" ("Drink more milk!"). The image begins to haunt him with hallucinations in which Ekberg appears as a gigantic temptress. After his delirium culminates in throwing a spear at Ekberg's image, he is found collapsed on top of the billboard and transported away in an ambulance to the children's song.

=== Il Lavoro ===
Directed by Luchino Visconti. Written by Suso Cecchi d'Amico and Visconti. Music by Nino Rota. With Romy Schneider, Tomas Milian, and Romolo Valli.

Il Lavoro (The Job), is about an aristocratic couple. The husband is caught by the press visiting prostitutes. After saying, she intends from then on to work for her income, the wife demands payment from her husband for her sexual services, to which he agrees.

=== La Riffa ===
Directed by Vittorio De Sica. Written by Cesare Zavattini. Music by Armando Trovajoli. With Sophia Loren.

In La Riffa (The Raffle), a timid lottery winner is entitled to one night with the attractive Zoe (Sophia Loren). Zoe, however, has other plans.

== Cast ==
- Marisa Solinas as Luciana
- Germano Giglioli as Renzo
- Peppino De Filippo as Dr. Antonio Mazzuolo
- Anita Ekberg as herself
- Romy Schneider as Pupe
- Tomas Milian as Ottavio
- Romolo Valli as Zacchi
- Sophia Loren as Zoe
