= Carlotta Barilli =

Italian actress (1935–2020)

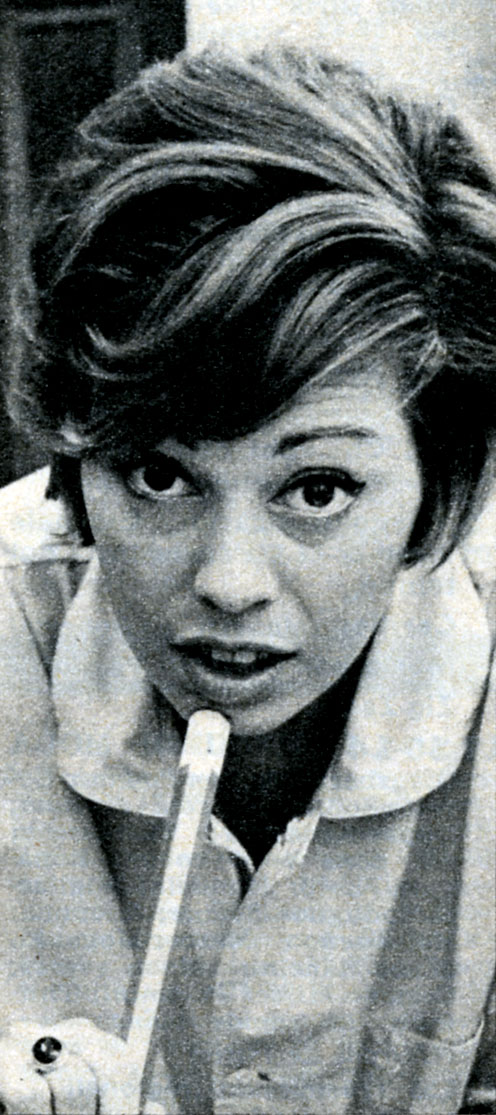
- Born: 2 September 1935; Parma, Italy
- Died: 15 July 2020 (aged 84); Rome, Italy
- Occupation: Actress

Carlotta Barilli (2 September 1935 – 15 July 2020) was an Italian actress. She was born in Parma, Italy. Barilli was known for her roles in Ragazzi del Juke-Box (1959), Howlers in the Dock (1960) and La commare secca (1962). She appeared in the film Novecento, directed by Bernardo Bertolucci.

== Biography ==
Carlotta was a granddaughter of the famous music critic and composer, Bruno Barilli, great-granddaughter of the painter Cecrope Barilli and the niece of Milena Pavlović-Barili, the most notable female artist of Serbian modernism.

She first went to join roles in theater and radio from the 1960s to 1970's. This included starring in the 1961 radio performance Adelchi alongside Vittorio Gassman and again with him later in film roles in Un Marziano a Roma.

== Death ==
Barilli died on 15 July 2020 in Rome, aged 84.
