= Sacha Distel =

French musician and singer (1933–2004)

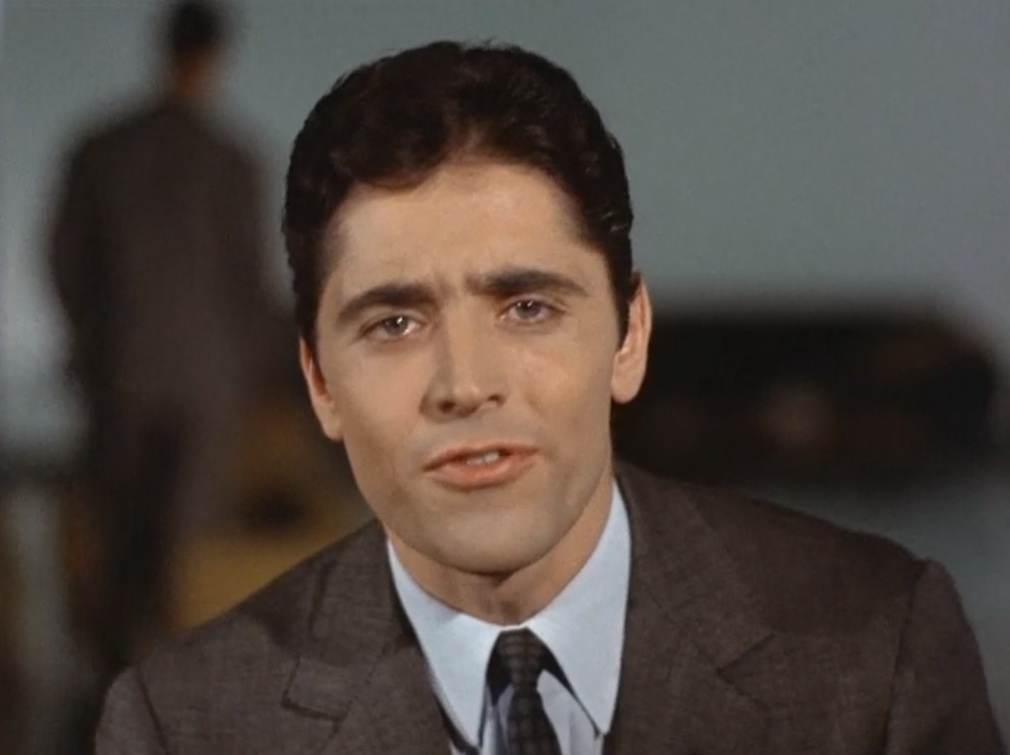
- Distel in Viale della canzone (1965)

Background information
- Born: Alexandre Distel; 29 January 1933; Paris, France
- Died: 22 July 2004 (aged 71) Rayol-Canadel, France
- Genres: Pop; rock; jazz
- Occupations: Musician; singer; actor
- Instruments: Guitar; vocals
- Years active: 1950–2004

Alexandre "Sacha" Distel (29 January 1933 – 22 July 2004) was a French musician and singer who had hits with a cover version of "Raindrops Keep Falling on My Head" in 1970, which reached No. 10 on the UK charts, "Scoubidou", and "The Good Life". He was made Chevalier (Knight) of the Légion d'honneur in 1997. He had also scored a hit as a songwriter when Tony Bennett recorded "The Good Life" in 1963. It peaked at No. 18 on Billboard's Hot 100 chart and reached the top 10 of the Easy Listening chart.

He was referenced in the 1969 hit song Where Do You Go To (My Lovely)? by Peter Sarstedt.

== Career ==
Distel was the son of Russian-Jewish émigré Ioyina Léonide Distel who was born in Odesa, Ukraine, and French-Jewish pianist Andrée Ventura (1902–1965), born in Constantinople. His uncle was bandleader Ray Ventura. After Ventura settled in Paris with his orchestra Les Collégiens, Distel gave up piano and switched to guitar.

During his career, Distel worked with Kenny Clarke, Jimmy Gourley, Lionel Hampton, Slide Hampton, Bobby Jaspar, Barney Kessel, John Lewis, Pierre Michelot, Bernard Peiffer, Henri Renaud, Fats Sadi, Art Simmons, Martial Solal, René Urtreger, and Barney Wilen.

In addition to his musical career he also did some acting, primarily on French television. He had a cameo appearance in the 1960 film Zazie dans le Métro. He appeared in a production of Fallen Angels by Noël Coward on British television in 1974.

== Personal life ==
After Brigitte Bardot accepted Distel's invitation to his birthday party in Saint-Tropez in 1958, the two began a much-publicized relationship that lasted until 1959. In 1963, he married champion Olympic skier Francine Bréaud. Distel publicly stated that he remained faithful to his wife: "Anything I want in a woman I can get at home."

== Death ==
Distel died of cancer at the age of 71 on 22 July 2004 at his mother-in-law's home in Rayol-Canadel, near Saint-Tropez, France.

== Discography ==
- Afternoon in Paris with John Lewis (1957), Atlantic
- Everybody Loves the Lover (1961), Philips
- From Paris with Love (1962), RCA Victor
- Les Filles Moi J'Aime Ca! (1963), RCA
- The Good Life (1969), Kapp
- Back to Jazz with Slide Hampton (1969), La Voix de Son Maitre
- Sacha Distel (1970), Warner Bros. - UK #21
- Close to You (1970), Warner Bros.
- More and More (1971), Warner Bros.
- Love Music (1973), Polydor
- Swing with Sacha Distel (1973), Contour
- Love Is All (1976), Pye
- Forever and Ever (1978), Carrere
- From Sacha with Love (1979), Mercury
- Amour Tout Court (1982), DRG
- My Guitar and All That Jazz (1983), Pablo
- Move Closer (1985), Towerbell
- Ecoute Mes Yeux (1998), Arcade Music
- But Beautiful (2003), Mercury
- When I Fall in Love (2004), UCJ - UK #79

== See also ==
Scoubidou - a type of hobby knotcraft named after his song of the same name.
