= Scooby-Doo (disambiguation) =

Scooby-Doo is a series of animated television programs.

Scooby-Doo may also refer to:

- Scooby-Doo (character), the titular Great Dane of the series
- Scooby-Doo (film), a 2002 live-action film based on the Scooby-Doo series
- Scooby-Doo (soundtrack), a soundtrack album from the film
- Scooby-Doo Spooky Coaster, a roller coaster
- Scooby's Ghoster Coaster, a roller coaster
- Scooby-Doo (video game), video game based on the Scooby-Doo series
- Scoobi doo, another name for cavatappi
- Scooby, a colloquial name for the Subaru Impreza
- Woodstock Express, a roller coaster originally named "Scooby Doo"
- Feelin' So Good (S.K.O.O.B.Y.-D.O.O.), a song by The Archies

== See also ==
- List of Scooby-Doo media
- Scooby (disambiguation)
- Scoubidou (disambiguation)
