= Scooby =

Scooby may refer to:

- Scooby-Doo (character), an animated television character also called Scooby
- Scooby Web Calendar, the former code name for Web UI of the Cosmo Web Calendar project from the Open Source Applications Foundation
- Rhyming slang term for the Japanese car manufacturer Subaru
- Nickname of Cristián Castañeda (born 1968), Chilean retired footballer
- Nickname of Philip Scooby Wright (born 1994), American football player

== See also ==
- Scooby-Doo (disambiguation)
