= Latino Barilli =

Italian painter (1883–1961)

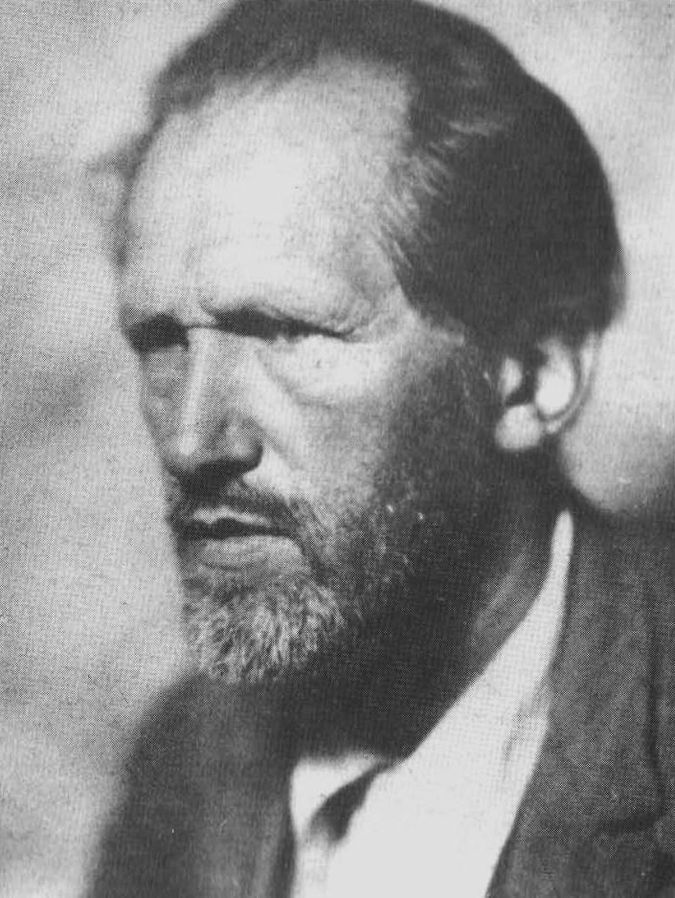
Photo of Latino Barilli, circa 1920

Latino Barilli (1883 – 1961) was an Italian painter.

== Biography ==
Latino was born in Parma, son of the painter Cecrope Barilli, who became director of the Parmesan Academy of Fine Arts in 1889. Latino had a retrospective exhibition at the Galleria Nazionale di Parma in 1963. He was younger brother of Bruno Barilli, an Italian actor and music composer and uncle of Milena Pavlović-Barili, the most notable female artist of Serbian modernism.
