= Bruno Barilli =

Italian composer

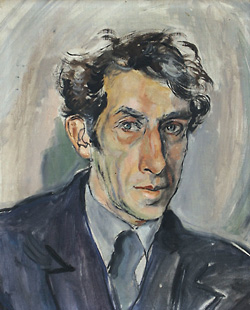
Portrait of Bruno Barilli, painted by his daughter Milena (1938)

Bruno Barilli (14 December 1880 – 15 April 1952) was an Italian actor and music composer, and best remembered for his writings on music and music composition.

== Biography ==
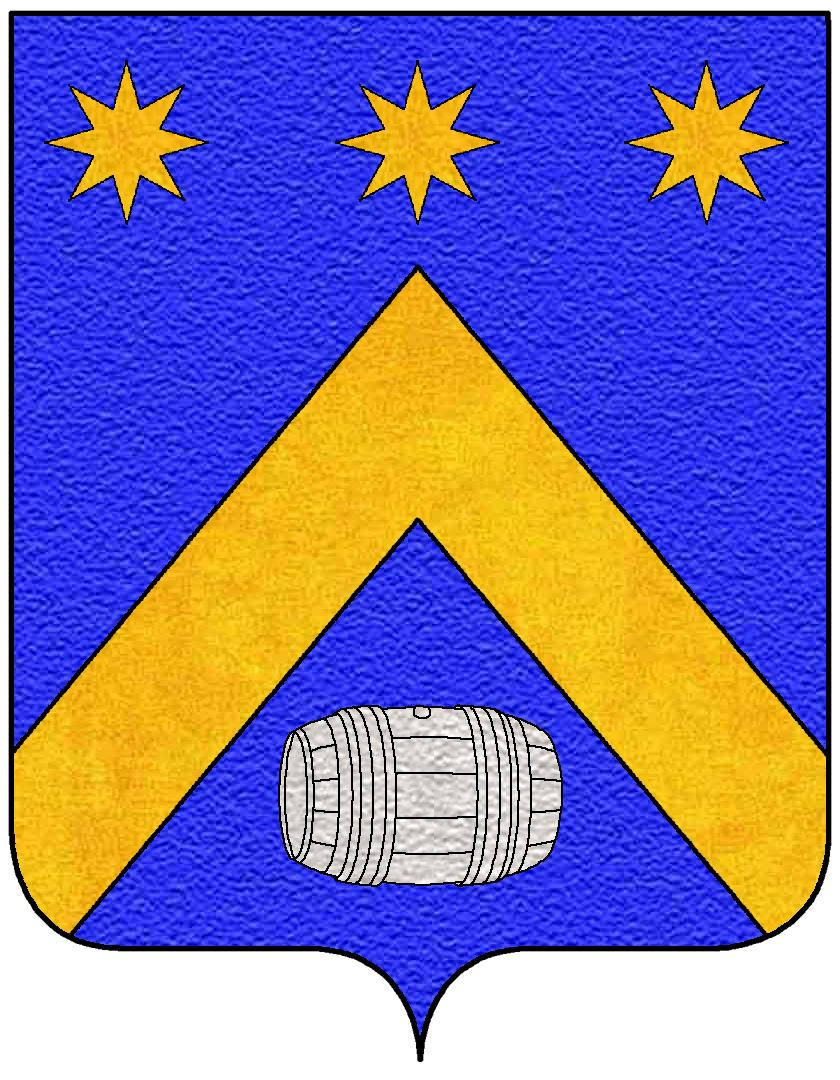
Coat of arms of the Barili family

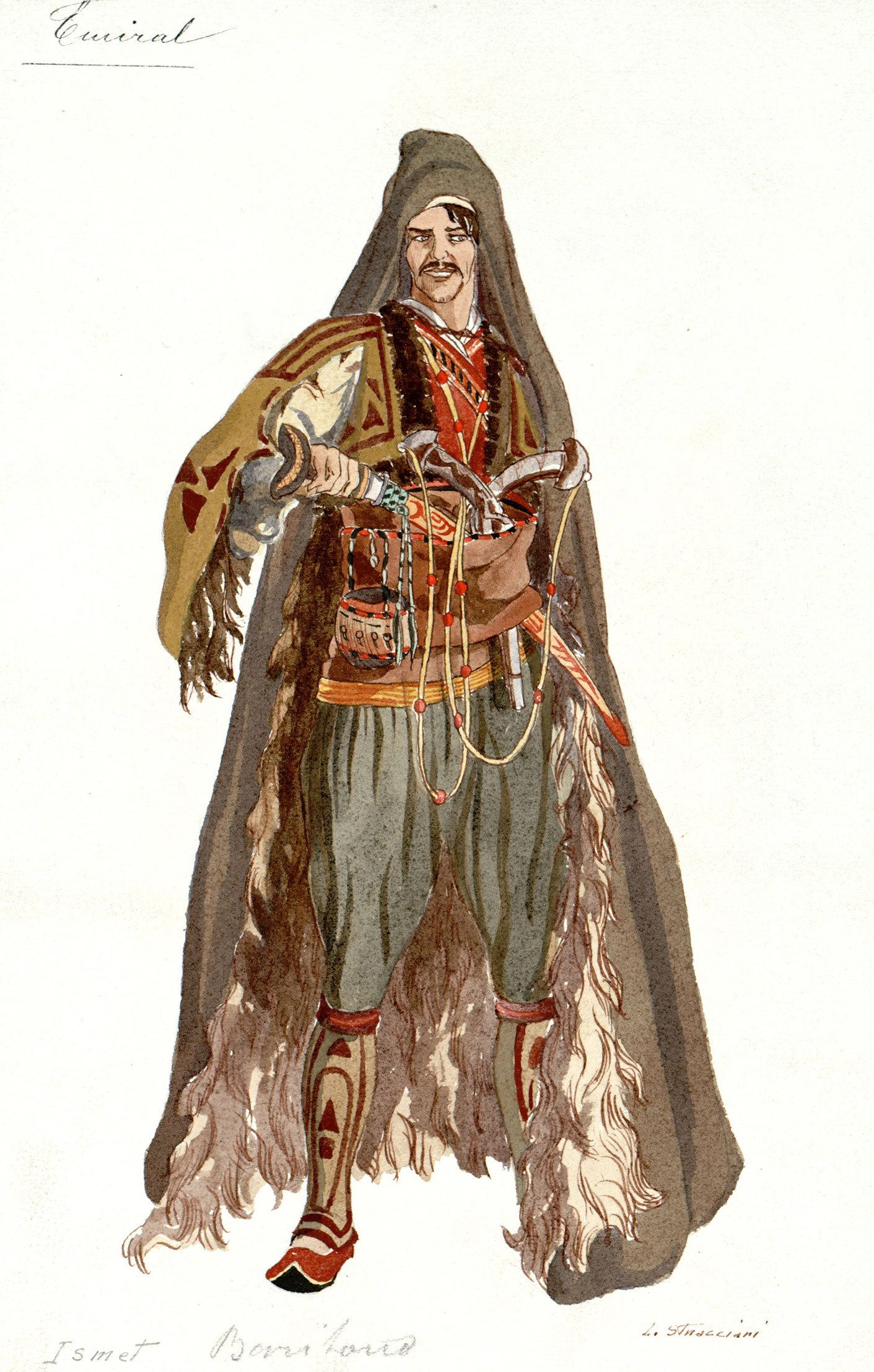
Ismet (baritono), costume design for Emiral (1924).

He was born in Fano in the region of Marche, Italy, as the son of a Parmesan painter Cecrope Barilli and his wife, Anna Adanti. As a member of a noted family that, for centuries gave a lot of artists, he studied musical composition at the Arrigo Boito Conservatory at Parma. From there, he gained the position of conducting the orchestra at the Dirigentschule in Munich. There he married Danica Pavlović, descendant of the Karađorđević dynasty and second cousin of the King Petar I of Serbia. Together they had one daughter, Milena Pavlović-Barili, who became a prominent Serbian painter. Returning to Italy in 1910, Barilli composed the opera Medusa with libretto by Ottone Schanzer. In 1914, the opera was awarded at the MacCormick competition. Barilli wrote the music and libretto for the opera Emiral (1915), awarded a prize in a Roman competition judged by Giacomo Puccini. As an actor, he is known for his performance in La Rosa (1921).

But Barilli is known mainly for his prolific writing and editing as a music critic for numerous journals including La Concordia(1915–16); Il Tempo (1917–22); Corriere italiano (1923–24); Il Tevere (1925-33); Gazzetta del Popolo; Risorgimento liberale; L'Unità, and others. He was a member of the editorial board of the Rome-based magazine La Ronda between 1919 and 1922. His essays, both on music and travel, have been published in collected form in books titled Delirama (1924); Il sorcio nel violino (1926); Il paese del melodramma (1931); Lo spettatore stralunato: cronache cinematografiche; Il sole in trappola: diario del periplo dell'Africa (1931); Il paese del melodramma; and Capricci di vegliardo among others.

During the early decades of the twentieth century, he was living in the Villa Strohl Fern, and active in the Roman artistic circles that habitually met at the Caffè Aragno on Via del Corso, a café known as the rendezvous of the city's literary and artistic elite. Here he met with friends Emilio Cecchi, Antonio Baldini, and Vincenzo Cardarelli, but also encountered Ungaretti, Carlo Socrate, Soffici, Pasqualina Spadini, Mario Broglio, Armando Ferri, Quirino Ruggeri, Roberto Longhi, Riccardo Francalancia, and Aurelio Saffi. Barilli's portrait was painted in 1928 by Massimo Campigli.

In 1925, he signed on to the Manifesto of the Fascist Intellectuals, written by Giovanni Gentile. Barilli seems to have ultimately soured on his support for fascism. From 1939 al 1941, he collaborated in the weekly Oggi, whose editor was Arrigo Benedetti till the journal was suppressed by the authorities.

His father Cecrope Barilli was a painter, his brothers Arnaldo and Latino were respectively an art historian and a painter. His granddaughter Carlotta (1935-2020) was an actress, and his grand-nephew Francesco (born 1943) is an actor and film director.

He died on 15 April 1952, in Rome.
