= Scoubidou (tool) =

A Scoubidou is a corkscrew-like tool that is used for the commercial harvesting of seaweed, whose invention is credited to Yves Colin in 1961. The device consists of an iron hook attached to a hydraulic arm. It superseded a common harvesting tool known as the guillotine shortly after its invention. The scoubidou is used primarily for harvesting Laminaria digitata, a species used mainly for fertiliser.
