= The Perfume of the Lady in Black =

1974 film by Francesco Barilli

- Theatrical release poster
- Italian: Il profumo della signora in nero
- Directed by: Francesco Barilli
- Screenplay by: Francesco Barilli; Massimo D'Avack
- Story by: Francesco Barilli; Massimo D'Avack
- Produced by: Giovanni Bertolucci
- Starring: Mimsy Farmer; Maurizio Bonuglia; Mario Scaccia; Orazio Orlando
- Cinematography: Mario Masini
- Edited by: Enzo Micarelli
- Music by: Nicola Piovani
- Production company: Euro International Films
- Distributed by: Euro International Films
- Release date: 29 March 1974 (Italy)
- Running time: 104 minutes
- Country: Italy
- Language: Italian
- Box office: ₤582,674,000

The Perfume of the Lady in Black (Italian: Il profumo della signora in nero) is a 1974 Italian giallo film directed and co-written by Francesco Barilli in his feature directorial debut, and starring Mimsy Farmer, Maurizio Bonuglia, Mario Scaccia, and Orazio Orlando. The film is about Silvia (Farmer), an industrial scientist who is troubled by hallucinatory visions related to her younger self and her mother's suicide, and begins to lose her grasp on reality.

The film shares its title with the 1908 novel by Gaston Leroux, though the two are unrelated in plot or theme. The Perfume of the Lady in Black was released in Italy on 29 March 1974 by Euro International Films.

== Plot ==
Silvia Hacherman is a successful manager at a chemical laboratory in Rome. Accompanied by her boyfriend Roberto, she visits some Afro-Italian friends including Andy, a university professor, who explains that witchcraft, black magic and human sacrifice are all commonplace in Africa. He also reveals that in his country, there are still cults that target unknowing victims who are driven insane and ultimately killed. Silvia soon begins to experience a series of hallucinations and repressed memories, such as visions of her mother, Marta, sitting in a chair and putting on perfume in a black dress, as well as Marta being raped by a man that is not Silvia's father, who went into the Navy and died at sea. Marta died by apparently jumping off a balcony when Silvia was younger.

Intermixed with these visions are a series of strange events that seem to indicate Silvia's inability to determine what is real: a vase from Silvia's past appearing in her apartment after vanishing from a local antique shop, a bouquet of flowers dying suddenly and a mysterious little girl, representing a younger Silvia. Gradually, it becomes evident that everyone around Silvia seems to be conspiring together. This includes Roberto, Andy and the doorman, who all are seen driving off together one night. Long gazes from neighbours, co-workers and store clerks all seem to fuel this paranoia.

As Silvia's visions and hallucinations become more frequent, her neighbour and close friend Francesca invites her to a séance, which is also attended by Andy and Mr. Rossetti, another neighbour. There, Silvia reluctantly consults a blind psychic named Orchidea who, tapping into Silvia's troubled past, sees her father drowning at sea and Silvia pushing her mother off the balcony. Orchidea also warns Silvia that her stepfather, who attempted to molest Silvia, will pursue her relentlessly. After a frantic Silvia storms off, Andy, Francesca and Orchidea are all revealed to be part of a cult, as they convene in an abandoned tunnel and put on blue lab coats, before disappearing into the tunnel.

Silvia continues to be confronted by visions of her young self, who appears in her apartment and disappears when she brings over Mr. Rossetti. The next day, Francesca is mysteriously found dead in her bathtub. After attending the funeral, Silvia comes home and finds that Francesca's cremated remains have been left in her apartment. She then hallucinates pushing Marta off a balcony. The next day, after a neighbour stops by searching for her missing cat, Silvia finds Marta's black dress in her bedroom, before her younger self walks in to give her a box containing the neighbour's dead cat. While trying to get the cat taxidermied, Silvia encounters her stepfather Nicola, who wonders why she wrote down their old address. Frightened, she flees to her old house. Nicola follows her there, corners her and begins to rape her. Silvia strikes him in the head with a concrete block and flees, leaving him on the floor to die. That night, Silvia brings Roberto to see Nicola's body, but it is gone.

Silvia's hallucinations increase as her younger self convinces her that everyone else is evil and begins to command her to do things while wearing Marta's black dress. Silvia breaks into Mr. Rossetti's apartment and brutally murders him with a meat cleaver. Roberto comes over and Silvia also stabs him. She then arranges Roberto's body with those of Mr. Rossetti and Nicola around a dining table in a mock-up tea party. She follows her younger self to the roof, where the girl grabs her and they both fall off the roof. On the pavement below, only the dead body of the adult Silvia is found.

Silvia's naked corpse is laid out on a table in a dark chamber in the same abandoned tunnel system seen earlier. A large group of cultists dressed in blue lab coats—including Roberto, Nicola and Mr. Rossetti, who are all alive—surrounds Silvia's body. After Roberto cuts her body open, each cultist begins to grab organs from the body and immediately devours it. The cultists then disappear into the recesses of the tunnels, leaving Silvia's corpse behind.

== Cast ==
- Mimsy Farmer as Silvia Hacherman
  - Lara Wendel (credited as Daniela Barnes) as young Silvia Hacherman
- Maurizio Bonuglia as Roberto
- Mario Scaccia as Rossetti
- Jho Jenkins as Andy
- Niké Arrighi as Orchidea
- Aleka Paizi (credited as Alexandra Paizi) as Ms. Cardini
- Renata Zamengo as Marta Hacherman, Silvia's late mother
- Ugo Carboni as Luigi, the doorman
- Roberta Cadringher as the Antique dealer
- Carla Mancini as Elisabetta
- Donna Jordan as Francesca
- Orazio Orlando as Nicola
- Margherita Horowitz as Ms. Lovati (uncredited)
- Aldo Valletti as a cult member (uncredited)

== Release ==
The Perfume of the Lady in Black was released theatrically in Italy on 29 March 1974 by Euro International Film. On its domestic release, it grossed a total of 582,674,000 Italian lire.

== See also ==
- List of Italian films of 1974
