= Scoubidou (song) =

French song, translated from the American "Apples, Peaches and Cherries"

Song by Sacha Distel
- Recorded: 1958
- Songwriter(s): Abel Meeropol (original English poem)
- Composer(s): Abel Meeropol

"Scoubidou" is the title of a French song, translated from the American "Apples, Peaches and Cherries" composed by Abel Meeropol which was a hit when recorded by Peggy Lee in the United States. The song was originally written and recorded in English.

The French version was sung by Sacha Distel, and it was his first hit song, becoming number one in France. Abel Meeropol filed a copyright infringement suit against Distel, as originally he did not arrange for payment of royalties to the songwriter. After the suit was settled, royalties from the French version of the song continued to provide income to Michael and Robert Meeropol, the adopted sons of Meeropol and his wife Anne. The boys were the orphaned sons of Julius and Ethel Rosenberg, Americans who were convicted and executed for treason as spies for the Soviet Union.

The Distel lyrics that correspond to the English title are "des pommes, des poires, et des Scoubidous", or "apples, pears, and scoubidous". Coined for the song, the term scoubidou was soon applied to a form of knotted handicraft.
