= La commare secca =

1962 film

- Directed by: Bernardo Bertolucci
- Screenplay by: Bernardo Bertolucci; Sergio Citti; Pier Paolo Pasolini
- Based on: La commare secca by Pier Paolo Pasolini
- Produced by: Antonio Cervi
- Starring: Marisa Solinas; Allen Midgette; Giancarlo De Rosa; Alfredo Leggi
- Cinematography: Giovanni Narzisi
- Edited by: Nino Baragli
- Music by: Piero Piccioni; Carlo Rustichelli
- Release date: 19 September 1962
- Running time: 88 minutes
- Country: Italy
- Language: Italian

La commare secca (literally "The skinny godmother", English title The Grim Reaper) is a 1962 Italian film written and directed by Bernardo Bertolucci, based on a short story by Pier Paolo Pasolini. It was Bertolucci's directorial debut at age 21.

== Plot ==
The story is very similar to Akira Kurosawa's influential Rashomon, though in an interview Bertolucci denied having seen that film at the time. The film begins with the brutal image of a prostitute's corpse on the bank of the Tiber in Rome. We then see a series of interrogations of suspects by the police, all of whom are known to have been in a nearby park at the time of the murder. Each suspect recounts his activities during the day and evening, and each narrative serves as a slice of life story. A young man tells the police that he was meeting with priests in order to get a job recommendation, though we see that he and his friends spent the time trying to rob lovers in the park. A gigolo treats both his girlfriends badly. A soldier fails in his attempts at picking up a number of women and falls asleep on a park bench. Two teenage boys share a pleasant afternoon in the company of two teenage girls but end up stealing from a homosexual man in the park.

The final flashback depicts the prostitute's murder by a man in clogs who had been interrogated previously and who is finally apprehended at a dance. Each narrative is interrupted by a sudden thunderstorm, which in each case leads to an interlude at the prostitute's apartment as she prepares for her evening.

== Cast ==
- Francesco Ruiu as Canticchia
- Giancarlo De Rosa as Nino
- Vincenzo Ciccora as Mayor
- Alfredo Leggi as Bostelli
- Gabriella Giorgelli as Esperia
- Santina Lisio as Esperia's mother
- Carlotta Barilli as Serenella
- Ada Peragostini as Maria
- Clorinda Celani as Soraya
- Allen Midgette as Teodoro Cosentino
- Renato Troiani as Natalino
- Marisa Solinas as Bruna
- Alvaro D'Ercole as Francolicchio

== Critical reception ==
'Segnalazioni cinematografiche' found the film's ambition to adapt the work to "the most Pasolinian atmosphere and context of the marginal Rome' led to a "rather modest result". Critic John Simon called La commare secca "pure trash".

Janet Maslin, in her retrospective review for The New York Times, states that the film "has enough rough edges to mark it unmistakably as a debut effort. It also has a sophistication that, from so young and inexperienced a film maker, is quite unexpected. Mr. Bertolucci gravitates instinctively to extremes here, shooting from the steepest, the broadest, the most eye-catching angle whenever he can. Even when these touches don't serve the narrative, that hardly matters. The narrative is always secondary to Mr. Bertolucci's very disciplined flamboyance."

On the review aggregator website Rotten Tomatoes, 86% of 7 critics' reviews are positive.
