= Scoubidou =

Knotted handicraft

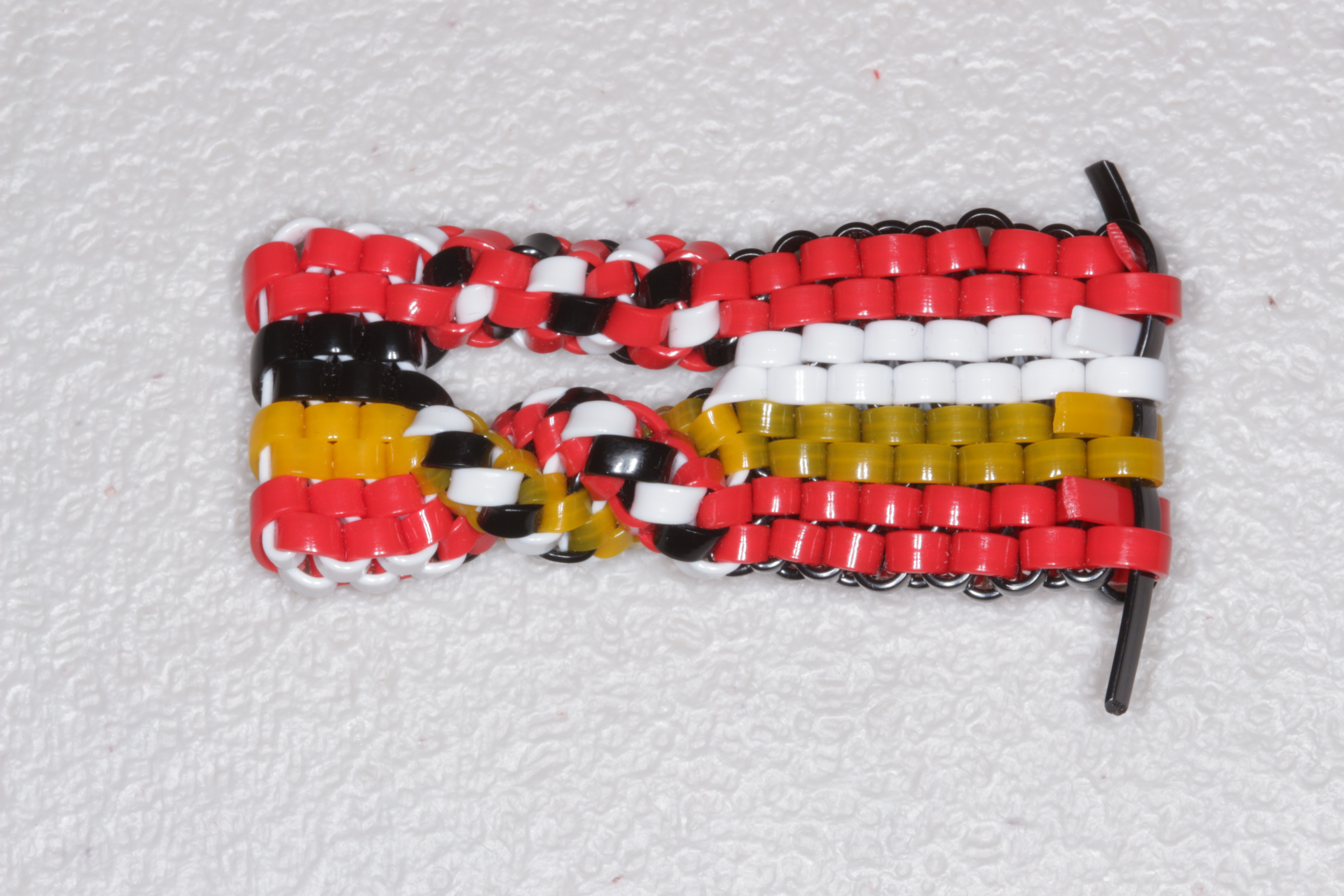
A fairly complex box stitch is shown here. Beginning at the left, it begins with quadruple box for 5 stitches, and then splits into single barrel (top) and double barrel (bottom) thus incorporating a window. After 11 stitches, the two independent barrels rejoin for another 13 stitches until the end (right).

Scoubidou (Craftlace, scoobies, lanyard, gimp, or boondoggle) is material used in knotting craft. It originated in France, where it became a fad in the late 1950s. It is named after the 1958 song of the same name as sung by the French singer Sacha Distel.

Scoubidou returned to fashion in various countries in the 1980s, and later in 2004 and 2005. It uses commercially supplied plastic strips or tubes.

== Thread ==
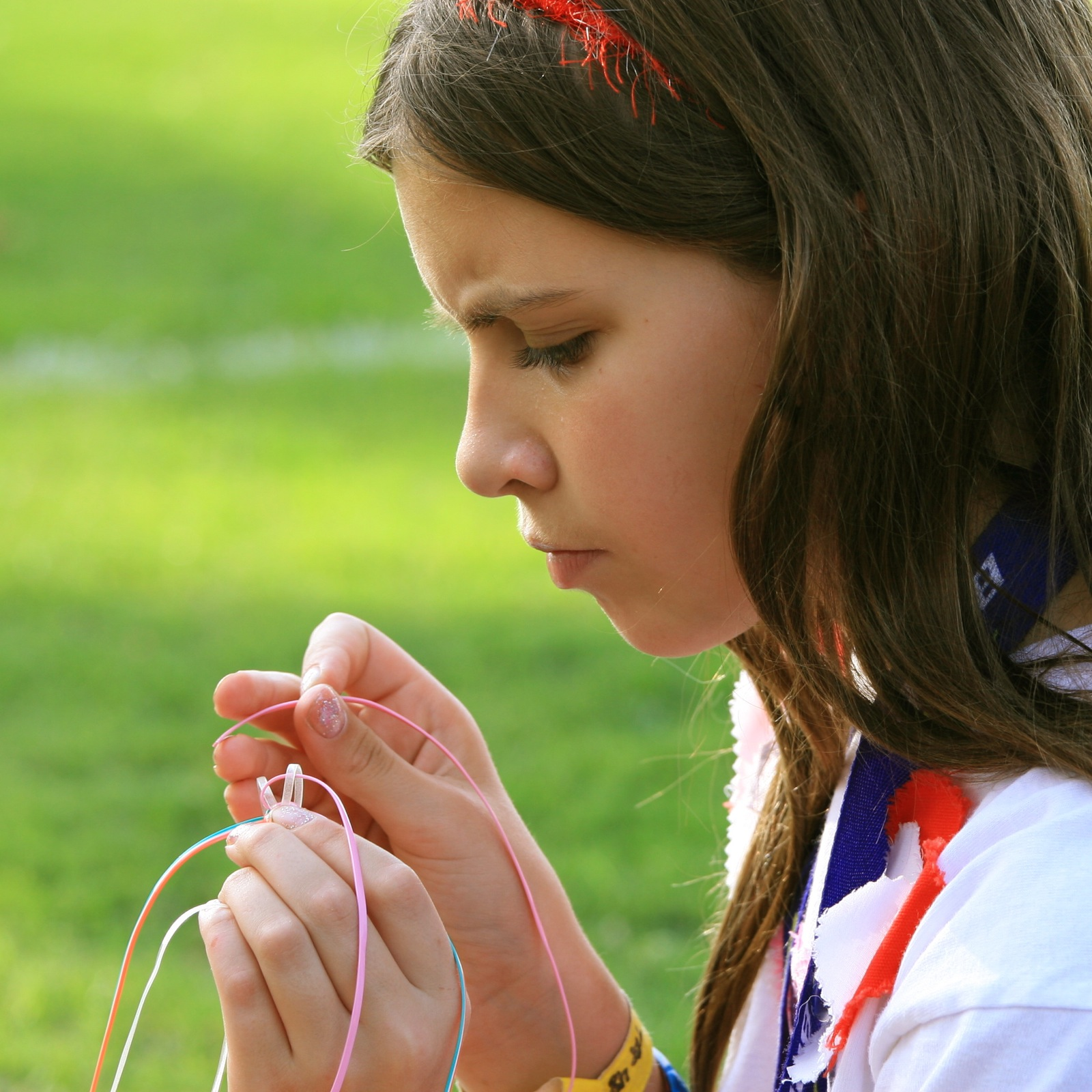
Stitching the thin thread requires concentration.

The most common kind of thread used for the craft is flat and comes in many colors, sometimes called "lanyard" or "gimp thread", often depending on region. Another kind of scoubidou thread is supple, round, and hollow plasticized PVC tubes usually about 80 centimetres in length. They are sold in various colors, sizes, and types, and are used to make items by binding them together with knots. On account of their elasticity and hollow cross-section—which enables them to collapse and deform when pulled—they form tight and stable knots. Key chains, friendship bands and other trinkets are most commonly woven, although more complicated shapes and figures can also be created.

Most of the knots used in scoubidou were already used in bast fibre, while the creations possible with scoubidou are similar to traditional corn dollies and macrame.

== Knots ==
=== Square stitch ===
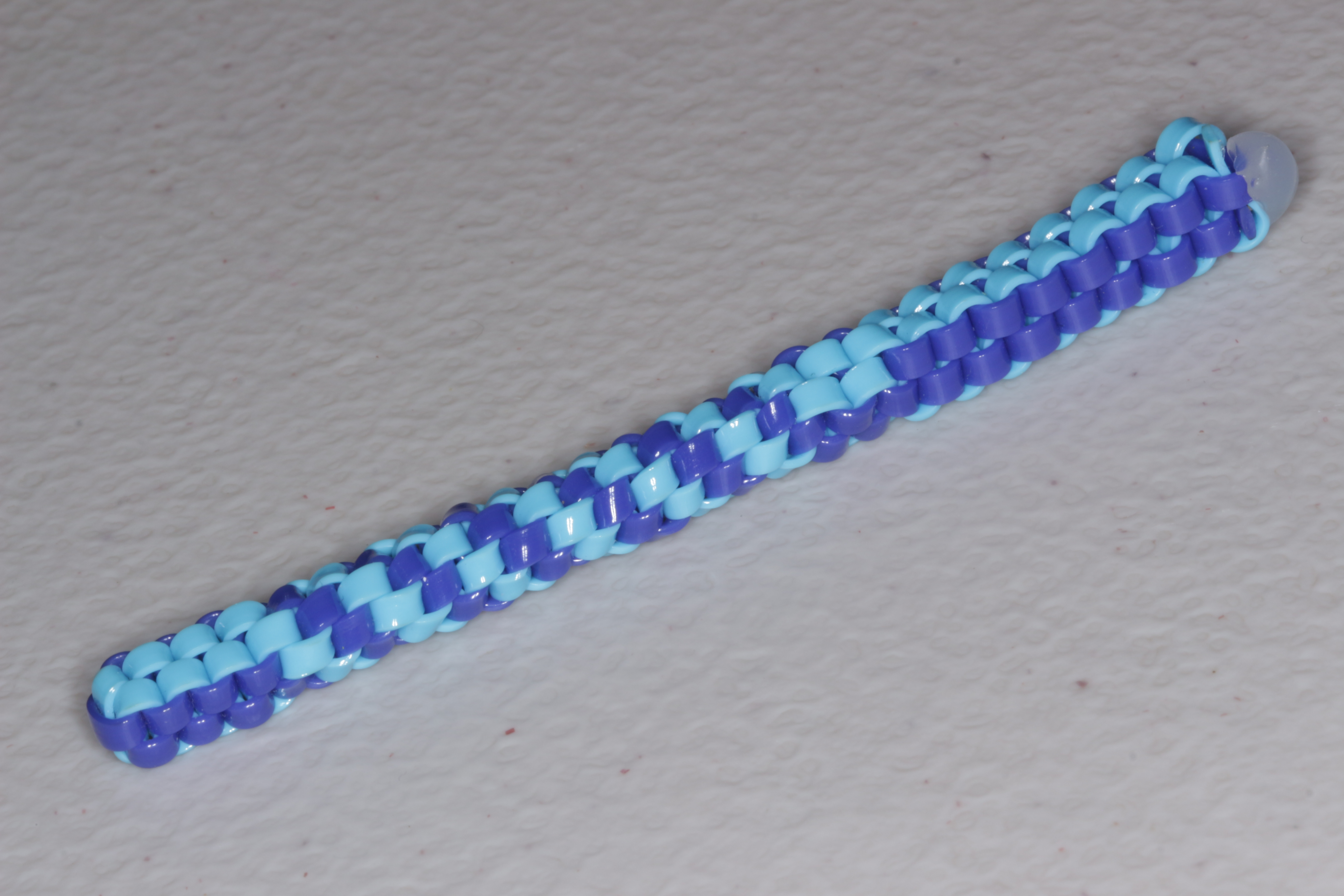
Single square stitch light and dark blue. This particular example starts in box, switches to barrel, and then returns to box.

Also known as a box stitch, the square stitch is the most common knot used in making keychains. It uses two strands of gimp. The square stitch is made by taking the end and crossing opposite ends, then taking one of the other ends and going over the first string and going under the second string. To finish, the last end is woven over the first strand and under the second strand.

More complex stitches can be made by using more strands and incorporating them adjacent to one another while sharing the same cross strand. Thus, one can have double, triple, quadruple and more, with the number of boxes being n-1, with n being the number of strands used (because one of the strands is used as the cross stitch). An endless variety of stitches can be made in this way, incorporating multiple rows, adding rows in the middle of the stitch, forming windows, switching to barrel, etc. Strands can also be added in perpendicular formation.

=== Barrel knot ===
By crossing the stitch, box can be made into a helical arrangement, often referred to as barrel or spiral, and the formed stitching becomes cylindrical as single barrel, but can take on quite interesting patterns when the stitch is a larger one, such as double, triple, or quadruple barrel.

=== Other numbers of strands ===
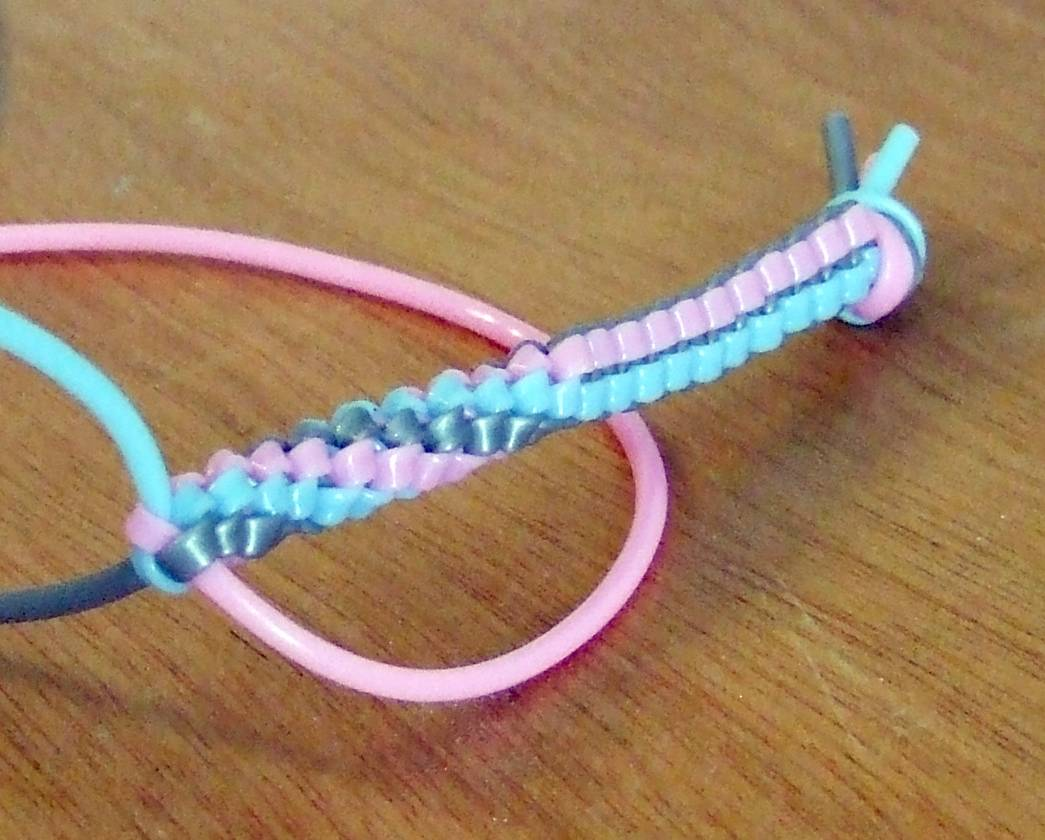
A three-strand scoubidou, with the first part done in a square knot and the second done in a spiral

A four-strand scoubidou, with three laces

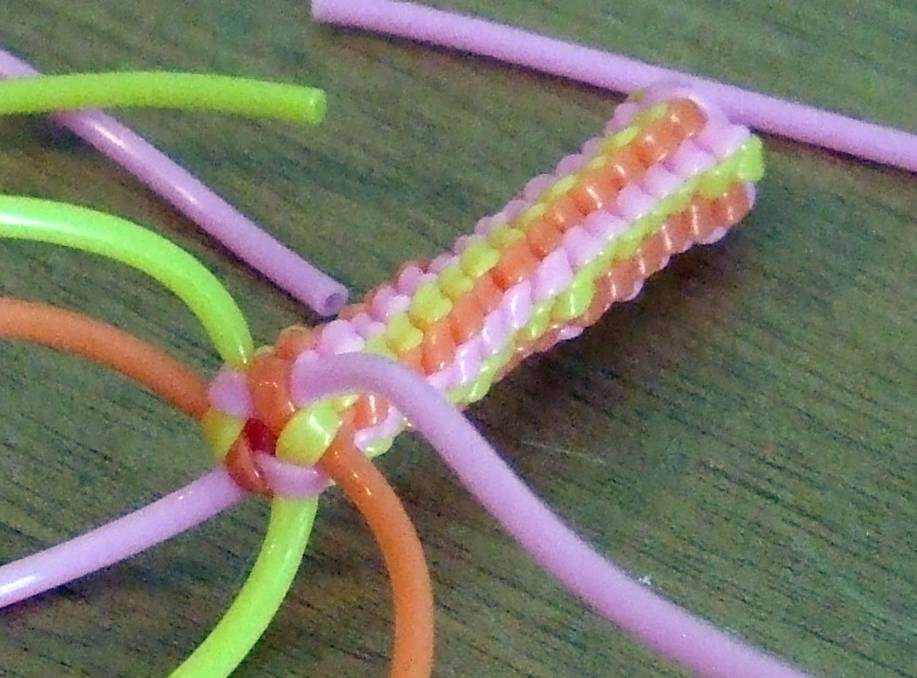
A six-strand scoubidou

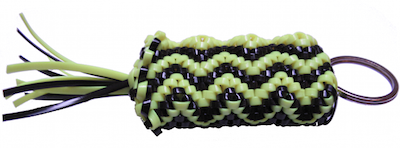
A ten-strand scoubidou

The square stitch uses four strands (resulting from the two ends of each of two scoubidous). Other numbers of strands may be used for the simple woven scoubidou chain, although with more than six the structure becomes difficult to support. Using even numbers of strands enables one end of the construction to be neatly terminated in the middle of a strand (as in the example of the square stitch).

As with the square stitch, each layer may be constructed either with the same direction of weave (leading to a chiral spiral structure) or as a mirror image of the previous layer (leading to a more angular appearance).

=== Double spiral ===
The double spiral, or twist, is the same concept as the spiral knot however the number of strings is doubled.

=== Cobra twist ===
The cobra stitch (or snake) involves tying two strands around two other strands back and forth. A super cobra (or king cobra) is created when the strands are tied around the cobra itself, making it wider and larger.

=== The Chinese staircase ===
One strand is tied around one or more other strands. The more strands that are used in the middle the fatter the Chinese staircase is. This is made with different colour strings.

=== The butterfly stitch ===
One loop strand is put through another and the latter loop pulled. The loops are then twisted together to resemble a butterfly.

=== Large stitches ===
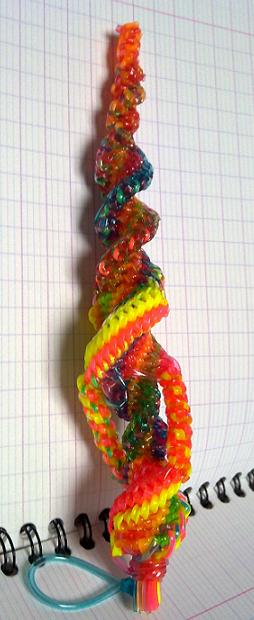
A sixteen-strand scoubidou

Many scoubidou stitches which are commonly done with small numbers of strands can be generalized to use any number of strands. The super-16 is a large scoubidou consisting of sixteen strands woven together. The super-16 can be compared to the square stitch but on a much larger scale.

== Making objects ==
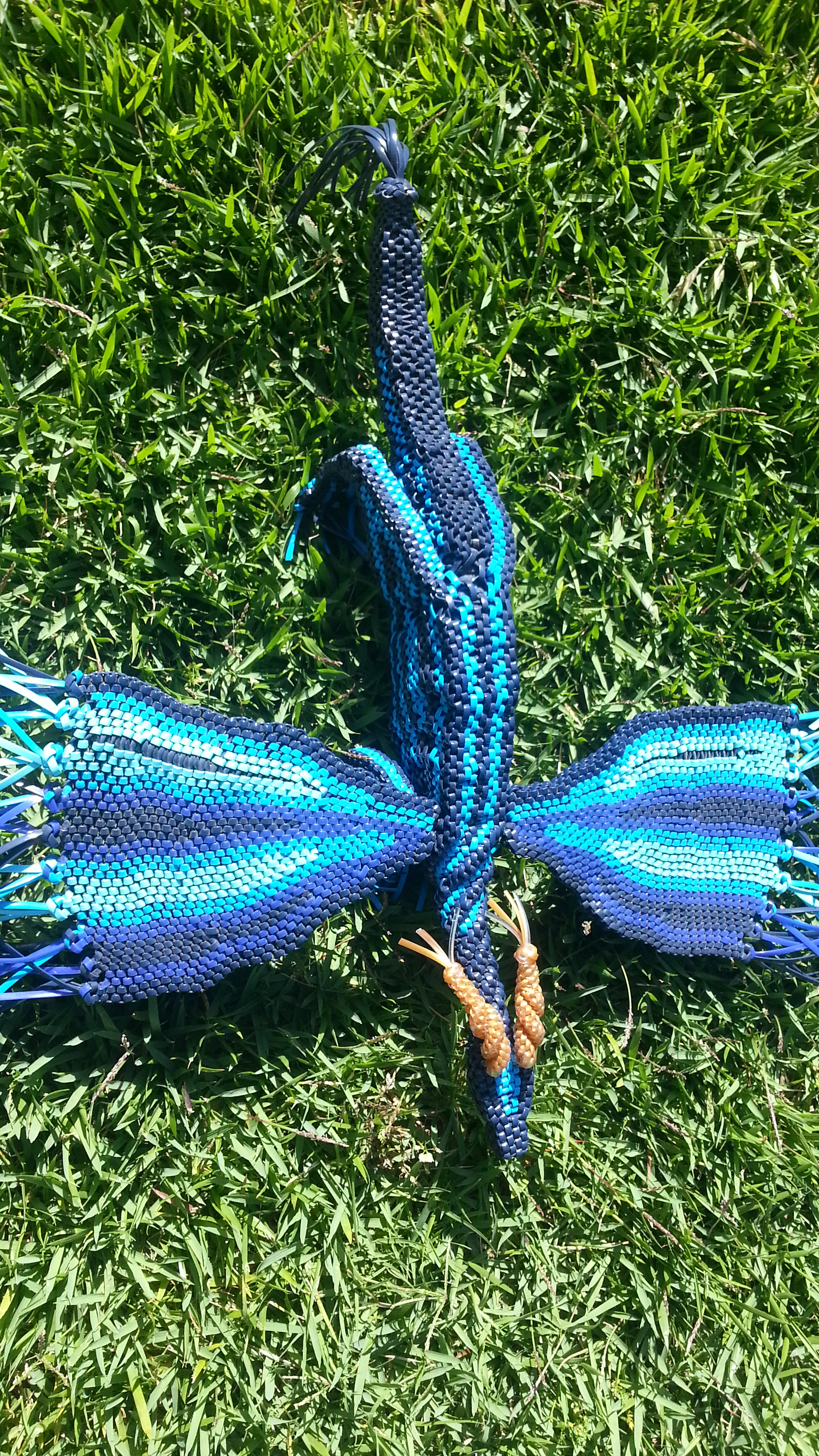
A dragon made with lanyard (scoubidou). More than 60 different strings were used to make it.

Creations such as dragons, Eiffel Towers, bridges, and birds can be made by putting wires inside the stitch to keep it stable, and to enable bending the stitch and keeping it bent.

== Gallery ==
Various knot types

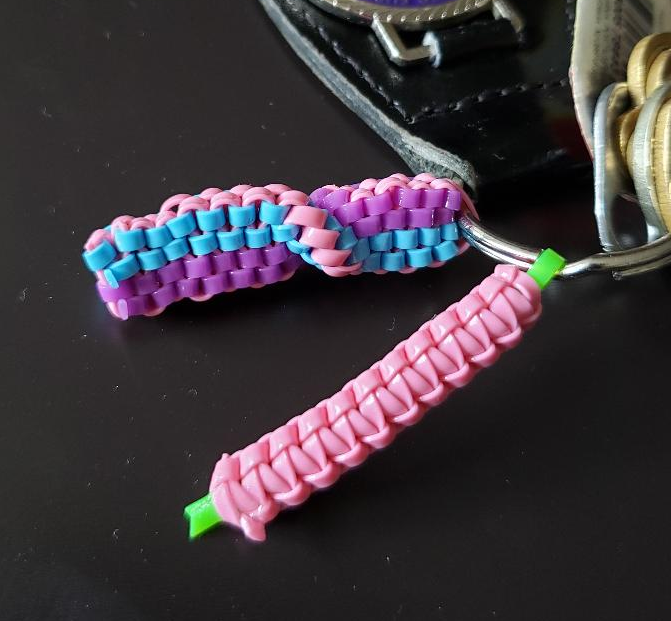
Cobra in the foreground, double box / double barrel in the rear

== See also ==
- Lucet
