= Milena Pavlović-Barili =

Serbian painter and poet (1909–1945)

Milena Pavlovic-Barili
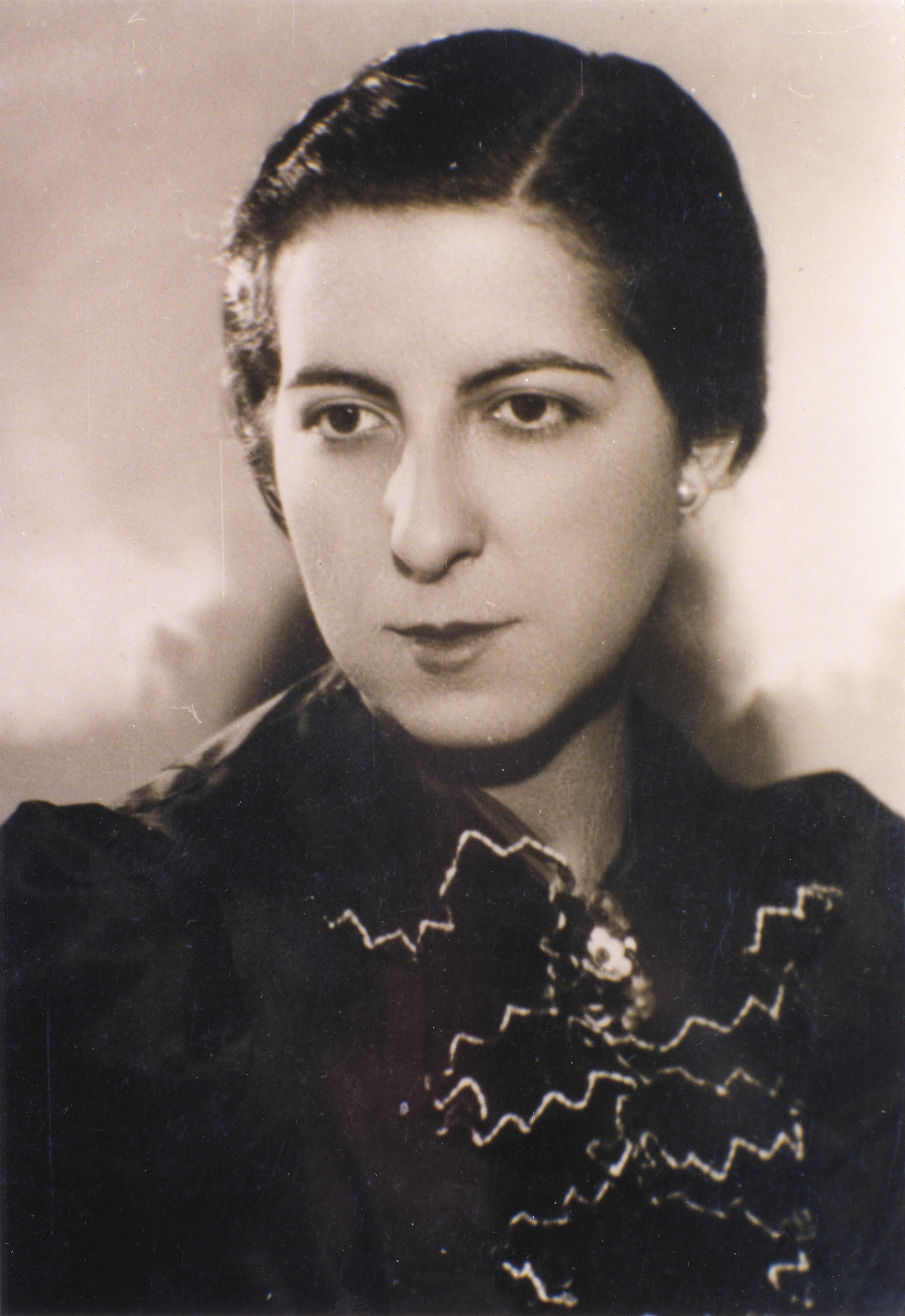
- Milena Pavlović-Barili (1936)
- Born: 5 November 1909; Požarevac, Serbia
- Died: 6 March 1945 (aged 35); New York City, U.S.
- Known for: Painting
- Spouse: Bruno Barilli (m. 1909)

Milena Pavlović-Barili (alt. Barilli; Serbian Cyrillic: Милена Павловић-Барили; 5 November 1909 – 6 March 1945) was a Serbian painter and poet. She is the most notable female artist of Serbian modernism.

== Biography ==
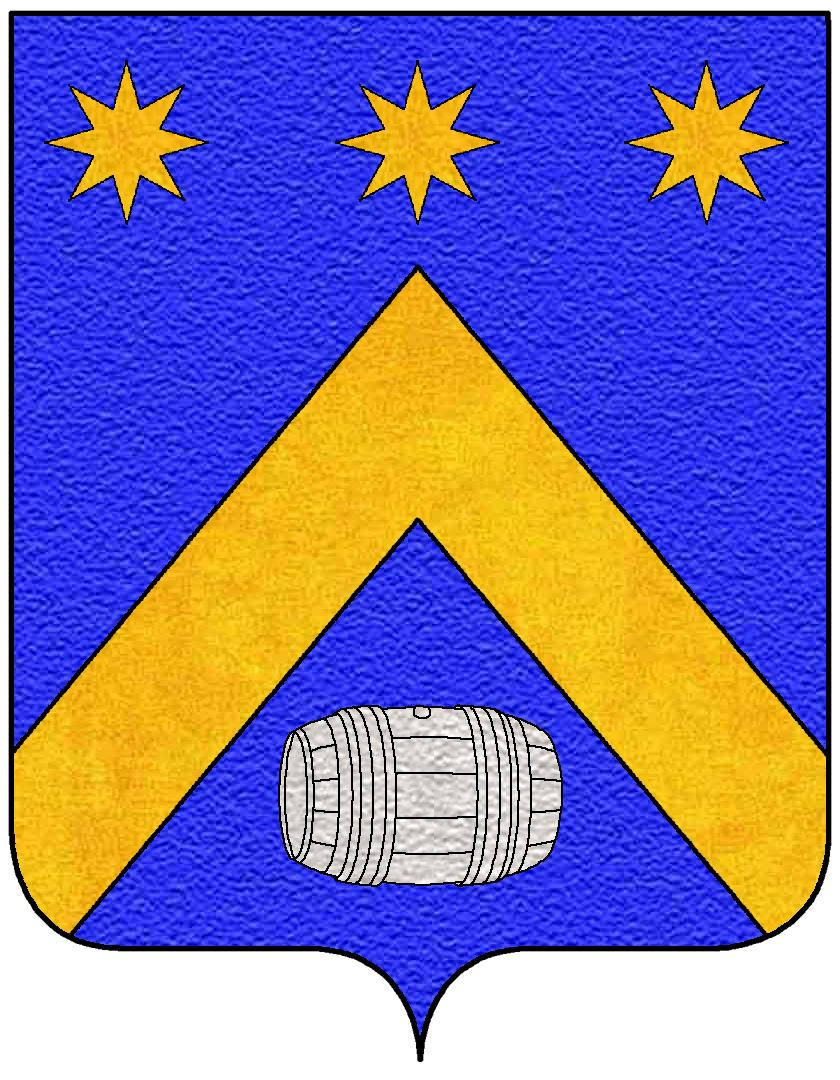
Coat of arms of the Barili family

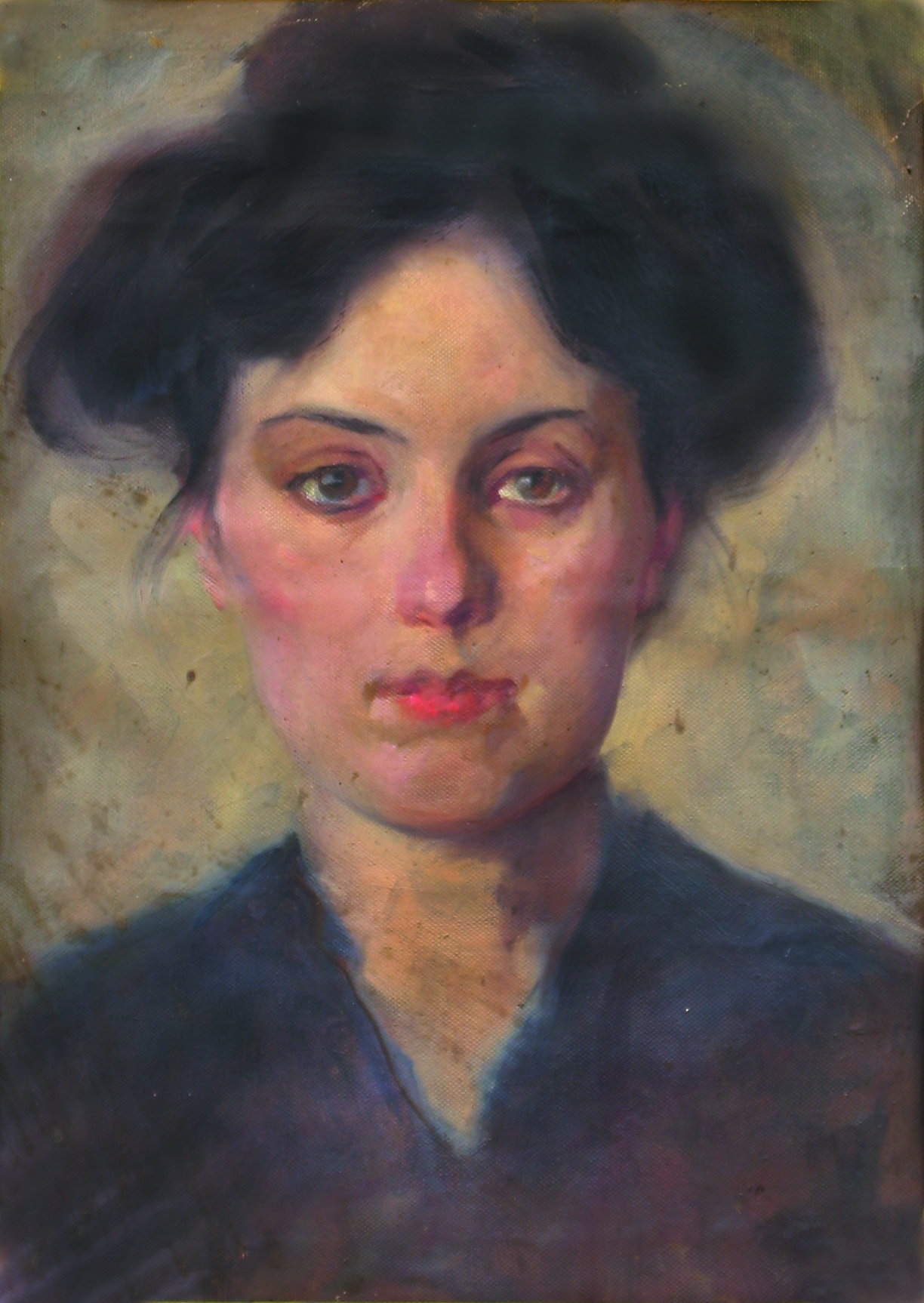
Danica Barili, painted by Cecrope Barilli

Her Italian father, Bruno Barilli, was an influential composer, elder son of Cecrope Barilli, director of the Parmesan Academy of Fine Arts and a member of a noted artistic Barilli family. Her paternal uncle was Latino Barilli, himself a prominent Italian painter. Milena's Serbian mother, Danica Pavlović-Barili (1883–1965), a descendant of Karađorđe Petrović, Serbian revolutionary leader and founder of the House of Karađorđević, ruling family of the Kingdom of Serbia and later Kingdom of Yugoslavia, has served as lady in waiting to Queen Maria of Yugoslavia and was tasked with improving her Serbian language. She was also appointed as superintendent at the court of King Alexander I of Yugoslavia, who was her second cousin once removed. Danica also had artistic talent and studied art in Munich, where she met her husband, Bruno Barilli in 1905, an Italian actor and music composer, whom she married in an Orthodox ceremony 4 years later in the city of Požarevac.

Milena studied at the Royal School of Arts in Belgrade, Kingdom of Yugoslavia (1922–1926) and in Munich (1926–1928). In the early 1930s, she left Serbia and returned only for brief visits until the outbreak of World War II. During her stays in Spain, Rome, Paris and London, where she socialised with Jean Cocteau and André Breton, she was influenced by many western schools and artists, notably Giorgio de Chirico. After 1939, she lived and worked in New York where her career peaked as an illustrator for Vogue, Harper's Bazaar, and other publications under the J. Walter Thompson advertising agency.

In 1941, she appeared in the Twentieth Annual of Advertising Art, and before her death, she was commissioned to design costumes for Gian Carlo Menotti's ballet Sebastian and a production of Shakespeare's A Midsummer Night's Dream; these were never completed. She died of a heart attack at the age of 35, having sustained serious injuries in a horse-riding accident the previous summer. She was cremated, according to her American husband's wishes, and buried in a cemetery in Rome.

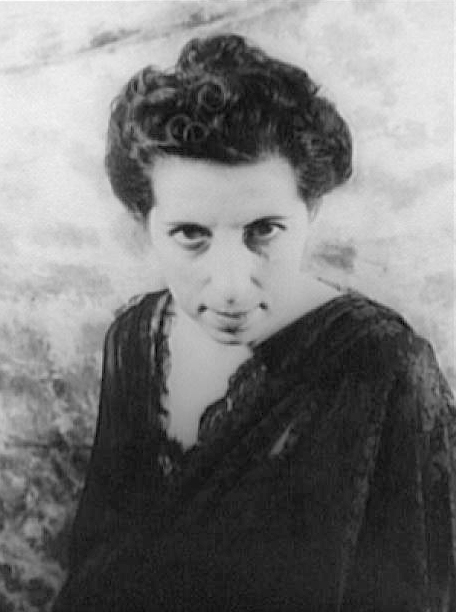
The picture of Milena Pavlovic-Barili taken by Carl von Vechten in 1940

The topics of her work varied from portraits to imaginative interpretations of biblical stories. The motifs often included dream-like situations, veils, angels, statues of Venus, and Harlequins. Many of her works are parts of permanent exhibitions in Rome, New York City, Museum of Contemporary Art (Belgrade), and her hometown of Požarevac, where the house in which she was born has been converted into a museum in her honor. In 1943, Pavlović-Barili's work was included in Peggy Guggenheim's show Exhibition by 31 Women at the Art of This Century gallery in New York.

== Legacy ==
She was born in Požarevac. The house in which she was born is now a museum, the Milena Pavlović-Barili Gallery, dedicated to her life. The house was donated to the town of Požarevac by Milena's mother Danica Pavlović-Barili in 1961, and opened for public in 1962. The gallery holds 894 works of art by Milena Pavlović Barilli (136 oils, 51 pastels, 415 drawings, 286 tempera and watercolors, 6 prints), 72 works from the collection of the Biennale and contemporary authors, 9 works from the family art collection, which is a total of 975 works.

=== Artworks about Milena and her work ===
Performance

- Milena ZeVu, ‘Milena’ homage to the Serbian artist Milena Pavlovic Barilli (1909-1945), House of Jevrem Grujic, March 2019, Belgrade, Serbia

== Gallery ==
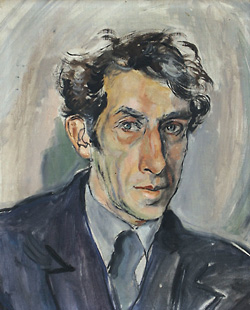
Portrait of Milena's father, Bruno Barili (1938)

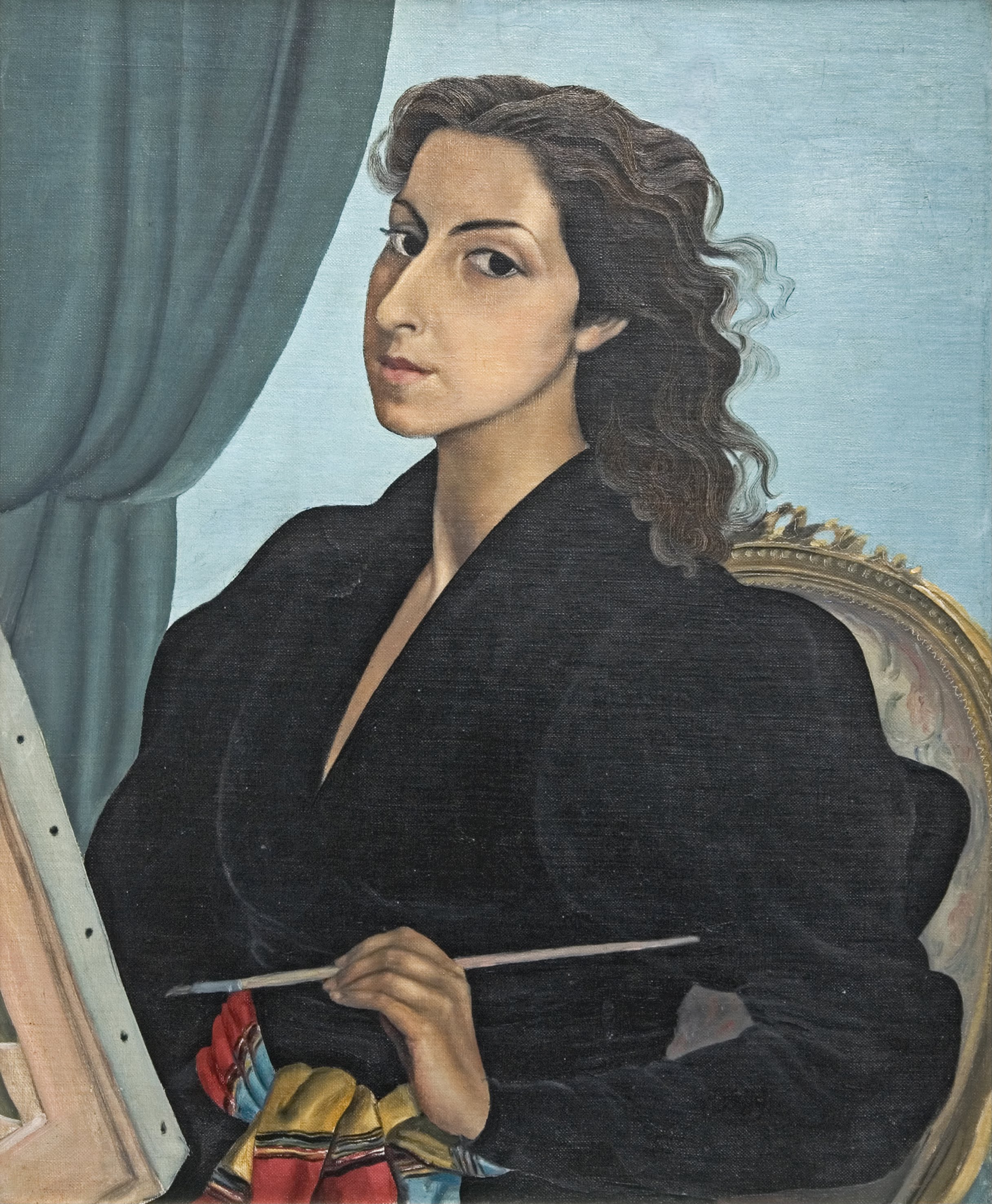
Self-portrait, 1938

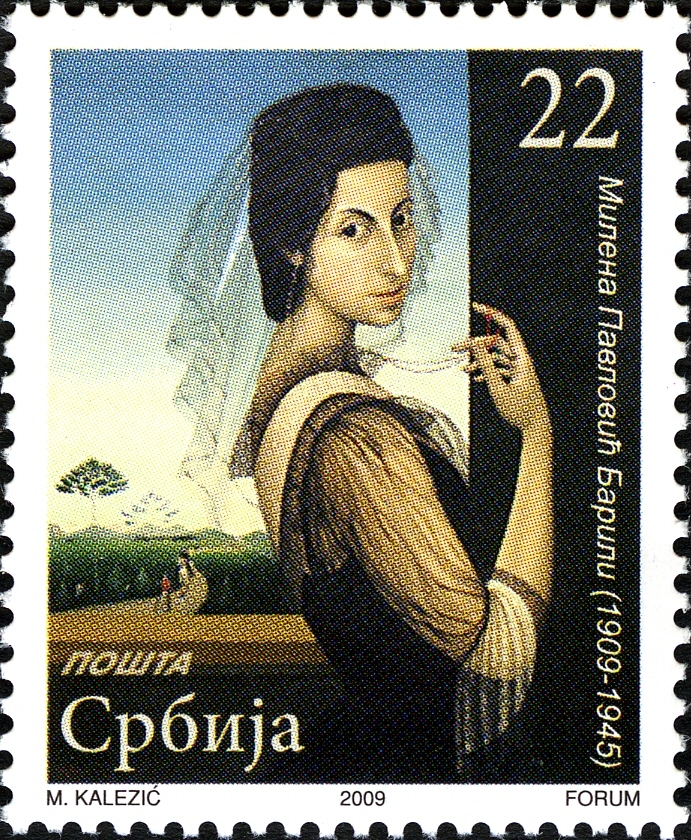
Self-portrait, 1939

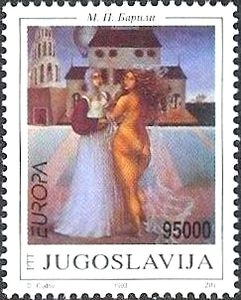
Nude with mirror

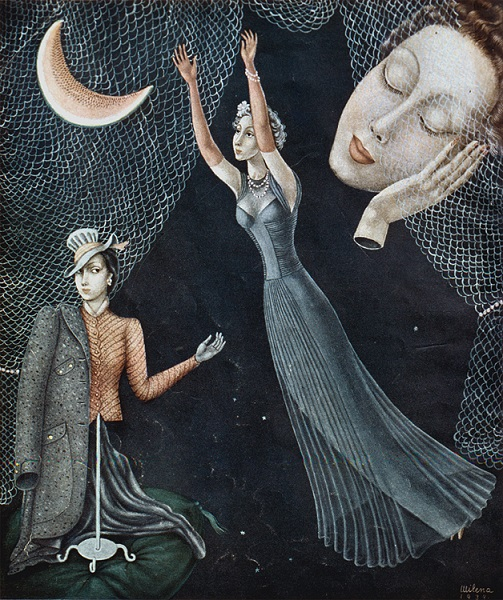
Hot Pink with Cool Grey, 1940

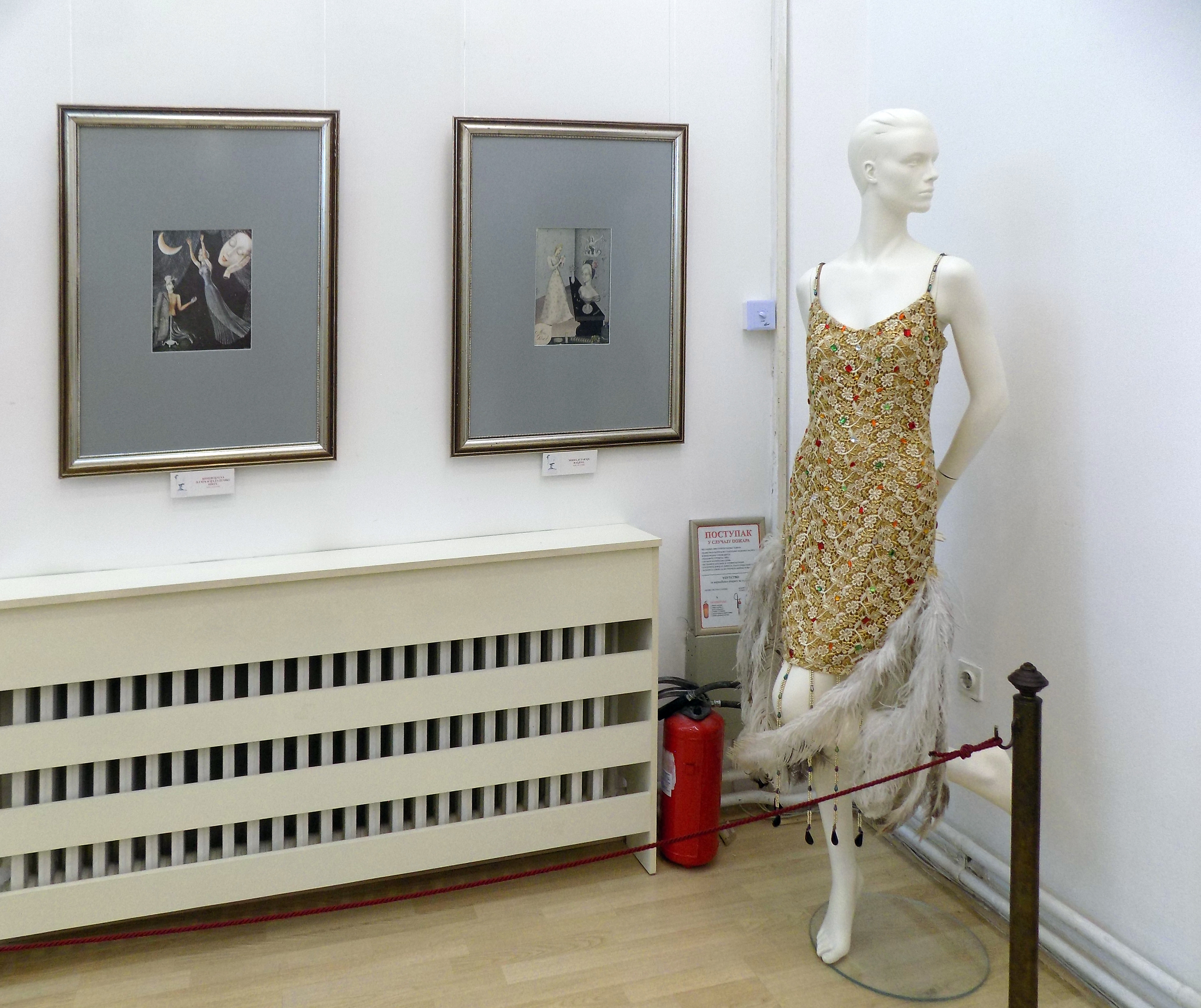
Front pages of "Vogue" magazine and one of the dresses that Milena created

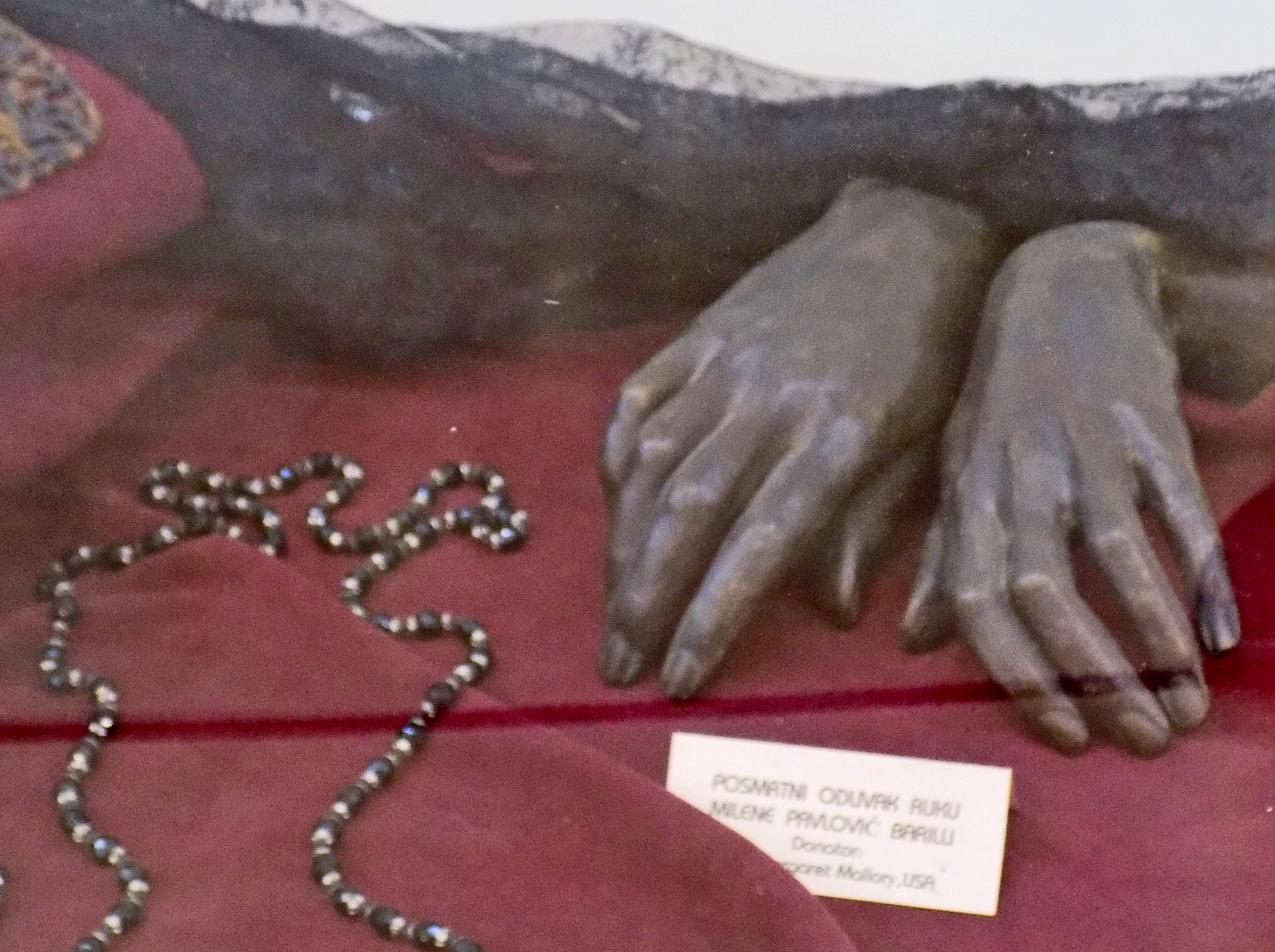
Posthumous casting of Milena's hands

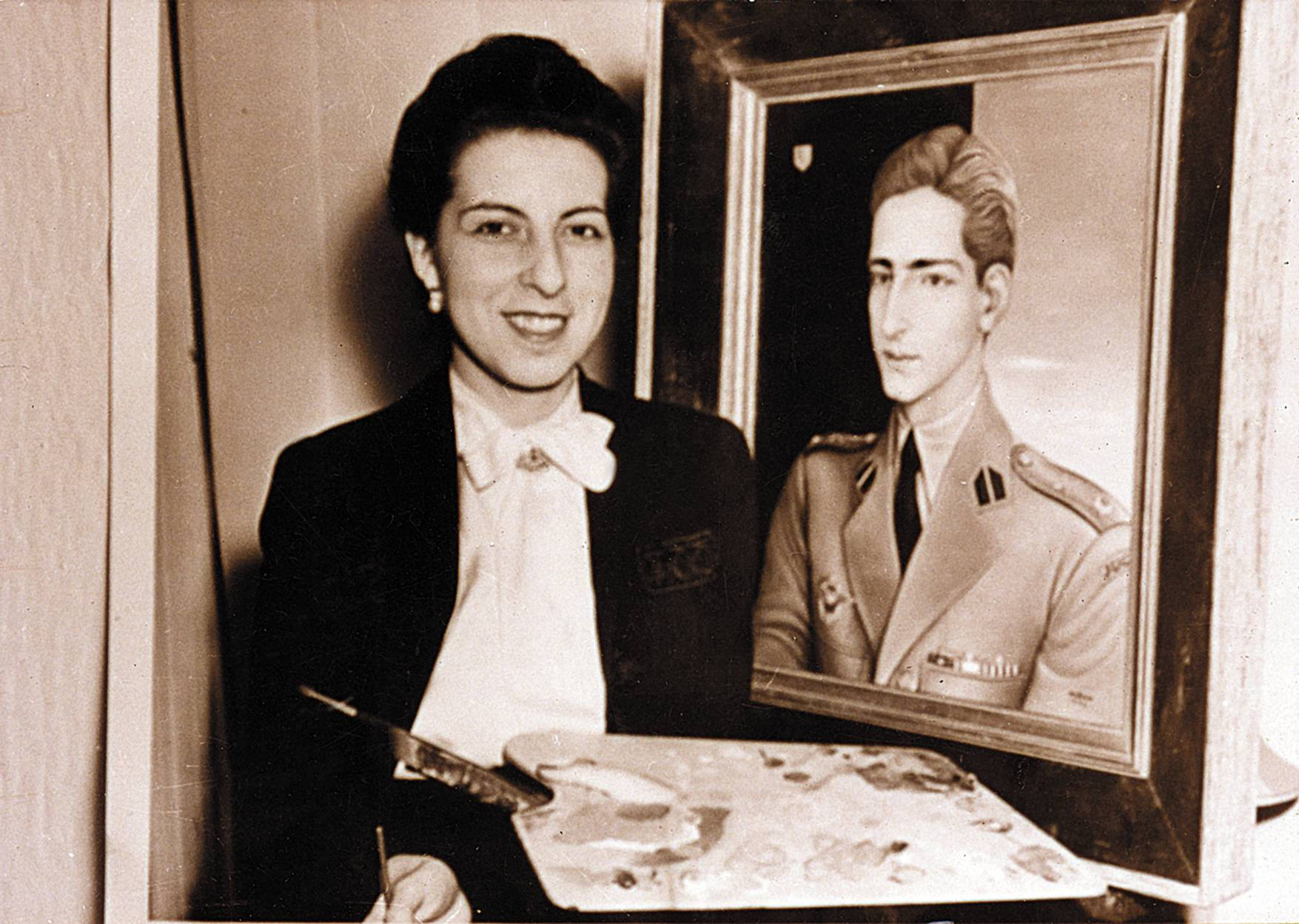
Milena with the portrait of her relative King Peter II, New York (1942)

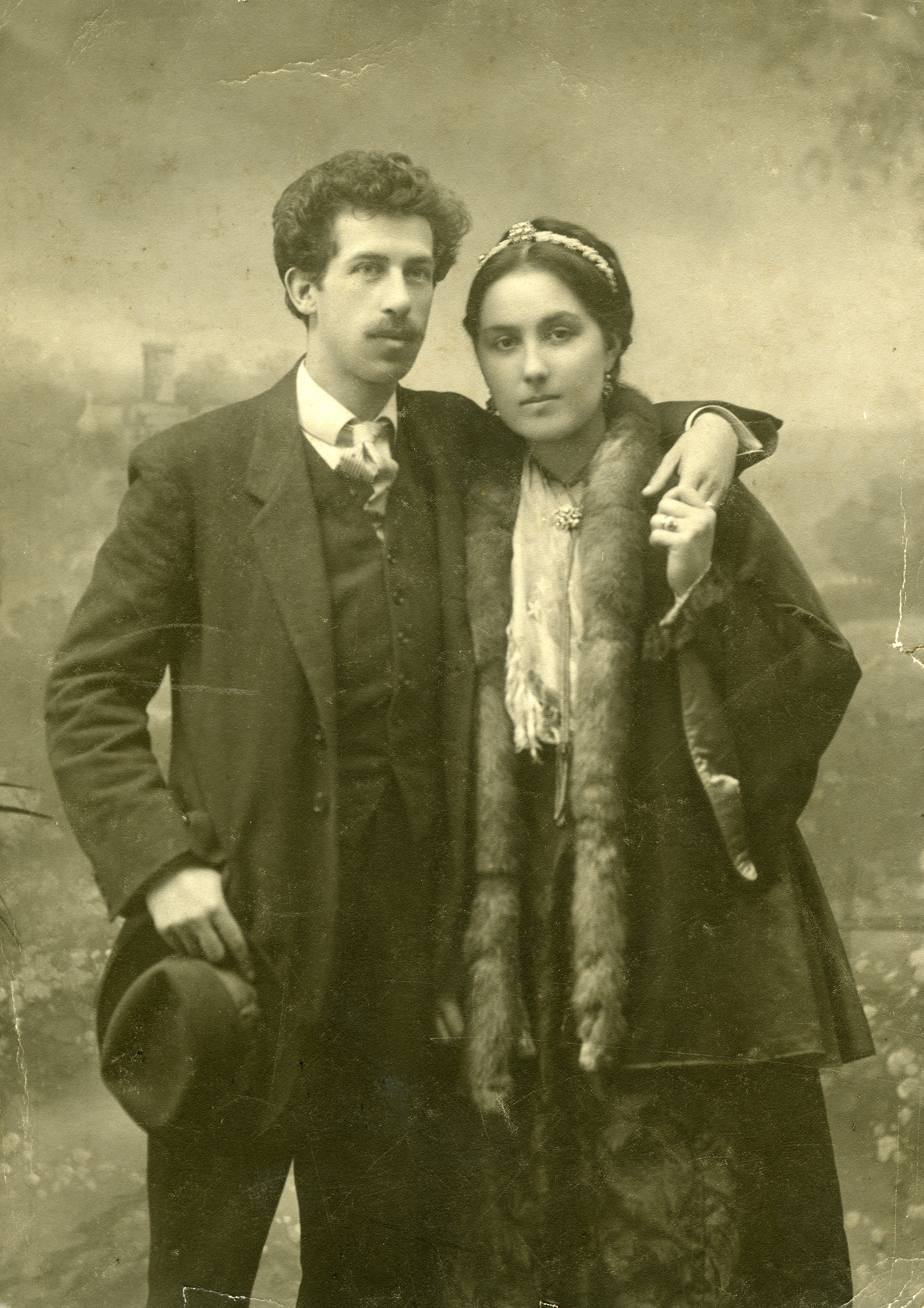
Milena's parents Bruno and Danica

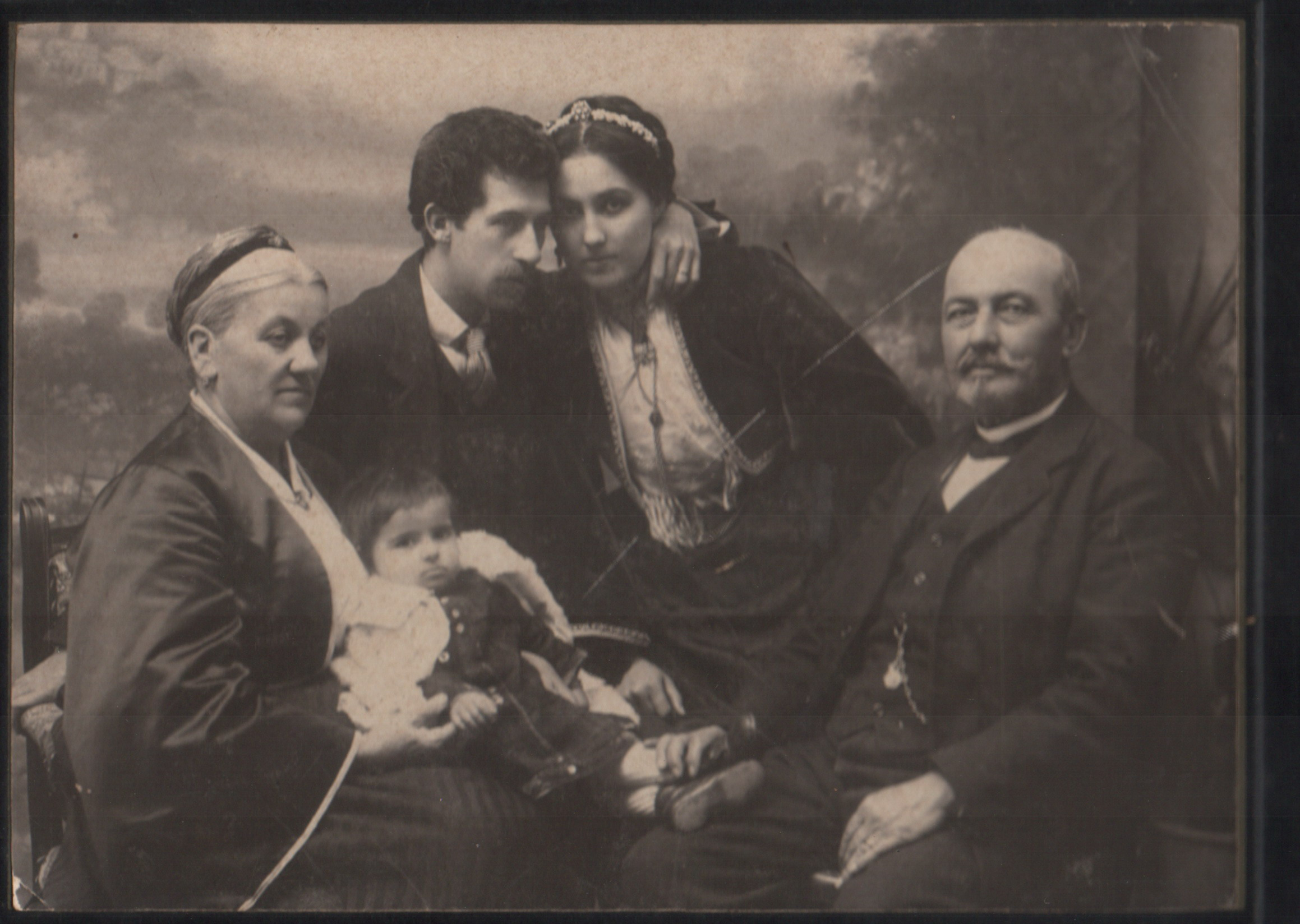
Milena as a child with her parents and maternal grandparents

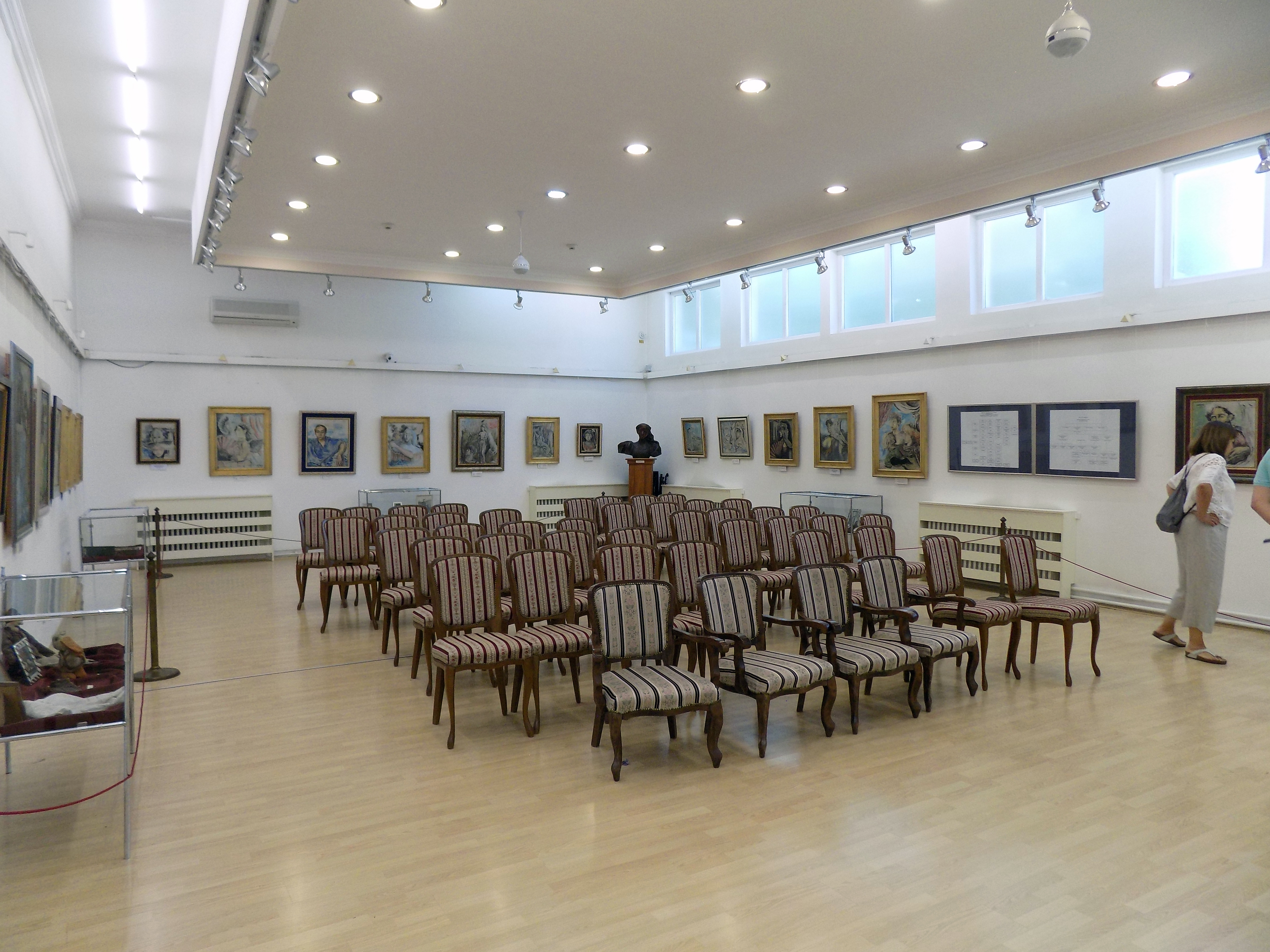
Pavlović-Barili Gallery in Požarevac

== See also ==
- List of painters from Serbia
- Serbian art
