= Cecrope Barilli =

Italian painter (1839–1911)

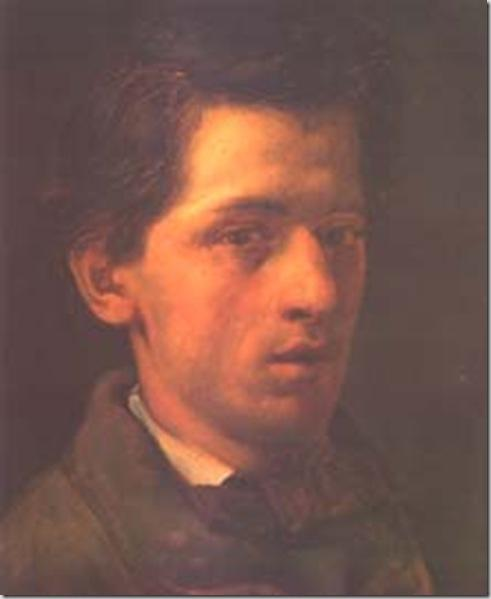
Self-portrait, painted (c. 1880)

Cecrope Barilli (Italian: [ˈtʃɛːkrope baˈrilli]; April 2, 1839 – June 23, 1911) was an Italian painter.

== Biography ==
Born in Parma, as a young man he joined the forces fighting for Italian independence at the Battle of Palestro. Afterwards he moved to Florence, where he was influenced by the Macchiaioli painters, then to Paris where he frequented the studio of Gustave Doré. In 1870, he returned to Italy.

He frescoed the prefecture and council hall of the Municipal Palace of Parma. In 1877, he painted the curtain for the Municipal Theater of Montecarotto. In 1889, he was nominated director of the Academy of Fine Arts of Parma, and the next year was elected municipal councillor of Parma. He exhibited a canvas of La Vendemmia at the 1883 Promotrice of Florence, and a La Ciociara at the 1885 exhibition of Turin. He died in Parma in 1911. His son Latino (1883–1961) was also a painter, while his other son Bruno (1880–1952) was an actor and music composer, father of Milena Pavlović-Barili, the most notable female artist of Serbian modernism.
