= Matteo Renzi =

Prime Minister of Italy from 2014 to 2016

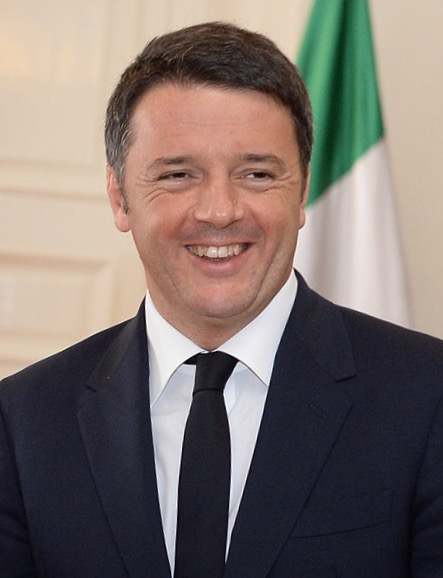
- Renzi in 2015

Prime Minister of Italy
- In office 22 February 2014 – 12 December 2016
- President: Giorgio Napolitano; Sergio Mattarella
- Preceded by: Enrico Letta
- Succeeded by: Paolo Gentiloni

President of Italia Viva (Note: Renzi already acted as de facto leader since 18 September 2019)
- Incumbent
- Assumed office 23 December 2022
- Preceded by: Position established

Secretary of the Democratic Party
- In office 7 May 2017 – 12 March 2018
- Deputy: Maurizio Martina
- Preceded by: Matteo Orfini
- Succeeded by: Maurizio Martina
- In office 15 December 2013 – 19 February 2017
- Deputy: Lorenzo Guerini; Debora Serracchiani
- Preceded by: Guglielmo Epifani
- Succeeded by: Matteo Orfini

Member of the Senate of the Republic
- Incumbent
- Assumed office 23 March 2018
- Constituency: Florence (2018–22); Campania (2022–)

Mayor of Florence
- In office 22 June 2009 – 24 March 2014
- Preceded by: Leonardo Domenici
- Succeeded by: Dario Nardella

President of the Province of Florence
- In office 14 June 2004 – 22 June 2009
- Preceded by: Michele Gesualdi
- Succeeded by: Andrea Barducci

Personal details
- Born: 11 January 1975 (age 51) Florence, Italy
- Party: PPI (1996–2002); DL (2002–2007); PD (2007–2019); IV (since 2019)
- Spouse: Agnese Landini (m. 1999)
- Children: 3
- Education: University of Florence
- Website: matteorenzi.it
- Renzi's voice Renzi accepting defeat following the 2016 Italian constitutional referendum Recorded 5 December 2016

Matteo Renzi (pronounced [matˈtɛːo ˈrɛntsi]; born 11 January 1975) is an Italian politician who served as prime minister of Italy from 2014 to 2016. He has been a senator for Florence since 2018. Renzi has served as the leader of Italia Viva (IV) since 2019, having been the secretary of the Democratic Party (PD) from 2013 to 2018, with a brief interruption in 2017.

After serving as the president of the province of Florence from 2004 to 2009 and the mayor of Florence from 2009 to 2014, Renzi was elected secretary of the PD in 2013, becoming prime minister the following year. At the age of 39 years, Renzi, who was at the time the youngest leader in the G7 and also the first-serving mayor to become prime minister, became the youngest person to have served as prime minister. While in power, Renzi's government implemented numerous reforms, including changes to the Italian electoral law, a relaxation of labour and employment laws with the intention of boosting economic growth, a thorough reformation of the public administration, the simplification of civil trials, the introduction of same-sex civil unions, and the abolition of many small taxes.

After the rejection of his constitutional reform in the 2016 Italian constitutional referendum, Renzi formally resigned as prime minister on 12 December; his Foreign Minister Paolo Gentiloni was appointed his replacement. He resigned as secretary of the PD following defeat in the 2018 Italian general election. In September 2019, he left the PD and founded the Italia Viva party. In January 2021, Renzi revoked his party's support to the Conte II Cabinet headed by Prime Minister Giuseppe Conte, which brought down the government and resulted in the 2021 Italian government crisis. In February 2021, Renzi's IV supported Prime Minister Mario Draghi's national unity government. Renzi has been described as a centrist and as a liberal by political observers.

== Early life ==
Renzi was born on 11 January 1975 in Florence, the second of four children. His father Tiziano Renzi was a small business owner and Christian Democracy (DC) municipal councillor in Rignano sull'Arno. Renzi grew up in an observant Catholic family in Rignano sull'Arno. He studied in Florence at the classical lyceum (liceo classico) Dante Alighieri, where he passed his final exam with the grade of 60/60 but was nearly expelled because, as the students' representative, he refused to withdraw a school newspaper in which there was criticism of a maths teacher. During this time, he was a Scout in the Association of Catholic Guides and Scouts of Italy.

In 1999, Renzi graduated in law from the University of Florence with a thesis on Giorgio La Pira, the former DC mayor of Florence. He then went on to work for CHIL Srl, a marketing company focusing on leafleting owned by his family, co-ordinating the sales service of La Nazione. During this time, Renzi was also an association football referee at amateur level and a futsal player. In 1994, he participated as a competitor for five consecutive episodes in the television program La ruota della fortuna (a localised version of the United States game show Wheel of Fortune) hosted by Mike Bongiorno, winning Lit.48 million.

== Early political career ==
Renzi's interest in politics began in high school. He was one of the founders of the committee in support of Romano Prodi's candidature as Prime Minister of Italy in the 1996 Italian general election; that same year, Renzi joined the centrist Italian People's Party (PPI), and became its provincial secretary in 1999. He also married Agnese Landini, with whom he later had three children. In 2001, Renzi joined Francesco Rutelli's Daisy party, composed by members of the disbanded PPI.

On 13 June 2004, Renzi was elected president of the province of Florence with 59% of the vote, as the candidate of the centre-left coalition. He was the youngest person to become president of an Italian province. In the years as president of Florence province, Renzi expressed his ideas against "the political caste" and during his mandate reduced taxes and decreased the number of the province's employees and managers.

=== Mayor of Florence ===
After five years as the president of Florence province, Renzi announced that he would seek election as the mayor of Florence. On 9 June 2009, Renzi, by now a member of the Democratic Party (PD), won the election on a second round vote with 60% of the votes, compared to 40% for his opponent Giovanni Galli. As the mayor, he halved the number of city councillors, installed 500 free WiFi access points across the city, reduced kindergarten waiting lists by 90%, and increased spending on social welfare programs and schools.

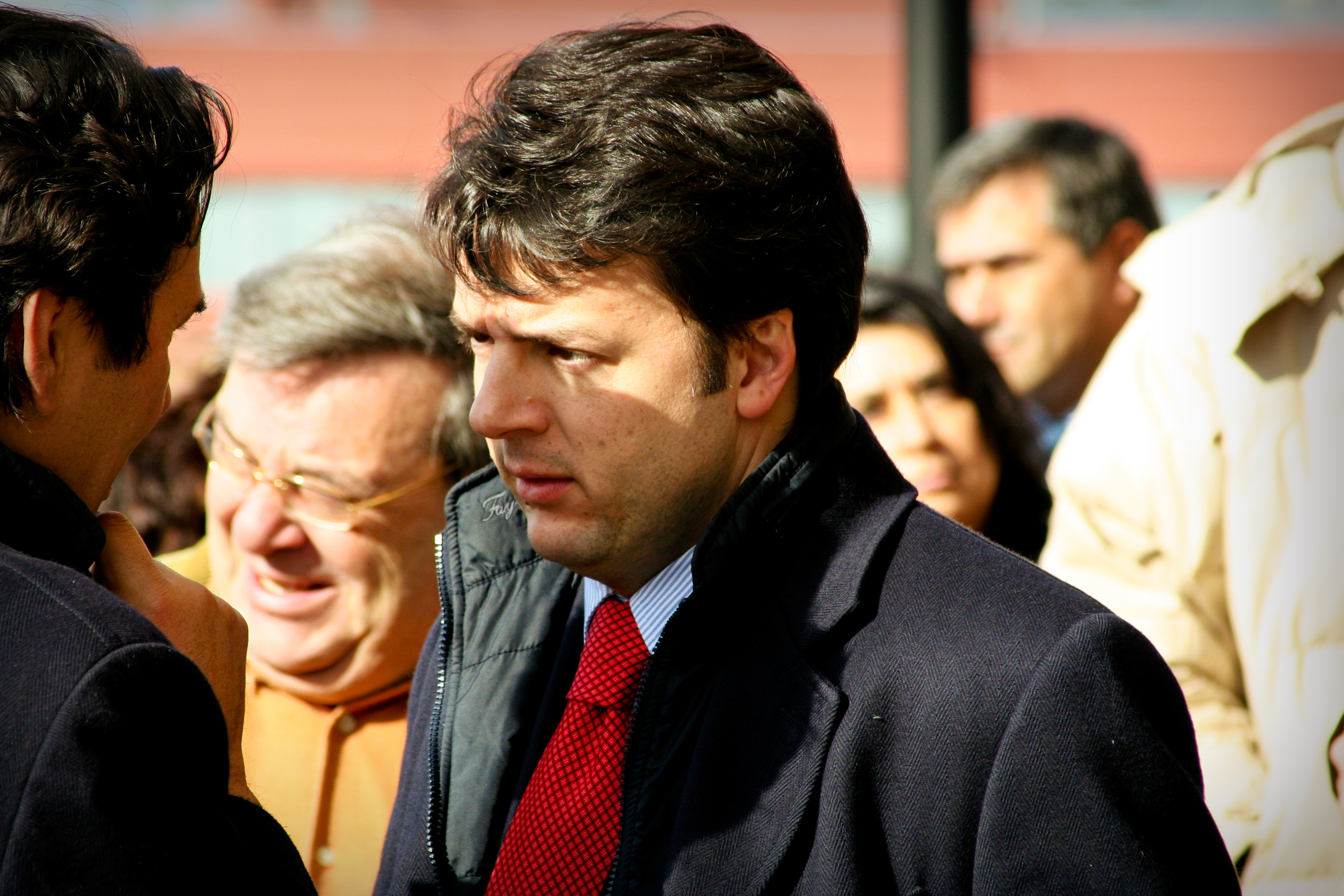
Renzi in 2009 as the mayor of Florence

One year after being sworn in as mayor and with his popularity in national opinion polls increasing, Renzi organised a public meeting with another young party administrator Debora Serracchiani at Leopolda Station in Florence to discuss Italian politics, after stating that a complete change was also necessary in his party. Other prominent PD members who aligned themselves with Renzi's programme were Matteo Richetti, president of the Regional Council of Emilia-Romagna, Davide Faraone, a regional councillor from the Sicilian Regional Assembly, and Giuseppe Civati, a prominent member of the PD in Lombardy and a member of the Regional Council of Lombardy.

Following this public meeting in August 2010, the Italian media gave Renzi the nickname il rottamatore ("The Scrapper" or "The Wrecker"). In October 2011, Renzi organised a second public meeting, also in Florence, where he wrote down one hundred topics of discussion. During this time, he began to be strongly criticised by other members of his party closer to then-PD secretary Pier Luigi Bersani, after his suggestion that Italian politicians of the same generation as then-Prime Minister Silvio Berlusconi should retire. In September 2012, Renzi announced that he would seek to lead the centre-left coalition in the 2013 Italian general election; the other four candidates for that position were Pier Luigi Bersani, the PD secretary, Nichi Vendola, leader of Left Ecology Freedom, Laura Puppato, a PD deputy from Veneto and Bruno Tabacci, leader of the Democratic Centre. His candidacy was criticised by some prominent PD members and to the party's left, among them Rosy Bindi, Massimo D'Alema, Stefano Fassina, and Vendola.

After the first round of the 2012 Italian centre-left primary election, Renzi gained 35.5% of the vote, finishing second behind Bersani and qualifying for the second ballot. Renzi eventually gained a total of 39% of the vote, against Bersani's 61%. During the 2013 general election campaign, Renzi backed Bersani by organising large public rallies in his support in Florence. In the election, the PD only gained 25.5% of the vote, despite opinion polls placing the party at almost 30%. In the 2013 Italian presidential election, Renzi caused a minor controversy by openly criticising the candidacies of both Franco Marini and Anna Finocchiaro, two long-standing PD members.

=== Secretary of the Democratic Party ===
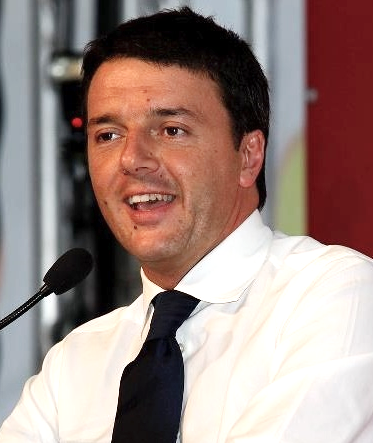
Renzi in 2012

Following the resignation of Pier Luigi Bersani in April 2013, Renzi announced that he would stand for the position of secretary of the Democratic Party (PD), causing his rivals to scrutinize him. The PD's loss of seats led to party members' doubts concerning Bersani's leadership abilities. Renzi's impressive resume at such a young age, in combination with his reputation as a political outsider thanks to his "Scrapper" moniker, made him very electable in comparison. He was supported by a number of his former political opponents, such as former party secretaries Walter Veltroni and Dario Franceschini, deputy Marina Sereni, member of the European Parliament David Sassoli, and Turin mayor Piero Fassino. Other supporters of his included deputies like Gianni Pietro Dal Moro, Francesco Sanna, Francesco Boccia, Lorenzo Basso, and Enrico Borghi, all of whom were considered close to the newly elected Prime Minister Enrico Letta.

The other two candidates for party secretary were Gianni Cuperlo, a member of the Chamber of Deputies and former secretary of the Italian Communist Youth Federation, and Giuseppe Civati, a left-wing-oriented deputy from Lombardy and a former supporter of Renzi. In the 2013 PD leadership election, Renzi was elected with 68% of the popular vote, compared to 18% for Cuperlo and 14% for Civati. He became the new PD secretary and the centre-left coalition's prospective candidate for Prime Minister of Italy. When comparing it with the 2012 centre-left primary election, Renzi moved to the left and his electorate was not much different from that of the party's average primary.

Renzi's victory was welcomed by Prime Minister Letta, who had been the vice-secretary of the party under Bersani's leadership. Throughout January and February 2014, there were multiple reports of persistent leadership tensions between Renzi and Prime Minister Letta. Many said that Renzi was pressuring Letta to resign in his favour, arguing that he should be given the right to become prime minister, as he was the PD's leader. On 12 February, Letta acknowledged these rumours for the first time, publicly demanded that Renzi make his position clear. Renzi subsequently called a meeting of the PD leadership for the following evening. Just before the meeting took place, Renzi publicly called on Letta to resign and allow him to form a new government. Letta initially resisted the demand; following a vote in favour of Renzi's proposal during the meeting, which Letta did not attend, he announced that he would tender his resignation as prime minister on 14 February.

Under Renzi's leadership, the PD officially joined the Party of European Socialists (PES) as a full-time member on 28 February 2014.

== Prime Minister of Italy (2014–2016) ==
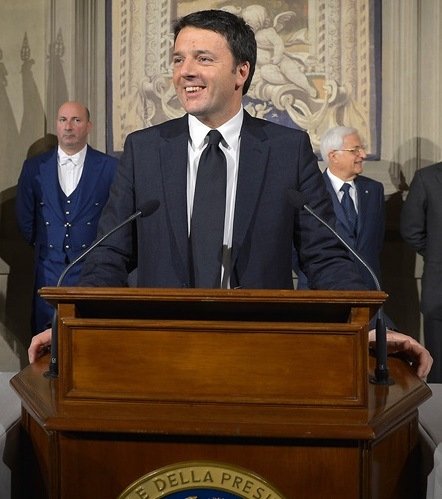
Renzi announcing the formation of the Renzi Cabinet

On 17 January 2014, while on air at Le invasioni barbariche on La7 TV channel, interviewed about the tensions between him and the Prime Minister Enrico Letta, Renzi tweeted #enricostaisereno ("Enrico don't worry") to reassure his party colleague that he was not plotting anything against him. At a meeting on 13 February, the PD leadership voted heavily in favour of Renzi's call for "a new government, a new phase and a radical programme of reform". Minutes after the party backed the Renzi proposal by 136 votes to 16, with two abstentions, Palazzo Chigi, the official residence of the Prime Minister, announced that Letta would travel to the Quirinale the following day to tender his resignation to President Giorgio Napolitano. On 17 February, in his last act as the mayor of Florence, Renzi appointed Dario Nardella as Deputy Mayor Regent of Florence with the task of leading the city until the mayoral elections in May that same year.

In an earlier speech, Renzi had paid tribute to Letta, saying that he did not intend to put him "on trial". Without directly proposing himself as the next prime minister, he said the eurozone's third-largest economy urgently needed "a new phase" and "radical programme" to push through badly needed reforms. The motion he put forward made clear "the necessity and urgency of opening a new phase with a new executive". Speaking privately to party leaders, Renzi said that Italy was "at a crossroads" and faced either holding fresh elections or a new government without a return to the polls. On 14 February, President Napolitano accepted Letta's resignation from the office of Prime Minister.

Following Letta's resignation, Renzi formally received the task of forming a new government from President Napolitano on 17 February. Renzi held several days of talks with party leaders, all of which he broadcast live on the internet, before unveiling the Renzi Cabinet on 21 February, which contained members of the PD, the New Centre-Right, the Union of the Centre, and the Civic Choice (SC). His cabinet became Italy's youngest government to date, with an average age of 47. It was also the first in which the number of female ministers was equal to the number of male ministers, excluding the Prime Minister.

On 22 February, Renzi was formally sworn in as prime minister, becoming the fourth prime minister in four years and the youngest prime minister in the history of Italy. His rise to become the PD's secretary and eventual prime minister was seen as a sign of much-needed generational change; at the time he took office, Renzi enjoyed by far the highest approval rating of any politician in the country. On 25 February, Renzi won a vote of confidence in the Italian Parliament, with 169 votes in the Senate of the Republic and 378 in the Chamber of Deputies.

On 7 February 2015, after just under a year in power, five senators and two deputies from the SC defected to the PD, citing the leadership of Renzi as Prime Minister as the primary reason for their decision to change parties. On 20 March, Prime Minister Renzi briefly became ad interim Minister of Infrastructure and Transport following the resignation of Maurizio Lupi due to a corruption scandal, involving public works on infrastructure, in which his name had been cited several times. Renzi held the office on an unofficial basis until 2 April, when Graziano Delrio was appointed as the new minister.

On 4 December 2016, after the failure of the referendum he proposed, Renzi announced his resignation. On 7 December, he officially handed over the resignation to the President Sergio Mattarella.

=== Domestic policy ===
==== Labour reform ====
Upon becoming prime minister, Renzi said that labour market reform, which was thought to be "long overdue", and was opposed by major trade unions and organised labour, to introduce labour market flexibility, would be at the top of his agenda to improve the state of the Italian economy. On 12 March 2014, the Renzi Cabinet issued a law-decree on fixed-term contracts, called the Poletti Decree, from the name of the Labour Minister Giuliano Poletti, as well as a bill proposing major reforms to the Italian labour market called the Jobs Act. A reduction in the tax burden of about €80 was announced for those earning less than €1,500 per month. On 30 April, Renzi and Marianna Madia, the Minister for the Public Administration, presented the guidelines for the reform of the public administration, which was approved by the Renzi Cabinet on 13 June, before becoming law on 7 August.

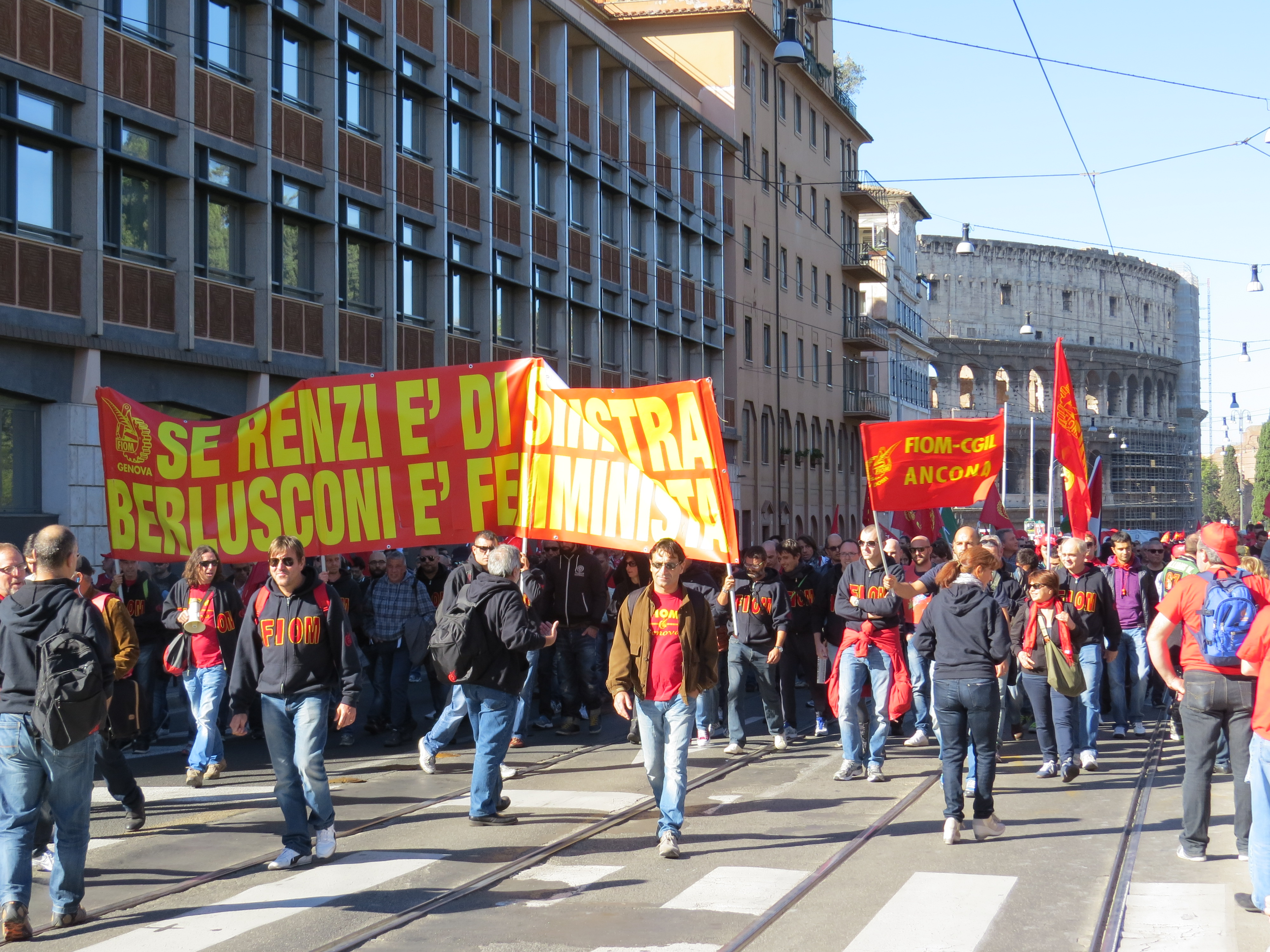
Trade union protesters demonstrate near the Colosseum against Renzi's labour market reforms.

In September 2014, the government sought approval for the Jobs Act, which provided for, among other things, the abolition of Article 18 of the Workers' Statute, which protected workers from unjustified dismissal. The proposal was criticised by organised labour, especially the largest trade union, the Italian General Confederation of Labour (CGIL), and its leaders Susanna Camusso and Maurizio Landini. Moreover, the left wing of the Democratic Party (PD), by then led by Renzi's rival and former PD secretary Pier Luigi Bersani, criticised the government for the reform, threatening to vote against it.

On 29 September, the National Committee of the PD voted to support the Jobs Act, despite the disagreements within the party, with 130 votes in favour, 20 against, and 11 abstaining. On 9 October, the Senate voted to approve the Jobs Act, and the landmark reform passed with 165 votes in favour to 111 against, marking the first step for the most ambitious economic legislation of the eight-month-old government. Before the vote, Labour Minister Poletti was forced to cut his speech short due to the loud protests of the Five Star Movement (M5S) and Lega Nord (Lega) oppositions, some of whom threw coins and papers. German chancellor Angela Merkel, who was visiting Milan and had been among the most vocal politicians regarding Italy's need for speedy economic reforms, said the labour law marked an "important step" to reduce "employment barriers" in the eurozone's third-largest economy.

On 25 October, almost one million people took part in a mass protest in Rome, organised by the CGIL in opposition to the labour reforms of the government. Some high-profile members of the left-wing faction of the PD, including Gianni Cuperlo, Stefano Fassina, and Giuseppe Civati, also participated in the protest. On 8 November, more than 100,000 public employees protested in Rome in a demonstration organised by the three largest trade unions in the country, the CGIL, the CISL, and the UIL. On 25 November, the Chamber of Deputies approved the Jobs Act with 316 votes; the M5S, Lega, and almost forty members of the PD abstained from the vote to protest against the reform. On 3 December, the Senate gave the final approval it needed to become law.

In January 2017, the Jobs Act was taken to the Constitutional Court of Italy; Renzi and his supporters said that the law was necessary for job creation and to attract investors, while its critics responded that it diminished workers' rights without generating new jobs. The court rejected a petition, which received 3.3. million signatures, for a referendum to be held about the Job Acts. In September 2018, the Jobs Acts was partially repealed after the same court declared the compensation rules for claims of unlawful dismissal to be unconstitutional, on the grounds that these rules were not in line with the principles of "reasonableness and equality" and conflicted with the concept of "protection of work" as granted by Articles 4 and 35. In July 2020, the court accepted the questions raised from the tribunals of Bari and Rome about the same matter, ruling the compensation rules to be in violation of the constitutional principles of equality, reasonableness, and job protection; it was the first time that a ruling was signed by three women.

==== Economic policies ====
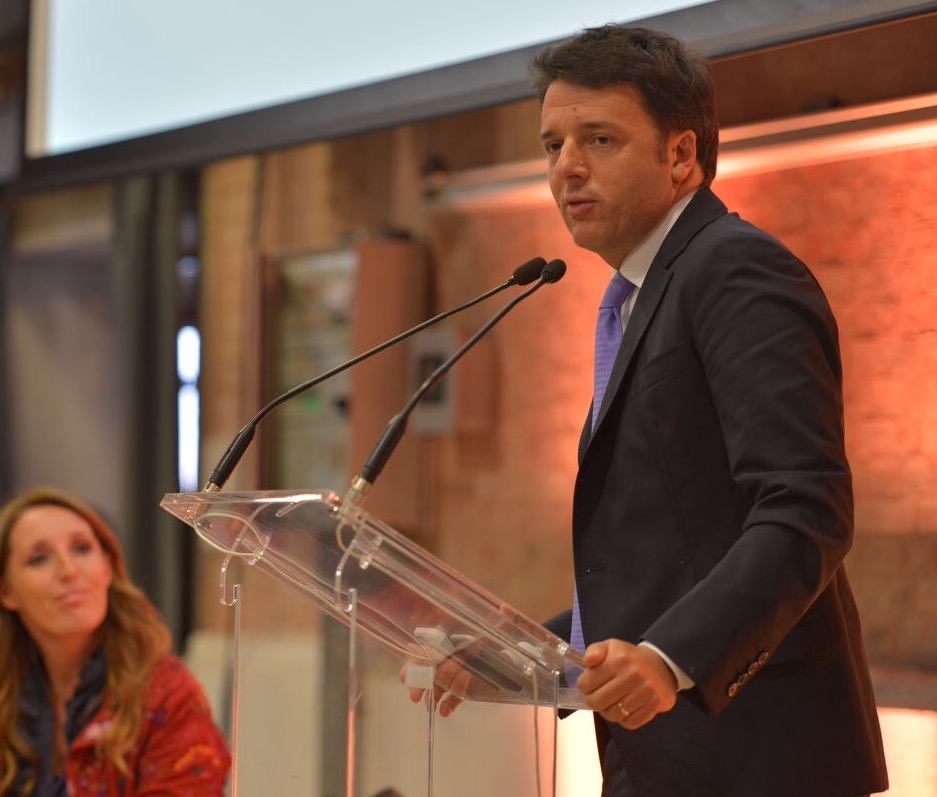
Renzi speaking at Ca' Foscari University in Venice

In March 2014, the Renzi Cabinet approved the auctioning of a large number of luxury cars that were used to transport heads of state, including nine Maseratis, two Jaguar Cars, and various other cars such as BMWs and Alfa Romeos. Out of the 1,500 cars put up for sale, 170 sold immediately over eBay. In April, as part of his wider industrial reforms, Renzi forced the chief executives of Italy's biggest state-owned companies, including Eni, Terna, Finmeccanica, Enel, and Poste italiane, to resign, citing a lack of public confidence in their leadership. He subsequently appointed women to the majority of new positions, making it the first time any woman had served as a chief executive of a state-owned company in Italy. In April 2014, Renzi's cabinet introduced the so-called "Renzi bonus", a monthly allowance of €80, recognised to holders of a total annual income not exceeding €24,600. The bonus, whose aim was to relaunch expenditures, was heavily criticised by the opposition, which labelled it as an "electoral bakshish" for the 2014 European Parliament election.

On 1 August, Renzi launched a law decree called Unblock Italy, which was intended to facilitate the implementation of major projects, civil works, and infrastructure that were suspended at the time, and achieve further administrative simplification. The centre of this was the Millegiorni, or the Thousand Days Programme. On 1 September, Renzi launched the website passodopopasso.italia.it, which allowed citizens to monitor the progress of the Millegiorni. On 9 October, Renzi presented his first Finance Bill (Legge di Stabilità), which was approved by the European Commission on 28 October. A €36 billion bill, it included the largest tax cuts in a year (€18 billion), as well as tax evasion fight, plus the €80 bonus; it was criticised by trade unions like the CGIL, the CISL, and FIOM, while the UIL was more positive and Confindustria supported it.

In February 2015, with the economy continuing to stagnate, the government announced a plan to abolish rules that limit cooperative lenders' shareholders to one vote each at shareholder meetings regardless of the size of their holdings. The European Commission subsequently forecast that the Italian economy would begin to grow by the spring. The government also announced the abolition of IRAP, a regional tax on production activities; discussing the 2016 Finance Bill, Renzi further promised to cancel IRPEF, IMU, and TASI, respectively taxes on individuals, public services, and residence, which was a flagship policy of the centre-right former prime minister Silvio Berlusconi, and its tax-cutting 2016 budget was passed on 22 December despite concerns from the European Commission. Additionally, Renzi raised the threshold for cash payments three times with the intention to boost the economy, promising that it would not help tax evasion, and described it as "a simple, fair, and liberal measure" that "simplifies" and "encourages consumption". In 2018, Minister of Economy and Finance Pier Carlo Padoan admitted that it was a mistake. A 2021 study by the Bank of Italy concluded that the decision "increased the share of the illegal economy by 0.5 percentage points" and "a 1% increase in the use of cash leads to growth between 0.8% and 1.8%" of the black economy.

In May 2015, the economy recorded growth of 0.3%, finally ending the Italian triple-dip recession. In January 2016, Renzi highlighted an additional 500,000 jobs that he said had been created through his policies. In October 2016, the Renzi government's proposed 2017 Finance Bill, an expansionary budget including deficit raising to cope with the earthquake and migrants emergencies, was seen as an increasing anti-Brussels rhetoric, having warned of disaster if it was rejected. In an interview with la Repubblica on 23 October, Padoan said: "Europe must choose which side to take. They can accept the fact that our deficit goes up from 2% to 2.3% (of gross domestic product) to tackle the earthquake and the migrant emergencies. Or they can choose the Hungarian way, which puts up walls against the migrants and must be rejected. That would be the beginning of the end." On 24 October, defending the budget law, Renzi said: "We want to address the needs of Italian citizens, not Brussels technocracy."

==== Constitutional and electoral reforms ====
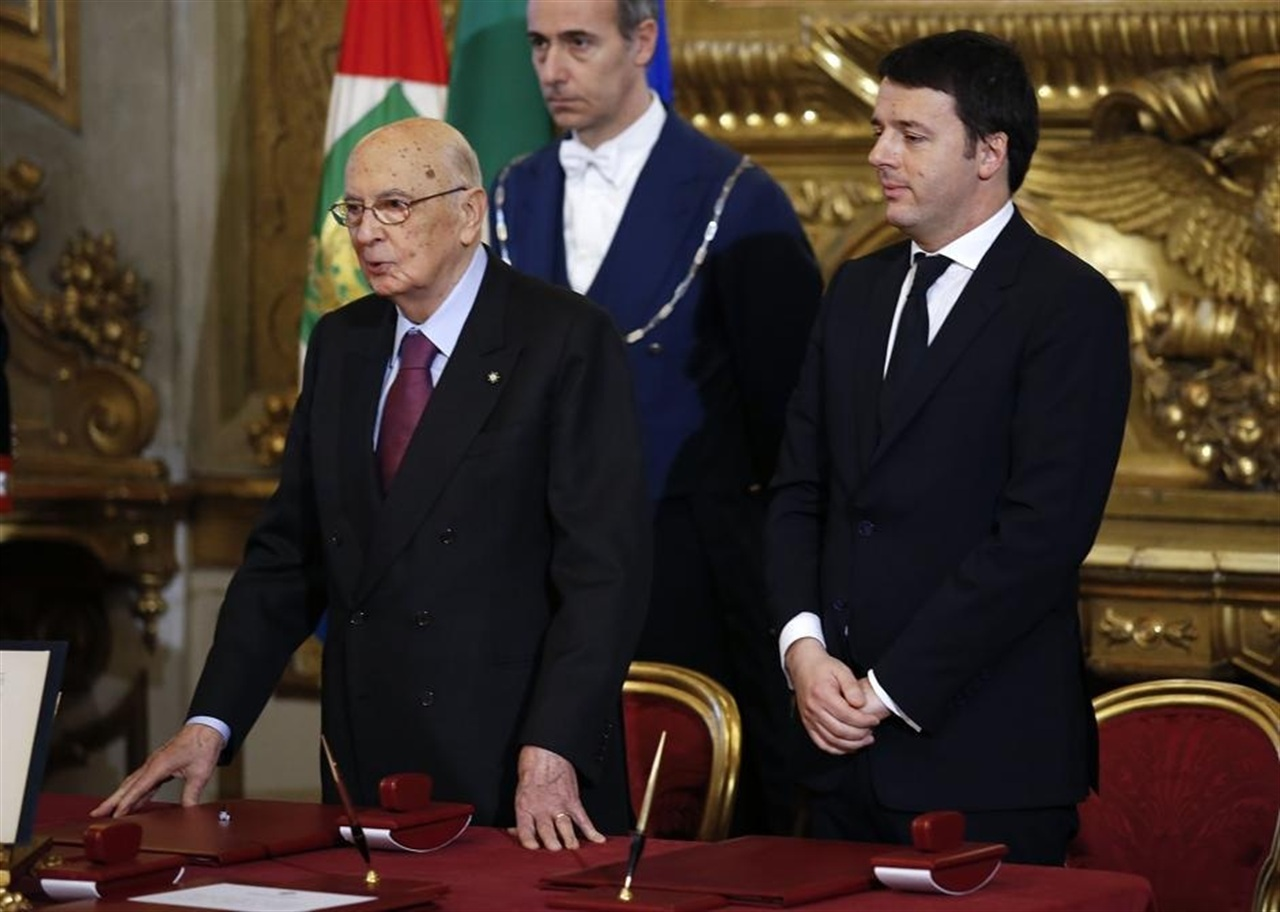
Renzi with President Giorgio Napolitano

Upon becoming prime minister, Renzi stated that one of his most important tasks was to achieve constitutional reforms; by April 2014, Renzi's government presented a constitutional bill of government initiative. The Italian institutional framework had remained essentially unchanged since 1 January 1948, when the Constitution of Italy first came into force after being enacted by the Constituent Assembly of Italy on 22 December 1947, and Renzi argued changes were necessary to make governments more stable; the system was created as a result of the Italian Fascist regime and to avoid such a repeat. The Italian Communist Party (PCI) pushed for unicameralism under proportional representation, being wary of unicameralism under majoritarian representation to avoid a tyranny of the majority and like part of the Italian Socialist Party (PSI) seeing the Senate as a synonym of privilege and prospering in the Fascist regime's shadows, while the Christian Democracy (DC) party advocated bicameralism through a division of powers to avoid one-party hegemony. The Action Party, the DC, the Italian Republican Party, and part of the socialists won out over the PCI and dissident socialists, especially about the Senate. The actually-existing system was not the intended result of the assembly, which came about through later political choices and conditions.

The first stage of Renzi's reform package aimed to abolish the so-called "perfect bicameralism", which gave identical powers to the Chamber of Deputies and the Senate of the Republic; the reforms would substantially decrease the membership and power of the Senate. Constitutional reforms were in the air since April 2013, when then-President Giorgio Napolitano instituted a committee for reform to avoid the repeat of inconclusive legislative elections, as it had happened two months earlier. Under the reforms, the Senate's power to force the resignation of the government by refusing to grant a vote of confidence would be removed; only a few types of bills, including the constitutional bills, constitutional amendments, laws regarding local interests, referendums, and the protection of linguistic minorities, would need to be passed by the Senate. In addition, the Senate could only propose amendments to bills in some cases, with the Chamber of Deputies always having the final word, and the membership of the Senate would be changed, with regional representatives appointed in a manner virtually identical to the Bundesrat of Germany. On 11 March 2014, the Chamber of Deputies approved both the plans to overhaul the Senate and the second stage of Renzi's constitutional reforms, a flagship electoral reform law that would see Italy's voting system overhauled. On 26 March, despite objections raised by several parties in the coalition, it won a vote in the Senate on the bill reforming the provinces, with 160 voting in favour and 133 against.

On 6 May, the Constitutional Affairs Committee of the Senate approved the government's bill on the Senate's reform. Due to the ambitious reforms that provided for the Senate abolition, which would have led to, in the words of Valentino Larcinese, "a shift towards a de facto quasi-presidential system embedded in de jure parliamentary institutions", and an increase in the powers of the Prime Minister, plus a new electoral law, Renzi was accused by constitutionalists and politicians, among them Stefano Rodotà and Fausto Bertinotti, of being an authoritarian and anti-democratic leader. Critics like the centre-left populist Five Star Movement (M5S) and its founder Beppe Grillo argued that the reforms would give too much power to the Prime Minister; the former centre-right prime minister Silvio Berlusconi, who has been controversial, argued the changes would "lead us straight toward a non-democracy." The Economist argued that the reforms would result in corrupted politicians being appointed in the Senate. Renzi and his government argued that the constitutional reform was long sought by the PCI and the political left; political scientist Nadia Urbinati commented that this was an oversimplification and that it was the political right that has attacked bicameralism, arguing that the reform had more in common with that of Lega Nord's Francesco Speroni in 1994.

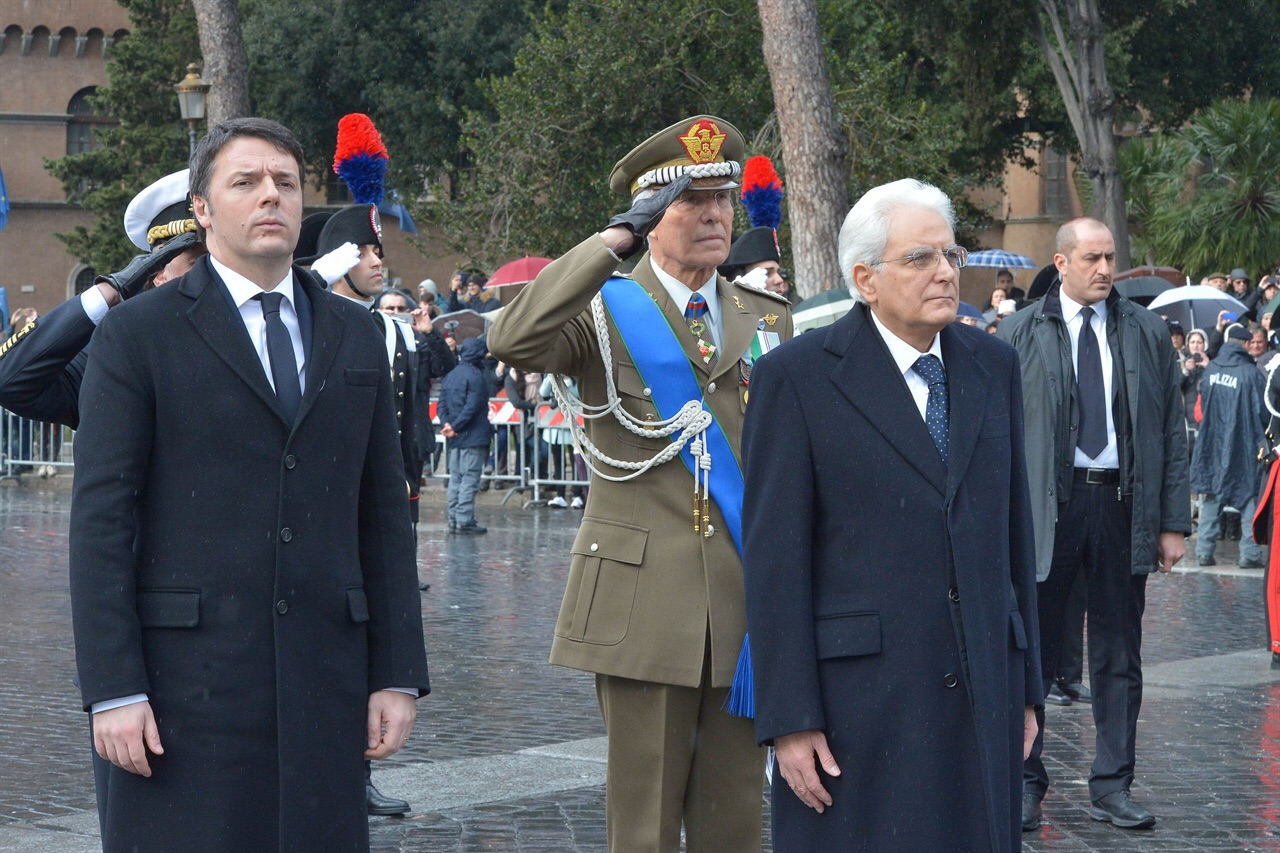
Renzi inspecting troops with President Sergio Mattarella

In April 2014, Renzi proposed that Italy adopt what he called Italicum, a proportional representation voting system, with a majority bonus for the party which obtained over 40% of the vote in order to provide for stable and long-term government. To approve the new electoral law, which was opposed by the M5S and a minority of the PD, Renzi gained the support of Berlusconi, who was still the leader of Forza Italia (FI), despite having been expelled from the Senate due to his sentence for tax evasion. The alliance between Renzi and Berlusconi was named the Nazareno Pact, from the name of the street in Rome where the headquarters of the PD is located, where the two leaders met for the first time to discuss the reform. The alliance, which included a secret clause stating that Berlusconi's rival and long-time centre-left leader Romano Prodi, a founder of the PD, would not become the president of the Italian Republic, fell apart and was called off by FI, in part due to the election of PD-backed, centre-left candidate Sergio Mattarella in the 2015 Italian presidential election.

Renzi was criticised by many within the PD's left-wing minority for the deal with Berlusconi, as well as by the M5S of Grillo, who said the Nazareno Pact was the proof that there are no differences between the Italian centre-left and centre-right. Despite concern from some within the PD, Italicum was given final approval by the Senate on 27 January 2015 thanks to support from FI senators.

On 28 April, concerned that the reform may not pass, Renzi announced he would hold a confidence vote to approve the electoral reform changes. The M5S, FI, and some left-wing PD members opposed this decision, with some seeking to draw comparisons between Renzi and Benito Mussolini. It would be only the third time that an electoral law was twinned with a confidence vote after Mussolini's Acerbo law and the DC prime minister Alcide De Gasperi's "scam law". On 4 May, the Chamber of Deputies approved Renzi's flagship electoral changes with 334 votes for and 61 votes against, the latter including a faction of the PD. The reform took full effect in July 2016; however, it was found to be partially unconstitutional by the Constitutional Court of Italy in January 2017, and was then repealed and replaced by the Italian electoral law of 2017 (Rosatellum).

In a September 2015 interview in New York, Renzi said he did not need Berlusconi's votes for the reform, which he described as "a revolution", to pass. Having passed the Chamber of Deputies on 11 March 2015, the reforms to the Senate that would see its power diminished and membership changed were passed by the Senate on 13 October. The vote was won by 176 votes to 16, with a large number of senators abstaining from the vote in protest at having to vote on abolishing many of their own powers. The last vote was held on 12 April 2016, when the Chamber of Deputies approved the reform with 361 votes, while the opposition abandoned the house. On 4 December, the reform was rejected in the 2016 Italian constitutional referendum and Renzi resigned as a result.

==== Immigration ====
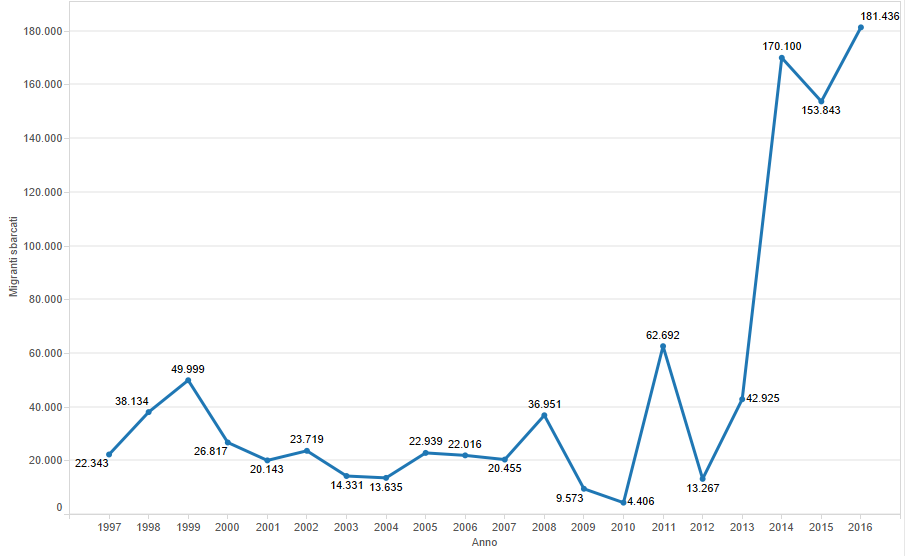
Number of immigrants arriving by boat in Italy from 1997 to 2016

As a result of the Libyan and Syrian Civil Wars, a major problem faced by Renzi upon becoming prime minister was the high levels of illegal immigration to Italy. 2014 saw an increase in the number of migrants rescued at sea being brought to southern Italian ports, with the increase in the number of migrants prompting criticism of Renzi by the anti-immigration Lega Nord, the Five Star Movement, and Silvio Berlusconi's Forza Italia party. On 8 August, the Renzi Cabinet approved a law-decree providing for the international protection of migrants. In November 2014, Renzi ordered the Italian-run rescue option Operation Mare Nostrum to be replaced by Frontex's Operation Triton due to the refusal of several EU governments to fund it. In 2014, 170,100 migrants arrived in Italy by sea, a 296% increase compared to 2013. 141,484 of the travellers were ferried over from Libya. Most of the migrants had come from Syria, Eritrea, and various countries in West Africa.

From January to April 2015, about 1,600 migrants died on the route from Libya to Lampedusa, making it the deadliest migrant route in the world. On 19 April 2015, a migrant shipwreck took place in the Mediterranean Sea, causing the death of more than 700 migrants from North Africa. Renzi, returning to Rome from a political event in Mantua for the 2015 Italian regional elections, held an emergency meeting with ministers and spoke by telephone to French president François Hollande, Maltese prime minister Joseph Muscat, and Greek prime minister Alexis Tsipras. The call led to an emergency meeting of European interior ministers to address the problem of migrant deaths. In a speech addressing immigration, Renzi condemned human trafficking as a "new slave trade". About the crisis, Renzi said: "Europe is the greatest political victory of the twentieth century, but it is fuelled by ideals, not by the short-sightedness of those who would raise walls. Europe is in danger of collapsing when it becomes simply a set of self-interests." In January 2016, his Foreign Minister Paolo Gentiloni said: "A choice must be made between Dublin and Schengen. Both agreements cannot hold today."

==== Same-sex unions ====
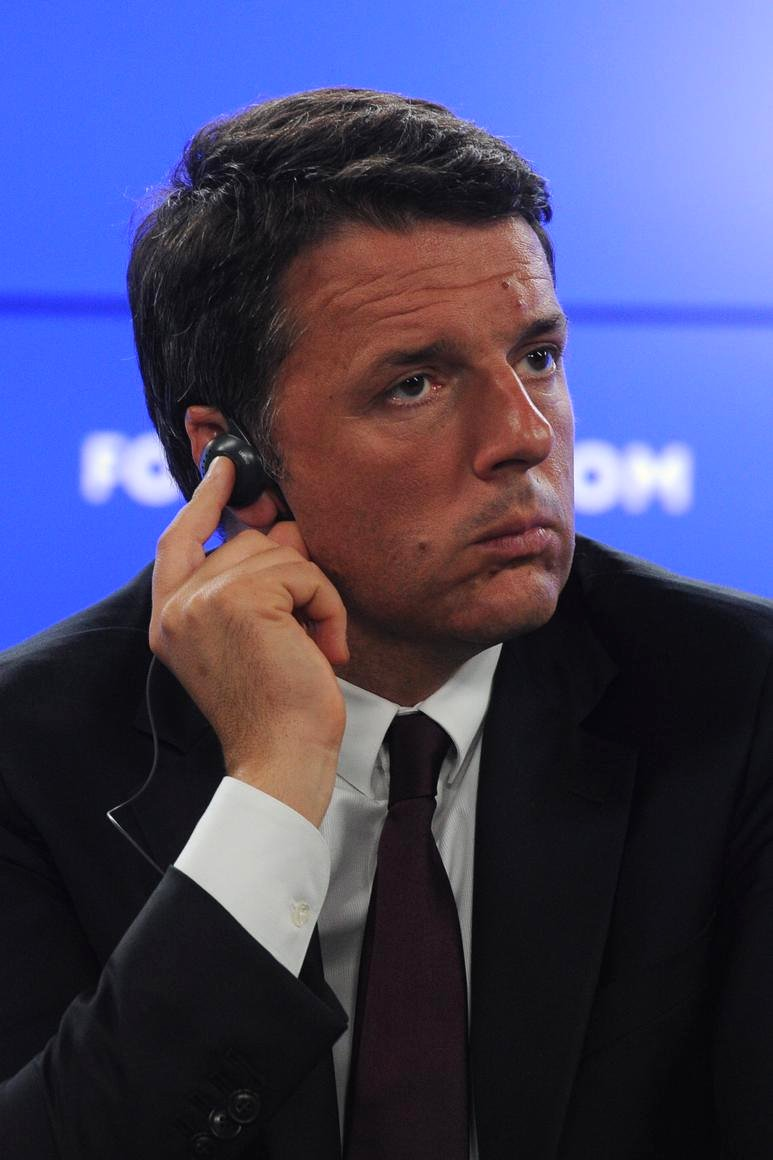
Renzi during a press conference in June 2016

On 10 June 2015, the Chamber of Deputies passed a motion obliging the government to approve a bill regarding civil unions between same-sex couples. Previously, all of the major political parties in Italy had presented different motions on civil unions, which were all rejected except for the PD's, which also called for civil unions to be approved. Shortly before becoming prime minister, Renzi stated that he favoured the introduction of civil unions for same-sex couples. In July 2015, several days after the European Parliament passed a motion calling on all members of the European Union to recognise same-sex relationships, the European Court of Human Rights ruled that Italy was violating the Convention on Human Rights by not recognising same-sex couples' "right to family life".

On 7 October, Renzi introduced a bill to the Italian Parliament that would establish same-sex civil unions and gender-neutral cohabitation agreements. The bill passed its first reading in the Senate a week later. Although Renzi secured the support of the PD and the main opposition Forza Italia party, many conservative and Catholic members of parliament from both parties, including one of its coalition partners, the New Centre-Right (NCD), criticised the bill. Despite the bill being put forward on a free vote, Renzi made it clear that he would tie the civil unions bill to a vote of confidence in his government if it did not pass.

Following months of public and parliamentary debate, the Senate voted in favour of Renzi's proposals to legalise civil unions on 25 February 2016, with 173 votes in favour and 71 against. An amendment known as the "stepchild adoption" provision that would have granted parental rights to a non-biological parent in a same-sex union was taken out of the bill at the last moment after it became clear a majority of senators did not support it. Although Renzi had expressed support for the amendment, the decision came after the Five Star Movement backed out of an agreement to pass it; moreover, the amendment was opposed by the NCD. Renzi stated that the bill's passage through the Senate was a "victory for love", although he expressed disappointment that the stepchild provision was not also adopted, and raised the possibility of introducing it in a separate bill at a later date. On 11 May, the Chamber of Deputies approved the final proposals, with 369 votes in favour and 163 against.

==== Social policies ====
Renzi's so-called "schools package" was among its 1,000 days reforms to kickstart the Italian economy, and included hiring based on merit rather than seniority, favouring full-time hiring over substitutes, and increasing teachers for disabled children. During a press conference on 3 September 2014, Renzi announced an online consultation with students, teachers, and citizens ahead of the major school reforms promoted by education minister Stefania Giannini. On 9 July 2015, despite the opposition of an overwhelming majority of teachers and students alike to the design of the school reform, this was finally approved by the Chamber of Deputies, with 277 votes against 173.

During a ceremony at the Italian National Olympic Committee on 1 December 2014, Renzi officially launched the candidacy of Rome for the 2024 Summer Olympics. Renzi stated: "Our country too often seems hesitant. It's unacceptable not to try or to renounce playing the game. Sport in Italy is a way of life and a way of looking at the future. I don't know if we’ll make it, but the Olympic candidacy is one of the most beautiful things we can do for our kids, for us, for Italy." On 21 September 2016, the mayor of Rome Virginia Raggi, a member of the Five Star Movement, told reporters the bid for the games would go no further. Raggi, having long been opposed to Rome hosting the games, cited ongoing financial troubles in the country as the main reason for cancelling the bid. She said hosting the games would be "irresponsible" and would only cause the city to fall into further debt.

==== Universal Exposition ====
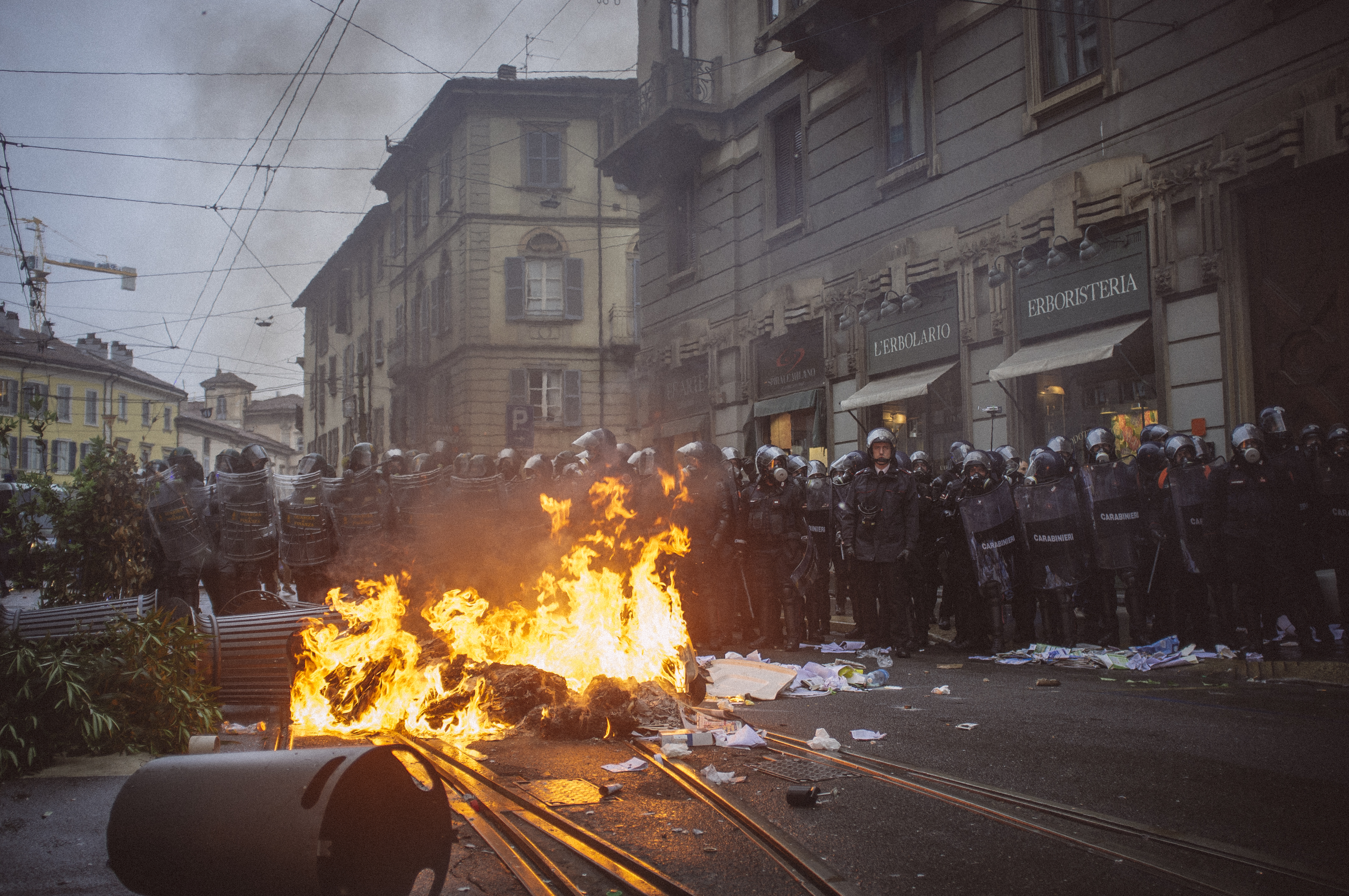
"No-Expo" protests during the inauguration of Expo 2015 in Milan

During Renzi's premiership, Milan hosted the Universal Exposition; the themes were technology, innovation, culture, and traditions concerning food. Participants to the Expo, hosted inside the Expo 2015 pavilions, included 145 countries, three international organisations, several civil society organisations, several corporations, and non-governmental organisations.

The opening of the Expo on 1 May 2015 was met with protest from anti-austerity activists, black bloc, and anarchists caused criminal damage, resulting in the police using tear gas. Expo also created some tensions with the Holy See and the Italian government; Pope Francis condemned the concept of Expo, saying that it "obeys the culture of waste and does not contribute to a model of equitable and sustainable development". As Vatican City invested €3 million to obtain its own pavilion at the event before his appointment to the papacy, Pope Francis said that although it is a good thing that the Church is involved in causes that battle hunger and promote cleaner energy, too much money was wasted on the Expo itself by Vatican City.

==== 2016 earthquakes ====
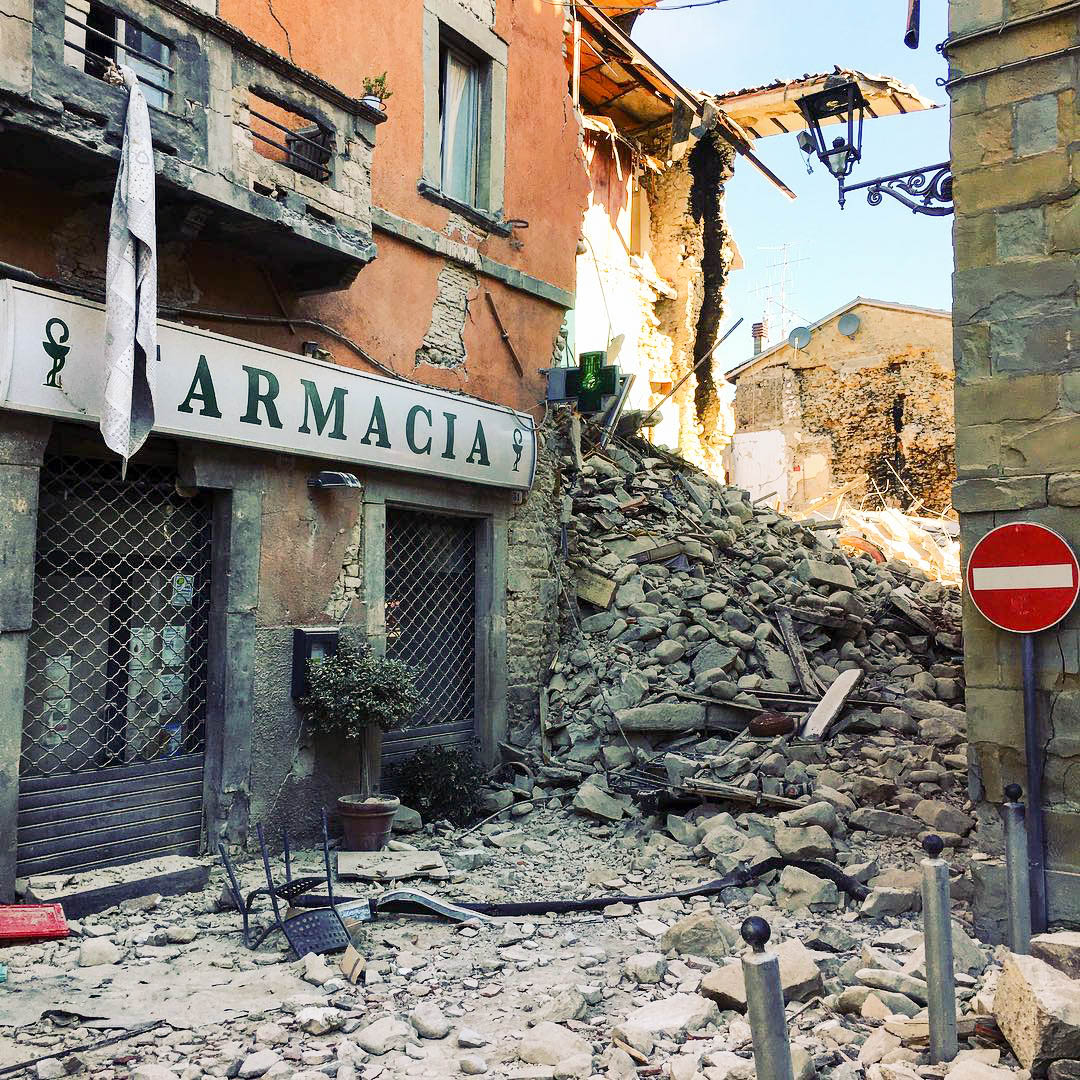
Rubble in the town centre of Amatrice, 2016

At 03:36 CEST on 24 August 2016, an earthquake measuring 6.2 on the moment magnitude scale struck Central Italy. The epicentre was close to Accumoli, in an area near the borders of the Umbria, Lazio, Abruzzo, and Marche regions. The earthquake killed 298 people and left more than 4,500 homeless. On 1 September, Renzi appointed Vasco Errani, the former president of Emilia-Romagna who had been already a Special Commissioner during the 2012 Emilia earthquake, as Special Commissioner for Reconstruction.

A magnitude 6.1 intraplate earthquake struck 3 km (2 mi) west of Visso on 26 October at 21:18 local time (19:18 UTC). The earthquake, which occurred two months after a magnitude 6.2 earthquake in August, struck about 30 km (20 mi) to the northwest of the August earthquake's epicentre. The civil protection estimated the consequences less dramatically than feared. According to official data, a man died because he had suffered a heart attack as a result of the quake.

A third large, shallow earthquake of USGS preliminary magnitude 6.6 struck 6 km (4 mi) north of Norcia at 07:40 local time (06:40 UTC) on 30 October. This quake was the largest in Italy in 36 years, since the 1980 Irpinia earthquake. The three earthquakes caused almost 100,000 homeless.

=== Foreign affairs ===
Official trips made by Renzi as Prime Minister of Italy

During his premiership, Renzi faced several challenging foreign policy situations, such as the European debt crisis, the civil war in Libya, the Russo-Ukrainian War, and the insurgency of the Islamic State in the Middle East. Renzi formed a close relationship with US president Barack Obama, supporting the 2014 military intervention against the Islamic State of Iraq and the Levant with hundreds of Italian troops and four Panavia Tornado aircraft, and also supporting sanctions after the 2014 Russian military intervention in Ukraine. Renzi forged a positive relationship with Japanese prime minister Shinzō Abe, who praised the economic policies of the Renzi government. A key ally of Renzi in the Mediterranean was Egyptian president Abdel Fattah el-Sisi; the two leaders held many bilateral meetings where they discussed the problem of immigration to Italy and the increasing tensions in the Middle East and North Africa.

In the European Union, Renzi had a close relationship with French president François Hollande and his Prime Minister Manuel Valls, who saw Renzi as a model for his Third Way policies.

==== Europe ====
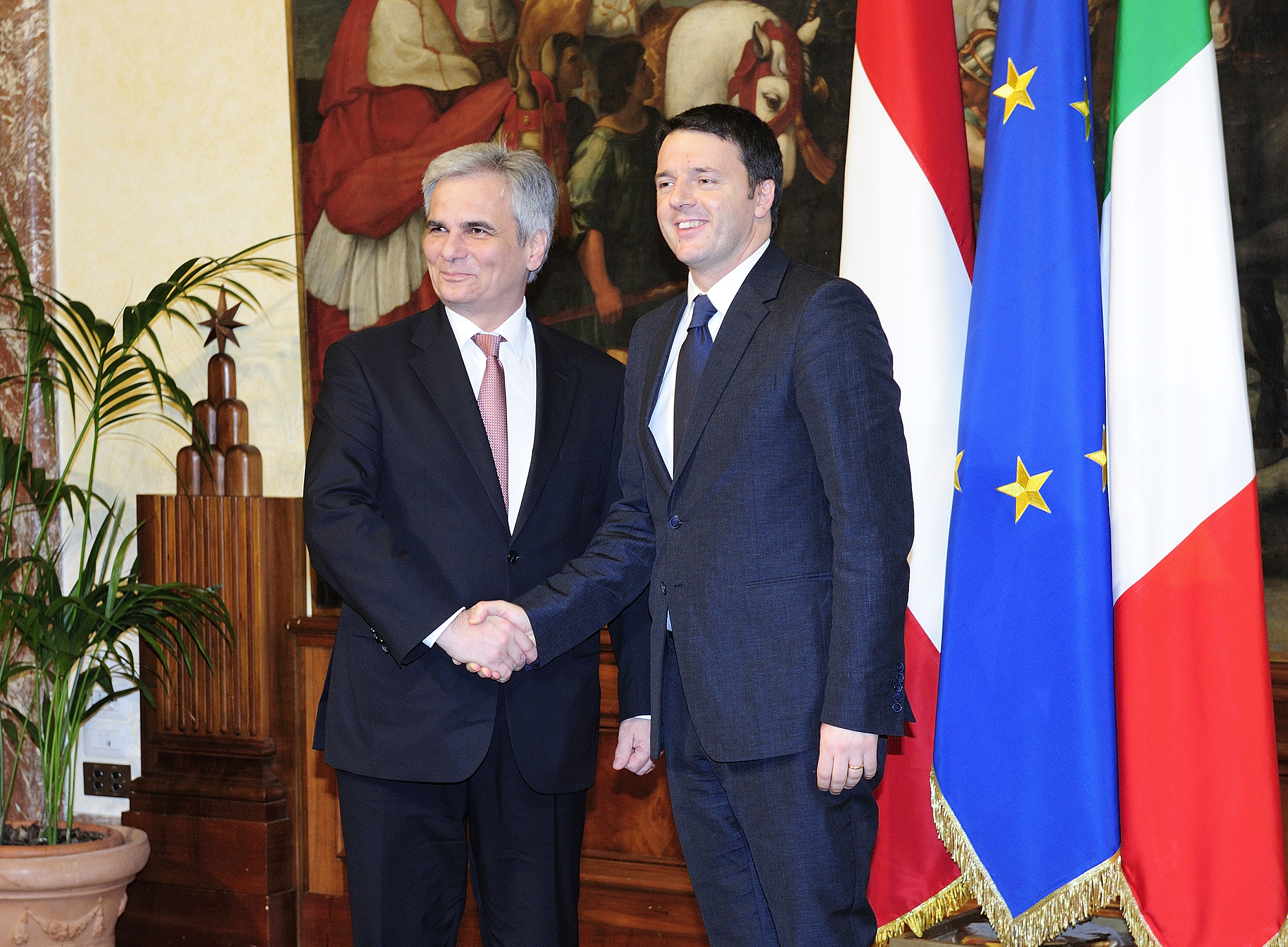
Renzi with Austrian chancellor Werner Faymann in 2014

Following the 2014 European Parliament election in Italy, which saw the PD receive the highest number of votes of all the individual political parties contesting that election across the entire European Union, Renzi subsequently emerged as the most prominent leader of the PES. This was in opposition to German chancellor Angela Merkel, widely considered the de facto leader of the European People's Party; the two leaders have been referred to as Merkenzi. Renzi and Merkel had many bilateral meetings, the first on 17 March in Berlin, just a few weeks after Renzi's election as prime minister, where the two leaders discussed important reforms that the Italian government planned to make both in Italy and in the European Union. On 22 January 2015, Merkel visited Renzi in his home city of Florence, where she publicly lauded the "impressive" reforms carried out by his government. On the following day, the two leaders held a joint press conference in front of Michelangelo Buonarroti's David.

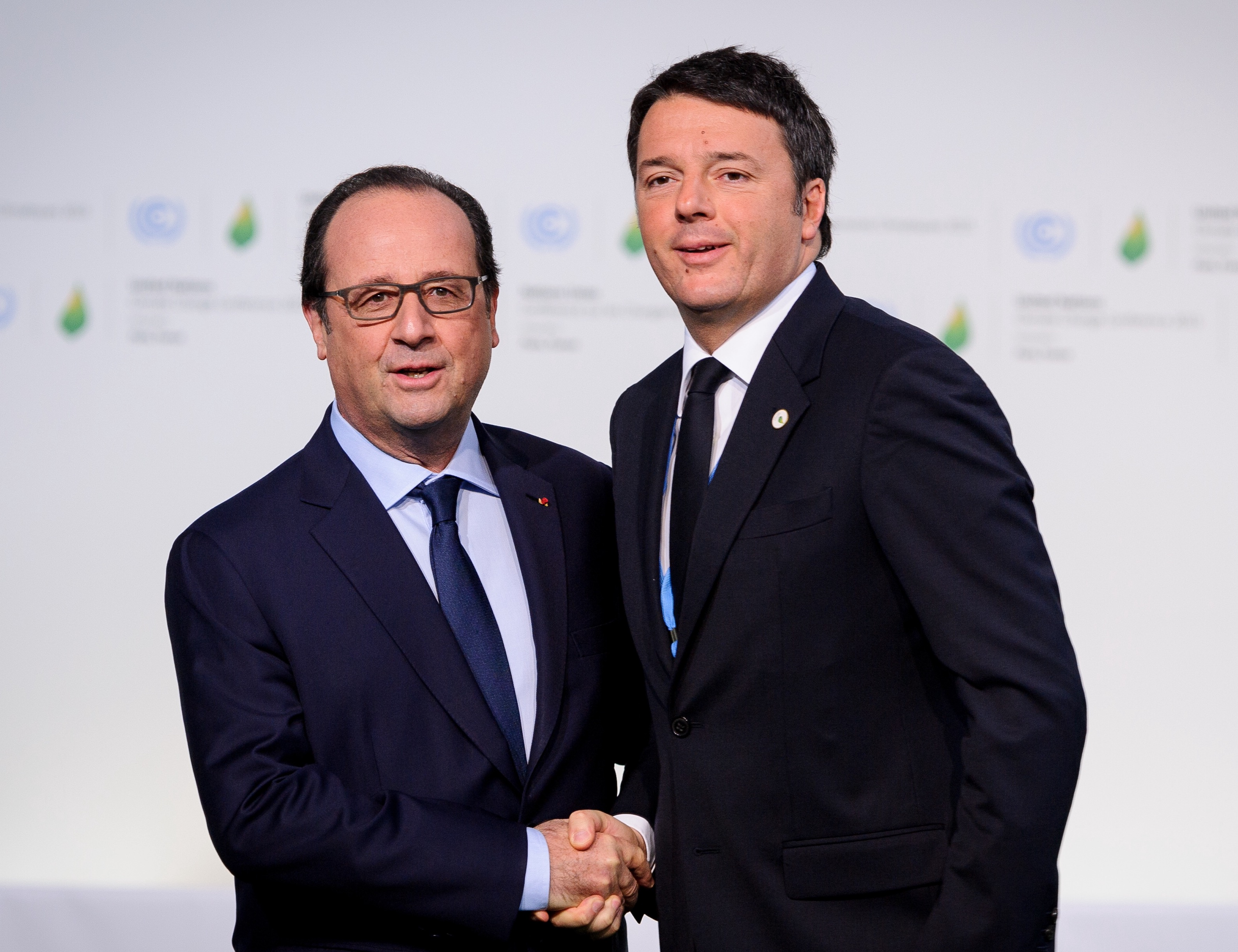
Renzi with French president François Hollande in 2015

Renzi is seen as an ally of French president François Hollande of the Socialist Party. On 15 March 2014, Renzi met Hollande in Paris, agreeing with him a common economic policy focused not only on the austerity measures imposed by the so-called European troika of the European Commission, European Central Bank, and International Monetary Fund but also on more flexible policies to promote economic growth in the European Union. Renzi is a close personal friend of French prime minister Manuel Valls, with the two leaders often regarded as being heirs of the Third Way politics espoused by the likes of Tony Blair. On 7 January 2015, after the Charlie Hebdo shooting in Paris which caused the death of 17 people, Renzi expressed horror and dismay, offering his best wishes to the people of France, noting his close relationships with the French prime minister and Paris mayor Anne Hidalgo. On 11 January, he joined more than forty world leaders and three million people in the Republican marches organised by President Hollande.

Renzi built a constructive relationship with the British prime minister David Cameron of the Conservative Party. During their first meeting on 1 April 2014, Cameron stated that the reforms planned by Renzi were "ambitious" and that together the two men would be able to change the European Union. On the same day, Renzi also met Blair, the former British prime minister whom Renzi had previously called a political inspiration to him. On 2 October, Renzi held a press conference with Cameron in 10 Downing Street, with Cameron lauding their similar policies to reform the European Union and overcome the economic crisis.

On 1 August, following his party's strong showing in the European Parliament elections, Renzi nominated his Foreign Minister Federica Mogherini as a candidate to be the new High Representative of the Union for Foreign Affairs and Security Policy in the incoming-European Commission to be led by Jean-Claude Juncker, the former Prime Minister of Luxembourg. Mogherini was eventually successfully confirmed as the High Representative, ensuring that Italy controlled one of the two most senior posts in the European Commission.

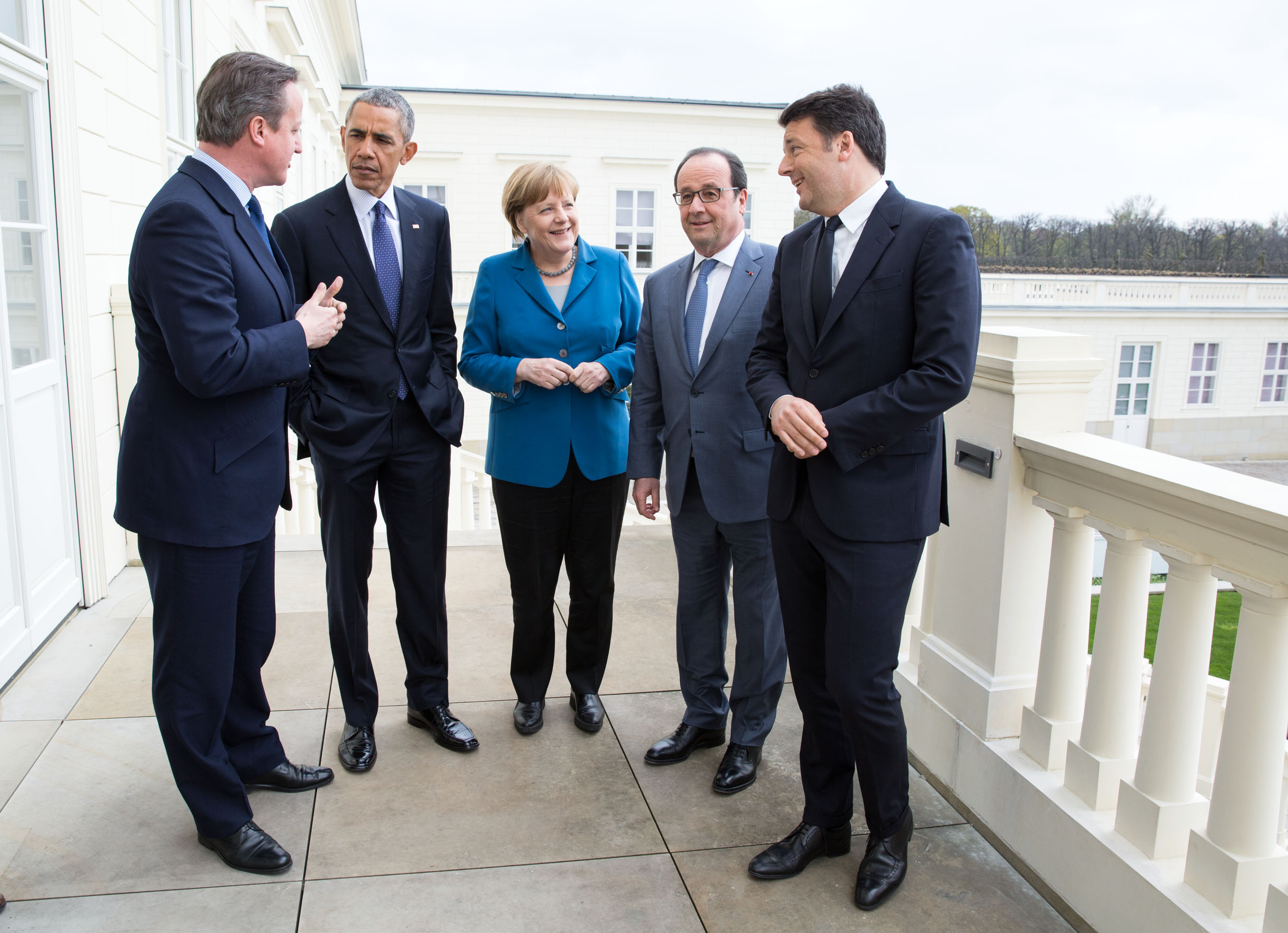
Renzi and the other NATO Quint leaders in 2016

In September, Renzi participated in the 2014 Wales summit. Before the official start of the summit, he had discussions with Ukrainian president Petro Poroshenko, US president Barack Obama, and the other three leaders of the European G4 to discuss the crisis with Russia. This summit was the first held after the Russian military intervention in Ukraine and the 2014 Iraq conflict with the Islamic State of Caliph Abu Bakr al-Baghdadi.

On 3 February 2015, Renzi received the newly elected Greek prime minister Alexis Tsipras of SYRIZA in Rome. The two leaders held a joint press conference expressing concerns about austerity measures imposed by the European Commission and stated that economic growth is the only way to solve the crisis. After the press conference, Renzi presented Tsipras with an Italian tie as a gift. Tsipras, who was notable for refusing to ever wear a tie, thanked Renzi and said he would wear the gift in celebration after Greece had successfully renegotiated the austerity measures.

==== United States ====
Similar to his predecessors, Renzi continued the long-standing Italian policy of a close relationship with the United States, building a partnership with President Barack Obama. Italy supported the United States in the military intervention against the Islamic State of Iraq and the Levant (ISIL), and participated in the international sanctions during the Ukrainian crisis against Russia following their invasion of East Ukraine.

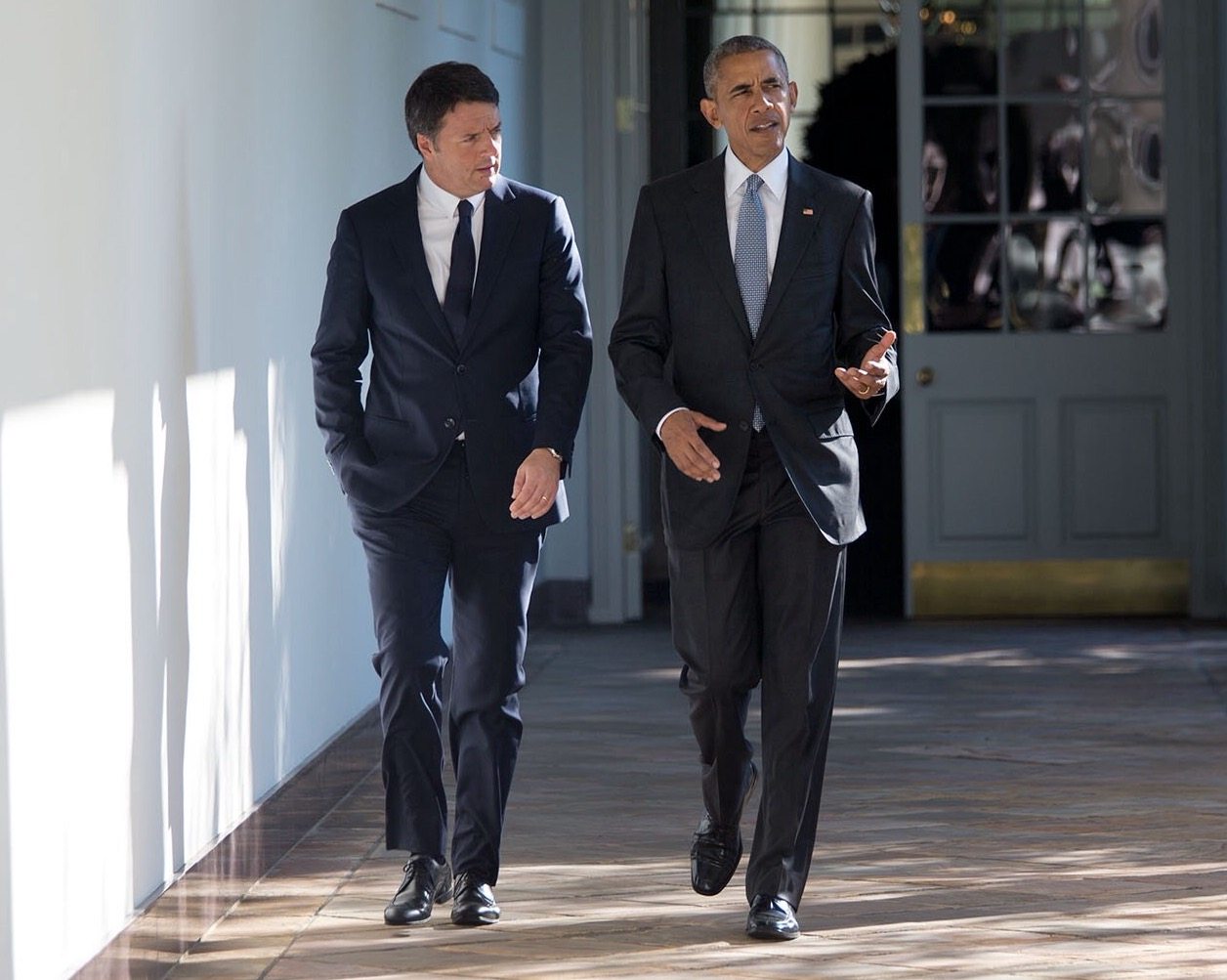
Renzi with President Barack Obama at the White House in October 2016

Renzi met Obama for the first time on 24 March 2014 during the latter's trip to Rome. Renzi also held a joint meeting with Obama, Pope Francis, and Italian president Giorgio Napolitano. Obama stated afterwards that he had been impressed by the reforms Renzi wanted to undertake. Renzi himself said that he considered Obama an example of the policies he wanted to achieve.

On 22 September, Renzi visited Silicon Valley in California. In San Francisco, he met with young Italian emigrants who have created startup companies in the United States. He also visited the headquarters of Twitter, Google, and Yahoo! to hold talks with chief executives. Renzi was accompanied by former Secretary of State Condoleezza Rice and George Shultz, and by the former American ambassador to Italy Ronald P. Spogli. He later spoke at Stanford University as the guest of university president John L. Hennessy.

The following day, Renzi spoke at a United Nations summit in New York City, focusing on the problem of climate change. Following the summit, Renzi met former president Bill Clinton and his wife, the former Secretary of State Hillary Clinton. At the end of his trip, Renzi participated in a reception hosted by Obama.

Renzi was received at the White House in April 2015. He and President Obama discussed many issues, including the war in Donbas, the Libyan Civil War, and ISIL. They discussed Europe's economy, the Transatlantic Trade and Investment Partnership, and climate change and energy security. In October 2015, the Italian government announced that it would prolong its military presence in Afghanistan along with the United States Army in order to continue its security mission and prevent the rise of Islamist forces such as Al-Qaeda and ISIL.

On 18 October 2016, President Obama invited Renzi and his wife Agnese Landini to attend an official state dinner at the White House. The two men held a joint press conference during which Obama, the dinner being his final state visit as the United States president, commented that he had "saved the best for last", and the two reiterated their support for one another.

==== Asia ====
Renzi built up a close relationship with Japanese prime minister Shinzō Abe; the two Prime Ministers were both against austerity and seeking to reform the constitutions of their countries. On 6 June 2014, Renzi received Prime Minister Abe in Rome. Abe publicly congratulated Renzi for the economic and constitutional reforms being delivered by Renzi's government. The two leaders also met in Tokyo in August 2015 and discussed relations with China and the stability of East Asia.

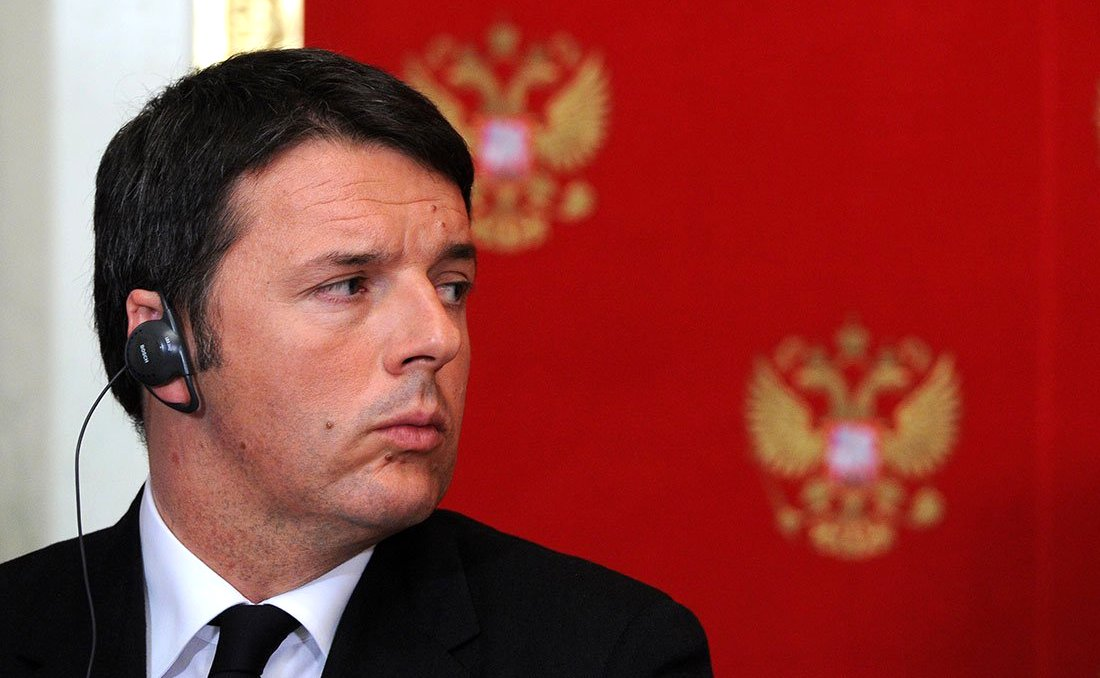
Renzi during a press conference in March 2015

On 9 June, Renzi travelled to Hanoi, Vietnam, to meet with President Trương Tấn Sang, Prime Minister Nguyễn Tấn Dũng, and the Communist Party of Vietnam's general secretary Nguyễn Phú Trọng to sign economic treaties worth around US$5 billion to the Italian economy. In doing so, Renzi became the first Italian prime minister to officially visit Vietnam since 1973, when diplomacy first began between Italy and North Vietnam. During the visit, Renzi placed a wreath in the mausoleum of the former North Vietnamese president Ho Chi Minh.

On 11 June, Renzi met in Beijing with Chinese president Xi Jinping, who congratulated him for the "important reforms" being undertaken by his government. Xi also stated that China would continue co-operation with Italy ahead of Expo 2015 in Milan. Several months later in October, Renzi met with Chinese prime minister Li Keqiang in Rome to sign twenty treaties worth a total of €8 billion.

On 12 June, Renzi met Kazakh president Nursultan Nazarbayev in Astana, where they discussed withdrawal of Italian Army from Afghanistan. On 18 November, Renzi travelled to Ashgabat, Turkmenistan, where he signed with Turkmen president Gurbanguly Berdimuhamedow a number of economic pacts securing increased gas supply.

==== Africa ====
During his premiership, Renzi started a policy review which led to the creation of the Italy–Africa initiative, which included renewable energy cooperation and a new package of development aid in fields stretching from health care to culture; counterterrorism has been a key part of his agenda, but the East Africa region is also important to stop the migration flows from there to Italy through North Africa, especially Libya.

On 4 March 2014, Renzi travelled to Tunisia, where he had a meeting with Mustapha Ben Jafar. With Jafar, Renzi discussed the problem of illegal immigration to Italy from the coasts of North Africa. The trip to Tunisia was the first official one made by Renzi as prime minister. On 18 March 2015, after the Bardo National Museum attack in Tunis, in which 28 people died and four of whom were Italians, Renzi condemned the terrorist attack and said that Italy is close to the Tunisian government and people.

On 19 July, Renzi started a major trip to Africa, meeting the Mozambican president Armando Guebuza. Renzi signed economic pacts to create investments by the Italian government-owned oil company Eni in the African country for US$50 billion. The following day, he visited the Republic of the Congo, where he met Congolese president Denis Sassou Nguesso, with whom he signed a co-operation for the extraction of oil in the country. Some journalists like Giuseppe Oddo criticised the meeting with Sassou Nguesso, who is considered one of the more corrupt dictators of Africa. Renzi later met with Angolan president José Eduardo dos Santos in Luanda. During the visit, Renzi placed a memorial wreath in the mausoleum of Agostinho Neto, the first Angolan president.

On 24 July, under the direction of Foreign Minister Federica Mogherini, the government worked for the release of Mariam Yahia Ibrahim Ishag, a Sudanese woman had been who sentenced to death for being a Christian. Thanks largely to the good relations between Sudan and Italy, Ibrahim was released and permitted to fly to Italy on a government plane.

On 2 December, Renzi went to Algiers, where he met Algerian president Abdelaziz Bouteflika and Prime Minister Abdelmalek Sellal. With the two leaders of the country, Renzi discussed the 2014 Libyan crisis, immigration from North Africa, and also about gas imports from Algeria as an alternative to Russian imports, following the tensions between the European Union and Russia.

In January 2016, Renzi continued his policy toward Africa; he had a three-day trip to Nigeria, Ghana, and Senegal. The main tasks of this diplomatic trip were the fight against the Islamic terrorism and the European migrant crisis in the Mediterranean Sea; with Nigerian president Muhammadu Buhari, Renzi signed an agreement on enhancing co-operation between the Nigerian Police and the Italian Police.

Renzi has been one of the strongest supporters of Libyan prime minister Fayez al-Sarraj and of his government of national union. In August 2016, la Repubblica reported that dozens of Italian special forces were operating in Libya for training and intelligence activities. These special forces were operating under the direct command of the Prime Minister's office.

==== Russia ====
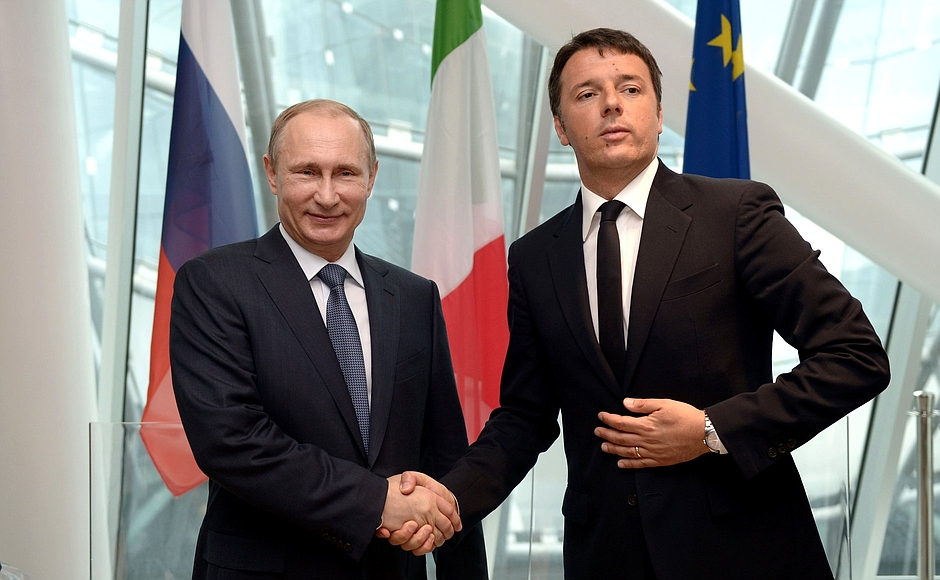
Renzi and President Vladimir Putin at the opening of Russia Day at Expo 2015

Russia had previously enjoyed a privileged relationship with Italy, particularly under the leadership of Silvio Berlusconi, who was a personal friend of Russian president Vladimir Putin. Following the 2014 Russian annexation of Crimea and the beginning of the Russo-Ukrainian war, relations worsened. On 2 March, Renzi accused Putin of having committed "an unacceptable violation". During a speech to the Chamber of Deputies on 19 March, Renzi stated that the 2014 Crimean status referendum was illegal and that cooperation between G8 countries was necessary to solve the diplomatic crisis resulting from the annexation of Crimea. In June, he subsequently participated in the 40th G7 summit in Brussels, the first one held after the suspension of Russia from the G8 following the annexation of Crimea in March.

Renzi phoned Putin on 28 August, asking him to stop the "intolerable escalation" and to reach a peace agreement with Ukrainian president Petro Poroshenko to stop the war in Donbas. Renzi and Putin also had a bilateral meeting on 16 October, when Renzi hosted the Asia–Europe Meeting in Milan with 53 other leaders of the world. During the 2014 G-20 Brisbane summit on 15 November, the two leaders had another meeting, where they discussed the war in Donbas but also on the civil wars in Libya and Syria.

On 5 March 2015, Renzi met President Putin and Prime Minister Dmitry Medvedev in Moscow. The talks between the leaders were focused on international issues, such as the settlement of the Russo-Ukrainian war, the situations in the Middle East and in Libya, as well as fighting terrorism. Putin guaranteed Russian support in case of a United Nations intervention in Libya against the Islamic State of Iraq and the Levant. Ahead of the bilateral meeting, Prime Minister Renzi visited and laid flowers at the Moscow bridge, near the Kremlin, on which the Russian opposition leader Boris Nemtsov was murdered a few days before.

Through 2015, Renzi became one of the main supporters of a reduction of international sanctions against Russia and the establishment of a political and military alliance between the Western countries and Russia against Islamic terrorism. Renzi questioned Nord Stream 2, a new Russia–Germany natural gas pipeline, saying: "I found it surprising that the South Stream project was blocked [the Balkan pipeline South Stream was cancelled by Russia in December 2014 following obstacles from the EU], while now we are discussing a doubling up of Nord Stream."

==== Middle East ====
On 2 August 2014, Renzi met with Egyptian president Abdel Fattah el-Sisi in Cairo, holding talks about a variety of issues, including the 2014 Israel–Gaza conflict. Renzi stated that Italy would support the Egyptian truce proposal, with the two leaders calling for an immediate cease-fire and the beginning of peace negotiations. In making the visit, Renzi became the first Western world leader to visit President el-Sisi since 2014 Egyptian presidential election. On 15 January 2015, after the Islamic State's conquests in Libya, Renzi conducted a long phone call with Sisi, to discuss the terrorist threat in the Mediterranean. The two leaders agreed that the next steps should be political and diplomatic efforts through the United Nations. On 11 July, a car bomb exploded outside the Italian consulate in Cairo, resulting in at least one death and four injured. The Islamic State claimed responsibility.

The relations between Italy and Egypt dramatically worsened after the murder of Giulio Regeni, an Italian Cambridge University graduate student killed in Cairo following his abduction on 25 January 2016. Regeni was a PhD student at Girton College, Cambridge, researching independent trade unions in Egypt. Due to Regeni's research activities and left-wing political leanings, the security services of el-Sisi's government are strongly suspected of involvement in his murder, although Egypt's media and government deny this and say secret undercover agents belonging to the Muslim Brotherhood carried out the crime in order to embarrass the Egyptian government and destabilise relations between Italy and Egypt.

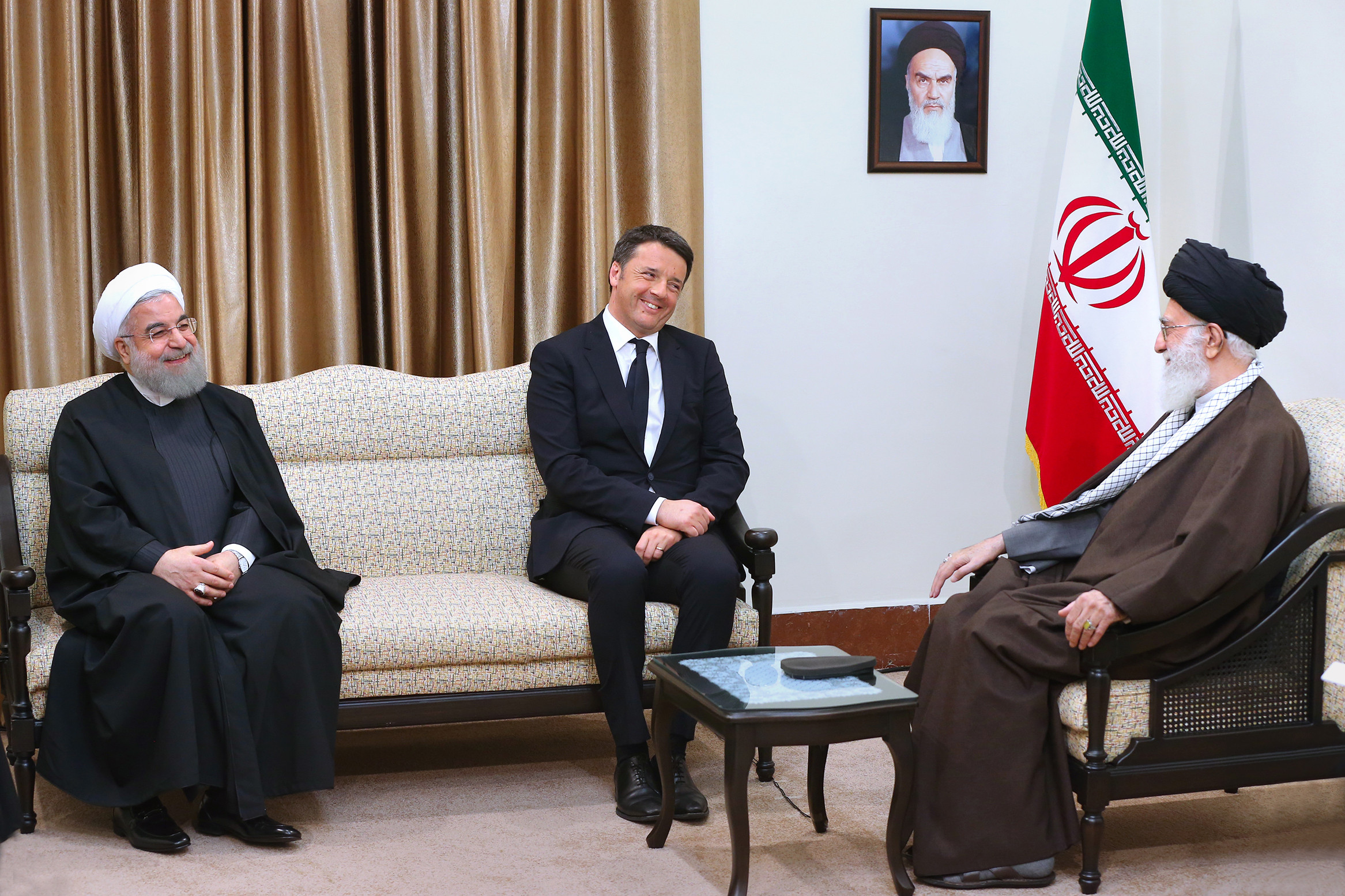
Renzi with Iranian president Hassan Rouhani meeting with Supreme Leader Ali Khamenei, 12 April 2016

On 20 August 2014, Renzi travelled to Iraq in the midst of the insurgency led by the Islamic State. He met with President Fuad Masum, Prime Minister Haider al-Abadi, and his immediate predecessor Nouri al-Maliki. On the same day, Renzi travelled north to Erbil to meet Mas'ud Barzani, the president of Iraqi Kurdistan, and Prime Minister Nechervan Barzani. Renzi later told an American journalist that what he witnessed during his trip to Iraq reminded him of the images of the Srebrenica massacre that had horrified him as a child. While Renzi was in Iraq, the Italian Parliament approved a proposal to arm the Peshmerga soldiers fighting against the Islamic State.

During the 69th United Nations General Assembly on 23 September, Renzi held a bilateral meeting with the Turkish president Recep Tayyip Erdoğan, at which they discussed climate change and increasing tensions in the Middle East. On 11 December, Renzi travelled to Ankara for a second meeting with Erdoğan, during which Renzi expressed his support for accession of Turkey to the European Union. On the same day, he met with Turkish prime minister Ahmet Davutoğlu.

On 8 January 2015, Renzi made his first official trip of the year, meeting with Crown Prince Mohammed Bin Zayed Al Nahyan in Abu Dhabi to address issues of foreign and economic policy, including the Alitalia-Etihad Airways deal. The two leaders discussed joint co-operation domains and enhancing trade exchange and co-operation in energy and aerospace.

As Prime Minister, Renzi had good relations with both Israeli prime minister Benjamin Netanyahu and Palestinian president Mahmoud Abbas. On 21 and 22 July 2015, he visited first Jerusalem, where he met with Netanyahu and addressed the Knesset, and then Ramallah, where he met with Abbas. Renzi was the first leader to visit Israel after the Joint Comprehensive Plan of Action, the deal reached between P5+1 and Iran. Whereas Netanyahu criticised the deal, Renzi supported it, saying that "Israel's security is the security of Europe and mine as well."

In January 2016, Renzi met with Iranian president Hassan Rouhani in Rome, the first visit to Italy by a President of Iran since 1999. The two leaders signed business deals worth up to €17 billion. They also discussed the war against the Islamic State in the Middle East and Libya. On 13 and 14 April, he became the first Western leader to visit Iran after the international agreement on the nuclear program of Iran. In Iran, Renzi met both President Rouhani and Supreme Leader Ali Khamenei.

==== Latin America ====
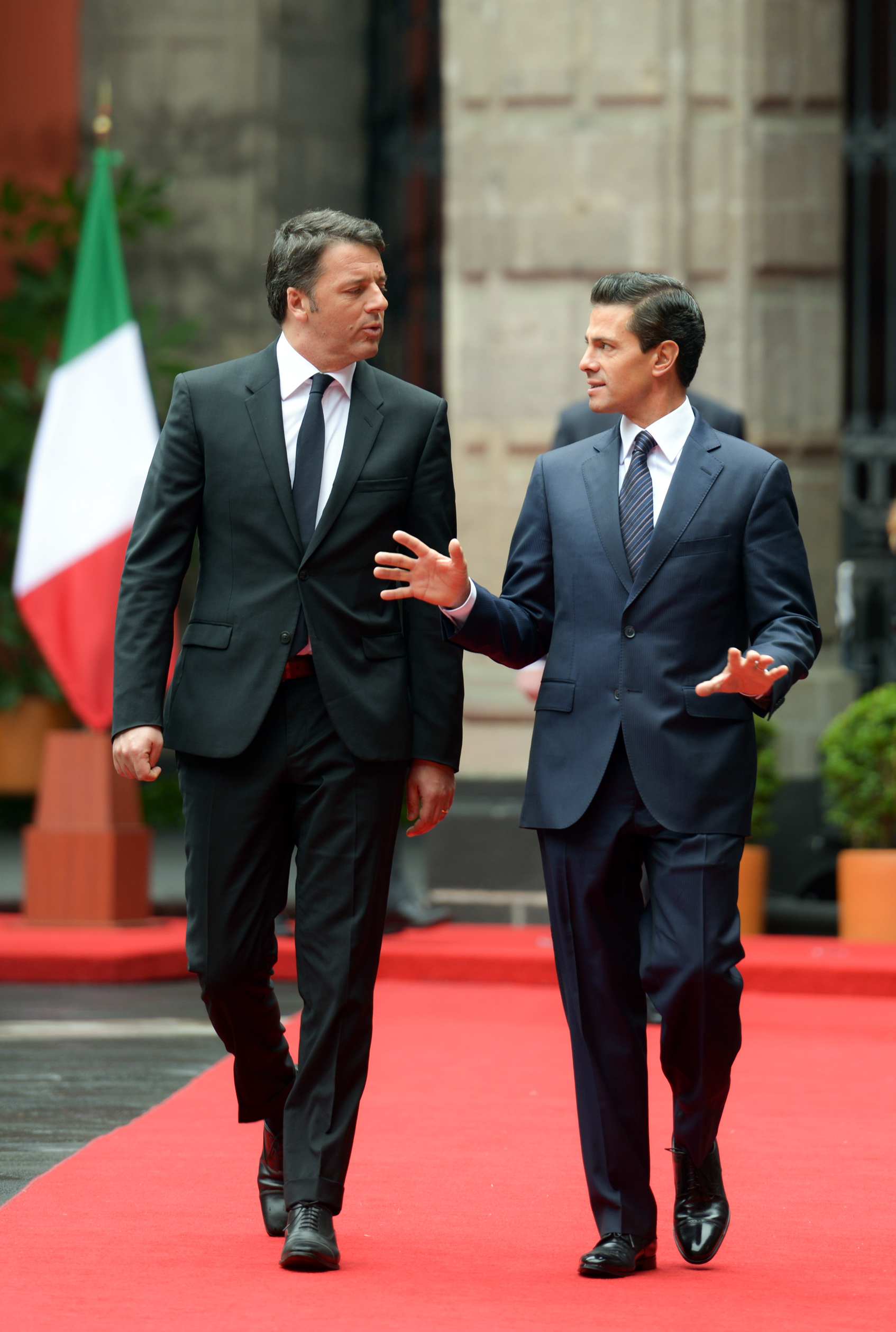
Renzi with Mexican president Enrique Peña Nieto in Mexico City, 22 April 2016

After announcing an increase in Italian investment in Central America and South America, Renzi undertook a number of official trips across the continent, travelling to Chile, Peru, and Colombia in October 2015. During his visit to Santiago, Renzi and Chilean president Michelle Bachelet launched a large number of renewable energy projects promoted by the Italian multinational Enel. Renzi also visited the European Southern Observatory of Paranal in the Atacama Desert. During these trips, Renzi had numerous meetings with communities of Italian-born Latin Americans in these countries.

In a surprise visit on 28 October, Renzi became the first Italian prime minister in history to make a state visit to Cuba. In doing so, he also became the first G7 leader to meet Cuban president Raúl Castro following the United States–Cuban Thaw of relations between the United States and Cuba.

In February 2016, Renzi met Argentine president Mauricio Macri during a state visit to Buenos Aires; Renzi became the first European leader to meet Macri after the 2015 Argentine general election and the first Italian prime minister since Romano Prodi in 1998 to visit Argentina. During his premiership, Renzi has also developed close relationship with Mexican president Enrique Peña Nieto.

== After the premiership (2016–present) ==
Following the defeat in the constitutional referendum and the subsequent resignation as prime minister in December 2016, Renzi remained secretary of the Democratic Party (PD). As leader of the main party in both the Chamber of Deputies and the Senate of the Republic, he supported the new government led by his former Minister of Foreign Affairs Paolo Gentiloni, also a PD deputy. In February 2017, Renzi resigned as secretary, only to be re-elected in the 2017 PD leadership election in April. Following poor results in the 2018 Italian general election, Renzi resigned as secretary for good in March.

In September 2019, Renzi left the PD to found the liberal party Italia Viva (IV). As a member of the PD, the party moved at the opposition in June 2018 against the populist Conte I Cabinet of Lega–Five Star Movement (M5S). In August 2019, Renzi played a key role in returning the PD to government with the M5S and the left-wing Free and Equal; he then joined the government with IV to keep Lega and Matteo Salvini out of power, leading to both the rise and fall of the Conte II Cabinet through the 2021 Italian government crisis in January, and then supporting the national-unity government of the Draghi Cabinet in February 2021.

=== 2017 leadership election and party split ===
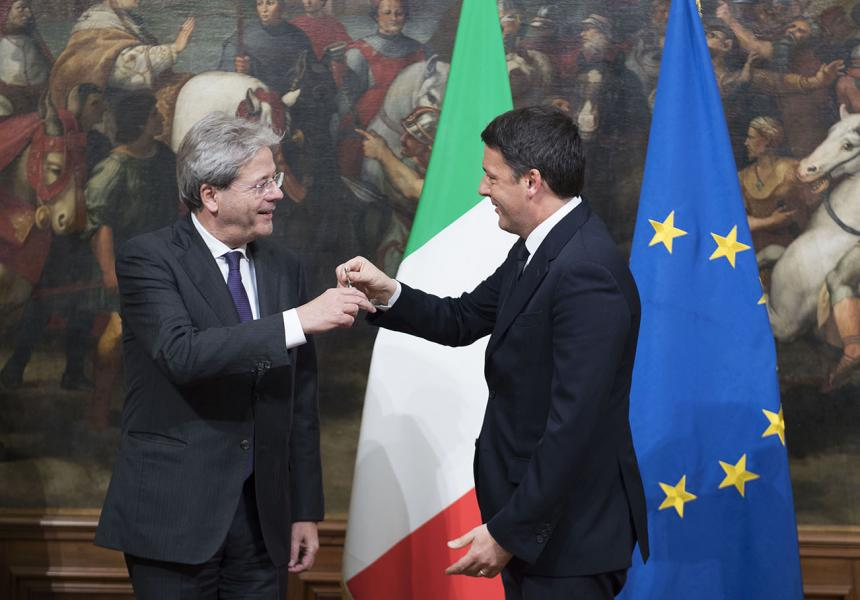
Renzi with Prime Minister Paolo Gentiloni during the swearing-in ceremony

During the PD National Assembly on 19 February 2017, Renzi resigned as the party secretary, announcing his candidacy for the next leadership election. A few days before, he launched the movement In Cammino ("On the Way") in support of his candidacy. Contextually, a large portion of the party's internal left wing, led by Enrico Rossi and Roberto Speranza, who were endorsed by former party leaders Massimo D'Alema, Pier Luigi Bersani, and Guglielmo Epifani, left the PD and founded Article 1 – Democratic and Progressive Movement (MDP), along with splinters from Italian Left (SI).

On 6 March, Renzi presented his electoral programme, in which he expressed his intention to renovate the party, Italy, and Europe. He also announced an electoral ticket with the Agriculture Minister Maurizio Martina, who became deputy secretary. From 10 to 12 March, Renzi and his supporters participated in Lingotto '17, a convention based in the district of Lingotto in Turin, where the PD was founded ten years before under the leadership of Walter Veltroni. During his speech, Renzi condemned the Five Star Movement, accused of being a populist party controlled by a private company, and Lega Nord, which uses fear to gain votes. Renzi attacked also European bureaucrats and proposed a primary election to appoint the PES candidate for the European Commission presidency and the direct election of the European president. Among the notable participants of the pro-Renzi convention were Prime Minister Paolo Gentiloni, ministers like Pier Carlo Padoan, Dario Franceschini, Graziano Delrio, Marianna Madia, and Roberta Pinotti, and secretary Maria Elena Boschi. Emma Bonino, Italian Radicals leader and former Foreign Affairs Minister, also participated in the rally.

The other two candidates for the leadership election were the president of Apulia Michele Emiliano and the Minister of Justice Andrea Orlando. Emiliano was an outspoken former magistrate with strong support in the poor South expected to join the dissidents in MDP but decided instead to challenge Renzi from within the mainstream party; he is often described as a democratic socialist and populist politician. Orlando is a social-democratic politician and a leading member of the party since the foundation, often described as the candidate of the social-democratic establishment of the party. After having won the March vote by party members with almost 67% of votes, Renzi won the PD's April primary by a landslide with 69.2% of votes, while Orlando received 19.9% and Emiliano 10.9% of votes. On 1 May, Renzi was certified to have been re-elected as the party secretary.

=== Second term as party secretary ===
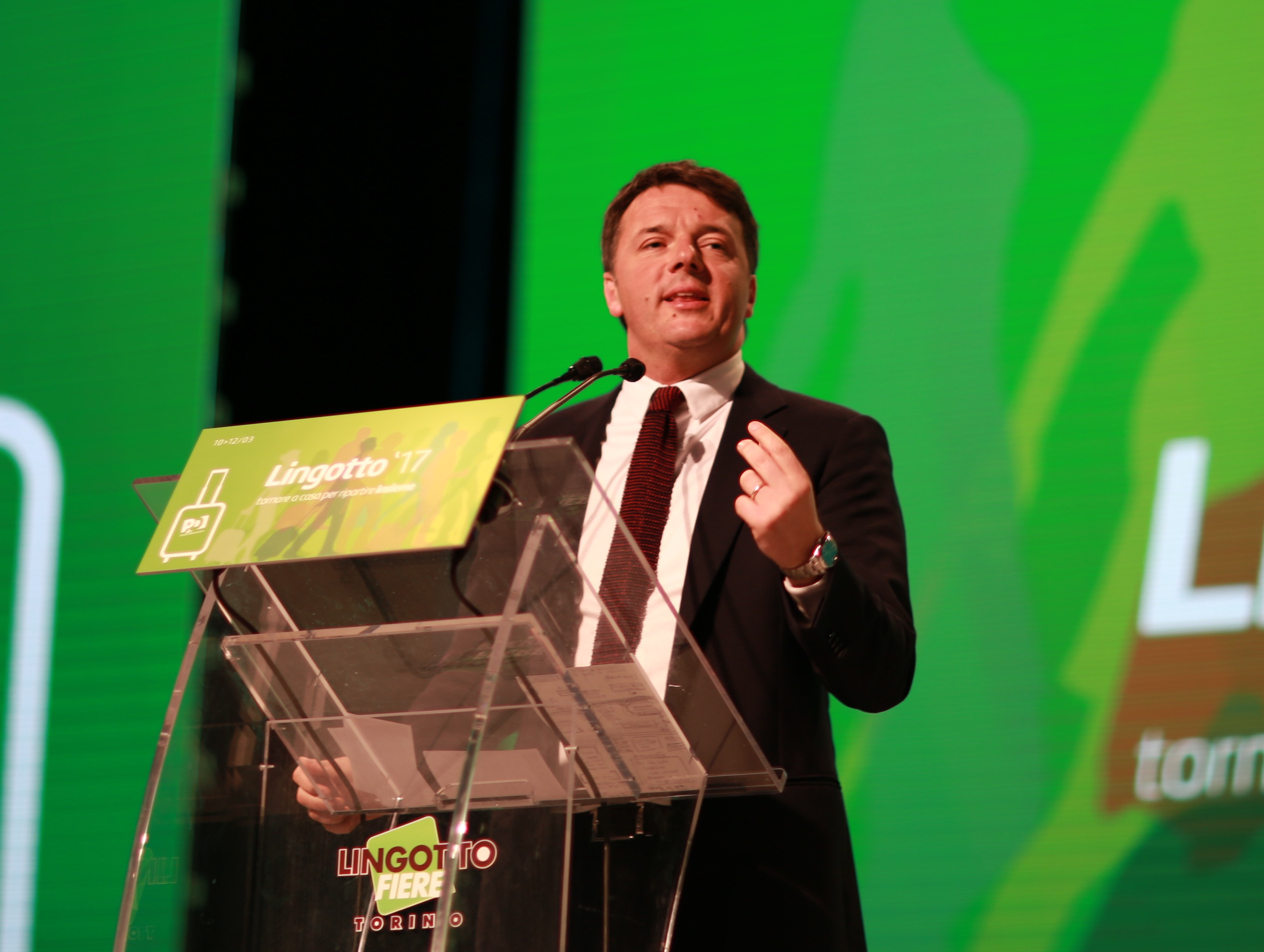
Renzi speaking at Lingotto convention

After the rejection of the constitutional reform, the parliament had to change the Italian electoral law of 2015 proposed by Renzi's government; the so-called Italicum regulated only the election of the Chamber of Deputies, and not that of the Senate, which, had the reform passed, would be indirectly elected by citizens. After the re-election as secretary, Renzi proposed a new electoral law called Mattarellum bis, better known as Rosatellum, from the name of his main proponent Ettore Rosato, PD leader in the Chamber of Deputies. This electoral law was similar to the one which was applied in Italy from 1993 to 2004.

Rosatellum used an additional member system, which acts as a mixed system, with 36% of seats allocated using a first-past-the-post voting system and 64% using proportional representation, with one round of voting. The Chamber of Deputies and the Senate did not differ in the way they allocated the proportional seats, both using the D'Hondt method of allocating seats. The new electoral law was supported by PD and his government ally Popular Alternative but also by the opposition parties Forza Italia and Lega Nord.

Despite many protests from the Five Star Movement and the MDP, the electoral law was approved on 12 October by the Chamber of Deputies with 375 votes in favour and 215 against, and by the Senate with 214 votes against 61 on 26 October.

The PD's electoral programme for the 2018 Italian general election included, among the main points, the introduction of a minimum hourly wage of €10, a measure that would affect 15% of workers, that is those workers who do not adhere to the national collective agreements; a cut of the contributory wedge for permanent contracts; a relocation allowance and an increase in subsidies for the unemployed; a monthly allowance of €80 for parents for each minor child; fiscal detraction of €240 for parents with children; and the progressive reduction of IRPEF and IRES rates, respectively the Italian income tax and the corporate tax. Moreover, the PD advocated the re-launch of the process of European integration and federation towards the formation of the United States of Europe.

In the election, Renzi's centre-left coalition arrived third behind the centre-right coalition, in which Matteo Salvini's League was the main political force, and the Five Star Movement of Luigi Di Maio that came first as a party. On 5 March, Renzi announced that the PD would be in opposition during this legislature and resign as secretary when a new cabinet is formed. Renzi officially resigned on 12 March during the PD's national directorate, and his deputy secretary Martina was appointed acting leader.

=== Leader of Italia Viva ===
In August 2019, Deputy Prime Minister and Lega's leader Matteo Salvini announced a motion of no confidence against Prime Minister Giuseppe Conte after growing tensions within the majority. Many political analysts believed the no confidence motion was an attempt to force early elections to improve Lega's standing in Parliament, ensuring Salvini could become the next prime minister. On 20 August, following the parliamentary debate at the Senate, in which Conte accused Salvini of being a political opportunist who "had triggered the political crisis only to serve his personal interest" and stated "this government ends here", the Prime Minister resigned his post to President Sergio Mattarella. Despite having always opposed it in the past, Renzi strongly advocated the formation of a new government between the PD and the populist Five Star Movement in August 2019. After days of tensions within the PD, Nicola Zingaretti, the new PD's leader, announced his favorable position regarding a new government with the M5S on 28 August, with Conte at its head. On the same day, President Mattarella summoned Conte to the Quirinal Palace for the 29 August to give him the task of forming a new cabinet. Renzi was seen by many political analysts and journalists as the real kingmaker of the new parliamentary majority.

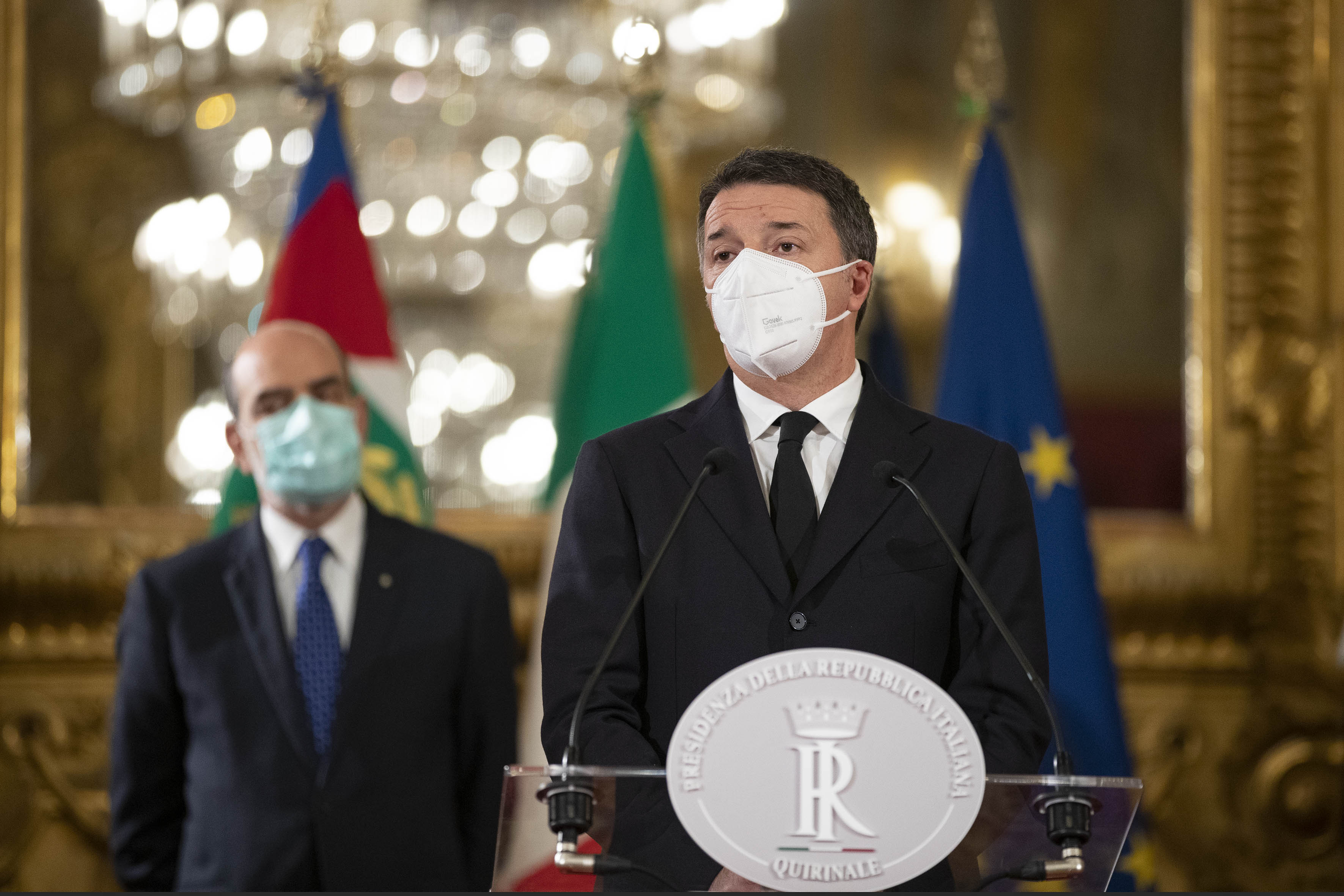
Renzi at the Quirinal Palace during the consultations for the formation of a new government in 2021

In an interview with la Repubblica on 17 September, Renzi announced his intention to leave the PD, creating new parliamentary groups led by him. On the same day, interviewed by Bruno Vespa in his TV show Porta a Porta, he officially launched the political movement Italia Viva (IV). Between December 2020 and January 2021, discussions arose within the government coalition between Renzi and Prime Minister Conte. Renzi called for radical changes to the government's economic recovery plans after the COVID-19 pandemic in Italy and also demanded that Conte cede his mandate over the secret services coordination task. During his end-of-year press conference, Conte declined Renzi's requests, saying that he still had a parliamentary majority. After a few days, Renzi threatened to pull back IV's two ministers, Teresa Bellanova and Elena Bonetti, from the upcoming Council of Ministers, summoned to approve the Next Generation EU.

During a press conference on 13 January, Renzi announced the resignation of IV's ministers Bellanova and Bonetti, officially opening the 2021 Italian government crisis. Renzi was instrumental in getting Mario Draghi as prime minister, with IV supporting Draghi's vote of confidence for a national unity government. In the 2022 Italian presidential election, Renzi supported candidate Pier Ferdinando Casini, a centrist close to the centre-right, having qualms about the precedent of re-electing the incumbent president Mattarella; after Casini failed to gain support and rejecting the candidature of Elisabetta Belloni, the head of secret services, which he criticized as "only [happening] in an anti-democratic country", Renzi joined the governing parties in asking Mattarella to accept a second term.

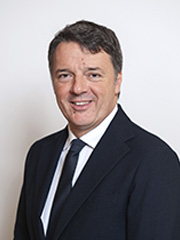
Renzi's official portrait as a senator in 2022

In the run-up of the 2022 general election, the party, which refused to join, or was refused entry to, the PD-led centre-left coalition, formed a joint electoral list with Carlo Calenda's Action. The joint list obtained 7.8% of the vote. After the election, Renzi frequently clashed with Calenda, causing the rapid dissolution of the joint parliamentary group and alliance.

In October 2023, the party held its first national congress, during which Renzi was re-elected president. In March 2024, Renzi formed liberal and pro-Europeanist list named United States of Europe, which included also More Europe, the Italian Radicals, the Italian Socialist Party and the European Liberal Democrats, in order to overcome the 4% electoral threshold. Renzi received more than 209,000 preferential votes among four constituencies but the list earned 3.77% of the vote and did not reach the 4% threshold, thus failing to gain any MEPs.

During the summer of 2024 Renzi re-positioned his party within the centre-left coalition. In September 2025, he launched "Reformist House" as a new political umbrella for IV and other liberal and centrist forces.

== Elections ==
=== 2014 European Parliament election ===
In the European Parliament elections held on 25 May 2014, the first national election Renzi had faced since becoming prime minister, his Democratic Party (PD) won 40.8% of the vote with 11,203,231 votes, becoming by far the largest party in the country with 31 members of the European Parliament (MEPs). The PD won the most votes of any single party across the whole of the European Union, won the largest number of MEPs for any single party, and the largest party within the Progressive Alliance of Socialists and Democrats, the PD's European Parliament group.

The PD's vote share was the best result for an Italian party in a nationwide election since the 1958 Italian general election, when Christian Democracy won 42.4% of the vote. The positive electoral result enabled Renzi to successfully nominate his Foreign Minister Federica Mogherini as the new High Representative of the Union for Foreign Affairs and Security Policy, ensuring that an Italian would occupy one of the European Union's two most powerful political positions.

=== 2015 Italian presidential election ===
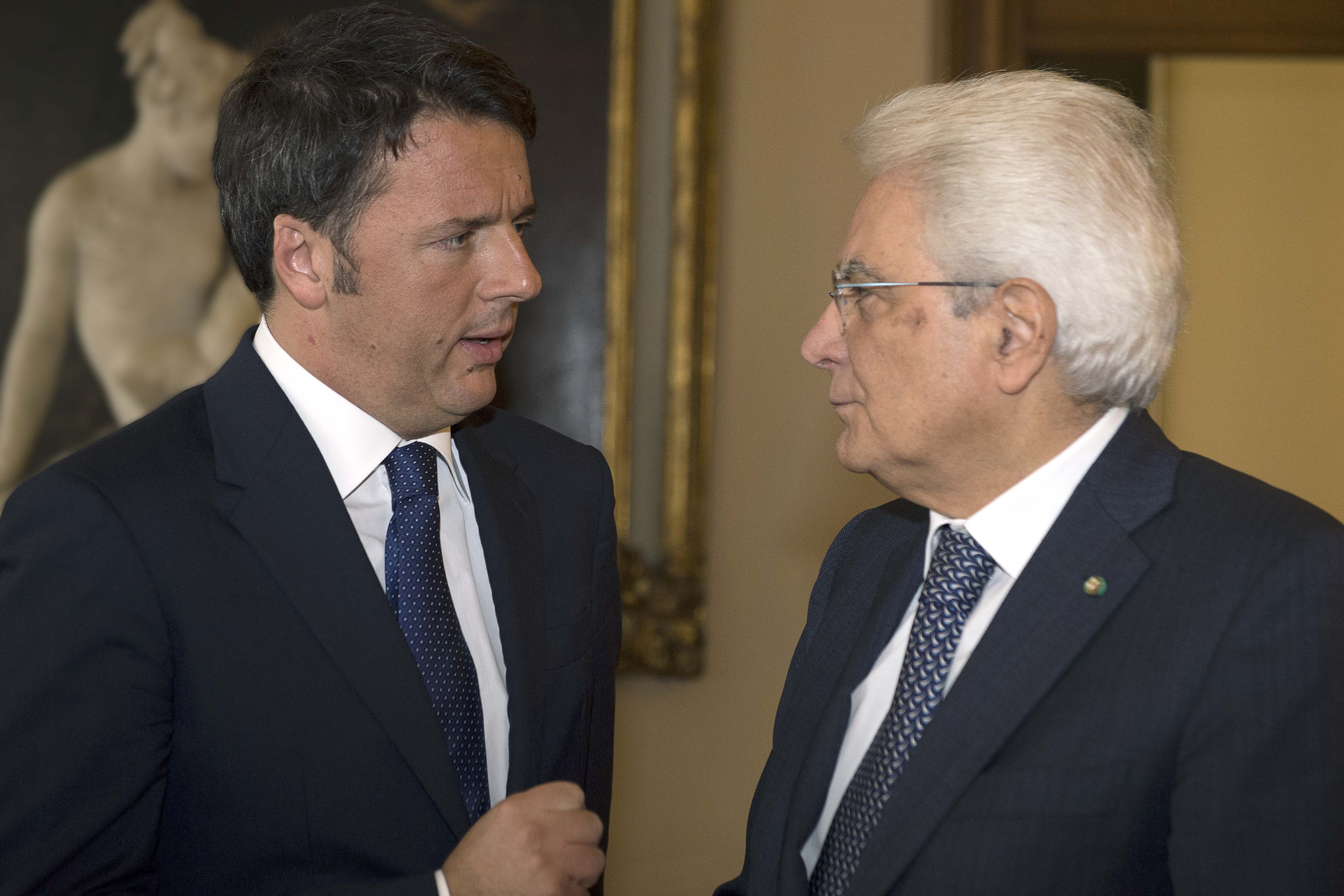
Renzi speaking with President Sergio Mattarella in 2015

Giorgio Napolitano announced his immediate retirement as President of Italy on 14 January 2015. Napolitano had been convinced to stand again as president following the political uncertainty generated by the 2013 Italian general election but had made it clear he would retire at some point before June 2015. During the National Assembly of the PD on 29 January, Renzi officially announced that he would endorse Sergio Mattarella, a judge on the Constitutional Court of Italy and a former Minister of Defence, as his candidate for the Italian presidential election to replace Napolitano.

It had been thought, due to the high threshold a candidate requires in the first three rounds of balloting in a presidential election, that Renzi would be forced to seek a compromise candidate with Silvio Berlusconi; however, despite Berlusconi's stringent opposition to Mattarella, Renzi instructed the PD to abstain from the first three rounds of balloting in an attempt to force a fourth ballot which required a far lower threshold for victory. Despite the risk this strategy involved, centrist parties announced at the last moment that they would support Mattarella on the fourth ballot, and he subsequently won the presidential election with 665 votes out of 1,009 from senators and deputies. Renzi was able to secure his chosen candidate's election by also unexpectedly securing last-minute support from the conservative New Centre-Right, the socialist Left Ecology Freedom, and the liberal Civic Choice.

=== 2016 Italian constitutional referendum ===
Basta un Sì ("Just a Yes") logo chosen to support the reform

After constitutional reforms had passed both the Chamber of Deputies and the Senate of the Republic multiple times, Renzi announced that he would hold a constitutional referendum on 4 December 2016 to seek approval for the changes; whilst the reform was approved by a simple parliamentary majority, it did not achieve the two-thirds necessary to avoid a referendum, as per Article 138 of the Constitution of Italy.

Voters were asked whether they approved of amending the constitution to transform the Senate into a "Senate of Regions", with 100 members made up of regional councillors and mayors of large cities, akin to the Bundesrat of Germany. The reform would have reduced the size of the Senate from 315 to 100, making all senators indirectly elected by regional councils and mayors. The reform would have made it harder for the Senate to veto legislation. Following early results which indicated that the "No" side was clearly ahead, Renzi conceded defeat and resigned.

=== 2018 Italian general election ===
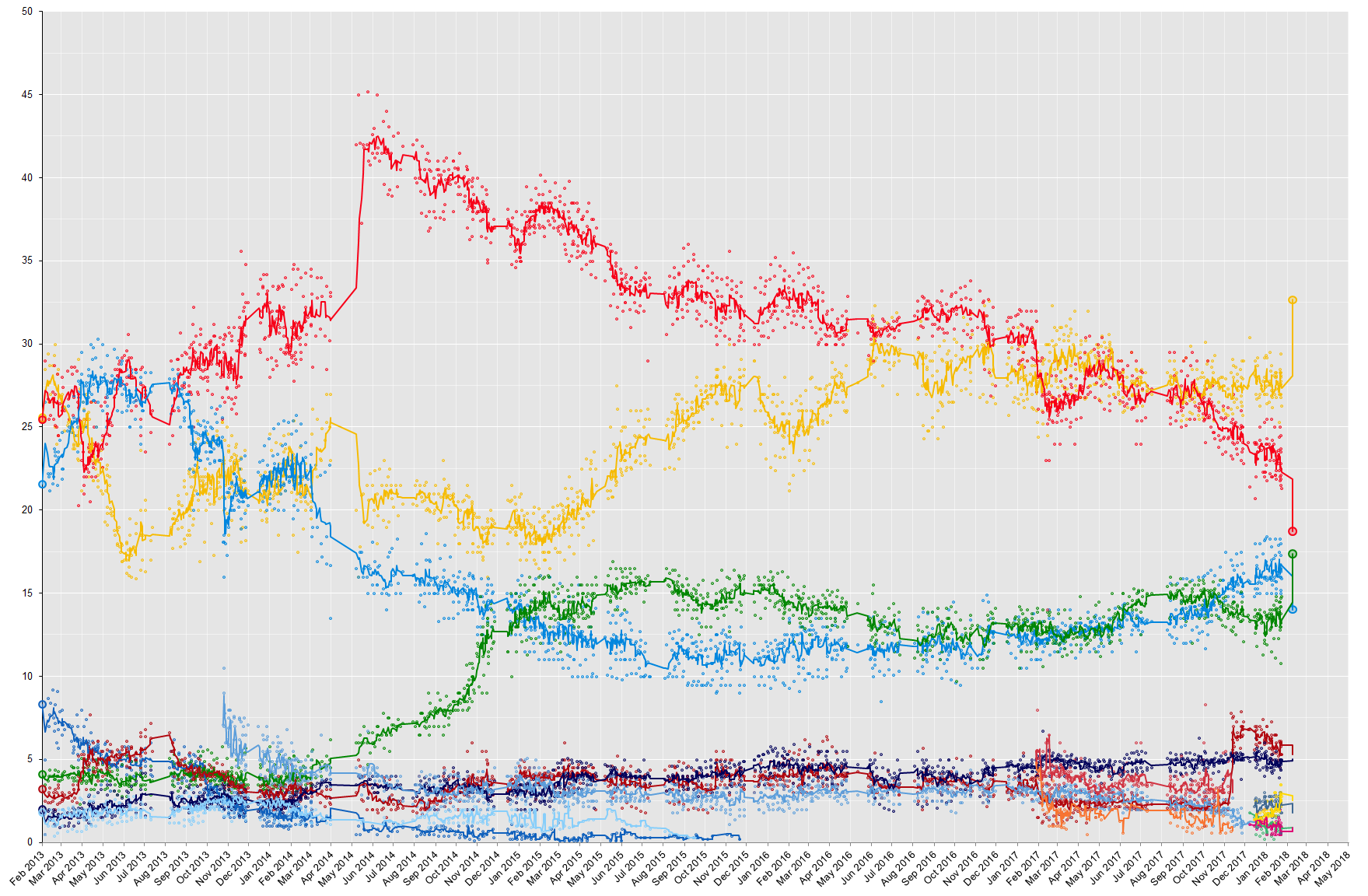
Rise and fall of the Democratic Party (represented in red) from 2013 to 2018

The 2018 Italian general election was held on 4 March after the Italian Parliament was dissolved by President Sergio Mattarella on 28 December 2017.

Renzi led a centre-left coalition composed by the Democratic Party (PD), the liberal More Europe of Emma Bonino, the centrist Popular Civic List of Beatrice Lorenzin, and the progressive Together of Giulio Santagata. The centre-left was affected by a political schism, when many members of PD's left-wing faction, like Bersani, D'Alema, and Speranza, left the party founding another movement, known as MDP, which run under the joint list Free and Equal led by Pietro Grasso.

In the election, the centre-right coalition, in which Matteo Salvini's League emerged as the main political, won a plurality of seats in the Chamber of Deputies and in the Senate with 37.0% of votes, while the anti-establishment Five Star Movement led by Luigi Di Maio became the party with the largest number of votes (32.7%). Renzi's centre-left coalition came only third with 22.9% of votes; however, no political group or party won an outright majority, resulting in a hung parliament.

== Political views ==
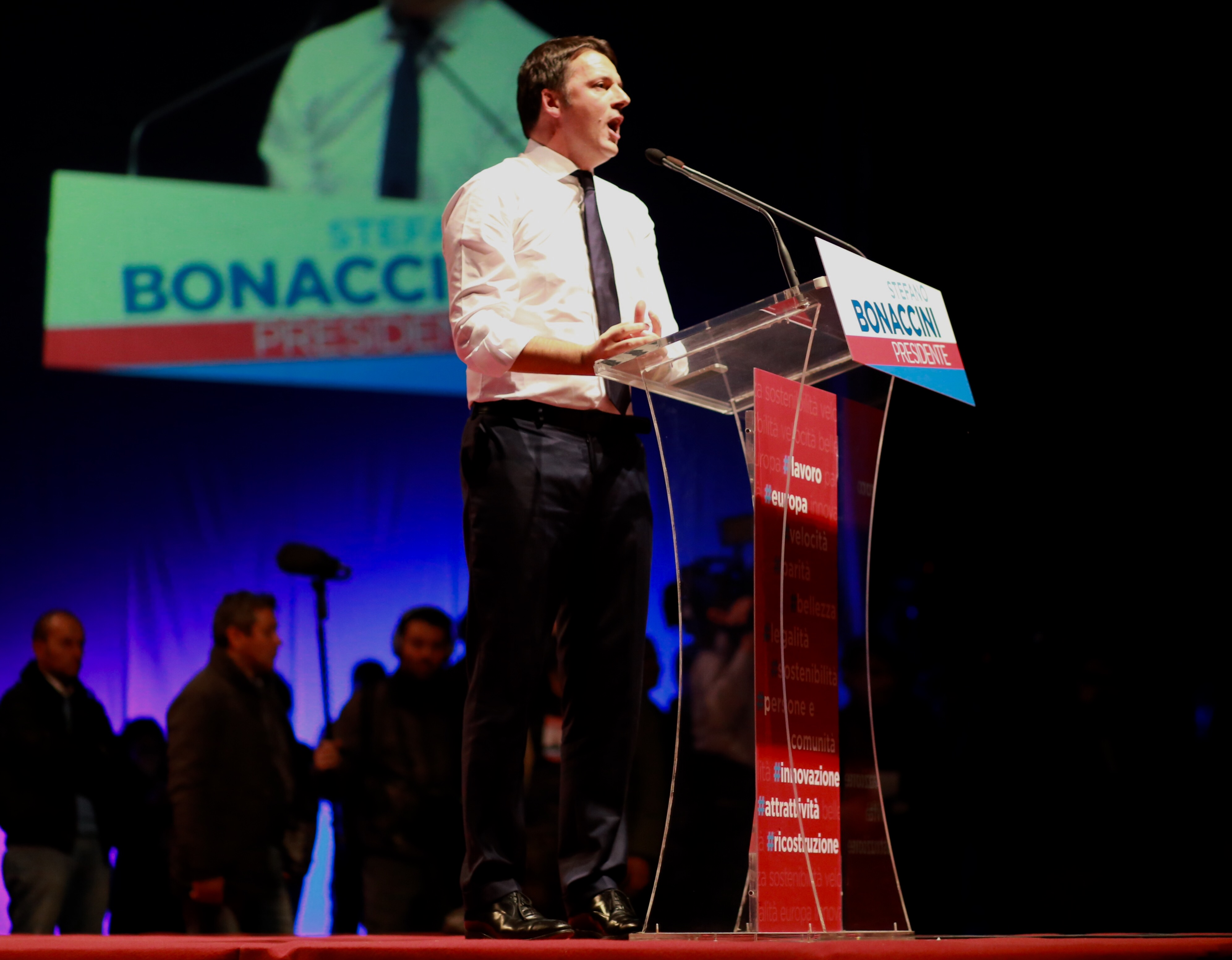
Renzi speaking during a PD rally in Bologna

The nature of Renzi's progressivism is a matter of debate and has been linked both to liberalism and populism. According to Maria Teresa Meli of the Corriere della Sera, Renzi "pursues a precise model, borrowed from the British Labour Party and Bill Clinton's Democratic Party", comprising "a strange mix (for Italy) of liberal policy in the economic sphere and populism. This means that, on one side, he will attack the privileges of trade unions, especially of the CGIL, which defends only the already protected, while, on the other, he will sharply attack the vested powers, bankers, Confindustria and a certain type of capitalism."

The Daily Telegraph referred to Renzi as "a prominent centrist voice in Europe". Renzi has occasionally been compared to former British prime minister Tony Blair for his political views. Renzi himself has previously cited Blair as an inspiration for him, and said to be a supporter of Blair's ideology of the Third Way, which attempts to synthesise liberal economics and left-wing social policies. In an interview with the Italian talk show Che tempo che fa, Renzi stated that his meeting with Bill Clinton and Hillary Clinton was the most interesting part of his trip to the United States because he considered them as models of the reformist left. Renzi endorsed the Hillary Clinton 2016 presidential campaign in an interview where he also expressed admiration for the policies of Bill Clinton and Barack Obama.

Renzi is in favour of the recognition of civil unions for same-sex couples and stepchild adoptions, a situation which occurs when at least one parent has children from a previous relationship that are not genetically related to the other parent. For this, Renzi was criticised by the participants of the Family Day, an anti-LGBT demonstration which took place three times in Italy; the Prime Minister was accused of having changed his opinion about the recognition of same-sex couples. Renzi participated in the first Family Day in 2007, while he was president of Florence province and a member of the centrist The Daisy party.

Renzi was sometimes described as the de facto leader of the centre-left Party of European Socialists, in opposition to the centre-right European People's Party associated with Angela Merkel; the two leaders were together often referred to as Merkenzi.

== Public image ==
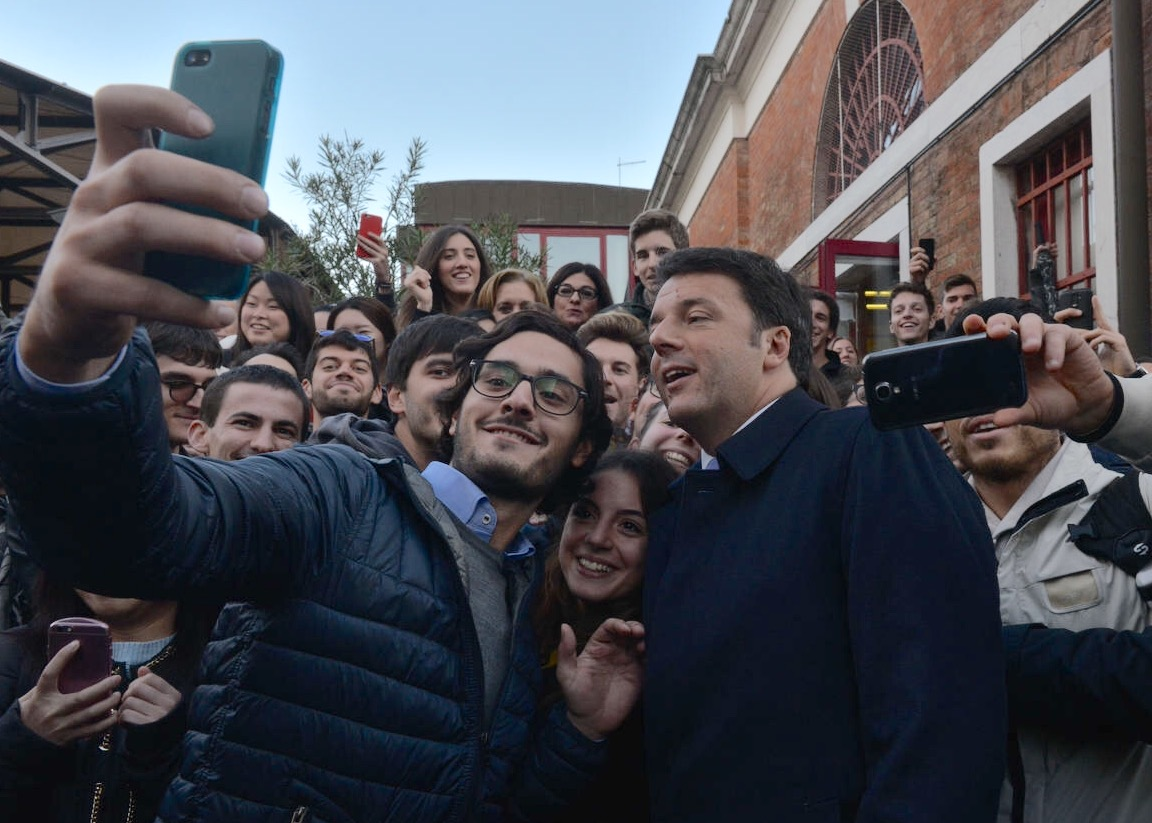
Renzi taking a selfie with some supporters in Venice

According to public opinion surveys in May 2014, just after the European Parliament elections, Renzi's approval rating was 74%, the highest ever rating for an Italian politician serving as Prime Minister; the highest absolute consensus at 84% was recorded in November 2011 by Mario Monti, who presided over a technical, bipartisan government. His lowest approval in office was in June 2015, with just over 35%; upon leaving the office of Prime Minister, his approval rating further shrank to 15% by April 2020.

In the 2010s, Italy underwent a wave of populism and post-modern leadership likened to Renzi's style. As a "master of telepolitics", Renzi used his own skills and accomplishments as evidence of his ability to lead, promoted the Internet as a platform for democracy, and used heavy emotional appeals along with relatable, persuasive language to advocate for his positions. In 2014, Renzi was ranked as the third most influential person in the world under 40 in the 40 Under 40 list by Fortune, and in the FP Top 100 Global Thinkers by Foreign Policy. Both as prime minister and mayor of Florence, Renzi has been renowned as an assiduous user of social networks, especially Twitter, where he is followed by more than two million people. Renzi's use of social networks was a contributing factor to his victory in the 2013 PD leadership election.

Renzi has stated that he is a fan of the American TV series House of Cards; some journalists, including the book's author Michael Dobbs and Enrico Letta, noted similarities between the rise to power of the character Francis Underwood, played by Kevin Spacey, and the manner in which Renzi replaced Letta as prime minister in 2014. This comparison surfaced in the media again in June 2015, when a phone conversation from January 2014 between Renzi and a general of the Guardia di Finanza, Michele Adinolfi, was leaked to Il Fatto Quotidiano. During the conversation, Renzi described Letta as "incapable" and told Adinolfi that he would replace him as prime minister, which would happen less than a month later. In October 2016, Renzi stated to have stopped watching the TV series after its second season. After Letta retired from politics in 2015, he came back to accept the PD leadership in March 2021, about one year and a half after Renzi left the PD and his new party was struggling at the polls.

In December 2018, Renzi presented a TV series called Firenze secondo me ("Florence According to Me"), broadcast by Nove TV channel. It is a historical and artistic documentary, in which Renzi presents the city of Florence, narrating historical events and showing the most famous sites of cultural interest, like Palazzo Vecchio, the Uffizi Gallery, the Vasari Corridor, the Basilica of Santa Croce, Palazzo Pitti, and the Boboli Gardens.

In February 2022, the Florence Prosecutors' office requested a trial of eleven suspects, among them Renzi, for alleged funding irregularities related to Renzi's Open Foundation. Alongside his consultations in Saudi Arabia, for which he received €1.1 million and was criticized due to praising Saudi Arabia's cheap labour costs and referring to it as a "New Renaissance", Renzi's public image suffered and he received criticism from Saudi dissident Sa'ad Al-Faqih.

== Personal life ==
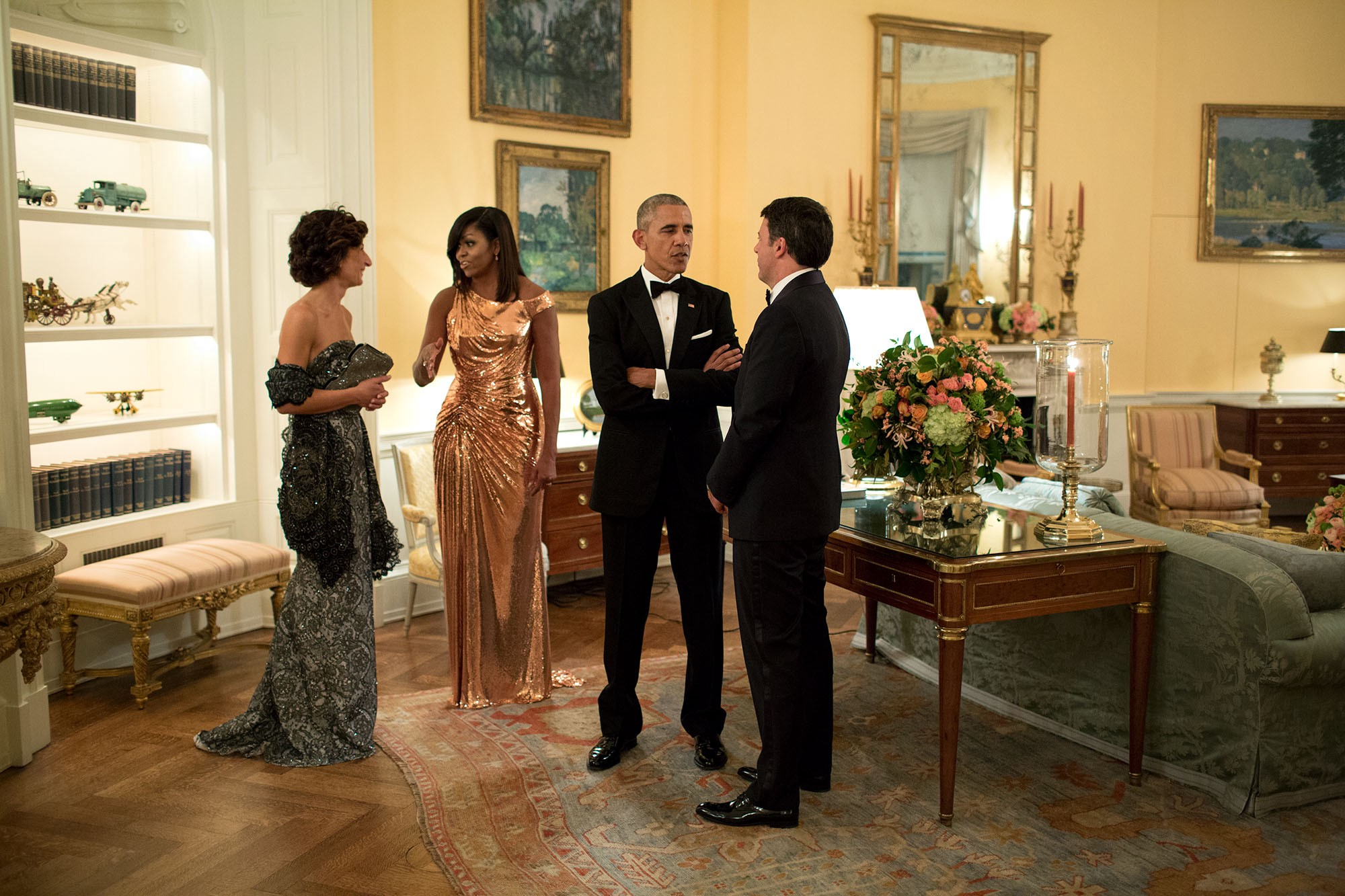
Renzi and his wife Agnese Landini with Barack Obama and his wife Michelle Obama at the White House in October 2016

In 1999, Renzi married Agnese Landini, a teacher, with whom he has three children: two sons, Francesco and Emanuele, and a daughter, Ester. The Renzi family are regular Mass-goers and are active in the Association of Italian Catholic Guides and Scouts, the largest Scouting association in Italy. In addition to his native Italian, Renzi can also speak French and some English. He is an avid football fan and supports ACF Fiorentina, the team of his hometown Florence.

At the 2014 Italian local elections, his sister Benedetta was elected a municipal councillor for the PD in Castenaso, a small town near Bologna. Renzi's father Tiziano was the city secretary of the PD for Rignano sull'Arno, near Florence, until March 2017; he was previously a municipal councillor for Christian Democracy from 1985 to 1990.

Since 2018, Matteo Renzi's speaking engagements, particularly in the Gulf monarchies, have been a major part of his schedule. He declared income from this activity of over 800,000 euros in 2018 and over a million in 2019. In 2020, he joins the board of directors of the Future Investment Initiative Institute, a think tank financed by Saudi Arabia, with an annual remuneration of 80,000 euros.

In 2022 he admitted to be a close friend and personal advisor of Mohammed bin Salman.

In March 2026 Renzi told that he had been diagnosed with melanoma a short time before, and that the removal surgery had been a success; then launched an appeal for the prevention of this disease.

== Electoral history ==
Election	House	Constituency	Party	Votes	Result
2018	Senate of the Republic	Florence	PD	109,830	Elected
2022	Senate of the Republic	Campania	A–IV	– (Note: Elected in a closed list proportional representation system.)	Elected

=== First-past-the-post elections ===
2018 general election (S): Florence
Candidate	Party	Votes	%
Matteo Renzi	Centre-left coalition	109,830	43.9
Alberto Bagnai	Centre-right coalition	61,642	24.6
Nicola Cecchi	Five Star Movement	49,925	19.9
Others		28,797	11.4
Total		256,879	100.0

== Authored books ==
- Ma le giubbe rosse non uccisero Aldo Moro. La politica spiegata a mio fratello. Florence: Giunti. 1999. ISBN 88-09-01483-9.
- Tra De Gasperi e gli U2. I trentenni e il futuro. Florence: Giunti. 2006. ISBN 88-09-04793-1.
- A viso aperto. Florence: Polistampa. 2008. ISBN 978-88-596-0448-8.
- "La mi' Firenze". 1949–2009. Florence: Polistampa. 2010. ISBN 978-88-596-0755-7.
- Fuori!. Milan: Rizzoli. 2011. ISBN 978-88-17-04899-6.
- Stil Novo. La rivoluzione della bellezza tra Dante e Twitter. Milan: Rizzoli. 2012. ISBN 978-88-17-05642-7.
- Oltre la rottamazione. Milan: Mondadori. 2013. ISBN 978-88-04-63298-6.
- Avanti. Perché l'Italia non si ferma. Milan: Feltrinelli. 2017. ISBN 978-88-07-17313-4.
- Un'altra strada: idee per l'Italia di domani. Venice: Marsilio. 2019. ISBN 978-88-297-0140-7.
- La mossa del cavallo. Come ricominciare, insieme. Venice: Marsilio. 2020. ISBN 978-88-297-0669-3.

== See also ==
- Liberalism in Europe

Political offices
Preceded by Michele Gesualdi	President of the Province of Florence; 2004–2009	Succeeded by Andrea Barducci
Preceded by Leonardo Domenici	Mayor of Florence; 2009–2014	Succeeded by Dario Nardella
Preceded by Enrico Letta	Prime Minister of Italy; 2014–2016	Succeeded by Paolo Gentiloni
Party political offices
Preceded by Guglielmo Epifani	Secretary of the Democratic Party; 2013–2017	Succeeded by Matteo Orfini
Preceded by Matteo Orfini	Secretary of the Democratic Party; 2017–2018	Succeeded by Maurizio Martina
New political party	Leader of Italia Viva; 2019–present	Incumbent
