= Giorgio Morales =

Italian politician (1932–2020)

Mayor of Florence
- In office 2 October 1989 – 24 April 1995
- Preceded by: Massimo Bogianckino
- Succeeded by: Mario Primicerio

Personal details
- Born: 26 March 1932 La Spezia, Italy
- Died: 29 November 2020 (aged 88) Florence, Italy
- Party: UP (till 1957); PSI (1957-1994); FI (1995-1999); SDI (1999-2007); PSI (2007-2020)

Giorgio Morales (26 March 1932 – 29 November 2020) was an Italian politician who served as Mayor of Florence from 1989 to 1995.

== Career ==
Morales began his political life at a very early age, first joining the Popular Unity (UP) party and then in 1957 becoming a member of the Italian Socialist Party (PSI). After graduating in Political Science from the Cesare Alfieri Institute of the University of Florence, in 1970 he was appointed coordinator of the Legislative Office of the Regional Council.

He was elected municipal councilor in Florence, serving without interruption between 1975 and 1989. On the council he was given the decentralization portfolio in 1975, alongside Mayor Elio Gabbuggiani, then became deputy mayor from 1979 to 1983. He was the councilor responsible for culture under mayors Alessandro Bonsanti, Lando Conti, and Massimo Bogianckino.

Morales was elected Mayor of Florence twice: in 1989 he succeeded Bogianckino, supported by the PSI, PCI, PSDI, and PLI; then in 1990 he formed a Pentapartito junta, composed of the DC, PSI, PSDI, PRI, and PLI. He ran again for the office of Mayor in 1995, supported by Forza Italia (FI) and the Italian People's Party (PPI), but was defeated by the centre-left Independent candidate Mario Primicerio. From 1995 to 1999 he again sat on the city council.

Giorgio Morales was an advocate for culture with a passion for refined wines and art books. When Valdo Spini was the first candidate to be considered as mayor of Florence, it was Bettino Craxi who recommended Morales as an alternative, believing that having the left-wing Spini as mayor would set a dangerous precedent for following alliances.

Morales, along with the entire city council, resigned from governing Florence in 1990 amidst a time of racial strains and anti-immigration, shortly after a violent attack on African immigrants. Immediately prior to Morales' resignation, members of his coalition were unsupportive of his supposed desire to “militarize” downtown Florence, a popular tourist location. The task force would have been in place to combat deterioration of the historic center and prevent violence, as well as other crimes such as vandalism and sexual assaults. Upon leaving, Morales expressed his contentment with additional efforts to control racist attacks and crime in Florence. Morales had managed to receive police support from Rome during his time in office, which some citizens in Florence regarded as “Florence Besieged” (William Montalbano).

Political offices
Preceded by Massimo Bogianckino	Mayor of Florence; 1989–1995	Succeeded by Mario Primicerio
