= Francesco Guicciardini (politician, born 1851) =

Italian politician

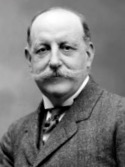
- Francesco Guicciardini
- Born: 5 October 1851; Florence, Grand Duchy of Tuscany
- Died: 1 September 1915 (aged 63); Florence, Kingdom of Italy
- Occupation: politician

Francesco Guicciardini (5 October 1851 – 1 September 1915) was an Italian politician. He was born in Florence. He served as minister of agriculture, commerce and industry from 1896 to 1897 in the cabinet of Prime Minister Antonio Starabba, Marchese di Rudinì. He served as Foreign Minister of the Kingdom of Italy in the cabinets of Prime Minister Sidney Sonnino.

== See also ==
- List of Italians

Preceded by Piero Torrigiani	Mayor of Florence; 1889–1890	Succeeded by Piero Torrigiani
Preceded by Antonino Paternò Castello	Foreign Minister of the Kingdom of Italy; February–May 1906	Succeeded by Tommaso Tittoni
Preceded by Tommaso Tittoni	Foreign Minister of the Kingdom of Italy; 1909–1910	Succeeded by Antonino Paternò Castello
