= Mayor of Florence =

- Sindaco di Firenze
- Coat of arms of Florence

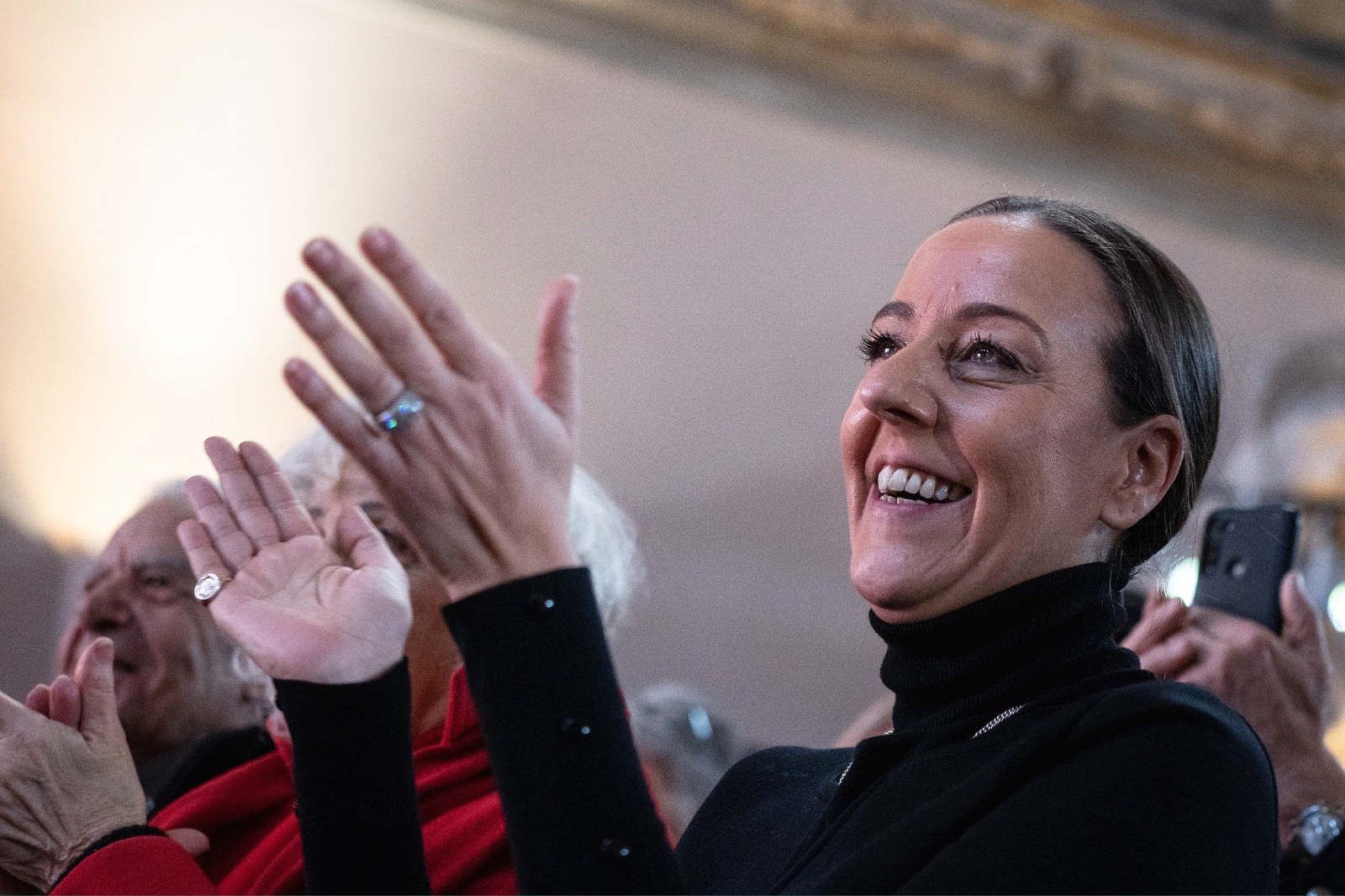
- Incumbent; Sara Funaro since 26 June 2024
- Style: No title or style
- Seat: Palazzo Vecchio
- Appointer: Electorate of Florence
- Term length: 5 years, renewable once
- Inaugural holder: Luigi Guglielmo Cambray-Digny
- Formation: 27 April 1859
- Deputy: Paola Galgani
- Salary: €145,272
- Website: Official website

The mayor of Florence (Italian: sindaco di Firenze) is an elected politician who, along with the Florence City Council of 36 members, is accountable for the strategic government of Florence. The title is the equivalent of Lord Mayor in the meaning of an actual executive leader. The office of Gonfaloniere was created in 1781 by Leopold II, Grand Duke of Tuscany. It was replaced by the office of mayor in 1865, during the early Kingdom of Italy. The incumbent mayor of Florence is Sara Funaro of the Democratic Party, who was elected on 23–24 June 2024.

== Overview ==
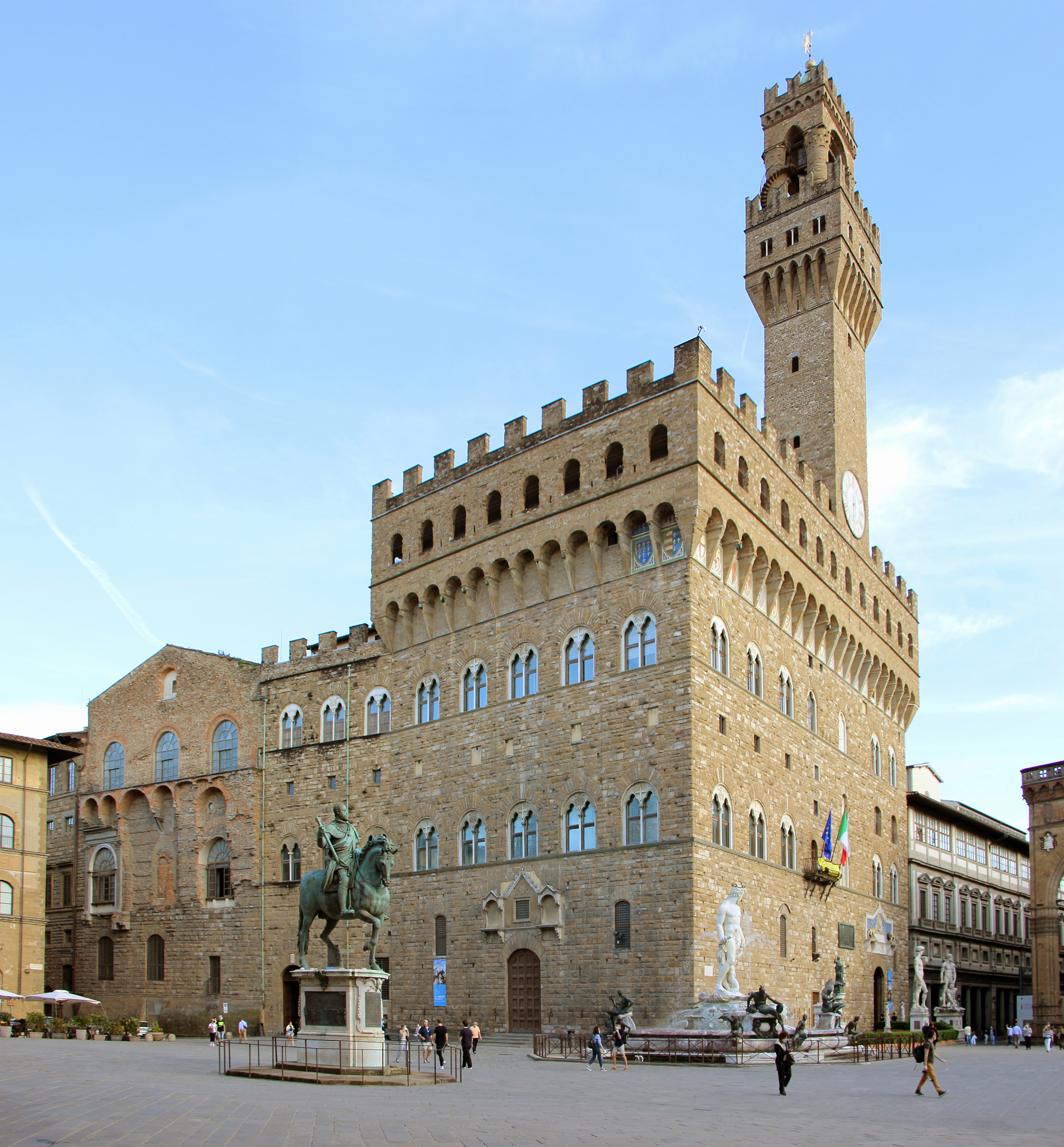
Palazzo Vecchio is the seat of the mayor of Florence.

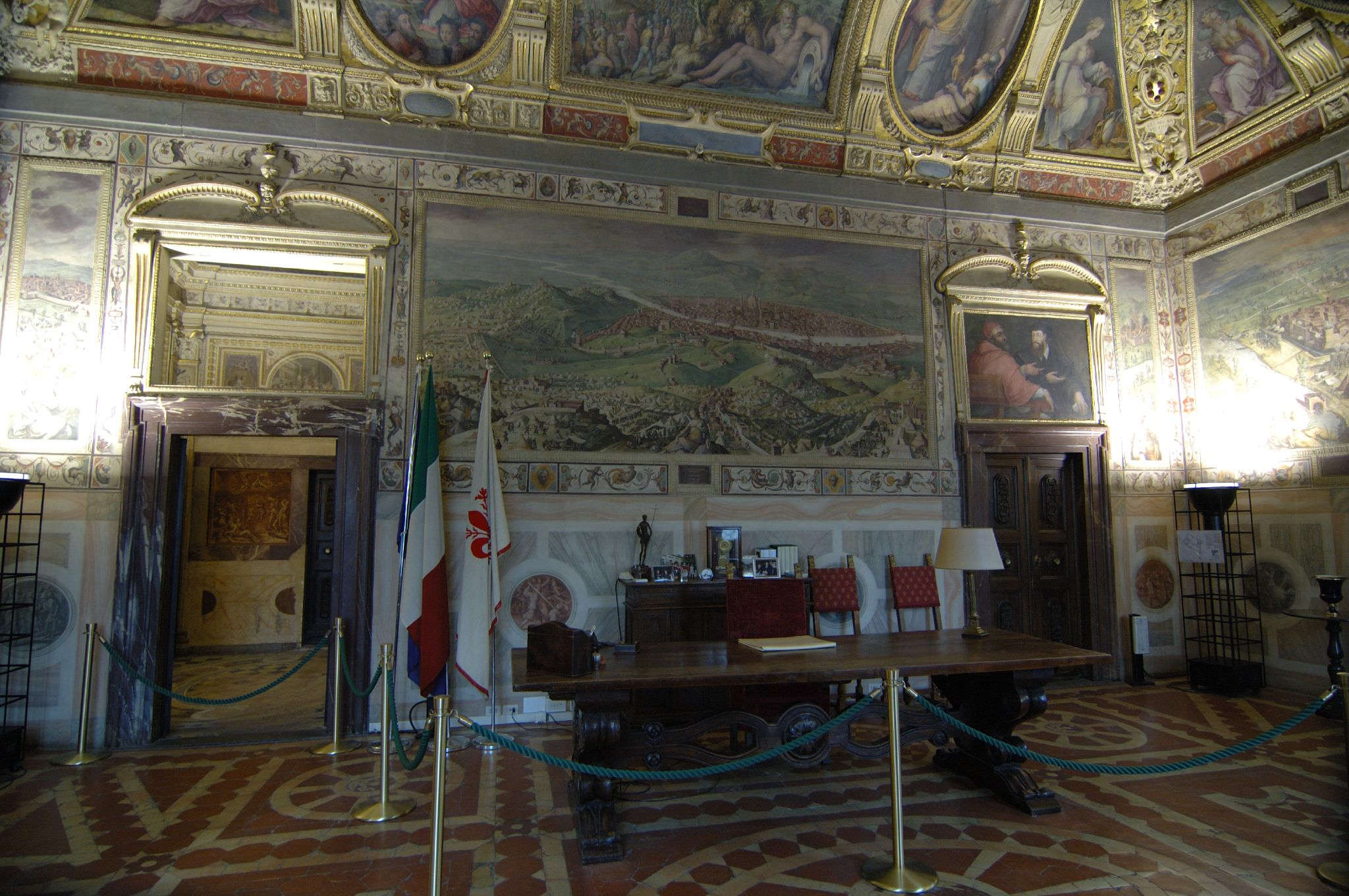
The office of the mayor of Florence is located in the famous Sala di Clemente VII.

According to the Italian Constitution, the mayor of Florence is member of Florence's city council. The title of mayor is not held by the heads of the five boroughs of Florence because they do not actually preside over self-governmental municipalities, and instead is elected by the population of Florence. Citizens also elect the members of the Florence City Council, which also controls the mayor's policy guidelines and is able to enforce his resignation by a motion of no confidence. The mayor is entitled to appoint and release the members of his government.

Since 1995, the mayor is elected directly by Florence's electorate. In all mayoral elections in Italy in cities with a population higher than 15,000 the voters express a direct choice for the mayor or an indirect choice voting for the party of the candidate's coalition. If no candidate receives at least 50% of votes, the top two candidates go to a second round after two weeks. The election of the city council is based on a direct choice for the candidate with a preference vote: the candidate with the majority of the preferences is elected. The number of the seats for each party is determined proportionally. The seat of the city council is the city hall Palazzo Vecchio in Piazza della Signoria.

== List of mayors of Florence (1781–present) ==
=== Grand Duchy of Tuscany (1781–1859) ===
In 1781 was created the office of Annual Gonfaloniere of Florence who was appointed by the Grand Duke of Tuscany every year.

- 1781–1783 – Giuseppe Maria Panzanini
- 1783–1784 – Francesco Catellini da Castiglione
- 1784–1785 – Giovan Giorgio Ugolini
- 1785–1786 – Maldonato Amadio d'Alma
- 1786–1787 – Alberto Rimbotti
- 1787–1788 – Giuseppe Baldovinetti di Poggio
- 1788–1789 – Giuseppe Arnaldi
- 1789–1790 – Alberto Rimbotti
- 1790–1791 – Miniato Miniati
- 1791–1792 – Pietro Baldigiani
- 1792–1793 – Ferdinando de' Bardi
- 1793–1794 – Pietro Soderini
- 1794–1795 – Antonio da Castiglione
- 1795–1796 – Francesco Passerini
- 1796–1797 – Vieri De' Cerchi
- 1797–1798 – Ottavio Pitti
- 1798–1799 – Leonardo Buonarroti
- 1799–1800 – Orazio Smeraldo Morelli
- 1800–1801 – Francesco Catellini da Castiglione
- 1801–1802 – Niccolò Arrighi
- 1802–1803 – Michele Roti
- 1803–1804 – Pietro Mancini
- 1804–1805 – Giovanni Carlo Mori Ubaldini
- 1805–1806 – Giulio Orlandini
- 1806–1807 – Vespasiano Marzichi
- 1807–1808 – Tommaso Guadagni
- 1808–1809 – Filippo Guadagni

In 1809, during the period of the newborn Kingdom of Etruria, it was temporarily created the office of Maire of Florence.

- 1809–1813 – Emilio Pucci
- 1813–1815 – Girolamo Bartolommei

In 1815, the office of Gonfaloniere of Florence was restored.

- 1815–1816 – Giovanni Battista Gondi
- 1816–1817 – Giovanni Rosselli de Turco
- 1817–1821 – Tommaso Corsi
- 1821–1825 – Jacopo Guidi
- 1826–1828 – Giovanni Battista Covoni
- 1829–1831 – Giovanni Battista Andrea Boubon del Monte
- 1832–1834 – Cosimo Antinori
- 1835–1840 – Gaetano de' Pazzi
- 1841–1842 – Luigi de Cambray Digny
- 1843–1846 – Pier Francesco Rinuccini
- 1847 – Vincenzo Peruzzi
- 1847–1848 – Bettino Ricasoli
- 1848–1850 – Ubaldino Peruzzi
- 1850 – Carlo Torrigiani
- 1850–1853 – Vincenzo Capponi
- 1854–1859 – Eduardo Dufour Berté

=== Kingdom of Italy (1861–1946) ===
In 1865, the Kingdom of Italy created the office of the Mayor of Florence (Sindaco di Firenze), chosen by the City council. In 1926, the Fascist dictatorship abolished mayors and City councils, replacing them with an authoritarian podestà chosen by the National Fascist Party.

	Mayor	Term start	Term end	Party
–	Ferdinando Bartolommei (Note: Gonfaloniere appointed by the King) (1821–1869)	27 April 1859	10 October 1863	Independent
Acting councillor Giulio Carobbi (10 October 1863 – 31 December 1864)
Mayors appointed by the King (1865–1889)
1	Luigi Guglielmo Cambray-Digny (Note: Gonfaloniere from January 1865 to September 1865) (1820–1906)	1 January 1865	27 October 1867	Independent
Acting councillor Giuseppe Garzoni (27 October 1867 – 5 March 1869)
2	Lorenzo Ginori Lisci (1823–1878)	5 March 1869	29 October 1869	Right
3	Ubaldino Peruzzi (1822–1891)	29 October 1869	15 May 1878	Right
Acting councillors (15 May 1878 – 27 January 1880)
4	Tommaso Corsini (1835–1919)	27 January 1880	30 March 1886	Right
5	Piero Torrigiani (1846–1920)	14 April 1886	14 November 1889	Right
Mayors elected by the City Council (1889–1926)
6	Francesco Guicciardini (1851–1915)	14 November 1889	15 December 1890	Right
Acting councillor Gaspare Gloria (15 December 1890 – 4 February 1891)
(5)	Piero Torrigiani (1846–1920)	4 February 1891	2 January 1901	Right
Acting councillor Antonio Artimini (2 January 1901 – 8 October 1902)
7	Silvio Berti (1856–1930)	8 October 1902	21 July 1903	Right
Acting councillors (21 July 1903 – 15 March 1904)
8	Ippolito Niccolini (1848–1919)	15 March 1904	26 June 1907	Right
9	Francesco Sangiorgi (1860–19?)	30 July 1907	12 August 1909	Left
10	Giulio Chiarugi (1859–1944)	12 August 1909	12 December 1910	Left
11	Filippo Corsini (1873–1926)	12 December 1910	21 November 1913	Liberal
Acting councillors (21 November 1913 – 23 February 1915)
12	Orazio Bacci (1864–1917)	23 February 1915	25 December 1917 (Note: Died in office)	Liberal
13	Pier Francesco Serragli (18?–1938)	25 December 1917	30 January 1919	Liberal
Acting councillors (30 January 1919 – 30 November 1920)
14	Antonio Garbasso (1871–1933)	1 December 1920	15 January 1927	Fascist
Fascist Podestà (1927–1944)
1	Antonio Garbasso (1871–1933)	16 January 1927	22 September 1928	PNF
2	Giuseppe della Gherardesca (1876–1968)	22 September 1928	12 December 1933	PNF
3	Paolo Venerosi Pesciolini (1896–1964)	12 December 1933	8 August 1943	PNF
Special Prefectural Commissioner tenure (8 August 1943 – 14 February 1944)
4	Giotto Dainelli Dolfi (1878–1968)	14 February 1944	11 August 1944	PFR
Allied occupation (1944–1946)
15	Gaetano Pieraccini (1864–1957)	11 August 1944	28 November 1946	Socialist

=== Republic of Italy (1946–present) ===
==== City Council election (1946–1995) ====
From 1946 to 1995, the mayor of Florence was chosen by the city council.

	Mayor	Term start	Term end	Party	Coalition	Election
1	Mario Fabiani (1902–1974)	29 November 1946	5 July 1951	PCI	PCI • PSI • PRI • PdA	1946
2	Giorgio La Pira (1904–1977)	5 July 1951	3 August 1956	DC	DC • PRI • PSDI	1951
2	Giorgio La Pira (1904–1977)	3 August 1956	27 June 1957	DC	DC • PRI • PSDI	1956
-	Special Prefectural Commissioner tenure (27 June 1957–7 March 1961) (Note: Nominated by the prefect after the City Council failed to elect a mayor. The commissioner held the office for nearly 4 years. This tenure is still today one of the longest in the history of the Italian Republic.)					
(2)	Giorgio La Pira (1904–1977)	7 March 1961	15 February 1965	DC	DC • PSI • PRI • PSDI	1960
3	Lelio Lagorio (1925–2017)	15 February 1965	19 November 1965	PSI	DC • PSI • PRI • PSDI	1964
-	Special Prefectural Commissioner tenure (19 November 1965–1 August 1966) (Note: Nominated by the prefect after the City Council failed to elect a new mayor)					
4	Piero Bargellini (1897–1980)	1 August 1966	3 November 1967	DC	DC • PRI • PSDI	1966
5	Luciano Bausi (1921–1995)	3 November 1967	29 April 1969	DC	DC • PRI • PSDI	1966
-	Special Prefectural Commissioner tenure (29 April 1969–15 September 1970) (Note: Nominated by the prefect after the City Council failed to elect a new mayor)					
(5)	Luciano Bausi (1921–1995)	15 September 1970	12 September 1974	DC	DC • PSI • PSDI	1970
6	Giancarlo Zoli (1917–2007)	12 September 1974	19 October 1974	DC	DC • PSI • PSDI	1970
-	Special Prefectural Commissioner tenure (19 October 1974–26 July 1975) (Note: Nominated by the prefect after the City Council failed to elect a new mayor)					
7	Elio Gabbuggiani (1925–1999)	26 July 1975	5 August 1980	PCI	PCI • PSI • PRI	1975
7	Elio Gabbuggiani (1925–1999)	5 August 1980	14 March 1983	PCI	PCI • PSI • PRI • PSDI	1980
8	Alessandro Bonsanti (1904–1984)	14 March 1983	18 February 1984 (Note: Died in office)	PRI	DC • PSI • PRI • PSDI • PLI	1980
9	Lando Conti (1933–1986)	26 March 1984	26 September 1985	PRI	DC • PSI • PRI • PSDI • PLI	1980
10	Massimo Bogianckino (1922–2009)	26 September 1985	2 October 1989	PSI	PCI • PSI • PSDI	1985
11	Giorgio Morales (1932–2020)	2 October 1989	18 July 1990	PSI	PCI • PSI • PSDI • PLI	1985
11	Giorgio Morales (1932–2020)	18 July 1990	24 April 1995	PSI	DC • PSI • PSDI	1990

==== Direct election (since 1995) ====
Since 1995, enacting a new law on local administrations (1993), the mayor of Florence is chosen by direct election, originally every four, and since 1999 every five years.

	Mayor	Took office	Left office	Party	Coalition	Election
12	Mario Primicerio (1940–2025)	24 April 1995	14 June 1999	Ind	The Olive Tree (PDS-PRC-FdV-FL)	1995
13	Leonardo Domenici (born 1955)	14 June 1999	28 June 2004	DS; PD	The Olive Tree (DS-PdCI-FdV-Dem-PPI-SDI)	1999
13	Leonardo Domenici (born 1955)	28 June 2004	22 June 2009	DS; PD	The Olive Tree (DS-PdCI-FdV-DL-SDI)	2004
14	Matteo Renzi (born 1975)	22 June 2009	24 March 2014 (Note: Resigned after swearing as Prime Minister of Italy. He was replaced by the deputy mayor Dario Nardella until a new municipal election was held.)	PD	PD • IdV • SEL	2009
15	Dario Nardella (born 1975)	26 May 2014	29 May 2019	PD	PD	2014
15	Dario Nardella (born 1975)	29 May 2019	26 June 2024	PD	PD	2019
16	Sara Funaro (born 1976)	26 June 2024	Incumbent	PD	PD • AVS	2024

==== By time in office ====
Rank	Mayor	Political Party	Total time in office	Terms
1	Dario Nardella	PD	10 years, 31 days	2
2	Leonardo Domenici	DS/PD	10 years, 8 days	2
3	Giorgio La Pira	DC	9 years, 283 days	3
4	Elio Gabbuggiani	PCI	7 years, 231 days	2
5	Giorgio Morales	PSI	5 years, 204 days	2
6	Luciano Bausi	DC	5 years, 148 days	2
7	Matteo Renzi	PD	4 years, 275 days	1
8	Mario Fabiani	PCI	4 years, 218 days	1
9	Mario Primicerio	None	4 years, 51 days	1
10	Massimo Bogianckino	PSI	4 years, 6 days	1
11	Sara Funaro	PD	2 years, 105 days	1
12	Lando Conti	PRI	1 year, 184 days	1
13	Piero Bargellini	DC	1 year, 94 days	1
14	Alessandro Bonsanti	PRI	1 year, 12 days	1
15	Lelio Lagorio	PSI	277 days	1
16	Giancarlo Zoli	DC	37 days	1

== Elections ==
=== City Council elections, 1946–1990 ===
Results

Number of votes for each party:

Election	DC	PCI	PSI	PLI	PRI	PSDI	MSI	Others	Total
10 November 1946	45,168 (23.8%)	64,040 (33.7%)	41,377 (21.8%)	6,544 (3.4%)	4,249 (2.2%)	–	–	28,476 (15.0%)	189,854
27 May 1951	87,899 (36.1%)	81,980 (33.7%)	24,842 (10.2%)	10,808 (4.4%)	14,476 (5.9%)	–	12,621 (5.2%)	10,536 (4.3%)	243,162
27 May 1956	101,961 (39.2%)	69,190 (26.6%)	44,551 (17.1%)	11,105 (4.3%)	3,955 (1.5%)	13,684 (5.3%)	15,423 (5.9%)	–	259,869
6 November 1960	99,577 (34.9%)	92,841 (32.5%)	39,586 (13.9%)	13,653 (4.8%)	3,711 (1.3%)	18,620 (6.5%)	15,337 (5.4%)	2,326 (0.8%)	285,651
22 November 1964	87,117 (27.5%)	106,596 (33.7%)	32,801 (10.4%)	46,723 (14.7%)	2,345 (0.7%)	19,830 (6.4%)	13,669 (4.3%)	7,588 (2.4%)	316,669
12 June 1966 (Note: First snap election ever)	85,335 (28.6%)	104,820 (35.2%)	30,945 (10.9%)	30,945 (10.9%)	2,828 (0.9%)	22,102 (7.4%)	10,707 (3.6%)	8,735 (2.9%)	301,038
7 June 1970	95,272 (30.1%)	110,928 (35.0%)	30,011 (9.5%)	17,330 (5.5%)	6,320 (2.0%)	33,617 (10.6%)	15,151 (4.8%)	8,234 (2.5%)	316,863
15 June 1975	96,019 (29.9%)	137,433 (41.5%)	34,392 (10.4%)	7,415 (4.5%)	12,259 (3.7%)	17,327 (5.2%)	17,217 (5.2%)	9,232 (2.7%)	331,294
8 June 1980	94,139 (29.9%)	127,229 (40.5%)	38,844 (12.4%)	7,323 (2.3%)	12,289 (3.9%)	11,668 (3.7%)	13,775 (4.4%)	9,017 (2.9%)	314,284
12 May 1985	83,258 (26.5%)	125,442 (39.9%)	38,565 (12.3%)	7,316 (2.3%)	17,738 (5.6%)	6,433 (2.0%)	15,855 (5.1%)	19,032 (6.0%)	314,227
6 May 1990	73,238 (26.3%)	90,566 (32.5%)	37,248 (13.4%)	4,420 (1.6%)	19,419 (7.0%)	6,786 (2.4%)	9,796 (3.5%)	37,219; 13.3%)	278,692

Notes

Number of seats in the City Council for each party:

Election	DC	PCI	PSI	PLI	PRI	PSDI	MSI	Others	Total
10 November 1946	14	21	13	2	1	–	–	9	60
27 May 1951	31	13	4	4	5	–	1	1	60
27 May 1956	25	17	10	2	–	3	3	–	60
6 November 1960	22	20	8	3	–	4	3	–	60
22 November 1964	18	22	6	7	–	4	2	–	60
12 June 1966	18	22	7	7	–	4	2	–	60
7 June 1970	19	22	5	3	1	6	3	1	60
15 June 1975	18	26	6	1	2	3	3	1	60
8 June 1980	19	26	8	1	2	2	2	–	60
12 May 1985	17	25	7	1	3	1	3	3	60
6 May 1990	17	21	9	1	4	1	2	5	60

=== Mayoral and City Council election, 1995 ===
The election took place on 23 April 1995.

Results

Summary of the 1995 Florence City Council election results
Parties and coalitions		Votes	%	Seats
Democratic Party of the Left	PDS	88,105	36.05%	19
Communist Refoundation Party	PRC	25,347	10.37%	5
Pact of Democrats	PdD	9,090	3.72%	2
Federation of the Greens	FdV	7,168	2.93%	1
Labour Federation	FL	5,117	2.09%	1
Italian Republican Party	PRI	2,115	0.87%	0
Others		8,786	3.60%	1
Primicerio coalition (centre-left)		145,728	59.63%	29
Forza Italia–Christian Democratic Centre	FI–CCD	41,173	16.85%	8
Italian People's Party	PPI	10,389	4.25%	2
Pannella List	LP	2,914	1.19%	0
Morales coalition (centre-right)		54,476	22.29%	10
National Alliance	AN	39,298	16.08%	7
Others		4,875	2.00%	0
Total		244,377	100%	46
Votes cast/turnout		277,612	82.57%	
Registered voters		336,230		
Source: Ministry of the Interior

Candidate	Party	Coalition	First round	
Candidate	Party	Coalition	Votes	%
Mario Primicerio	None	The Olive Tree	158,746	59.94
Giorgio Morales	FI	Pole of Good Government	58,339	22.03
Marco Cellai	AN		42,116	15.90
Others			5,632	2.13
Eligible voters			336,230	100.00
Voted			277,612	82.57
Blank or invalid ballots			12,779	
Total valid votes			264,833	

=== Mayoral and City Council election, 1999 ===
The election took place on 13 June 1999.

Results

Summary of the 1999 Florence City Council election results
Parties and coalitions		Votes	%	Seats
Democrats of the Left	DS	61,274	31.48%	18
Party of Italian Communists	PdCI	11,166	5.74%	3
The Democrats	Dem	8,819	4.53%	2
Italian People's Party	PPI	7,133	3.66%	2
Italian Democratic Socialists	SDI	4,743	2.44%	1
Federation of the Greens	FdV	4,364	2.24%	1
Others		3,386	1.74%	1
Domenici coalition (centre-left)		100,885	51.83%	28
Forza Italia	FI	29,954	15.39%	8
National Alliance	AN	25,320	13.01%	6
Christian Democratic Centre	CCD	5,323	2.73%	1
Sgarbi List	LS	2,438	1.25%	0
Pensioners' Party	PP	995	0.51%	0
Others		4,276	2.20%	1
Scaramuzzi coalition (centre-right)		68,306	35.10%	16
Communist Refoundation Party	PRC	10,945	5.62%	2
Others		14,492	7.47%	0
Total		194,628	100%	46
Votes cast/turnout		223,494	69.04%	
Registered voters		323,704		
Source: Ministry of the Interior

Candidate	Party	Coalition	First round	
Candidate	Party	Coalition	Votes	%
Leonardo Domenici	DS	The Olive Tree	108,424	51.65
Franco Scaramuzzi	FI	Pole for Freedoms	74,836	35.65
Enrico Falqui	PRC		11,237	5.35
Giangualberto Pepi	MS–FT		3.022	1.44
Others			12,420	5.92
Eligible voters			323,704	100.00
Voted			223,494	69.04
Blank or invalid ballots			13,555	
Total valid votes			209,939	

=== Mayoral and City Council election, 2004 ===
The election took place in two rounds: the first on 12–13 June and the second on 26–27 June 2004.

Results

Candidate	Party	Coalition	First round		Second round	
Candidate	Party	Coalition	Votes	%	Votes	%
Leonardo Domenici	DS	The Olive Tree	109,043	49.15	102,269	66.04
Domenico Antonio Valentino	FI	House of Freedoms	66,005	29.75	52,582	33.96
Ornella De Zordo	PRC		27,302	12.31		
Franco Cardini	None		10,115	4.56		
Others			9,371	4.22		
Eligible voters			307,035	100.00	307,035	100.00
Voted			233,200	75.95	159,202	51.85
Blank or invalid ballots			11,364		4,351	
Total valid votes			221,836		154,851	

Summary of the 2004 Florence City Council election results
Parties and coalitions		Votes	%	Seats
Democrats of the Left	DS	62,572	30.55%	18
The Daisy	DL	16,756	8.18%	5
Party of Italian Communists	PdCI	11,065	5.40%	3
Federation of the Greens	FdV	5,024	2.45%	1
Italian Democratic Socialists	SDI	4,786	2.34%	1
Others		5,614	2.73%	0
Domenici coalition (centre-left)		105,817	51.67%	28
Forza Italia	FI	33,349	16.28%	8
National Alliance	AN	21,256	10.38%	5
Union of the Centre	UDC	7,913	3.86%	1
Lega Nord	LN	888	0.43%	0
Valentino coalition (centre-right)		63,406	30.96%	14
Communist Refoundation Party	PRC	21,409	10.45%	4
Others		14,165	6.91%	0
Total		204,797	100%	46
Votes cast/turnout		233,200	75.95%	
Registered voters		307,035		
Source: Ministry of the Interior

=== Mayoral and City Council election, 2009 ===
The election took place in two rounds: the first on 6–7 June and the second on 21–22 June 2009.

Results

Candidate	Party	Coalition	First round		Second round	
Candidate	Party	Coalition	Votes	%	Votes	%
Matteo Renzi	PD	PD–IdV–SEL	97,882	47.40	100,223	59.51
Giovanni Galli	PdL	PdL–LN	66,632	32.14	68,182	40.49
Valdo Spini	None	PRC–FdV	17,282	8.37		
Others			24,968	12.10		
Eligible voters			293,173	100.00	293,173	100.00
Voted			216,541	73.86	172,743	58.92
Blank or invalid ballots			10,047		4,338	
Total valid votes			206,494		168,405	

Summary of the 2009 Florence City Council election results
Parties and coalitions		Votes	%	Seats
Democratic Party	PD	68,245	35.29%	22
Renzi List	LR	10,526	5.44%	3
Italy of Values	IdV	5,540	2.86%	1
Left Ecology Freedom	SEL	4,478	2.32%	1
Others		5,732	2.96%	1
Renzi coalition (centre-left)		94,521	48.88%	28
The People of Freedom	PdL	39,361	20.36%	10
Galli List	LG	17,563	9.08%	4
Lega Nord	LN	2,660	1.38%	0
Others		2,022	1.04%	0
Galli coalition (centre-right)		61,606	31.86%	14
Greens–European Republicans Movement	FdV-MRE	7,692	3.98%	2
Federation of the Left	FdS	4,954	2.56%	0
Others		833	0.43%	0
Spini coalition (left-wing)		13,479	6.97%	2
De Zordo List	LDZ	7,336	3.79%	1
Citizens' Committees	CC	6,325	3.27%	1
Others		10,104	5.23%	0
Total		193,371	100%	46
Votes cast/turnout		216,541	73.86%	
Registered voters		293,173		
Source: Ministry of the Interior

=== Mayoral and City Council election, 2014 ===
The election took place on 25 May 2014.

Results

Summary of the 2014 Florence City Council election results
Parties and coalitions		Votes	%	Seats
Democratic Party	PD	86,906	47.23%	21
Nardella List	LN	16,114	8.76%	3
Others		6,898	3.75%	0
Nardella coalition (centre-left)		109,918	59.74%	24
Forza Italia	FI	17,988	9.78%	4
Lega Nord	LN	1,598	0.87%	0
Others		2,654	1.44%	0
Stella coalition (centre-right)		22,240	12.09%	4
Five Star Movement	M5S	17,486	9.50%	3
Left Ecology Freedom	SEL	7,677	4.17%	2
Florence to the Left	FaS	4,376	2.38%	1
Communist Refoundation Party	PRC	2,554	1.39%	0
Grassi coalition (left-wing)		14,607	7.94%	3
Scaletti List	LS	7,507	4.08%	1
Brothers of Italy	FdI	6,176	3.36%	1
Others		6,075	3.30%	0
Total		184,009	100%	36
Votes cast/turnout		194,245	67.22%	
Registered voters		288,971		
Source: Ministry of the Interior

Candidate	Party	Coalition	First round	
Candidate	Party	Coalition	Votes	%
Dario Nardella	PD		111,049	59.16
Marco Stella	FI	FI–LN	22,645	12.06
Miriam Amato	M5S		17,525	9.34
Tommaso Grassi	SEL	SEL–PRC	15,410	8.21
Others			21,081	11.22
Eligible voters			288,971	100.00
Voted			194,245	67.22
Blank or invalid ballots			6,535	
Total valid votes			187,710	

=== Mayoral and City Council election, 2019 ===
The election took place on 26 May 2019.

Results

Summary of the 2019 Florence City Council election results
Parties and coalitions		Votes	%	Seats
Democratic Party (Partito Democratico)	PD	74,020	41.23%	19
Nardella List (Lista Nardella)	LN	14,914	8.31%	3
More Europe (Più Europa)	+Eu	3,257	1.81%	0
Others		8,154	4.54%	0
Nardella coalition (centre-left)		100,345	55.90%	22
Lega (Lega)	Lega	25,922	14.44%	6
Forza Italia	FI	7,629	4.25%	3
Brothers of Italy (Fratelli d'Italia)	FdI	7,617	4.24%	1
Others		4,448	2.48%	0
Bocci coalition (centre-right)		45,616	25.45%	10
Florence Open City (Firenze Città Aperta)	FCA	5,596	3.12%	2
Italian Left (Sinistra Italiana)	SI	4,056	2.26%	0
Power to the People! (Potere al Popolo!)	PaP	3,384	1.88%	0
Moro Bundu coalition (left-wing)		13,036	7.26%	2
Five Star Movement (Movimento Cinque Stelle)	M5S	12,574	7.00%	2
Others		7,952	4.43%	0
Total		179,523	100%	36
Votes cast/turnout		196,601	68.06%	
Registered voters		288,866		
Source: Ministry of the Interior

Candidate	Party	Coalition	First round	
Candidate	Party	Coalition	Votes	%
Dario Nardella	PD	PD-+E-MDP	109,728	57.05
Ubaldo Bocci	Ind	Lega–FI-FdI-UDC	47,690	24.79
Antonella Moro Bundu	SI	SI-PaP	14,016	7.29
Roberto De Blasi	M5S		12,692	6.60
Andreas Lasso	FdV		3,493	1.82
Others			4,723	2.47
Eligible voters			288,866	100.00
Voted			196,601	68.06
Blank or invalid ballots			4,197	
Total valid votes			192,342	

=== Mayoral and City Council election, 2024 ===
The election took place in two rounds: the first on 8–9 June and the second on 23–24 June 2024.

Results

Summary of the 2024 Florence City Council election results
Parties and coalitions		Votes	%	Seats
Democratic Party (Partito Democratico)	PD	51,617	30.04%	16
Funaro List (Lista Funaro)	LF	10,581	6.16%	3
Greens and Left Alliance (Alleanza Verdi e Sinistra)	AVS	9,282	5.40%	3
Action (Azione)	Azione	2,075	1.21%	0
More Europe (Più Europa)	+Eu	1,325	0.77%	0
Others		1,196	0.69%	0
Funaro coalition (centre-left)		76,076	44.27%	22
Brothers of Italy (Fratelli d'Italia)	FdI	22,597	13.15%	4
Schmidt List (Lista Schmidt)	LS	16,458	9.58%	3
Lega	Lega	8,695	5.06%	1
Forza Italia	FI	7,267	4.23%	1
Schmidt coalition (centre-right)		55,017	32.02%	9
Italia Viva	IV	12,616	7.34%	2
Democratic Florence (Firenze Democratica)	FD	10,363	6.03%	1
Common Project to the Left (Sinistra Progetto Comune)	SPC	8,795	5.12%	1
Five Star Movement (Movimento Cinque Stelle)	M5S	6,068	3.53%	1
Others		2,910	1.69%	0
Total		171,845	100%	36
Votes cast/turnout		185,954	64.44%	
Registered voters		288,571		
Source: Ministry of the Interior

Candidate	Party	Coalition	First round		Second round	
Candidate	Party	Coalition	Votes	%	Votes	%
Sara Funaro	PD	PD-AVS-A-+E	78,126	43.17	82,254	60.56
Eike Schmidt	Ind	FdI-FI-Lega	59,465	32.86	53,558	39.44
Stefania Saccardi	IV	IV-PSI-LDE	13,186	7.29		
Cecilia Del Re	Ind		11,240	6.21		
Dmitrij Palagi Gabriellovic	Ind	PRC-PaP-Pos	9,868	5.45		
Lorenzo Masi	M5S		6,068	3.35		
Others			3,006	1.65		
Eligible voters			288,571	100.00	288,571	100.00
Voted			185,954	64.44	138,444	47.98
Blank or invalid ballots			4,995		2,632	
Total valid votes			180,959		135,812	

== Deputy Mayor ==
The office of the Deputy Mayor of Florence was officially created in 1995 with the adoption of the new local administration law. The Deputy Mayor is nominated and eventually dismissed by the mayor.

	Deputy	Term start	Term end	Party	Mayor
1	Alberto Brasca	2 May 1995	14 June 1999	PDS	Primicerio
2	Andrea Ceccarelli	30 June 1999	4 March 2002	DS	Domenici
3	Giuseppe Matulli	4 March 2002	28 June 2004	DL; PD	Domenici
3	Giuseppe Matulli	8 July 2004	22 June 2009	DL; PD	Domenici
4	Dario Nardella	27 June 2009	11 March 2013	PD	Renzi
5	Stefania Saccardi	11 March 2013	14 February 2014	PD	Renzi
(4)	Dario Nardella	14 February 2014	5 June 2014	PD	Renzi
6	Cristina Giachi	5 June 2014	29 May 2019	PD	Nardella
6	Cristina Giachi	3 June 2019	20 October 2020 (Note: Resigned after the 2020 Tuscan regional election where he was elected regional councillor)	PD	Nardella
7	Alessia Bettini	24 October 2020	26 June 2024	Ind	Nardella
8	Paola Galgani	12 July 2024	Incumbent	Ind	Funaro

== See also ==
- Timeline of Florence
