= Luigi Tassinari =

Italian politician (1929–2014)

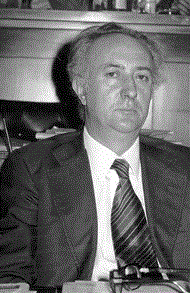

Regional assessor for Culture, Education and Sports of Tuscany
- In office 28 July 1975 – 18 May 1982

Member of the Regional Council of Tuscany
- In office 1975–1985

President of the Province of Florence
- In office 1970–1975
- Preceded by: Elio Gabbuggiani
- Succeeded by: Franco Ravà

Personal details
- Born: 6 January 1929 Florence, Kingdom of Italy
- Died: 8 May 2014 (aged 85) Montevarchi, Province of Arezzo, Italy
- Party: Italian Communist Party (PCI)
- Education: University of Florence

Luigi Tassinari (6 January 1929 – 8 May 2014) was an Italian politician and educator. A member of the Italian Communist Party, he served as president of the Province of Florence, a member of the Regional Council of Tuscany, and regional assessor for culture, education and sports.

== Life and career ==
Born in Florence, Tassinari studied history at the University of Florence and worked as a teacher and school administrator. He joined the Italian Communist Party (PCI) in 1950.

He was elected to the Provincial Council of Florence in 1964 and later became provincial assessor for economic development and culture. In 1970, he was elected president of the Province of Florence.

In 1975, Tassinari was elected to the Regional Council of Tuscany. He served in the regional government led by Lelio Lagorio as assessor for culture, later holding responsibilities for culture, education and sports. He was re-elected in 1980 and remained in office until 1982.

From 1986 to 1991, he served as president of the Gabinetto Vieusseux, a cultural institution in Florence.

Tassinari died in Montevarchi on 8 May 2014 at the age of 85.
