= Mario Fabiani =

Italian politician and anti-fascist (1912–1974)

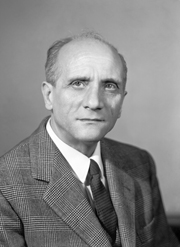

Mayor of Florence
- In office 29 November 1946 – 4 July 1951
- Preceded by: Gaetano Pieraccini
- Succeeded by: Giorgio La Pira

President of the Province of Florence
- In office 10 July 1951 – 9 March 1962
- Preceded by: Mario Tanini
- Succeeded by: Elio Gabbuggiani

Senator of the Republic
- In office 16 May 1963 – 13 February 1974
- Constituency: Tuscany

Personal details
- Born: 9 February 1912 Empoli, Province of Florence, Kingdom of Italy
- Died: 13 February 1974 (aged 62) Florence, Tuscany, Italy
- Party: Italian Communist Party
- Occupation: Journalist

Mario Fabiani (9 February 1912 – 13 February 1974) was an Italian politician, anti-fascist, and resistance leader. He was the first elected mayor of Florence after World War II, serving from 1946 to 1951. He later served as president of the Province of Florence from 1951 to 1962 and as a senator for the Italian Communist Party from 1963 until his death in 1974.
