= Sara Funaro =

Italian politician (born 1976)

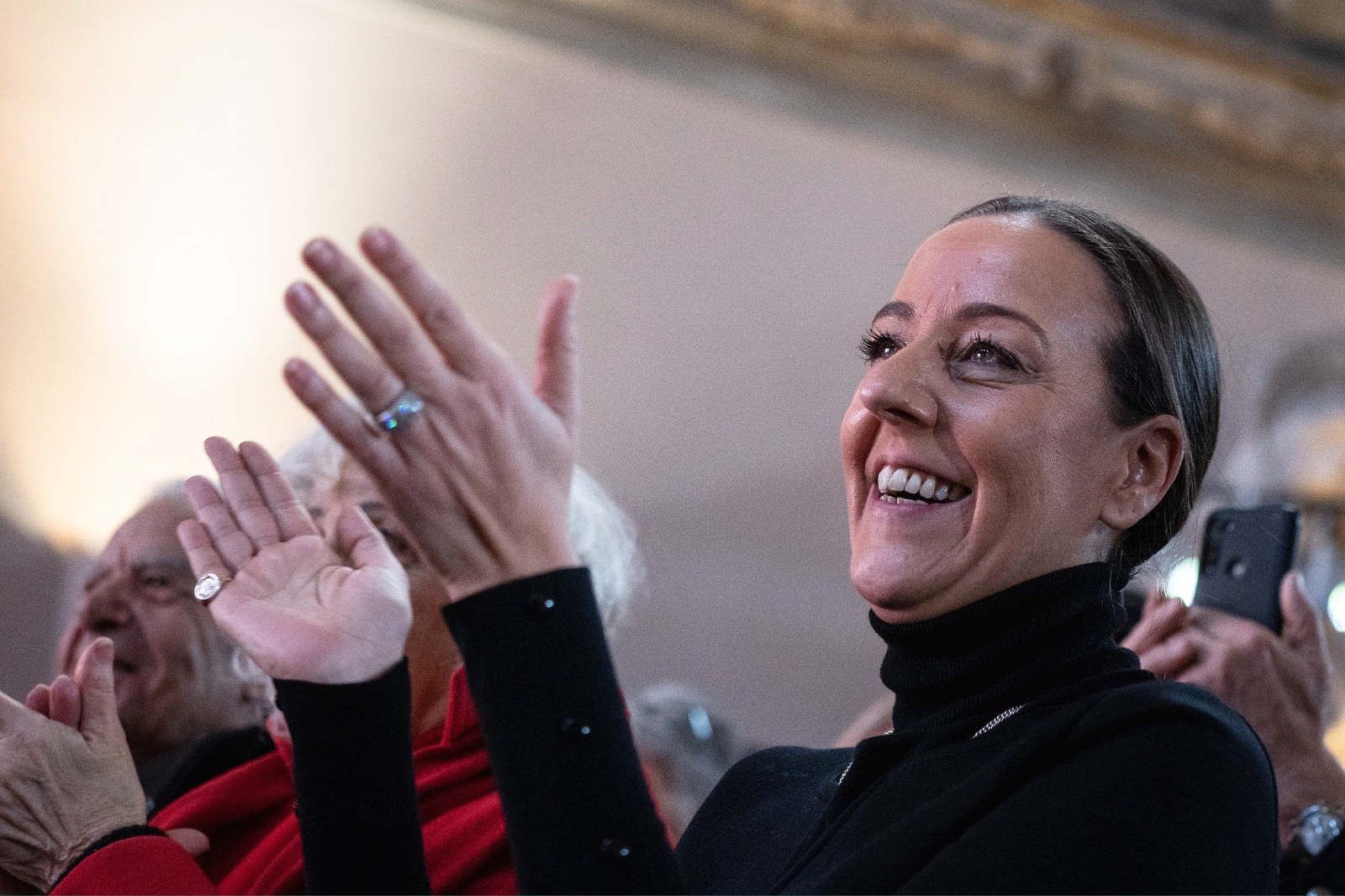
- Funaro in 2023.

Mayor of Florence
- Incumbent
- Assumed office 26 June 2024
- Preceded by: Dario Nardella

Metropolitan Mayor of Florence
- Incumbent
- Assumed office 26 June 2024
- Preceded by: Dario Nardella

Personal details
- Born: 12 May 1976 (age 50) Florence, Italy
- Party: PD (since 2014)
- Education: University of Florence
- Profession: Psychotherapist

Sara Funaro (born 12 May 1976) is an Italian politician, Mayor of Florence since 26 June 2024. She is the first woman to hold this office.

== Biography ==
Born in 1976, Funaro is the granddaughter of Piero Bargellini, mayor of Florence during the 1966 flood of the Arno.

She obtained a degree in clinical psychology at the University of Florence and a specialization in phenomenological psychotherapy at the University of Urbino and a master's degree in ethnopsychiatry at the Center Devereux in Paris.

A member of the Democratic Party, Funaro has been councilor for health, reception and equal opportunities from 2014 to 2024 under the mayorship of Dario Nardella.

=== Mayor of Florence ===
In the 2024 local elections, Funaro became the centre-left candidate for the office of Mayor of Florence, supported by the Democratic Party, the Greens and Left Alliance, More Europe and Action. She was elected in the run-off against the former director of the Uffizi Gallery Eike Schmidt, supported by the centre-right coalition, thus becoming the first woman to lead the city of Florence.

After taking office, in the Il Sole 24 Ore Governance Poll her approval rating was 55% in 2025, but by July 2026 she had become Italy's most popular mayor of a provincial capital with 66% approval.
