= Giancarlo Zoli =

Italian politician and lawyer (1917–2007)

Mayor of Florence
- In office 12 September 1974 – 19 October 1974
- Preceded by: Luciano Bausi
- Succeeded by: Elio Gabbuggiani

Personal details
- Born: 7 September 1917 Bologna, Kingdom of Italy
- Died: 25 April 2007 (aged 89) Florence, Italy
- Party: Christian Democracy
- Parent: Adone Zoli (father)
- Occupation: Lawyer

Giancarlo Zoli (7 September 1917 – 25 April 2007) was an Italian lawyer and politician of Christian Democracy who served as mayor of Florence in 1974.

== Life and career ==
Born in Bologna in 1917, Zoli was the son of Italian politician and future prime minister Adone Zoli. A lawyer by profession, he took part in the Italian Resistance in Florence during World War II. In November 1943, he was arrested by members of the Banda Carità and imprisoned at Villa Triste and the Fortezza da Basso alongside his father and brother.

A member of Christian Democracy, Zoli entered municipal politics in 1956 as a member of the Florence City Council. He later served as an alderman in the administrations of Giorgio La Pira and Luciano Bausi. He was also active in pro-European organizations, including the European Federalist Movement, and was a founding member of the Association for Jewish–Christian Friendship.

Zoli briefly served as mayor of Florence in 1974. Outside politics, he held leading positions in several cultural and historical institutions, including the Tuscan Institute for the History of the Resistance.

He died in Florence in 2007. In 2016, the City of Florence named a public square in his honour.
