= Solaria (magazine) =

Monthly literary magazine in Italy (1926–1936)

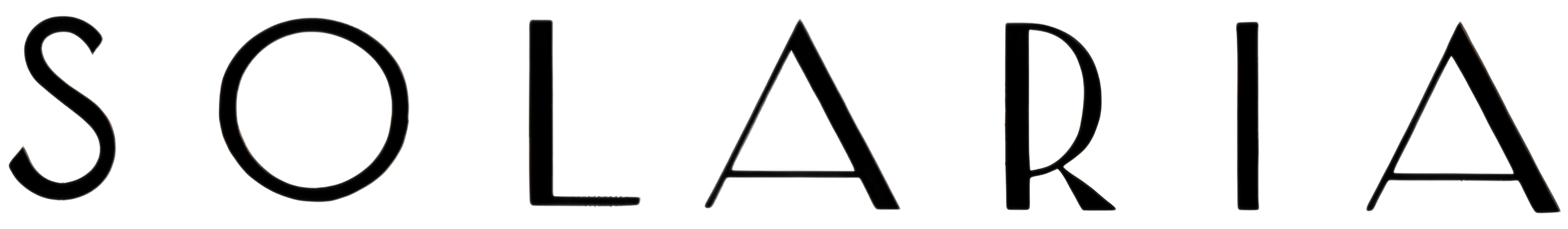

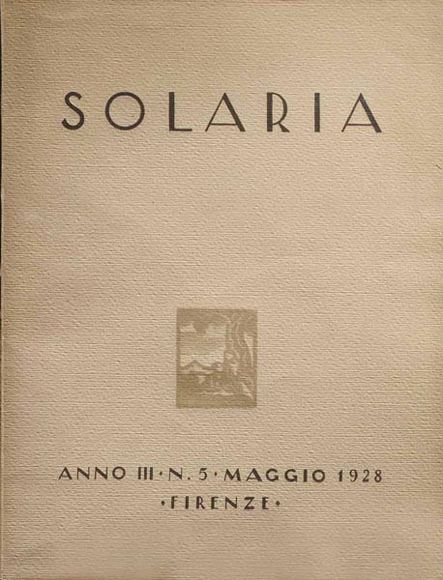
- Solaria Magazine's May 1928 issue cover
- Categories: Literary magazine
- Frequency: Monthly
- Publisher: Edizioni di Solaria
- Founder: Alessandro Bonsanti; Alberto Carocci
- Founded: 1926
- Final issue: 1936
- Country: Kingdom of Italy
- Based in: Florence
- Language: Italian

Solaria was a modernist literary magazine published in Florence, Italy, between 1926 and 1936. The title is a reference to the city of sun. The magazine is known for its significant influence on young Italian writers. It was one of the publications which contributed to the development of the concept of Europeanism.

== History and profile ==
Solaria was established in Florence in 1926. It was inspired from two magazines: La Voce and La Ronda. The founders were Alessandro Bonsanti and Alberto Carocci. Its publisher was Edizioni di Solaria, and the magazine was published on a monthly basis. As of 1929 Giansiro Ferrata served as the co-editor of the magazine. Alessandro Bonsanti replaced him in the post in 1930 which he held until 1933.

The major goal of Solaria was to Europeanize Italian culture and to emphasize the contributions of Italian modernist writers such as Svevo and Federigo Tozzi to the European modernism. It adopted a modernist approach. The magazine had an anti-fascist stance. Its contributors were mostly the short story writers. They included Alberto Carocci, Eugenio Montale, Elio Vittorini, Carlo Emilio Gadda. and Renato Poggioli. The novel of Elio Vittorini, Il garofano rosso, was first published in the magazine. The magazine also featured poems by young Italian artists, including Sandro Penna. Gianna Manzini published her first short stories in the magazine. It also featured translations of modernist writers, including Virginia Woolf, Ernest Hemingway, William Faulkner, James Joyce, T. S. Eliot, Marcel Proust, Rainer Maria Rilke, Franz Kafka, and Thomas Mann. Solaria was harshly criticized by other Italian literary circles and magazines, including Il Selvaggio, Il Bargello and Il Frontespizio, due to its frequent coverage of the work by Jewish writers.

After producing a total of forty-one volumes Solaria ceased publication in 1936. Its final issue was dated 1934, although it was published in 1936. In fact, it was censored by the fascist authorities partly due to the serialization of Elio Vittorini's novel, Il garofano rosso, in the magazine.
