= Vase of Flowers (van Huysum) =

Painting by Jan van Huysum

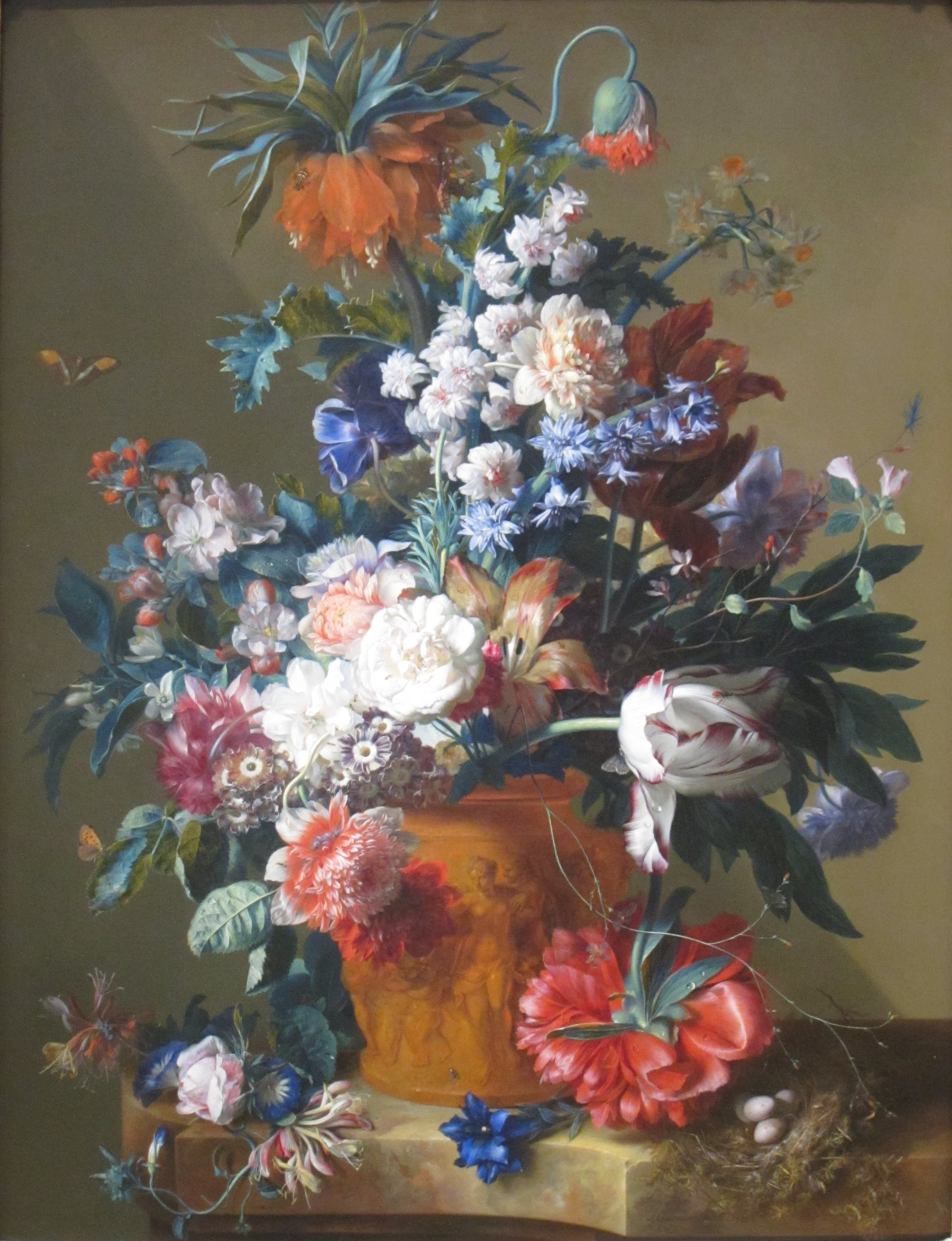
Jan van Huysum, Vase of flowers, The J. Paul Getty Museum, Los Angeles

Vase of Flowers is a painting by the Dutch artist Jan van Huysum. The painting is a still life and depicts a vase of late spring flowers, including roses and iris. The painting was in the collection of the Galleria Palatina in Palazzo Pitti in Florence until its 1943 theft by the retreating Wehrmacht following the Allied invasion of Italy in 1943. The painting had been bought by Grand Duke Leopoldo II for his collection in 1824. An interest in botany arose in Holland nearing the end of the 1500s and caused an increase in the demand for floral still lifes.

After the war the painting came into the possession of a German family, who attempted through intermediaries to sell the painting back to the Galleria. Eike Schmidt, the Director of the Uffizi Gallery, launched an appeal to return the painting in January 2019 and hung a reproduction of the piece labeled stolen in Italian, German and English in its former place in Palazzo Pitti. Schmidt said in a statement that due to the theft of the painting "...the wounds of the Second World War and Nazi terror are not yet healed...Germany has a moral duty to return the works to our museum and I hope this will be done as soon as possible, along with every other work of art looted by the Nazi army".

On July 19, 2019, the painting was officially handed back to the Uffizi Gallery. German minister of foreign affairs Heiko Maas personally handed the picture to his Italian counterpart Enzo Moavero Milanesi in Florence. Since the statute of limitations in a case of theft would have run out according to German law, the return is viewed by journalists as a sign of European solidarity in times of political instability, especially in light of the crisis of migration and refugees on the Mediterranean Sea during late spring and summer 2019.
