= Mario Primicerio =

Italian politician (1940–2025)

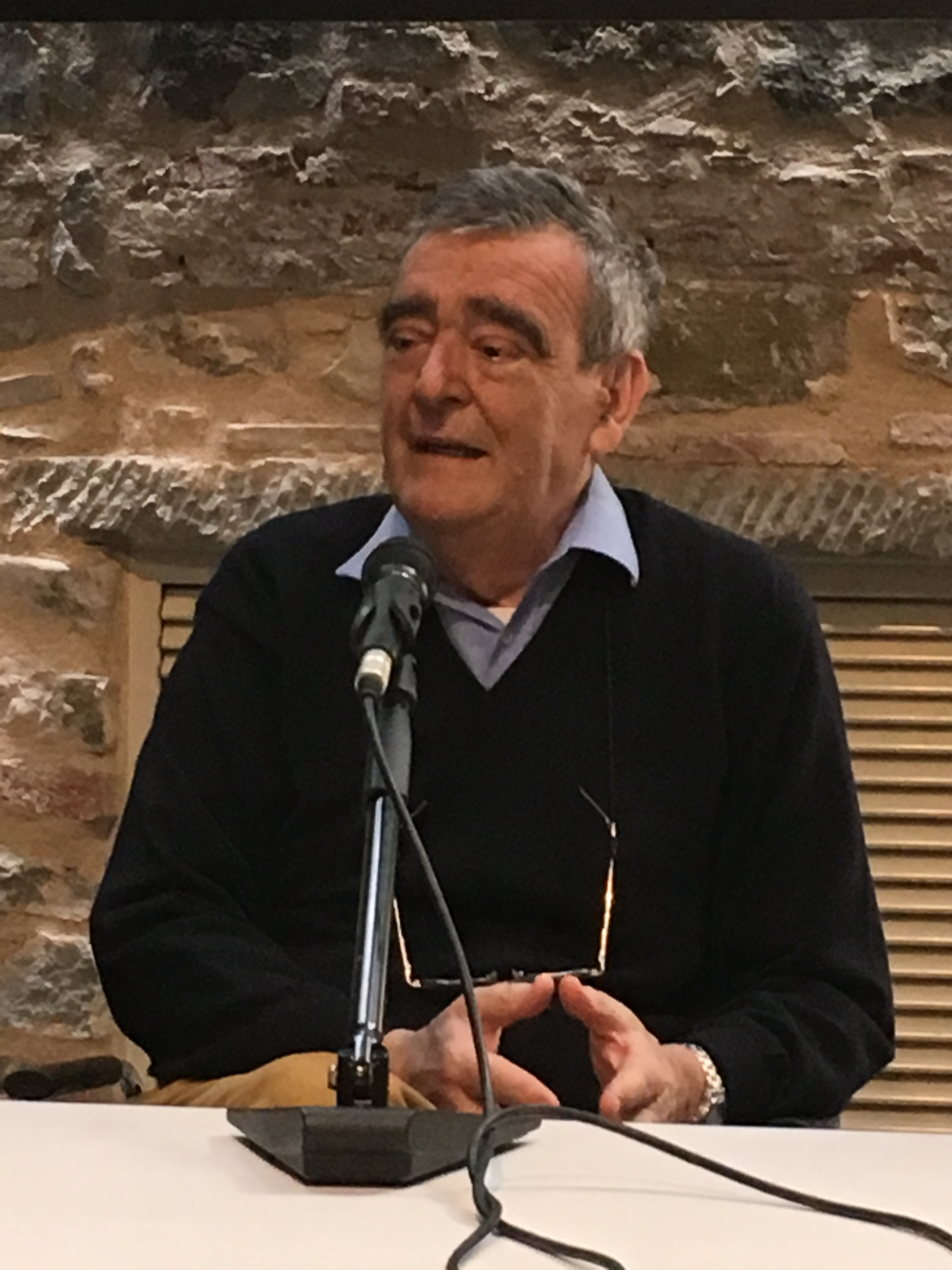
- Primicerio in 2018

Mayor of Florence
- In office 24 April 1995 – 14 June 1999
- Preceded by: Giorgio Morales
- Succeeded by: Leonardo Domenici

Personal details
- Born: 13 November 1940 Rome, Italy
- Died: 30 May 2025 (aged 84) Florence, Italy
- Party: Centre-left independent
- Education: University of Florence
- Profession: University professor

Mario Primicerio (13 November 1940 – 30 May 2025) was an Italian mathematician and politician who served as Mayor of Florence.

== Life and career ==
Graduating with a degree in physics from the University of Florence, in 1970 Primicerio started teaching at the university after working as a researcher at the ionized gas laboratory in Frascati. During these years he became a close collaborator of the former Mayor of Florence Giorgio La Pira.

In 1995, Primicerio ran for the office of Mayor himself on an independent center-left platform, which was supported by the former communist Democratic Party of the Left and various other progressive parties, such as the new-born Federation of the Greens and the Communist Refoundation Party. The main opposition to Primicerio's coalition came from Giorgio Morales, the outgoing mayor, former member of the Italian Socialist Party and later a supporter of Silvio Berlusconi's Forza Italia party.

Primicerio won the election in the first round and became the first elected Mayor, remaining in office until he retired from politics in 1999.

Layer he was appointed a visiting professor at several universities, in places such as Austin, Beijing, Helsinki, Minneapolis, Novosibirsk, Oxford, Paris, Rosario, São Carlos, and Tel Aviv.

Primicerio died on 30 May 2025, at the age of 84.

Political offices
Preceded by Giorgio Morales	Mayor of Florence; 1995–1999	Succeeded by Leonardo Domenici
