= Niccolini =

Niccolini is a surname. Notable people with the surname include:

- Antonio Niccolini (abbot) (1701–1769), Italian abbot, jurist and scholar
- Antonio Niccolini (architect) (1772–1850), Italian architect and engraver
- Dianora Niccolini (born 1936), Italian fine art photographer
- Francesco Niccolini (1639–1692), Italian archbishop and diplomat
- Giovanni Battista Niccolini (1782–1861), Italian poet and playwright
- Ippolito Niccolini (1848–1919), Italian businessman and politician
- Julian Niccolini, American restaurateur
