= List of presidents of the Province of Florence =

President of the Province of Florence
- Presidente della Provincia di Firenze
- Inaugural holder: Piero Puccioni
- Formation: 1889
- Final holder: Andrea Barducci
- Abolished: 2014
- Superseded by: Metropolitan mayor of Florence

The president of the Province of Florence was the head of the provincial administration of Florence, a local government authority in Tuscany, Italy.

== History ==
The office of president of the Province of Florence originated in the institutional structure created after the unification of Italy in 1861. At that time, provincial administrations were governed by a Provincial Council (legislative body) and a Provincial Deputation (executive body). The president of the deputation was initially the prefect of the province. The first locally elected president was Piero Puccioni, who held office from 1889 to 1892.

During the Fascist regime (1926–1944), elected provincial institutions were abolished and replaced by the Provincial Rectorate, headed by officials appointed by the central government. This system eliminated local electoral autonomy and concentrated administrative powers in state-appointed authorities.

Following the end of World War II, the Provincial Deputation was restored (1944–1951) as a transitional form of local government. In 1951, the modern office of president of the Province of Florence was formally established, with the president elected by the Provincial Council.

From 1995 to 2014, the president was directly elected by the citizens of the province, in accordance with reforms to local government electoral law. Following the abolition of the Province of Florence in 2014 as part of the Delrio reform, the office was discontinued and replaced by the mayor of the Metropolitan City of Florence, who assumed its functions as head of the Metropolitan City Council.

== List ==
=== Presidents of the Provincial Deputation (1889–1926) ===
No.	Portrait	Name	Term of office		Party
No.	Portrait	Name	Start	End	Party
1		Piero Puccioni	1889	1892	
2		Niccolò Nobili	1892	1900	
3		Antonio Del Pela	1900	1902	
4		Carlo Municchi	1902	1906	
5		Antonio Carpi	1906	1907	
6		Vittorio Calosi	1907	1909	
7		Annibale Rellini	1909	1911	
8		Alessandro Malenchini	1911	1919	
9		Sebastiano Del Buono	1920	1921	PSI
10		Giuseppe Pennella	1921	1922	
—		Emanuele Vivorio	1922	1923	Commissioner
11		Angiolo Badiani	1924	1926	PNF

=== Presidents of the Provincial Rectorate (1926–1944) ===
No.	Portrait	Name	Term of office		Party
No.	Portrait	Name	Start	End	Party
1		Angiolo Badiani	1926	1934	PNF
2		Diego Sanesi	1934	1942	PNF
3		Giovanni Ginori Conti	1942	1943	PNF

=== Presidents of the Provincial Deputation (1944–1951) ===
No.	Portrait	Name	Term of office		Party
No.	Portrait	Name	Start	End	Party
1		Mario Augusto Martini	1944	1945	DC
2		Ezio Donatini	1945	1948	DC
3		Fosco Frizzi	1948	1948	PCI
4		Mario Tanini	1948	1951	DC

=== Presidents of the Province (1951–2014) ===
No.	Portrait	Name	Term of office		Party
No.	Portrait	Name	Start	End	Party
1		Mario Fabiani	1951	1962	PCI
2		Elio Gabbuggiani	1962	1970	PCI
3		Luigi Tassinari	1970	1975	PCI
4		Franco Ravà	1975	1980	PSI
5		Renato Righi	1980	1981	PSI
6		Oublesse Conti	1981	1985	PCI
7		Alberto Brasca	1985	1990	PCI
8		Mila Pieralli	3 August 1990	24 April 1995	PCI
9		Michele Gesualdi	24 April 1995	25 June 2004	PPI / DL
10		Matteo Renzi	25 June 2004	8 June 2009	DL / PD
11		Andrea Barducci	8 June 2009	31 December 2014	PD

== Sources ==
- Favuzza, Salvatore; Guasti, Ivo; Rossi, Alberto (1974). La deputazione provinciale 1944-1951. Florence: Provincia di Firenze.
- Menichini, Piera (2005). "I presidenti delle Province dall'Unità alla Grande guerra: repertorio analitico". Storia Amministrazione Costituzione (13): 249–250.
- Merendoni, Simonetta; Mugnanini, Giorgio (1996). La Provincia di Firenze e i suoi amministratori dal 1860 a oggi. Florence: Leo S. Olschki.
