= Leonardo Domenici =

Italian politician

Leonardo Domenici MEP
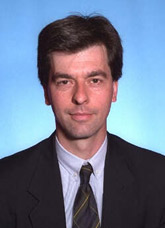

Member of the European Parliament for Central Italy
- In office 14 July 2009 – 1 July 2014

Mayor of Florence
- In office 14 June 1999 – 22 June 2009
- Preceded by: Mario Primicerio
- Succeeded by: Matteo Renzi

Member of the Chamber of Deputies
- In office 15 April 1994 – 10 September 1999
- Constituency: Florence

Personal details
- Born: 12 July 1955 (age 71) Florence, Italy
- Party: PCI (1976–1991); PDS (1991–1998); DS (1998–2007); PD (2007–2014)
- Education: University of Florence
- Occupation: Politician
- Website: http://www.leonardodomenici.eu

Leonardo Domenici (born 12 July 1955) is an Italian politician. He served as Mayor of Florence from 1999 to 2009.

== Biography ==
Leonardo Domenici was born in Florence in 1955, later graduating in moral philosophy from the University of Florence.

=== Political life ===
Domenici started his political career in 1976. He joined the ‘’Federazione Giovanile Comunista Italiana’’ (Italian Youth Communist Federation) at the age of 15, and was elected Florence city councilor in 1990 as member of the Italian Communist Party (PCI), serving until 1995.

He was elected MP in 1994 and re-elected in the following elections in 1996. He spent a lot of time working for the “Institutional Affairs” commission at the Italian Chamber of Deputies, dedicating his efforts in the reforms of Regions and local institutions.

==== As Mayor of Florence ====
Guiding a centre-left coalition, on 13 June 1999, he was elected Mayor of Florence at the first round and, on 27 June 2004, was elected again for a second term.
He was the Chairman of ANCI, the national association of Italian municipalities (2000-2009), and a member of the Bureau of the Committee of the Regions (2008-2009).

Domenici awarded Dante Alighieri the city's highest honour and revoked the sentence on the poet from 1302 which stated that he would be executed if he set foot in the city again.

==== As Member of European Parliament ====
Currently, Leonardo Domenici is an MEP, belonging to the Progressive Alliance of Socialists and Democrats (S&D), where he is member of the Committee on Economic and Monetary Affairs and of the Delegation to the EU-Russia Parliamentary Cooperation Committee.

Since 2011 he is rapporteur for the European Parliament on the credit rating agencies regulation.

=== As President of Fiorentina ===
In 2002 Leonardo Domenici, as Mayor of Florence, created a new football society, Fiorentina 1926 Florentia, later Florentia Viola, in order to replace the bankrupted AC Fiorentina.

He was the President of this new society until Diego Della Valle bought the team.

== Awards ==
- Grand Decoration of Honour in Gold with Star (Großes Goldenes Ehrenzeichen mit Stern), Republic of Austria

== Controversies ==
In February 2008, Domenici and one of the city assessors of Florence announced intentions to launch a suit against the free online encyclopedia Wikipedia.

== See also ==
- 2009 European Parliament election in Italy
