= Dario Nardella =

Italian politician (born 1975)

Dario Nardella MEP
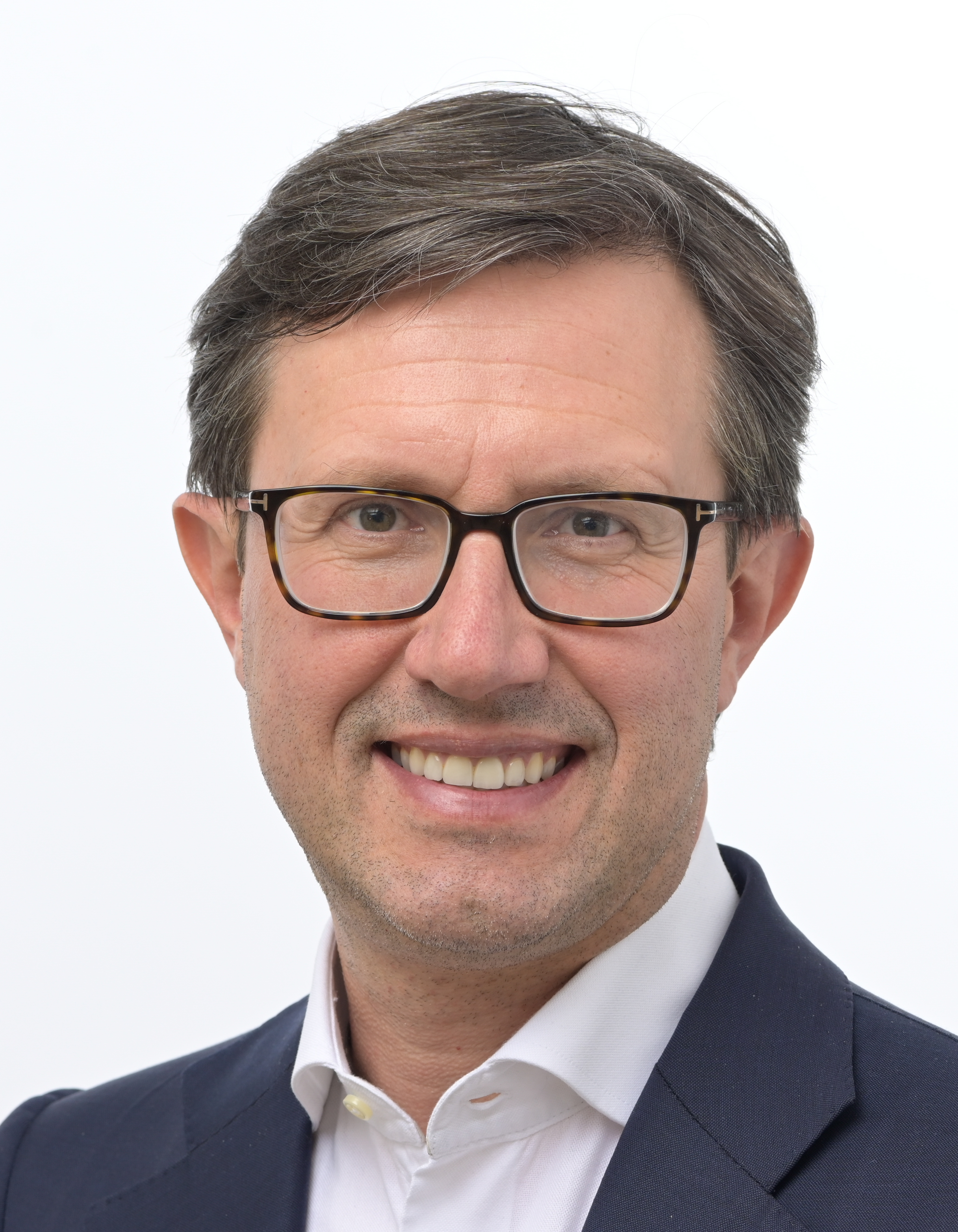
- Nardella in 2024

Member of the European Parliament for Central Italy
- Incumbent
- Assumed office 16 July 2024

Mayor of Florence
- In office 26 May 2014 – 26 June 2024
- Preceded by: Matteo Renzi
- Succeeded by: Sara Funaro

Metropolitan Mayor of Florence
- In office 1 January 2015 – 26 June 2024
- Preceded by: Office established
- Succeeded by: Sara Funaro

Member of the Chamber of Deputies
- In office 15 March 2013 – 7 May 2014
- Constituency: Tuscany

Personal details
- Born: 20 November 1975 (age 50) Torre del Greco, Italy
- Party: DS (2004–2007); PD (since 2007)
- Education: University of Florence
- Profession: Politician, university professor
- Website: darionardella.it

Dario Nardella (born 20 November 1975) is an Italian politician who was the Mayor of Florence from 26 May 2014 to 26 June 2024 and the first Metropolitan Mayor of Florence. He is the first mayor of Florence who has been elected twice in the first term. He was also a deputy for the Democratic Party in the 17th legislature until his election as mayor.

Nardella earned a law degree as well as a Ph.D. in public law at the University of Florence. He is also a graduate in violin from the Conservatorio Luigi Cherubini.

On 1 February 2020, Nardella encouraged Italians to "hug a Chinese" to combat what he described as "psychological terrorism" in the wake of the COVID-19 pandemic.

Nardella was the president of Eurocities from 2020 to 2023.

Term-limited in 2024, Nardella ran for European Parliament on the Democratic Party list in Central Italy constituency. He received 118 784 preference votes and was elected.

== Biography ==
He was born in Torre del Greco, in the province of Naples, to parents originally from San Marco in Lamis (in the province of Foggia). His father, Umberto, was a professor of Hindi and Urdu language and literature at the University of Naples "L'Orientale" until 2007 and the author of numerous monographs on the cultures and languages of Southeast Asia. He spent his childhood in the Campania town and, at the age of 14, moved to Florence, where in 1994 he earned his high school diploma in science from the G.B. Morgagni Scientific High School and in 1998 received his diploma in violin from the Luigi Cherubini Conservatory in Florence. He pursued a professional career in music until 2004.

In 2001, he earned a law degree from the University of Florence with a grade of 110 cum laude, and later obtained a Ph.D. in public law and environmental law from the same university. He also served as an adjunct professor of cultural heritage law at the same university.

In 2005, he founded the "Eunomia" Foundation together with Prof. Enzo Cheli, Prof. Leonardo Morlino, and other friends and university colleagues; he currently serves as its director.
