= Jean-Louis Martinoty =

French writer and opera director (1946-2016)

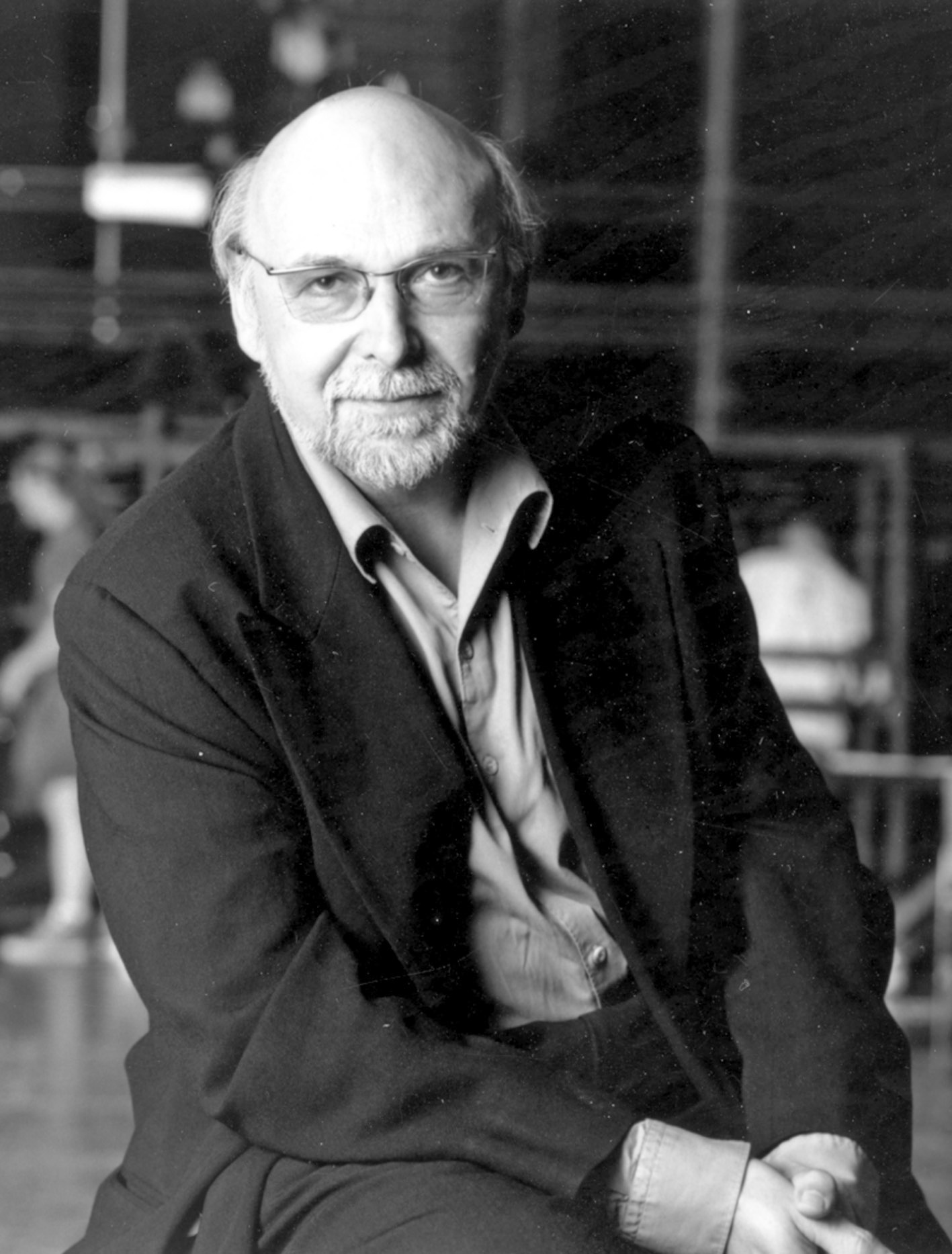
Jean-Louis Martinoty in 2007

Jean-Louis Martinoty (20 January 1946 in Étampes – 27 January 2016 in Neuilly-sur-Seine) was a French writer and an opera director. Renowned for his stagings of baroque operas in the eighties, he was also General Administrator of the Paris Opera (1986–1989).

== Biography ==
Jean-Louis Martinoty spent his childhood and his teens in Algeria where his father was a tax official. In 1961, his parents returned to France and settled in Nice. Martinoty studied classical letters and cello. He started his professional life as a French teacher for some years, then becoming a writer and music critic for the newspaper L'Humanité. In 1972, he interviewed the stage director Jean-Pierre Ponnelle, who invited him to come to the Salzburg Festival where he was preparing Mozart's The Marriage of Figaro. After replacing Ponnelle for a rehearsal he became his assistant and the writer of the scripts for most of his opera films (including La clemenza di Tito, Madama Butterfly and Carmina Burana). Martinoty made one film himself (Pasticcio from Haendel) and realized two documentaries about Italian mannerism. In 1992, he married Tamara Adloff.

Jean-Louis Martinoty made his first staging in 1975 with Benjamin Britten's A Midsummer' s Night Dream at the Strasbourg Opera. It was followed by Offenbach's La Perichole. The Lyon Opera subsequently asked him to stage two Baroque operas whose music had been forgotten since more than two centuries, Cavalli's Ercole Amante (1979) and Charpentier's David et Jonathas (1981). Martinoty continued with numerous other Baroque productions. Among his more famous efforts are Monteverdi's L'incoronazione di Poppea (1982) with Jean-Claude Malgoire and Jean-Philippe Rameau's, Les Boreades at the Musical Festival of Aix-en-Provence with John Eliot Gardiner. This last opera, put on for the first time since 1770, obtained a striking success and the Lyric Grand Prix Review. Some years later, Martinoty revived Lully's Alceste in a memorable production at the Théâtre des Champs-Elysées, next to Salieri'sTarare, Cesti's L'Argia and Gassmann's L'Opera Seria at the Schwetzingen Festival.

Inspired by his Baroque experiences Martinoty published the book Voyages à l'intérieur de l'opéra baroque, de Monteverdi à Mozart ('Travels inside Baroque opera, from Monteverdi to Mozart', 1990) in which ten opera works are analyzed on dramatic, scenographic and political levels.

His roughly one hundred stagings between 1975 and 2015 feature the whole opera repertory and were presented on both French and international stages : Richard Strauss's Ariadne auf Naxos at Covent Garden, Wagner's Der Ring des Nibelungen in Karlsruhe Festival (for which he designed the sets), Offenbach's Orpheus in the Underworld in the Paris Opera, Bizet's Carmen in Tokyo, Mozart's Don Giovanni in the Wiener Staatsoper, etc. He also made an excursion into the Viennese operetta with Franz Lehár's The Merry Widow and Johan Strauss's The Gipsy Baron at the Zurich Opera under the musical direction of Nikolaus Harnoncourt, and even musical comedy with The Little Prince (Casino de Paris, 2002), based on Saint-Exupery's novel with new music by Richard Cocciante.

Martinoty's strong acting direction, his erudite stagings in regular collaboration with the Austrian decorator Hans Schavernoch and the costume designer Daniel Ogier, were applauded most of the time, such his production Mozart's The Marriage of Figaro which received again Grand Prix of the best lyric production. Created in the Champs-Elysées Theater in 2001, it was three times taken back during the following seven seasons, then in the Wiener Staatsoper where it entered the directory. In contrast, Gounod's Faust at the Bastille Opera in 2011 with Roberto Alagna in the title role was the object of a salvo of negative criticisms, in particular because of the loaded decoration and of his direction considered too "kitsch".

He made a remarked come-back in 2012 with Verdi's Macbeth at the Bordeaux National Opera. This production was his last staging. Jean-Louis Martinoty died from the complications of heart surgery in a hospital in Neuilly-sur-Seine. He was just seventy. Fleur Pellerin, Minister of Culture and Communication, honored him in a press release : "...The Opera world is mourning the death of one who was revealed very early as one of the best directors of his generation ... He was also one of the great administrators of the Paris opera, at the same time guardian of the lyrical tradition and visionary open to modernity [...] He was one of those directors whose art is to remain totally at the service of music's great pieces, giving us totally to see to allow us to better hear them..." . In October 2017, his friend Jean Ristat published a long elegiac poem about his disappearance, Éloge Funèbre de Monsieur Martinoty ('Funeral Praise of Mr Martinoty').

Jean-Louis Martinoty is buried at the cemetery of Joiselle, a village in the Marne department where he lived for forty-five years.

=== General Administrator of the Paris Opera ===
Jean-Louis Martinoty has been General Administrator of the Paris Opera from 1986 to 1989. Appointed to the general surprise on the 12 February 1986 after the resignation of his predecessor, the Italian Massimo Bogianckino elected Florence's mayor, he must have led the house in the very tense context before the opening of Bastille Opera House, characterized by internal battles and significant budget problems.

Passionned by contemporary art, he innovated however many times during his mandate:

- by initiating the "Cartes Blanches", global show set up around an artist painter or a plastician (Karel Appel, Arman, Bernar Venet)
- by collaborating with painters and plasticians as opera decorators (Valerio Adami, Olivier Debré, Dado), practice which was a first at the time and became common thereafter
- by introducing to the repertory the Czech composer Leoš Janáček's two operas, produced in parallel in 1988 in Garnier Opera (Kát'a Kabanová) and in Favart Hall (From the House of the Dead).
- Between 1986 and 1989, 3 operas have been created on the Palais Garnier stage : Maurice Ohana's La Celestine in a Jorge Lavelli production, Busoni's Doktor Faust and Hork Höller's Le Maître et Marguerite from the Bugalkov's novel, critic's prize in Germany. It is also under his mandate in January 1987 that Lully's Atys was produced at the Comic Opera, staged by Jean-Marie Villégier.

== Opera productions ==
- 1975 : A Midsummer 's Night Dream by Benjamin Britten, Strasbourg Opera
- 1975 : La Perichole by Jacques Offenbach, Strasbourg Opera
- 1978 : Idomeneo by Mozart, Lyon Opera
- 1979 : Ercole Amante by Francesco Cavalli, conductor Michel Corboz, Lyon
- 1980 : Semele by Handel, Karlsruhe Badisches Staatstheater
- 1980 : Ecouter-Mourir, music and script Nguyên-Thiên Dao, Avignon – Cloître des Célestins
- 1981 : David et Jonathas by Marc-Antoine Charpentier, conductor Michel Corboz, Lyon Opera
- 1981 : La Bohème by Giacomo Pucchini, decors and costumes Pet Halmen, Lyon Opera
- 1982 : L'incoronazione of Poppea by Monteverdi, conductor Jean-Claude Malgoire, Tourcoing Atelier Lyrique
- 1982 : Les Boreades by Jean-Philippe Rameau, conductor John-Eliot Gardiner, Aix-En-Provence Festival
- 1983 : Racine(s) by Jean Racine, scenography Olivier Debré, costumes Daniel Ogier
- 1984 : Madama Butterfly by Giacomo Pucchini, conductor Hans Gierster, Lyon Opera
- 1985 : Ariadne auf Naxos by Richard Strauss, conductor Jeffrey Tate, decors Hans Schavernoch, Covent Garden
- 1985 : L'heure espagnole by Maurice Ravel, conductor Philippe Nahon, decors Arman, Opera-Comique
- 1985 : Gianni Schicchi by Puccini, conductor Marcello Panni, decors Hans Schavernoch, Opera-Comique
- 1987 : The Flying Dutchman by Richard Wagner, conductor Marek Janowski, Garnier Opera
- 1987 : Il trittico by Puccini, conductor Marcello Panni, decors Hans Schavernoch, Opera-Comique
- 1988 : Orpheus in the Underworld by Offenbach, conductor Lothar Zagrosek, decors Bernard Arnould, Garnier Opera
- 1988 : Tarare by Salieri, conductor Jean-Claude Malgoire, Schwetzingen Festival
- 1989 : Der Rosenkavalier by Richard Strauss, conductor Georg Schmöhe, Champ-Elysées Theater
- 1990 : L'heure espagnole by Maurice Ravel and El retablo de maese Pedro by Manuel de Falla, conductor Jacques Mercier, Marseille Opera
- 1990 : The Gipsy Baron by Johann Strauss, conductor Nikolaus Harnoncourt, Zurich Opera
- 1991 : Alceste by Lully, conductor Jean-Claude Malgoire, decors Hans Schavernoch, costumes Daniel Ogier, Champs-Elysées Theater and Royal Opera of Versailles
- 1993 : Mefistofele by Arrigo Boito, decors Jacques Brissot, Bâle Opera
- 1993 : Tamerlano by Georg Friedrich Handel, decors Dado, Badisches Staatstheater, Karlsruhe
- 1993 : Boris Godunov by Mussorgski, conductor Alain Lombard, Palais des Sports of Bordeaux
- 1994 : L'Opera seria by Leopold Gassmann, conductor René Jacobs, Schwetzingen Festival and Deutsche Oper Berlin
- 1994-1995 : Der Ring des Nibelungen by Richard Wagner, Karlsruhe
- 1996 : L'Argia by Cesti, conductor René Jacobs, Innsbruck Festival
- 1999 : La vida breve by Manuel de Falla and Il Tabarro by Puccini, decors Hans Schavernoch, Marseille opera
- 2001 : La Traviata by Verdi, conductor Arthur Fagen, Montpellier opera
- 2001 : Juditha triumphans by Vivaldi, Montpellier opera
- 2001 : The Marriage of Figaro by Mozart, conductor René Jacobs, decors Hans Schavernoch, Champs-Elysées theater
- 2002 : Une fête chez Rabelais with the ensemble Clément-Janequin, Bouffes du Nord and Tourcoing Atelier Lyrique
- 2002 : The little prince by Richard Cocciante, decors Hans Schavernoch, costumes Jean-Charles de Castelbajac, Casino de Paris
- 2003 : Don Pasquale from Donizetti, conductor Yves Abel, Deutsche Oper Berlin
- 2004 : Faust by Gounod, conductor Yves Abel; Teatro San Carlo of Naples
- 2005 : Bianca e Falliero, conductor Renato Palumbo, Rossini Festival of Pesaro
- 2007 : Pelleas et Melisande by Claude Debussy, conductor Bernard Haitink, decors Hans Schavernoch, Champs- Elysées Theater and Opéra de Lille
- 2008 : Thésée by Lully, conductor Emmanuelle HaÏm, decors Hans Schavernoch, costumes Daniel Ogier, Champs-Elysées Theater
- 2008 : Andrea Chénier by Umberto Giordano, conductor Paolo Olmi, decors Bernard Arnould, costumes Daniel Ogier, Nancy Opera
- 2009 : Carmen by Georges Bizet, conductor Yutaka Sado, decors Hans Schavernoch, tour in Japan
- 2010 : Don Giovanni by Mozart, conductor Franz Welser-Möst, decors Hans Schavernoch, Wiener Staatsoper
- 2011 : The Marriage of Figaro by Mozart, conductor Franz Welser-Möst, decors Hans Schavernoch, Wiener Staatsoper
- 2011 : Faust by Gounod, conductor Alain Altinoglu, Bastille Opera
- 2012 : Macbeth by Verdi, conductor Kwamé Ryan, decors Bernard Arnould, costumes Daniel Ogier,

== Awards ==
- "Prix Claude Rostand" for David et Jonathas by Marc-Antoine Charpentier at the Opera Lyon, season 1980/1981
- "Prix Claude Rostand" for L'incoronazione of Poppea by Monteverdi at the Tourcoing Atelier Lyric, season 1981/1982
- "Grand Prix de la meilleure production lyrique" for Les Boreades by Jean-Philippe Rameau at the Aix-En-Provence Festival, season 1982/1983
- "Grand Prix de la meilleure production lyrique" for The marriage of Figaro by Mozart at the Champs-Elysées Theater, season 2001/2002
