= Silvio Berti =

Italian politician

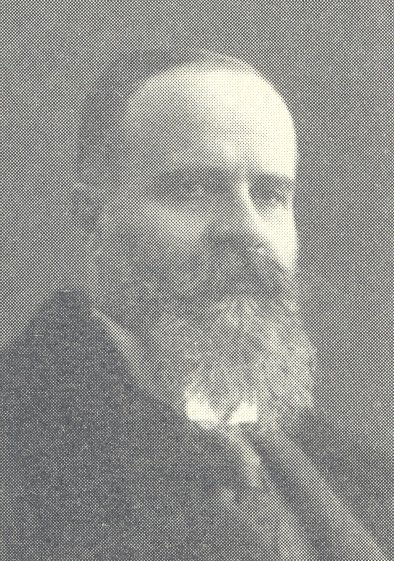
Silvio Berti

Silvio Berti (31 January 1856 – 29 July 1930) was an Italian freemason, politician and lawyer. He was the 7th mayor of Florence.

| Preceded by Piero Torrigiani | Mayor of Florence; 1902–1903 | Succeeded by Ippolito Niccolini |
