= Luciano Bausi =

Italian politician and lawyer (1921–1995)

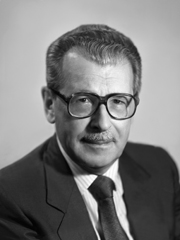

Senator of the Republic
- In office 1976–1992
- Constituency: Florence 1

Undersecretary of State for Justice
- In office 26 February 1984 – 3 March 1987
- Preceded by: Giuseppe Gargani
- Succeeded by: Franco Castiglione

Mayor of Florence
- In office 15 September 1970 – 12 September 1974
- Succeeded by: Giancarlo Zoli
- In office 3 November 1967 – 29 April 1969
- Preceded by: Piero Bargellini

Personal details
- Born: 14 June 1921 Florence, Kingdom of Italy
- Died: 20 February 1995 (aged 73) Florence, Italy
- Party: Christian Democracy
- Occupation: Lawyer

Luciano Bausi (14 June 1921 – 20 February 1995) was an Italian lawyer and politician of Christian Democracy. He served twice as mayor of Florence (1967–1969 and 1970–1974), as a senator of the Italian Republic from 1976 to 1992, and as Undersecretary of State for Justice from 1984 to 1987 in the governments of Bettino Craxi.
