= Elio Gabbuggiani =

Italian politician (1925–1999)

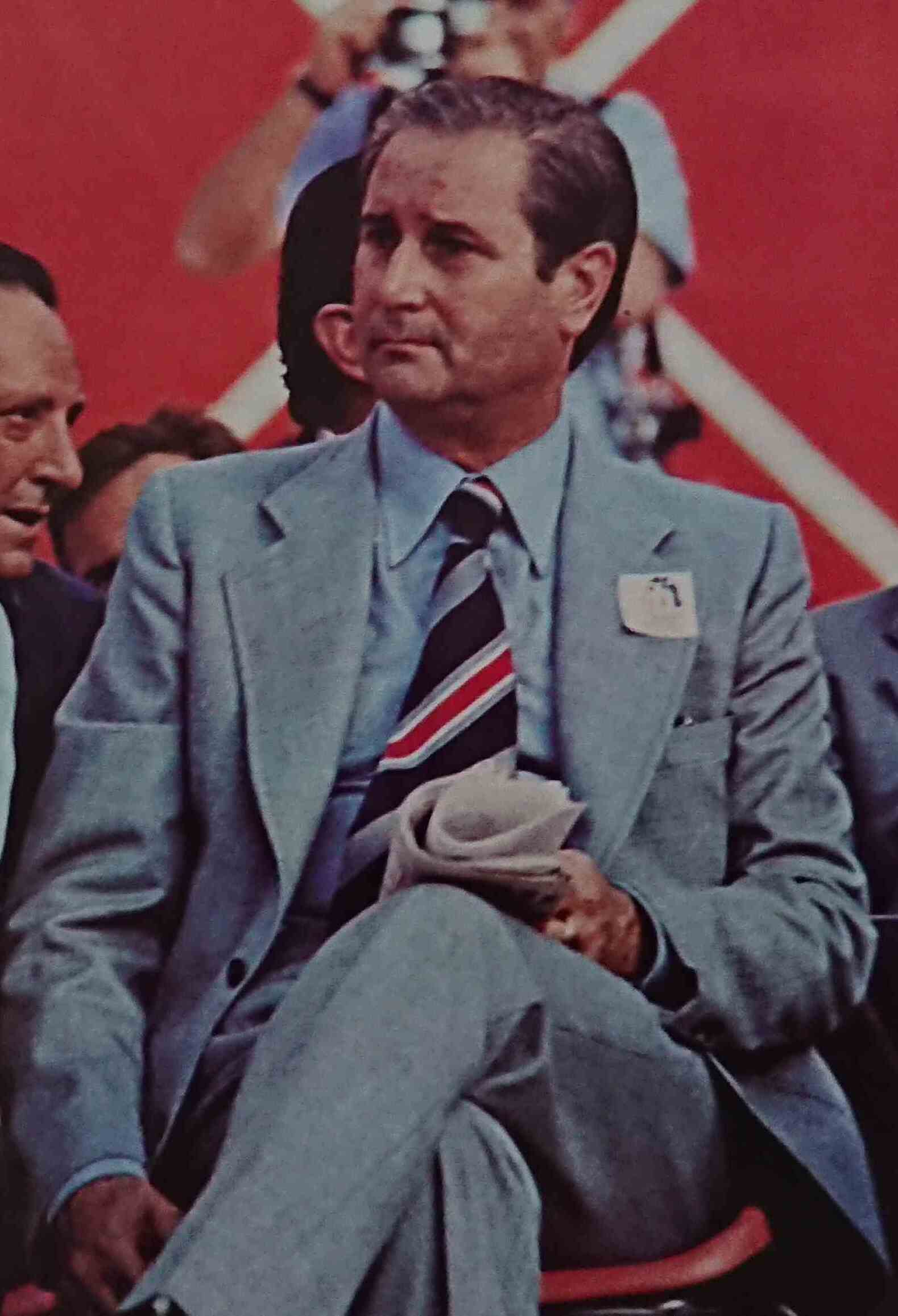

Member of the Provincial Council of Florence
- In office 1960–1970

President of the Province of Florence
- In office 9 March 1962 – 12 July 1970
- Preceded by: Mario Fabiani
- Succeeded by: Luigi Tassinari

Member of the Regional Council of Tuscany
- In office 12 July 1970 – 22 July 1975

President of the Regional Council of Tuscany
- In office 13 July 1970 – 22 July 1975
- Preceded by: Office created
- Succeeded by: Loretta Montemaggi

Mayor of Florence
- In office 22 July 1975 – 5 January 1983
- Preceded by: Giancarlo Zoli
- Succeeded by: Alessandro Bonsanti

Member of the Chamber of Deputies
- In office 1983–1992

Personal details
- Born: 17 June 1925 San Piero a Sieve, Province of Florence, Kingdom of Italy
- Died: 24 March 1999 (aged 73) Florence, Tuscany, Italy
- Party: Italian Communist Party

Elio Gabbuggiani (17 June 1925 – 24 March 1999) was an Italian politician who served as president of the Province of Florence (1962–1970), president of the Regional Council of Tuscany (1970–1975), mayor of Florence (1975–1983), and Deputy (1983–1992).
