= Massimo Bogianckino =

Italian politician

Massimo Bogianckino (10 November 1922 – 8 December 2009) was an Italian pianist, artistic director, and politician.

== Life ==
Born in Rome of Romanian origin on his father's side, descendant on his mother's side from the family of Gabriele D'Annunzio, Bogianckino studied humanities and in the meantime studied the piano with Alfredo Casella and Alfred Cortot, graduating from the Conservatorio di Musica Santa Cecilia. He began his career as a concert performer and composer, but later preferred the path of teaching. He taught piano at the Carnegie Institute of Pittsburgh (now Carnegie Mellon University) in 1950 and 1951, then returned to Italy first at the conservatory of Pesaro and then in Rome where he conducted the Accademia Filarmonica Romana between 1960 and 1963.

Between 1967 and 1994 he taught the history of music (with periods of leave), at the University of Perugia, where he later became director of the Institute of Medieval and Modern Art History.

In 1963 he was appointed artistic director of the Teatro dell'Opera di Roma, then went on to direct the Teatro Comunale di Firenze. In 1968 he directed the Festival dei Due Mondi in Spoleto and was later invited by the French Minister of Culture Jack Lang to hold the post of general director of the Paris Opera between 1983 and 1985.

A member of the Italian Socialist Party, Bogianckino was elected Mayor of Florence on September 24, 1985, to lead a council dominated by the PCI, the PSI, the PSDI and the PLI. He remained in office until 1989, when he resigned for health reasons.

He returned to direct the Teatro Comunale in Florence between 1990 and 1994. In 1994 he was called to direct the Accademia Filarmonica Romana, a post he held until 1997.

Bogianckino died on December 8, 2009, at the age of 87.

== Bibliography ==
- R. Sabatini (2016). Musica in Umbria (in Italian). Morlacchi. ISBN 978-88-6074-799-0.

Preceded by Lando Conti	Mayor of Florence; 1985–1989	Succeeded by Giorgio Morales
Preceded by Alain Lombard, Georges-François Hirsch	director of the Paris Opera; 1983–1985	Succeeded by Jean-Louis Martinoty
