= Tommaso Corsini =

Italian politician

Tommaso Corsini (28 February 1835 – 22 May 1919) was an Italian politician. He was born in and was mayor of Florence. He served in the Senate of the Kingdom of Italy. He died in Marsiliana, province of Grosseto, Tuscany.

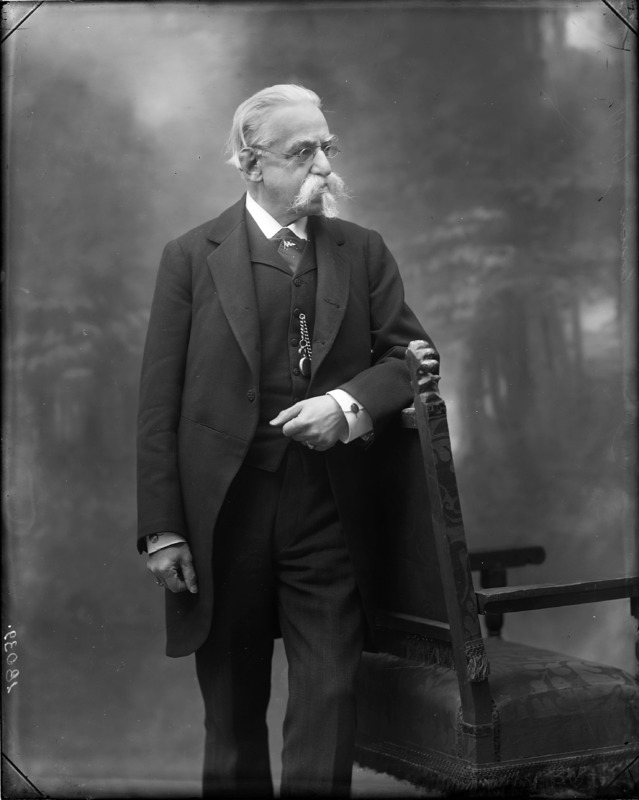
Tommaso Corsini, was an Italian politician

== Honors ==
- Order of Saints Maurice and Lazarus
- Order of the Crown of Italy
- Order of Saint Stanislaus (Russian Empire)
- Order of Saint Joseph (Grand Duchy of Tuscany)

Preceded by Ubaldino Peruzzi	Mayor of Florence; 1880–1886	Succeeded by Piero Torrigiani

== See also ==
- List of Italians
