= Lelio Lagorio =

Italian politician (1925-2017)

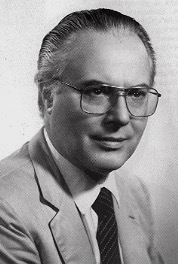

Mayor of Florence
- In office 15 February 1965 – 19 November 1965
- Preceded by: Giorgio La Pira
- Succeeded by: Piero Bargellini

President of Tuscany
- In office 28 July 1970 – 26 September 1978
- Preceded by: Established office
- Succeeded by: Mario Leone

Minister of Defence
- In office 4 April 1980 – 4 August 1983
- Preceded by: Adolfo Sarti
- Succeeded by: Giovanni Spadolini

Member of the Chamber of Deputies
- In office 20 June 1979 – 22 April 1992

Member of the European Parliament
- In office 26 July 1989 – 18 July 1994

Personal details
- Born: 9 November 1925 Trieste, Italy
- Died: 6/7 January 2017 Florence, Italy
- Party: Italian Socialist Party

Lelio Lagorio (9 November 1925 – 6/7 January 2017) was an Italian politician who served as the first President of Tuscany from 1970 until 1978.

== Biography ==
Lagorio was born in Trieste and was a member of the Italian Socialist Party (Partito Socialista Italiano; PSI). He was mayor of Florence from 1964 to 1965, succeeding Giorgio La Pira, and, later, the first president of the Tuscany region (1970–1978).

He was the first PSI politicians to become Minister of Defence in Italy (1980–1983); the Ustica Massacre occurred under his tenure. Later he was minister of Sport and Spectales (1983–1986), President of PSI's Deputies and at the European Parliament (1986–1994) and vice-president of the Union of European Community Socialist Parties (1990–1992).

Lagorio also wrote political and historical essays (including L'Ora di Austerlitz, about his period as Minister of Defence), and edited the Florentine magazine Città & Regione.

He died in Florence on 6 January or 7 January 2017.

== Sources ==
- Mola, Aldo Alessandro (1993). "Lelio Lagorio". Il Parlamento Italiano. Storia parlamentare e politica dell'Italia, Vol. XXIII. Milan.
- Tajani, Antonio (1982). Il Granduca. Lagorio: un socialista Ministro della Difesa. Milan.
