= Piero Torrigiani =

Italian politician

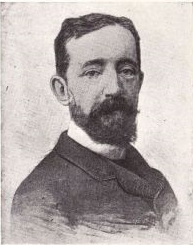
Piero Torrigiani

Piero Torrigiani (1 June 1846 – 16 June 1920) was an Italian politician. He was born in Florence. He served as mayor of his hometown twice. He was a recipient of the Order of Saints Maurice and Lazarus and the Order of the Crown of Italy.

== See also ==
- List of Italians

Preceded by Tommaso Corsini	Mayor of Florence; 1886–1889	Succeeded by Francesco Guicciardini
Preceded by Francesco Guicciardini	Mayor of Florence; 1891–1901	Succeeded by Silvio Berti
