= Il Frontespizio =

Literary magazine in Italy (1929–1940)

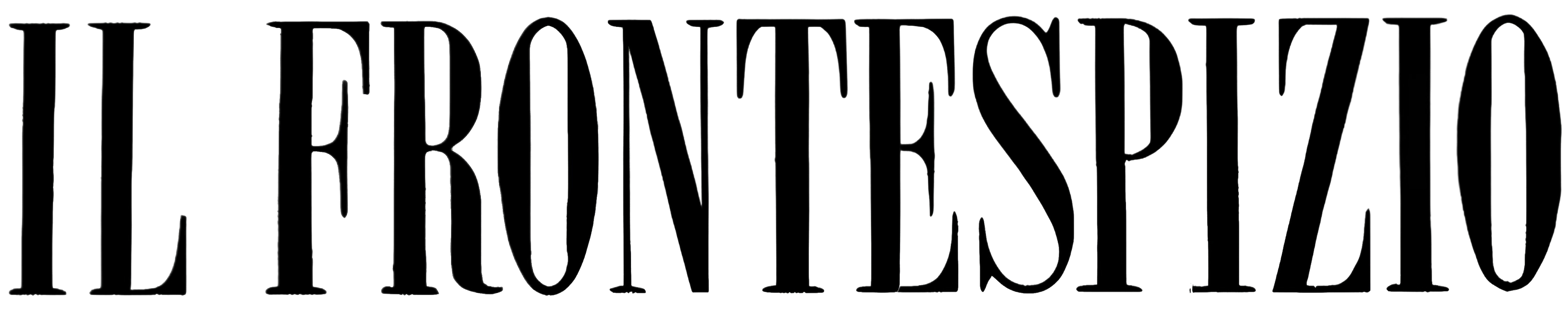
- Categories: Literary magazine
- Founder: Enrico Lucatello; Piero Bargellini
- Founded: May 1929
- Final issue: December 1940
- Country: Kingdom of Italy
- Based in: Florence
- Language: Italian

Il Frontespizio (Italian: The Frontispiece) was an art and literary magazine, which had a Catholic perspective. The magazine existed between 1929 and 1940 and was based in Florence, Italy.

== History and profile ==
Il Frontespizio was first published in May 1929. The founders were Enrico Lucatello and Piero Bargellini. Giovanni Papini was also instrumental in the establishment of the magazine. The headquarters of Il Frontespizio was in Florence. From August 1929 the magazine became monthly, but it rarely published double issues. Vallecchi was the publisher of the magazine from July 1930 to its closure in 1940.

The founding editor was Enrico Lucatello, who was succeeded by Piero Bargellini in the post. Giuseppe de Luca, a Catholic priest, was among the regular contributors and served as the editor of Il Frontespizio. Although it targeted Catholic intellectuals, who had been alienated from public life since the Unification of Italy in 1861, the goal of the magazine was not to disseminate Catholic art. Instead, it aimed at being an alternative to avant-gardism and fascist culture in Italy. In addition, Il Frontespizio adopted an anti-Semitic approach. The magazine introduced the Hermetic poetry in Italy through the work by Carlo Bo, a literary critic, Mario Luzi and Piero Bigongiari. The magazine also covered the work by Italian sculptors, including Bartolini, Carlo Carrà, Felice Casorati, De Pisis, Mino Maccari, Manzu, Giorgio Morandi, Ottone Rosai, Semeghini, Severini, Soffici, and Lorenzo Viani.

Il Frontespizio was the recipient of the best graphic work award at the Milan Triennale in 1935. The magazine ended publication in December 1940.
