= Alessandro Bonsanti =

Italian writer and politician

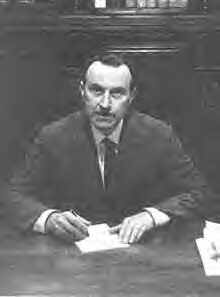

Mayor of Florence
- In office 14 March 1983 – 18 February 1984
- Preceded by: Elio Gabbuggiani
- Succeeded by: Lando Conti

Personal details
- Born: 25 November 1904 Florence, Kingdom of Italy
- Died: 18 February 1984 (aged 79) Florence, Italy
- Resting place: Cimitero delle Porte Sante
- Party: PRI
- Occupation: Writer; politician

Alessandro Bonsanti (25 November 1904 – 18 February 1984) was a writer and Italian politician.

== Early life ==
Alessandro Bonsanti, writer, was born in Florence. Very young, after completing his studies, he moved to work in Milan, where he worked for three years as an employee at a local bank, collaborating in the magazine La Fiera Literaria, where he published his first Brigants story in Maremma.

== Career ==
Returning to Florence, he came into contact with the literary environment that animated Solaria (the European magazine, which existed from 1926 to 1936), where he was a collaborator and director, publishing the military narrative (1927), The loving servant (1929), and the whims of 'driana (1934), republished in distant Racconti (1962), texts of the past that have to do with a distant social history. In 1937 Bonsanti founded and assumed the direction of publishing for a magazine that collected the inheritance of Solaria.

In 1941 he took over as la direzione del Gabinetto scientifìco-letterario Vieusseux (Director of the Vieusseux Scientific-Literature Cabinet), left vacant by Eugenio Montale. This was an assignment that Bonsanti held with great willingness and firmness, making for almost forty years a promoter of various cultural initiatives.

During the war, he published two books: Dialoghi e altre prose (Dialogues and Other Prose) (1940) and Introduzione al gran viaggio (Introduction to the Great Trip) (1944). The following year he assumed the position of Director of Il Mondo, which he himself founded with Eugenio Montale and Arturo Loria. Other books to remember are: La vipera e il toro (1955) and cavalli di bronzo (1956).

In recent years Bonsanti's interests were also addressed to active politics; in this period he was approaching the Republican Party of Spadolini and in 1983 was elected mayor of Florence, head of a pentapartito junta, which was not completed due to his death in 1984.

He was nominated for the Strega Prize.

== Personal life and death ==
His daughter Sandra, a journalist, was a member of the Republic.

He died on 18 February 1984 and is buried in the Cimitero delle Porte Sante in Florence.

== Main works ==
- La serva amorosa, Firenze, 1929
- I capricci dell'Adriana, Firenze, 1934
- Racconto militare, Firenze, 1937
- Dialoghi e altre prose, Firenze, 1940
- Introduzione al gran viaggio, Roma, 1944
- La vipera e il toro, Firenze, 1955
- Sopra alcuni personaggi eventuali, Sarzana, 1956
- I cavalli di bronzo, Firenze, 1956
- Racconti lontani, Milano, 1962
- La buca di San Colombario, 4 vol., Milano, 1964–1973
- La nuova stazione di Firenze, Milano, 1965
- Teatro domestico, Milano, 1970
- Portolani d'agosto, Milano, 1978
