= Lando Conti =

Italian politician (1933–1986)

Mayor of Florence
- In office 26 March 1984 – 26 September 1985
- Preceded by: Alessandro Bonsanti
- Succeeded by: Massimo Bogianckino

Personal details
- Born: 1 November 1933
- Died: 10 February 1986 (aged 52)
- Party: PRI

Lando Conti (1 November 1933 – 10 February 1986) was an Italian politician who served as Mayor of Florence. He was assassinated by the Red Brigades terrorist group, firing the period of far left and far right terrorism in Italy commonly referred to as the "Years of Lead".

== Biography ==
Conti was the mayor of Florence from 26 March 1984 until 26 September 1985. He was a member of the Italian Republican Party.

On 10 February 1986 he was shot dead by the Red Brigades. He was killed in the hills outside the city. The Red Brigades had not claimed responsibility for a political murder since the death of socialist economist Ezio Tarantelli on 27 March 1985.

Conti is buried at the Cimitero di Trespiano. In 2000 his family tomb at the historic cemetery was vandalized.
