= Ippolito Niccolini =

Italian businessman and politician

Ippolito Niccolini (3 January 1848 – 8 January 1919) was an Italian businessman and politician. He was the 8th mayor of Florence, Italy.

Preceded by Silvio Berti	Mayor of Florence; 1904–1907	Succeeded by Francesco Sangiorgi

== Biography ==
Elected to the Chamber of Deputies (Kingdom of Italy) in 1890 for the 17th legislature, he was re-elected for four consecutive terms until 1904, when he resigned following his appointment as a senator of the Kingdom of Italy.

Elected to the Florence City Council in 1902, he later had the opportunity, as senior councilor, to serve as mayor of Mayor of Florence from October 24 to November 25, 1903. He was then elected Mayor of Florence on March 15, 1904, a position he held until June 25, 1907.
