= Piero Bargellini =

Italian politician, writer and journalist

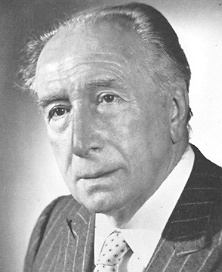

Mayor of Florence
- In office 1 August 1966 – 3 November 1967
- Preceded by: Lelio Lagorio
- Succeeded by: Luciano Bausi

Member of the Senate
- In office 1968–1972

Member of the Chamber of Deputies
- In office 1972–1976

Personal details
- Born: 5 August 1897 Florence, Tuscany, Italy
- Died: 28 February 1980 (aged 82) Florence, Tuscany, Italy
- Party: Christian Democracy
- Profession: Surveyor, journalist

Piero Francesco Bargellini (5 August 1897 – 28 February 1980) was an Italian politician, writer and journalist, who served as mayor of Florence (1966–1967), Senator (1968–1972) and Deputy (1972–1976).

== Biography ==
In 1929 Bargellini founded, together with writers Carlo Betocchi and Nicola Lisi, the literary magazine Il Frontespizio. His own largely popularizing writing covered studies of the figurative arts, biographies of saints and poets, histories of places or events especially relating to Tuscany and Florence. Between 1945 and 1952 he published Pian dei Giullari, a twelve-volume history of Italian literature. He worked for much of his life as a teacher in Florence. Elected mayor of Florence in 1966, he became a Senator (1968–1972) and a Deputy (1972–1976) in the Italian Parliament.

Political offices
Preceded by Lelio Lagorio	Mayor of Florence; 1966–1967	Succeeded by Luciano Bausi
