= Eike Schmidt =

German art historian (born 1968)

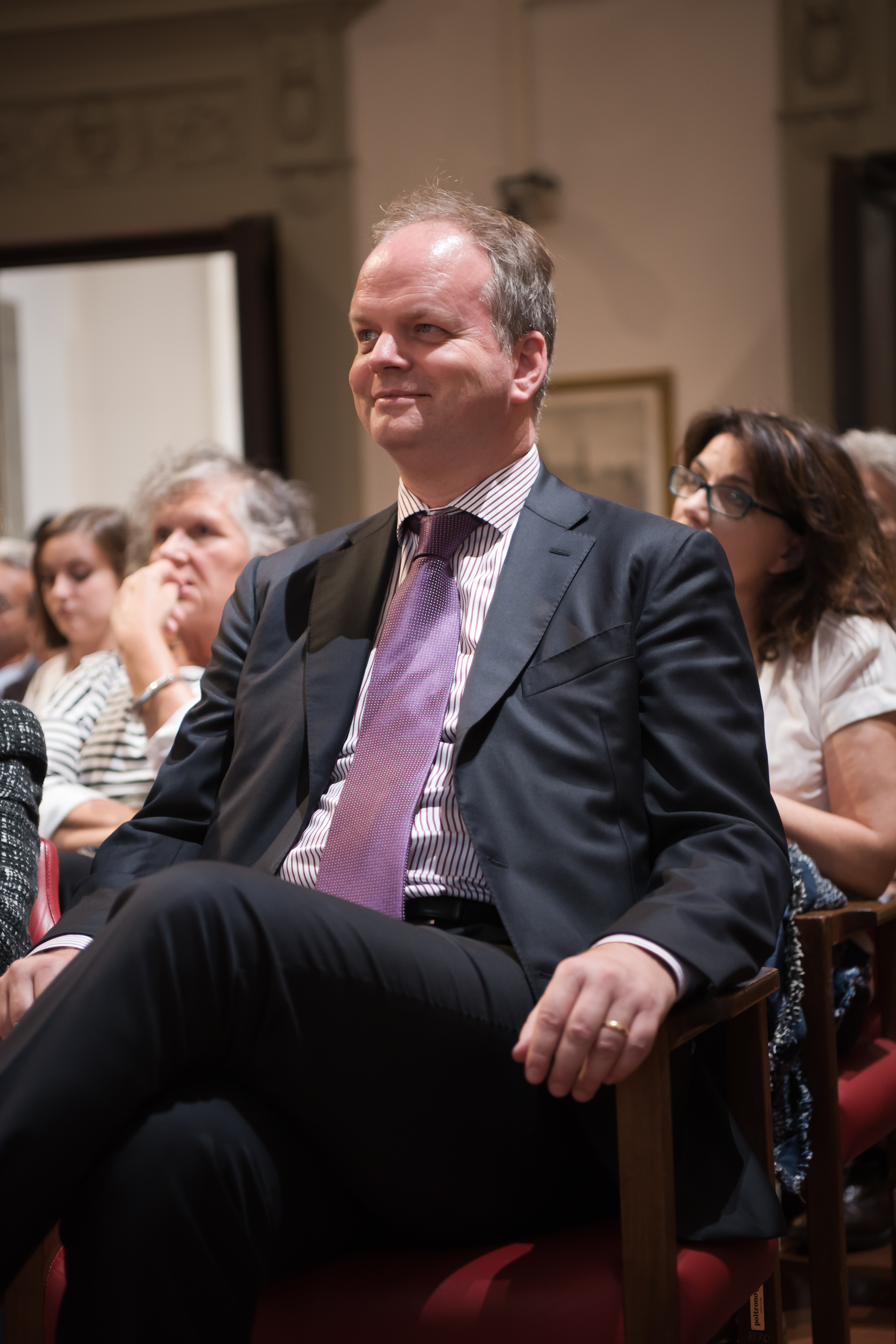
Schmidt in 2016

Eike Dieter Schmidt (born 22 April 1968) is a German-Italian art historian and politician. He is the current director of the Museo di Capodimonte, after having served in the same capacity for the Uffizi in Florence from 2015 to 2024.

== Life ==
Born in Freiburg, he studied medieval and modern art at the University of Heidelberg. In the 1990s he studied at the University of Bologna on an Erasmus Scheme bursary. He then studied at the Kunsthistorisches Institut in Florenz until 2001, again on a bursary.

He then moved to the US, becoming a curator at the National Gallery of Art in Washington, D.C. in 2001 and then at the J. Paul Getty Museum in Los Angeles from 2006 to 2008. He then moved to London to become its European departmental director for sculpture and art.

In 2009 he gained his doctorate at the University of Heidelberg with a dissertation on "The Medici Ivory Sculpture Collection in the 17th Century". From 2009 to 2015 he was director of the Department of Sculpture, Decorative Arts and Textiles at the Minneapolis Institute of Art, planning and curating several exhibitions and creating a sub-department of Jewish Art. He also curated Diafane passioni, a major exhibition on Baroque sculpture at Florence's Palazzo Pitti in 2013.

He was a member of the valuation commission for the Maastricht International Antiques Fair from 2010 to 2015. In 2015, he was appointed director of the Uffizi, being the first ever non-Italian director of the Florence museum.

In 2023 he became an Italian citizen. Later in 2024, he left his role in charge of the Uffizi, being named in charge of the Museo di Capodimonte.

On 6 April 2024, Schmidt announced his candidacy for Mayor of Florence for the upcoming local elections for the centre-right coalition. He cited amongst his priorities tackling overtourism and fast food stands in the city. In the first round on 8 June, he received 32,86% of the vote, coming second after center-left candidate Sara Funaro with 43.17%. He and Funaro proceeded into the runoff on 23 June, where he received just 39,44% of the vote, and became the leader of the opposition.

Schmidt is married to art historian Roberta Bartoli. As wedding presents, in 2012 the Minneapolis Institute of Art received Ernst Gamperl's Bowl and Cornelis Bega's The Amorous Couple.
