= Giorgio La Pira =

Italian Catholic and politician (1904–1977)

Venerable Giorgio La Pira TOSD
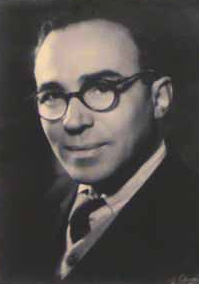
- La Pira in 1946

Mayor of Florence
- In office 7 March 1961 – 15 February 1965
- Preceded by: Special Commissioner
- Succeeded by: Lelio Lagorio
- In office 5 July 1951 – 27 June 1957
- Preceded by: Mario Fabiani
- Succeeded by: Special Commissioner

Member of the Chamber of Deputies
- In office 5 July 1976 – 5 November 1977
- Constituency: Florence
- In office 12 June 1958 – 18 April 1961
- Constituency: Florence
- In office 8 May 1948 – 22 December 1952
- Constituency: Florence

Member of the Constituent Assembly
- In office 25 June 1946 – 31 January 1948
- Constituency: Florence

Personal details
- Born: Giorgio La Pira; 9 January 1904 Pozzallo, Kingdom of Italy
- Died: 5 November 1977 (aged 73) Florence, Italy
- Resting place: Basilica di San Marco, Florence, Italy
- Party: Christian Democracy
- Education: University of Messina
- Profession: Teacher

Giorgio La Pira, TOSD (religious name Raimondo; 9 January 1904 – 5 November 1977) was an Italian Catholic politician who served as the mayor of Florence. He also served as a deputy for Christian Democracy (DC), the ruling party of post-war Italy, and participated in the assembly that wrote the Italian Constitution following World War II. In his public and private life he was a tireless champion of peace and human rights who worked for the betterment of the poor and disenfranchised. La Pira belonged to the Third Order of Saint Dominic. From 1934 until his death, he lived in the San Marco complex.

La Pira was a staunch advocate for peace and made several trips to the East to places such as China and the Soviet Union, which were sometimes deemed to be controversial in the Cold War era. Those trips were undertaken to discuss peace ventures and ends to conflict with La Pira also prioritizing ecumenism as a reason for visiting Moscow where he often met with members of the Russian Orthodox Church. La Pira's cause for sainthood opened in the 1980s, and he was a Servant of God. He became titled as venerable on 5 July 2018 when Pope Francis confirmed that he had lived a life of heroic virtue.

== Life ==
=== Education ===
La Pira was born on 9 January 1904 in Pozzallo, Ragusa, Sicily, to a Sicilian packing-house worker. He was the first of six children born to Gaetano La Pira (1870–1937) and Angela Occhipinti (1876–1943). He was baptized on the following 7 February with his maternal uncle Luigi (1880–1973) as his godfather. His maternal aunt was Settimia Machi Bartolini (1888–1945). His siblings were Salvatore (1905–1975), Giuseppina (1908–1990), Giovannino (1912–2003), Maria Cristina (1913–1980), and Ernesto (1915–2005). One close friend was Salvatore Quasimodo, who was a future Nobel prize-winner for literature, and another friend was Giuseppe Lazzati. He often read Dante Alighieri as well as Plato and Saint Thomas More. La Pira attended the Giacinto Pandolfi school from 1909 to 1913 as part of his education and entered the Antonello Technical-Commercial College from 1914 until 1917.

Throughout 1921, La Pira worked alongside his maternal uncle Luigi so as to contribute towards keeping himself in school. His Catholic upbringing and, in particular, the teachings of Saint Francis of Assisi had a vital role in shaping his political and philosophical beliefs. He saw all that he did and each position he took as an expression of his spiritual beliefs. In 1922, he studied for his high school examination, where he obtained his diploma in Palermo. It was at this time that he often visited the home of Federico Rampolla, who helped him prepare for his final exam in Latin and Greek. It was also where he met Federico's cardinal brother Mariano. It was in 1924 that he experienced a profound religious calling that would forever set the pattern for his life. He studied accounting in Messina (from 1914 to 1922) and received a law degree from the University of Florence in 1925. He became a professor of Roman Law there in 1933, and his openness helped him achieve a cordial relationship with his students.

=== World War II ===
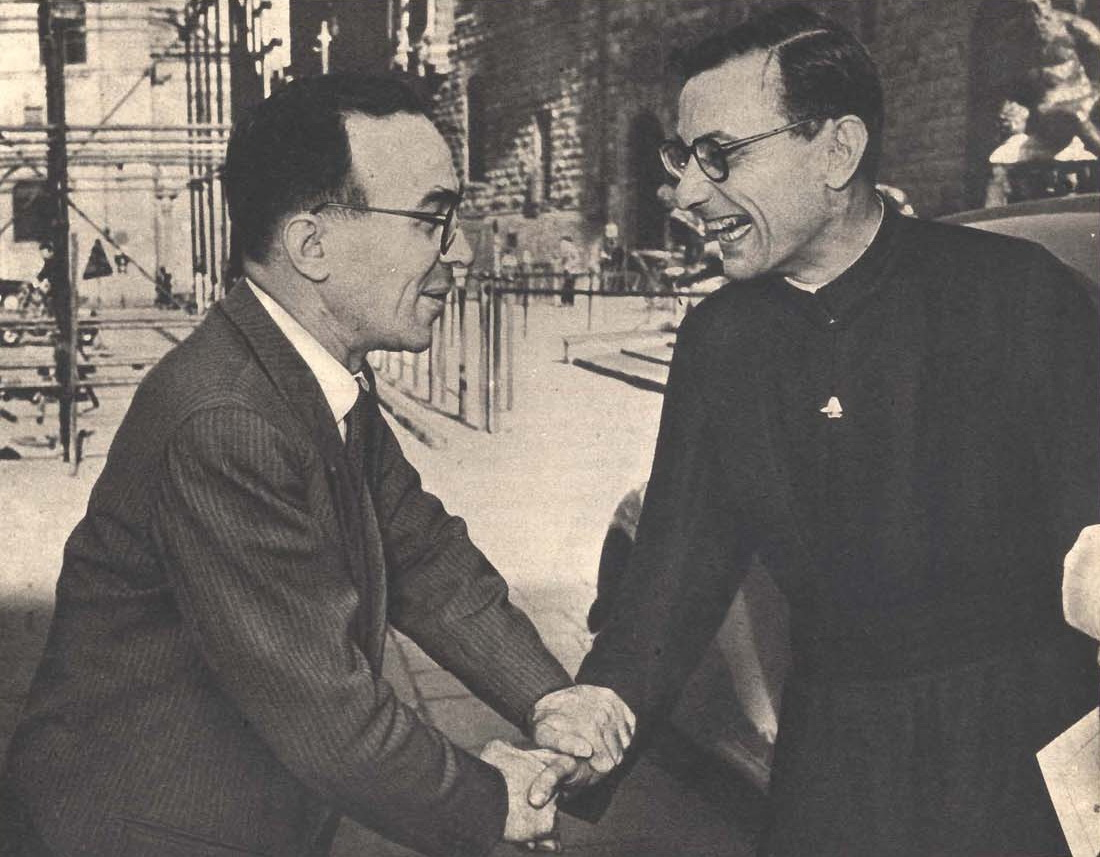
La Pira with Jean Daniélou in June 1953

On the eve of World War II, La Pira founded the review Principi (in English, Principles) which promoted human rights and criticized Italian fascism in an open manner — criticism that became even greater once Benito Mussolini passed the racial laws in 1938 and entered the war in 1940. After Italian police raided his offices on 29 September 1943, La Pira escaped to Siena and then to Rome. On 30 September, the governorship of the Vatican issued him with an identification as a staff member of L'Osservatore Romano so as to keep him safe. He returned to Florence in September 1944. At a National Congress held in Assisi in 1942, he spoke in praise of "the peace that constructs" and of "the love that rebuilds". La Pira also rejected the criticisms of Luigi Sturzo on an alleged economic statism.

=== Mayor ===
Once the war ended, La Pira set about rebuilding Florence, which was struggling to recover from the destruction the war caused in most Italian cities at the time. As mayor, he steered Florence from the haphazard reconstruction efforts that were evident for other Italian efforts in reconstruction and rehabilitation. He believed that the focus of rebuilding should be self-sufficient neighbourhoods. These neighborhoods centered around local shops and public gardens as well as around markets and tree-lined streets with schools and churches. The most well-known of these is Isolotto – or the "little island". These revitalized neighbourhoods became the heart and soul of post-war Florence and continue to thrive at present. La Pira led the effort for the reconstruction of bridges such as the Vespucci and Santa Trinita Bridge as well as the Alle Grazie.

Other public works projects included such job-creating projects as the expansion of the water works, a waste system, and public transportation networks. La Pira often used legal loopholes as a means of requisitioning vacant villas for the poor or evicted people, and he also designed low-cost housing. He constructed new schools and refurbished the municipal theatre, as well as repaving streets.

In 1949, Prime Minister Alcide de Gasperi appointed him as the undersecretary for labour in his cabinet alongside La Pira's old friend Amintore Fanfani. La Pira often took an even more active role in job creation. When Florence's oldest industrial plant, "Pignone", threatened to close due to a slump in demand, he persuaded Enrico Mattei – the president and CEO of ENI – to take it over, thus saving more than a thousand jobs (about 1750 workers). ENI later renamed itself as Nuovo Pignone and still operates now as a division of General Electric. Some adversaries – even within his own ranks – accused La Pira of statism or spurious Marxism.

=== Religious life and international ventures ===
La Pira became a professed member of the Third Order of Saint Dominic in 1925 and assumed the name of Fra Raimondo; he viewed his Christian faith as a serious matter and was a devout Christian. It was on 11 December 1927 that he assumed the habit of the Dominicans. Following the war, it was not uncommon to see him in public walking barefoot, having given his shoes and clothing as well as most of his earnings to the poor and downtrodden. La Pira often referred to himself as a "free apostle of the Lord". He also held Cardinal Elia dalla Costa in high esteem which was reciprocal. He visited the cardinal often to exchange views and opinions on current affairs, and it was Dalla Costa who inspired his love of the Bible for interpreting historical occurrences.

It was in 1934 that he first met Giovanni Battista Montini – the future Pope Paul VI – and the two remained firm friends. It was Montini who referred La Pira to Monsignor Raffaele Bensi as a spiritual director and confessor. He was also active in national and international politics. He sought to put Florence on the world stage as a leading hub for peace initiatives and forums. He struck sister city relationships with cities including Rheims and Philadelphia and made U Thant and Charles-Édouard Jeanneret honorary citizens of Florence.

In 1946, La Pira was elected as a member of the Italian Constituent Assembly, in which he had a major role in drafting the Italian Constitution. Despite sometimes intense criticism, La Pira paid several visits to Moscow and China and even Hanoi throughout the Cold War era. Until his death, he promoted issues such as disarmament and the importance of third world development, as well as tolerance among world religions. He hosted five Conferences for Peace and Christian Civilization in the Palazzo Vecchio from 1952 until 1956, and later in 1967 was elected as the president of the World Federation of United Cities. He also invited the President of the World Zionist Organization Nahum Goldmann to hold the World Jewish Congress in Florence in 1964.

In August 1959, La Pira made a visit to the Soviet Union and later visited North Vietnam in 1965, where he travelled to Ho Chi Minh and presented an outline for a peace plan. This laid the groundwork for the accord that later ended the Vietnam War – a war which troubled La Pira. In his 1959 visit to Russia, he visited the Zagorsk Monastery on the outskirts of Moscow and said: "I have come to pray for peace and unity for all people of the world". La Pira supported the decision of Pope John XXIII to convoke the Second Vatican Council and said of it that the pope "has opened his arms to all Christians and all peoples of the world". He also spoke with Metropolitan Nikolai and told him that he visited as a "Marian bridge of prayer between Fátima and Moscow – the Churches of East and West". La Pira had visited Fátima before this visit. He visited Zagorsk Monastery once more in 1973 and met with Patriarch Pimen and Archbishop Nikodim for dialogue on peace.

La Pira never married, and he lived in a bare and unheated cell in the San Marco basilica from 3 June 1935; he had cell number six. In the cold weather, he would bunk in the office of a doctor friend. The Florentine people held him in high regard and esteem and often called him "the saint". But there was one opposition group who named him "La Pirata" (the Pirate) as a play on his name. On 15 May 1956, he travelled to Venice for a conference and the Patriarch of Venice Angelo Roncalli – future Pope John XXIII – invited him to dinner. The cardinal realized it had grown late and allowed La Pira to spend the night in the patriarchate. Roncalli did this in great secret since he had La Pira sleep in the bed that had been that of Pope Pius X when he was the patriarch. Roncalli noted in his journal of that event that he came to "esteem and venerate" La Pira. In 1957, went on a pilgrimage to Israel as well as to Jordan and Egypt while also visiting Paris, Rabat, Tunis and Beirut. On 24 January 1960, he was en route back from Cairo and made a stopover in Istanbul where he met with the Patriarch of Constantinople Athenagoras, who gave him a box of sweetmeats to give to John XXIII. Between 1971 and 1973, he travelled across the globe to places such as Warsaw, Budapest, Jerusalem, Quebec and New York, amongst others. He went to Chile and attempted to stop a coup threatening President Salvador Allende, and he participated in a seminar in Houston.

=== Death ===
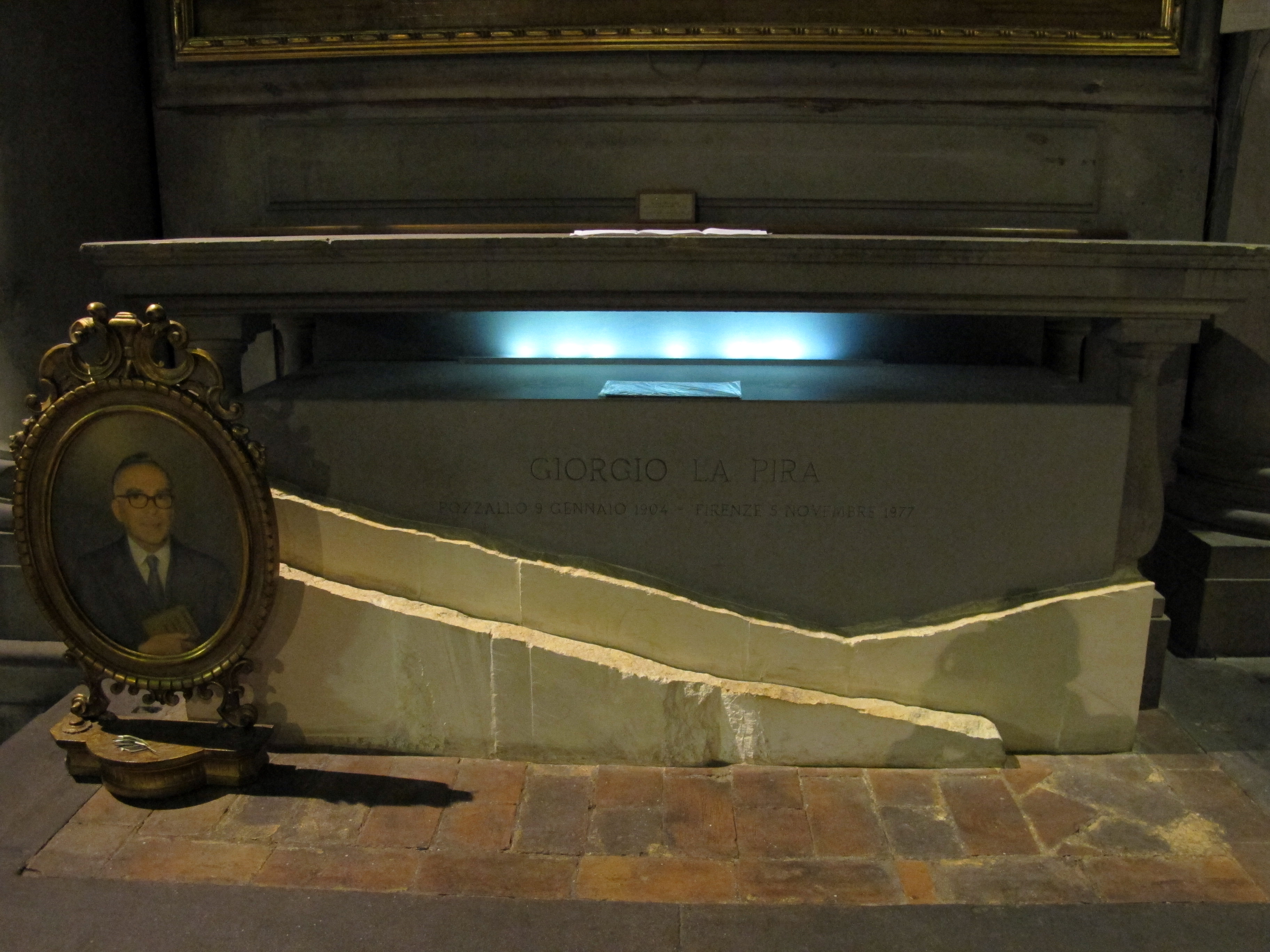
La Pira's tomb in the San Marco basilica in Florence

La Pira died on 5 November 1977 in the Clinic of the English Sisters in via Cherubini. Cardinal Giovanni Benelli blessed his remains not long after La Pira had died, and a Mass was later said in the death room. His good friend Giulio Andreotti learned on 5 February that his health had worsened and so set off at once for Florence to be with La Pira. Paul VI honoured La Pira in his Angelus address in Saint Peter's Square on 6 November.

== Legacy ==
In October 1963, Dorothy Day referred to La Pira as "a saint in politics" who "took the unused homes of the rich to make homes for the poor". La Pira's close friend Pope Paul VI characterized him as "the example every Christian ought to keep firmly in mind during his earthly passage towards the kingdom of God" in his General Audience address on 9 November 1977. Pope John Paul II later remarked that La Pira was "an exemplary lay Christian". Cardinal Stanisław Ryłko hailed La Pira for his courage to express and show witness to his faith in the exercise of a public office. The cardinal referred to La Pira as "a Christian of unsurpassable coherence", whose faith was "the axis of all of his life".

On 1 November 2004, Pope John Paul II sent a letter to Cardinal Ennio Antonelli for the occasion of the centennial of La Pira's birth and recalled La Pira's "great intellectual and moral energy, strengthened and refined by extensive daily study, thought, ascesis and prayer". The pope further praised La Pira for his fusion of politics and faith while remembering that La Pira liked the motto contemplate aliis tradere which he had learned from Saint Thomas Aquinas. Cardinal Joseph Ratzinger – future Pope Benedict XVI – hailed La Pira in an address to the National Association of Italian Local Authorities on 26 April 2004 as "an eminent figure in politics" who "worked for the cause of fraternal existence among nations" and attempted to promote the "basic good in various spheres" of life whether it be politics or culture.

The centennial of La Pira's birth was celebrated at the palace of Montecittorio on 25 February 2004, in which former prime minister and La Pira's good friend Giulio Andreotti gave an address to those gathered. Andreotti said that the former King of Morocco Hassan II had asked him whether, as a Muslim, he could give witness in La Pira's beatification cause since the king had been fascinated with La Pira's long-sightedness. The king had met La Pira at his cell in San Marco, and La Pira's humble nature fascinated Hassan II more so. Andreotti was once in China on the banks of the River Kwai at a convent where a nun had asked him: "How is La Pira?" Also in attendance at this celebration was the Italian President Carlo Azeglio Ciampi, as well as Cardinals Antonelli and Carlo Maria Martini. Future Italian Prime Minister Matteo Renzi was elected as mayor of Florence on 22 June 2009, and his first official visit was to La Pira's grave.

The Soviet Marxist scholar Teodor Oizerman contested La Pira's claim, made in his 1949 paper on Marxism and Christianity, that "the Communist cosmology is based integrally on the Hegelian" and that Marxist philosophy is reducible to Hegelian speculation expressed through a different set of terms. While Oizerman acknowledged that it was György Lukács and Jean Hyppolite who popularised the identification of Marxism with Hegelianism, he charged La Pira with spreading the anti-Communist notion that Karl Marx's scientific work did not represent proletarian interests and with "falsifying" Marxism by denying that Marx surpassed Hegel in any way. He labelled La Pira "one of the leading propagandists of the Vatican".

== Beatification process ==
The cause for La Pira's beatification commenced in Florence in a diocesan phase that Cardinal Silvano Piovanelli inaugurated on 9 January 1986 and which Cardinal Ennio Antonelli closed two decades later on 4 April 2005. This diocesan process was charged with hearing witness testimonies – which included Hassan II of Morocco – and collecting documents relating to La Pira's life and works. This also included his published and unpublished writings, which required theological approval in order to see if there was a potential contravention of doctrine in them. The formal introduction to the cause came under Pope John Paul II on 22 February 1986, once the Congregation for the Causes of Saints issued the nihil obstat ("nothing against") to the cause and titled La Pira as a Servant of God. Upon the closure of the diocesan process, all documents were sealed in boxes to be sent to the Congregatoin for assessment, where it validated this process on 24 October 2007. The positio was submitted to the Congregation for assessment in 2017. Pope Francis confirmed La Pira's life of heroic virtue on 5 July 2018 and named him as venerable. The postulator for this cause is the Gianni Festa OP.

== Electoral history ==
| Election | House | Constituency | Party | Votes | Result |
|---|---|---|---|---|---|
| 1946 | Constituent Assembly | Florence–Pistoia | DC | 10,879 | Elected |
| 1948 | Chamber of Deputies | Florence–Pistoia | DC | 21,231 | Elected |
| 1958 | Chamber of Deputies | Florence–Pistoia | DC | 35,016 | Elected |
| 1976 | Chamber of Deputies | Florence–Pistoia | DC | 35,175 | Elected |

Source: Elezioni Storico

== See also ==
- List of mayors of Florence

== Published works ==
- La successione ereditaria intestate e contro il testament in diritto romano, Firenze, Vallecchi, 1930.
- L'anima di un apostolo. Vita interior di Ludovico Necchi, Milano, Vita e Pensiero, 1932.
- La nostra vocazione sociale, Roma, AVE, 1945.
- La vita interior di Luigi Moresco, Roma, AVE, 1945.
- Premesse della politica, Firenze, Liberia Editrice Fiorentina, 1945.
- Il valore della persona umana, Milano, Istituto di Propaganda Libraria, 1947.
- Architettura di uno Stato democratico, Roma, Edizione Servire, 1948.
- Istituzioni di Diritto Romano, Firenze, Editrice Universitaria, 1948.
- Marxismo e cristianesimo, due teologie antitetiche, in La filosofia del comunismo. Atti della Settimana di studio indetta dall'Accademia di S. Tommaso, 1949, Torino, Marietti, 1949, pp. 9–18.
  - English translation: Marxism and Christianity: Two Antithetical Theologies, in The Philosophy of Communism, New York, Fordham University Press, 1952, pp. 1–12.
- L'attesa della povera gente, Firenze, Libreria Editrice Fiorentina, 1951.
- Per un architettura Cristiana dello Stato, Firenze, Libreria Editrice Fiorentina, 1954.
- Principi, a cura di Angelo Scivoletto, Firenze, Philosophia, 1955.
- Così in terra come in cielo, Edizioni O.R., Milano, 1970.
- Unità, disarm e pace, prefazione di H. Camara, Firenze, Cultura, 1971.
- Le genesi del sistema nella giurisprudenza romana, Firenze, Setti, 1971.
- Principi, ristampa fotostatica con prefazione di Giorgio La Pira, Firenze, Libreria Editrice Fiorentina, 1974.
