= 1959 Nobel Prize in Literature =

- Salvatore Quasimodo
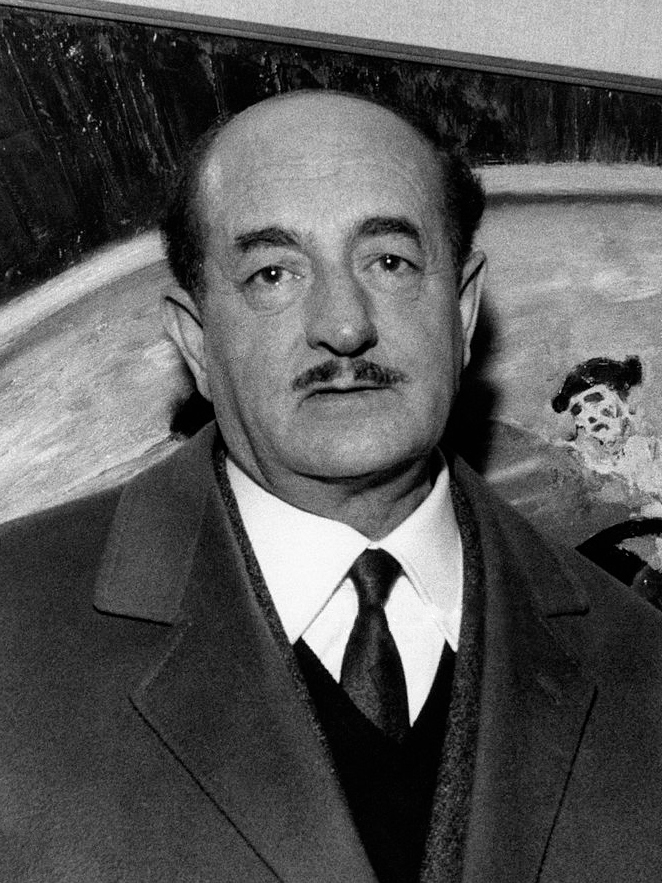
- "for his lyrical poetry, which with classical fire expresses the tragic experience of life in our own times."
- Date: 21 October 1959 (announcement); 10 December 1959 (ceremony)
- Location: Stockholm, Sweden
- Presented by: Swedish Academy
- First award: 1901
- Website: Official website

The 1959 Nobel Prize in Literature was awarded to the Italian poet Salvatore Quasimodo (1901–1968) "for his lyrical poetry, which with classical fire expresses the tragic experience of life in our own times" He is the fourth Italian recipient of the said prize.

== Laureate ==
Salvatore Quasimodo was an Italian poet, critic and translator. He published his first poetry in Nuovo giornale letterario ("New Literary Journal"), which he created in 1917. His first collection of poems, Acque e terre ("Waters and Lands"), appeared in 1930, and beginning in 1938, he devoted himself entirely to writing. The two schools of poetry that are typically used to categorize his work are hermetic and post-hermetic. World War II caused a shift in the poet's style. Hermetic poetry rejected the use of words as a means of verbal coercion and believed that words have a subjective meaning that is determined more by their sound than by their actual meaning. Along with Giuseppe Ungaretti and Eugenio Montale, he was one of the foremost Italian poets of the 20th century.

== Deliberations ==
=== Nominations ===
Salvatore Quasimodo was nominated for the Nobel prize in literature twice, in 1958 (by 3 different nominators), and in 1959.

In total, the Nobel committee received 83 nominations for 56 authors, including nominations for Saint-John Perse (awarded in 1960), Ivo Andrić (awarded in 1961), John Steinbeck (awarded in 1962), Jean-Paul Sartre (awarded in 1964), Karen Blixen, André Malraux, Romulo Gallegos, Carl Sandburg, Graham Greene, Aldous Huxley, John Cowper Powys, Alberto Moravia, Ignazio Silone, Ezra Pound, E. M. Forster, Ramón Menéndez Pidal, Martin Buber, William Somerset Maugham, Thornton Wilder and Tarjei Vesaas. Twenty of the nominees were new recommendations, including Ernest Claes, Osbert Sitwell, Sacheverell Sitwell, Martin Heidegger, Juana de Ibarbourou, Heimito von Doderer, María Raquel Adler, Miguel Torga, Arnold Zweig, Étienne Gilson, Louis Aragon, Anna Seghers, Frank Raymond Leavis, Max Frisch and Julien Gracq. Most nominations, seven, were submitted for the Polish author Maria Dabrowska. There were women nominated namely: Elizabeth Goudge, Maria Dabrowska, Juana de Ibarbourou, Karen Blixen, Anna Seghers, Edith Sitwell, Gertrud von le Fort and María Raquel Adler.

The authors Maxwell Anderson, Emil František Burian, Raymond Chandler, G. D. H. Cole, Laxmi Prasad Devkota, Laurence Housman, Hans Henny Jahnn, Edwin Muir, Luis Palés Matos, Benjamin Péret, Marta Rădulescu, Alfred Schütz, Galaktion Tabidze, José Vasconcelos, Boris Vian, Arthur Henry Ward (known as Sax Rohmer) and Percy F. Westerman died in 1959 without having been nominated for the prize.

Official list of nominees and their nominators for the prize
No.	Nominee	Country	Genre(s)	Nominator(s)
1	María Raquel Adler (c. 1900–1974)	Argentina	poetry, essays	Consejo del Escritor
2	Stefan Andres (1906–1970)	West Germany	novel, short story	Josef Quint (1898–1976)
3	Ivo Andrić (1892–1975)	Yugoslavia	novel, short story, poetry	Association of Writers of Yugoslavia; Georges Luciani (1903–1981)
4	Louis Aragon (1897–1982)	France	novel, short story, poetry, essays	Margaret Schlauch (1898–1986); Pierre Grappin (1915–1997)
5	Werner Bergengruen (1892–1964)	West Germany	novel, short story, poetry	Josef Quint (1898–1976)
6	Karen Blixen (1885–1962)	Denmark	novel, short story, memoir	Hjalmar Gullberg (1898–1961)
7	Martin Buber (1878–1965)	Austria; Israel	philosophy	Simon Halkin (1899–1987)
8	Ernest Claes (1885–1968)	Belgium	novel, short story, drama	W. F. Mainland (–)
9	Maria Dąbrowska (1889–1965)	Poland	novel, short story, essays, drama, literary criticism	Several professors; Rachmiel Brandwajn (1913–1990); Gunnar Gunnarsson (1889–1975); Jan Reychman (1910–1975); Mieczysław Brahmer (1899–1984); Kazimierz Feliks Kumaniecki (1905–1977); Stanisław Helsztyński (1891–1986)
10	Gonzague de Reynold (1880–1970)	Switzerland	history, essays, biography, memoir	Swiss Writers Association; Pierre-Henri Simon (1903–1972)
11	Edward Morgan Forster (1879–1970)	United Kingdom	novel, short story, drama, essays, biography, literary criticism	Pierre Legouis (1891–1975); Henri Peyre (1901–1988); Simeon Potter (1898–1976); Richard Middlewood Wilson (1908–1970); Kenneth Muir (1907–1996)
12	Max Frisch (1911–1991)	Switzerland	novel, drama	Saxon Academy of Sciences and Humanities
13	Christopher Fry (1907–2005)	United Kingdom	poetry, drama, screenplay	Werner Kohlschmidt (1904–1983)
14	Rómulo Gallegos (1884–1969)	Venezuela	novel, short story	José Manuel Núñez Ponte (1870–1965); Rafael Yepes Trujillo (1898–1972); Luis Yépez (?); Edgar Sanabria (1911–1989); Nicolás Eugenio Navarro (1867–1960); José Ramón Ayala Duarte (1878–1966); Simón Planas Suárez (1879–1967); Guillermo Trujillo Durán (1878–1967); Ramón Díaz Sánchez (1903–1968); Pedro Pablo Barnola (1908–1986); Rafael Angarita Arvelo (1898–1971); Luis Barrios Cruz (1898–1968); Jorge Schmidke (1890–1985); Arturo Uslar Pietri (1906–2001)
15	Étienne Gilson (1884–1978)	France	philosophy	Fritz Schalk (1902–1980)
16	Jean Giono (1895–1970)	France	novel, short story, essays, poetry, drama	Henrik Cornell (1890–1981)
17	Julien Gracq (1910–2007)	France	novel, poetry, drama, literary criticism	André Lebois (1915–1978)
18	Graham Greene (1904–1991)	United Kingdom	novel, short story, autobiography, essays	Kristian Smidt (1916–2013); Clifford Leech (1909–1977)
19	Elizabeth Goudge (1900–1984)	United Kingdom	novel, short story, biography, autobiography	Edmond Privat (1889–1962)
20	Martin Heidegger (1889–1976)	West Germany	philosophy, essays	Josef Quint (1898–1976)
21	Hans Egon Holthusen (1913–1997)	West Germany	poetry, literary criticism, essays	Helmut Viebrock (1912–1997)
22	Aldous Huxley (1894–1963)	United Kingdom	novel, short story, essays, poetry, screenplay, drama, philosophy	Geoffrey Bullough (1901–1982); B. A. Wright (–)
23	Juana de Ibarbourou (1892–1979)	Uruguay	poetry, essays	Several professors; American Writers Association
24	Rudolf Kassner (1873–1959)	Austria	philosophy, essays, translation	Eudo Mason (1901–1969); Herbert Huscher (1933–2010)
25	Miroslav Krleža (1893–1981)	Yugoslavia	poetry, drama, short story, novel, essays	Association of Writers of Yugoslavia
26	Frank Raymond Leavis (1895–1978)	United Kingdom	literary criticism, essays	Cecil Arthur Hackett (1908–2000)
27	André Malraux (1901–1976)	France	novel, essays, literary criticism	Georges Matoré (1908–1998); Armand Caraccio (1895–1969); Cuthbert Girdlestone (1895–1975); Knud Togeby (1918–1974); Claude Digeon (1920–2008); John McCormick (1918–2010)
28	William Somerset Maugham (1874–1965)	United Kingdom	novel, short story, drama, essays	Robert Niklaus (1910–2001)
29	Charles Mauron (1899–1966)	France	essays, literary criticism, translation	Charles Rostaing (1904–1999)
30	Ramón Menéndez Pidal (1869–1968)	Spain	philology, history	Hans Rheinfelder (1898–1971); Gunnar Tilander (1894–1973)
31	Alberto Moravia (1907–1990)	Italy	novel, literary criticism, essays, drama	Hjalmar Gullberg (1898–1961)
32	Seán O'Casey (1880–1964)	Ireland	drama, memoir	Geoffrey Tillotson (1905–1969)
33	Marcel Pagnol (1895–1974)	France	novel, memoir, drama, screenplay	Marcel Clavel (1894–1976)
34	Jan Parandowski (1895–1978)	Poland	essays, translation	Ananiasz Zajączkowski (1903–1970)
35	Saint-John Perse (1887–1975)	France	poetry	Marcel Ruff (1896–1993); Jean-Jacques Mayoux (1901–1987); Léon Cellier (1911–1976); Harry Martinson (1904–1978)
36	Ezra Pound (1885–1972)	United States	poetry, essays	Johannes Edfelt (1904–1997)
37	John Cowper Powys (1872–1963)	United Kingdom	philosophy, novel, literary criticism, poetry, essays, short story	G. Wilson Knight (1897–1985)
38	Vasco Pratolini (1913–1991)	Italy	novel, short story	Paul Renucci (1915–1976)
39	Salvatore Quasimodo (1901–1968)	Italy	poetry, translation	Carlo Bo (1911–2001)
40	Mario Roques (1875–1961)	Peru; France	history, philology, essays	Ida-Marie Frandon (1907–1997)
41	Sochi Raut Roy (1916–2004)	India	poetry, novel, short story	Radhakamal Mukerjee (1889–1968)
42	Carl Sandburg (1878–1967)	United States	poetry, essays, biography	Roger Asselineau (1915–2002)
43	Jean-Paul Sartre (1905–1980)	France	philosophy, novel, drama, essays, screenplay	Kristian Smidt (1916–2013); André-Marc Vial (1917–1987)
44	Jean Schlumberger (1877–1968)	France	poetry, essays	Pierre Legouis (1891–1973)
45	Anna Seghers (1900–1983)	East Germany	novel, short story	Erich Kühne (1917–2016)
46	Ignazio Silone (1900–1978)	Italy	novel, short story, essays, drama	Hjalmar Gullberg (1898–1961)
47	Edith Sitwell (1887–1964)	United Kingdom	poetry, essays, memoir	Alexander Gillies (1907–1982)
48	Osbert Sitwell (1892–1969)	United Kingdom	novel, short story, essays, autobiography	Alexander Gillies (1907–1982)
49	Sacheverell Sitwell (1897–1988)	United Kingdom	poetry, essays	Alexander Gillies (1907–1982)
50	John Steinbeck (1902–1968)	United States	novel, short story, screenplay	Eugène Vinaver (1899–1979)
51	Miguel Torga (1907–1995)	Portugal	poetry, short story, novel, drama, autobiography	Jean-Baptiste Aquarone (1903–1989)
52	Tarjei Vesaas (1897–1970)	Norway	poetry, novel	Harald Beyer (1891–1960); Johannes Andreasson Dale (1898–1975); Sigmund Skard (1903–1995)
53	Heimito von Doderer (1896–1966)	Austria	novel, short story, poetry, essays	Hans Neumann (1903–1990)
54	Gertrud von Le Fort (1876–1971)	West Germany	novel, short story, essays, poetry	Friedrich von der Leyen (1873–1966)
55	Thornton Wilder (1897–1975)	United States	drama, novel, short story	Josef Quint (1898–1976)
56	Arnold Zweig (1887–1968)	East Germany	novel, short story	Saxon Academy of Sciences and Humanities

== Prize decision ==
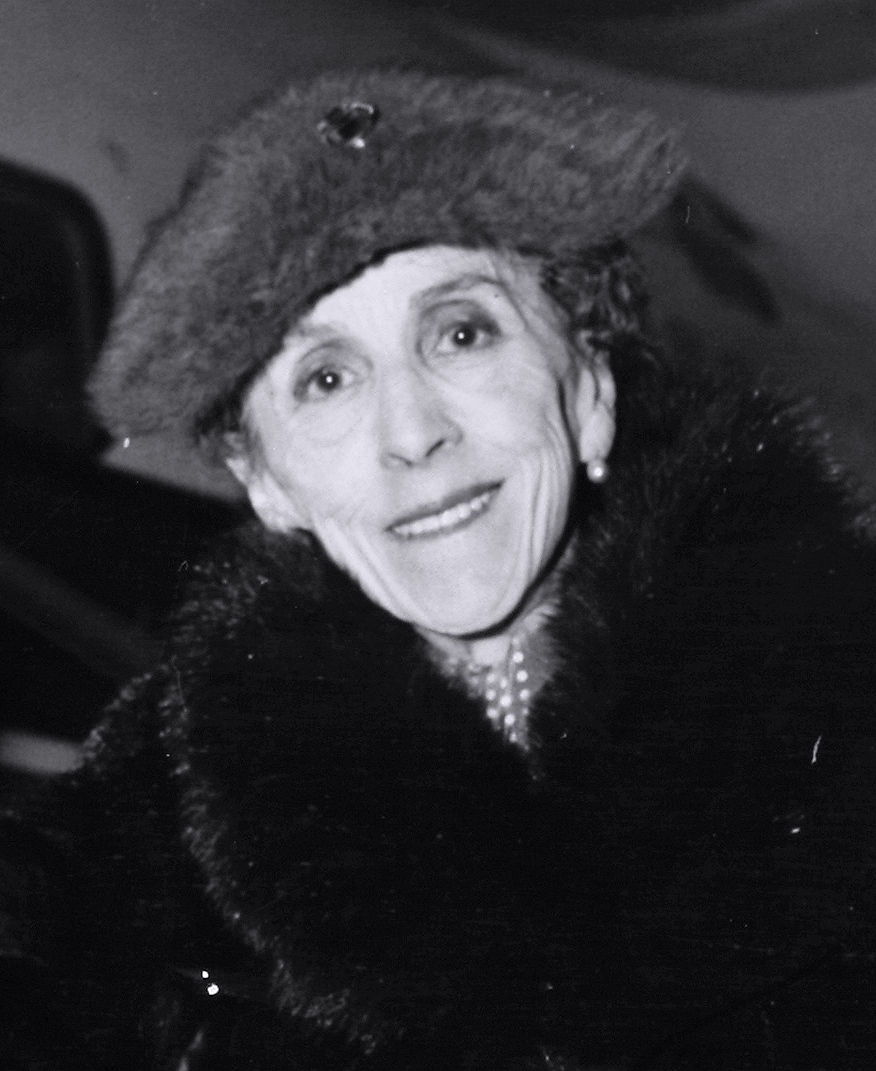
The Nobel committee proposed that the 1959 Nobel Prize in Literature should be awarded to the Danish author Karen Blixen.

The Nobel committee was almost unanimous to propose that the Danish author Karen Blixen should be awarded the 1959 Nobel Prize in Literature. Committee chairman Anders Österling advocated a prize for Blixen, citing her "undubitable masterpiece" Out of Africa, and her short stories in which "she has created her own genre," that "at the high points are shining with ingenious fantasy and spiritual human knowledge". Two other members of the Nobel committee also supported a prize to Blixen.

But the fourth committee member Eyvind Johnson (who himself fifteen years later would accept the 1974 Nobel Prize in Literature) opposed a prize to Blixen arguing that Scandinavians were overrepresentated among the Nobel laureates in literature. Johnson instead proposed a prize to a representative of the "rich, modern Italian literature", arguing that the Italian literature had been neglected and such a decision "would everywhere be perceived as a testification of the Academy's vigilance and be appreciated all over the literary world". Salvatore Quasimodo was Johnson's first proposal, followed by Ignazio Silone and Alberto Moravia.

Unconventionally, the members of the Swedish Academy did not follow the Nobel committees recommendation to award Blixen, but was convinced about Quasimodo's candidacy and surprisingly awarded him the prize.

== Reactions ==
The choice of Quasimodo was largely met with negative reactions. The Swedish newspaper Aftonbladet criticized the Swedish Academy for "rewarding mediocrity" and many Italian critics agreed. Commentators have argued that there were other Italian poets such as Giuseppe Ungaretti and Eugenio Montale (awarded in 1975) who would have been more worthy of the prize. Nonetheless, C.M. Bowra of the New York Times said upon the prize announcement that "The Swedish Academy has shown a wise judgment and a welcome courage in giving the Nobel Prize for Literature to the Italian poet, Salvatore Quasimodo."

Retrospectively, the decision to deny Karen Blixen the prize in favour of Quasimodo was called "reverse provincialism" by a Danish commentator when the Nobel records were opened after fifty years in 2010. The same year, Kjell Espmark of the Swedish Academy described the Academy's rejection of Blixen as a mistake, saying that Blixen would likely have been better accepted internationally than other Scandinavian Nobel laureates and that an opportunity to correct the underrepresention of female laureates was regrettably missed.

In 1985, American culture critic James Gardner noted: "Even the Italians seem to feel that the bestowal upon Quasimodo of the 1959 Nobel Prize for Literature was vastly in excess of his artistic attainments. For not only was it disputed that he possessed that Olympian stature implicit in the conferring of this last dignity upon a living author, it was also unclear why he should have been preferred before his two fellow Hermeticists Eugenio Montale and Giuseppe Ungaretti, or a dozen other Italian poets who were felt to be not only more melodious and more profound, but also much more easily understood. One solution to this mystery, which in its way is as peculiar and intractable as many of his poems, might be Quasimodo’s role in the Resistance, which would have cleared him of any taint of fascism, and then his sympathies with the Left, which in poets is always construed as a positive virtue."
