= Marco Lusini =

One of Lusini's later works, reflecting his theme of the female form.

Marco Lusini (8 September 1936 in Siena – 3 October 1989 in Florence) was an Italian artist who worked in painting, sculpture, photography, and poetry. Born in Siena, he attended art school before relocating to Florence in 1960. Here, he involved himself in the "Bazzechi" photographic studio before becoming well known as a painter. He actively contributed to the city's cultural life, thereby becoming a friend and collaborator to such writers and poets as Mario Luzi, Alessandro Parronchi, Elvio Natali, Piero Santi, Elio Filippo Accrocca, Enzo Carli, Alfonso Gatto, Giulio Guberti, Franco Solmi, Carlo Segala, and Claudio Spadoni. He achieved fame throughout Italy and internationally.

Italian poet Mario Luzi opined that the "intense figurations of extraneousness and undeception" of Lusini's earlier work allowed the viewer to "let us know him". Luzi contrasted this with some of Lusini's later work, which he thought carried with it "a new utmost feeling of expectation and perhaps even something more... the very acute sense of the imminence of a final event".

The art critic Elvio Natali noted that the "one unfailing subject" which recurred throughout Lusini's work was "The human image, whether it is a woman's image or a man's image, often asexual, as a symbol of a common, undifferentiated destiny." He nevertheless noted that Lusini's work went through several cycles, among them "Lovers", "Mysterious figures", "Homage to Brecht", "Object Woman", and "Oneiric Landscapes".

In 1978, Lusini exhibited his work in Miami, Florida. Following Lusini's death, Gerhard Gruitrooy devoted his paper on Giovanni Battista Naldini to Lusini's memory in volume seventeen of The J. Paul Getty Museum Journal.

== Sources ==
- Luzi, Mario (1982), Marco Lusini. Profile Critico di E Natali, Ravenna: Stear
