= Liliana Segre =

Italian Holocaust survivor and senator for life (born 1930)

Senator for life Liliana Segre OMRI
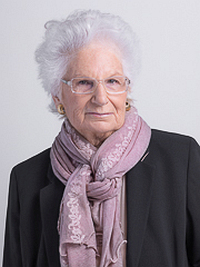
- Segre in 2018

Member of the Senate of the Republic
- Incumbent
- Life tenure 19 January 2018
- Appointed by: Sergio Mattarella

Personal details
- Born: 10 September 1930 (age 96) Milan, Kingdom of Italy
- Party: Independent
- Spouse: Alfredo Belli Paci (m. 1951; d. 2007)
- Children: 3
- Education: Sapienza University of Rome; University of Bergamo; University of Trieste; University of Verona; LUMSA University
- Known for: Holocaust survivor

Liliana Segre OMRI (Italian pronunciation: [liˈljaːna ˈsɛːɡre, - ˈseːɡre]; born 10 September 1930) is an Italian Holocaust survivor, named senator for life by President Sergio Mattarella in 2018 for outstanding patriotic merits in the social field.

Born in 1930 into a Milanese family of Jewish origins, in 1938 Segre was expelled from her primary school after the promulgation of the Italian Racial Laws. In 1943, she was arrested with her family and deported to the Auschwitz concentration camp. The only survivor among her relatives, with the end of the World War II in 1945, she returned to Milan. After decades of silence, in the 1990s she started to speak to the public, especially young students, about her experience.

== Biography ==
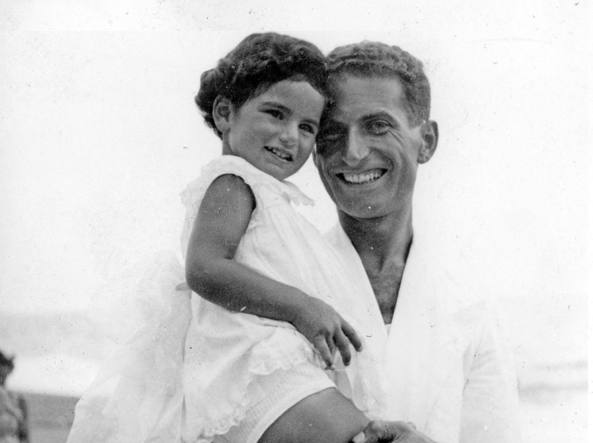
Segre and her father Alberto

Born in Milan into a family of Jewish origins, Segre lived with her father Alberto and her paternal grandparents, Giuseppe Segre and Olga Loevvy. Her mother, Lucia Foligno, died when Liliana was not yet one year old. Her family was secular, and the awareness of being Jewish came to Liliana only after the drama of the Italian Racial Laws of 1938, after which she was expelled from school.

After the intensification of the persecution of the Italian Jews, her father hid her at a friend's home, using false documents. On 10 December 1943, at the age of thirteen, together with her father, Segre tried to flee to Switzerland, but both were rejected by the Swiss authorities.

On 11 December 1943, she was arrested by fascists in the province of Varese at Selvetta di Viggiù. After six days in prison in Varese, she was transferred to Como and finally to Milan, where she was detained for 40 days. On 30 January 1944, Segre was deported from platform 21 of the Milan Central railway station to the Auschwitz concentration camp, where she arrived seven days later. She was immediately separated from her father Alberto, whom she never saw again and who would be killed on 27 April 1944 (see the memorial plaque below). On 18 May 1944 her paternal grandparents were arrested in Inverigo, in the Province of Como, and deported after a few weeks to Auschwitz, where they were also killed on their arrival on 30 June.

At the selection, Segre was tattooed with the serial number 75190. She was employed in forced labour in the Union ammunition factory, which belonged to Siemens, for about one year. During her imprisonment, she underwent three other selections. In January 1945, after the evacuation of the camp, she faced the death march towards Ravensbrück concentration camp in Germany. After some weeks spent there in terrible conditions, she was marched on to its satellite Malchow concentration camp where she was liberated by the Red Army on 1 May 1945. Out of the 776 Italian children aged 14 or younger who were deported to the Auschwitz concentration camp, only 35 survived.

After the Nazi Holocaust, Segre moved to the Marche region where she lived with her maternal grandparents, the only surviving members of her family. In 1948, she met Alfredo Belli Paci, a Catholic political prisoner who had also survived the Nazi concentration camps. The two married in 1951 and had three children.

== Testimony ==
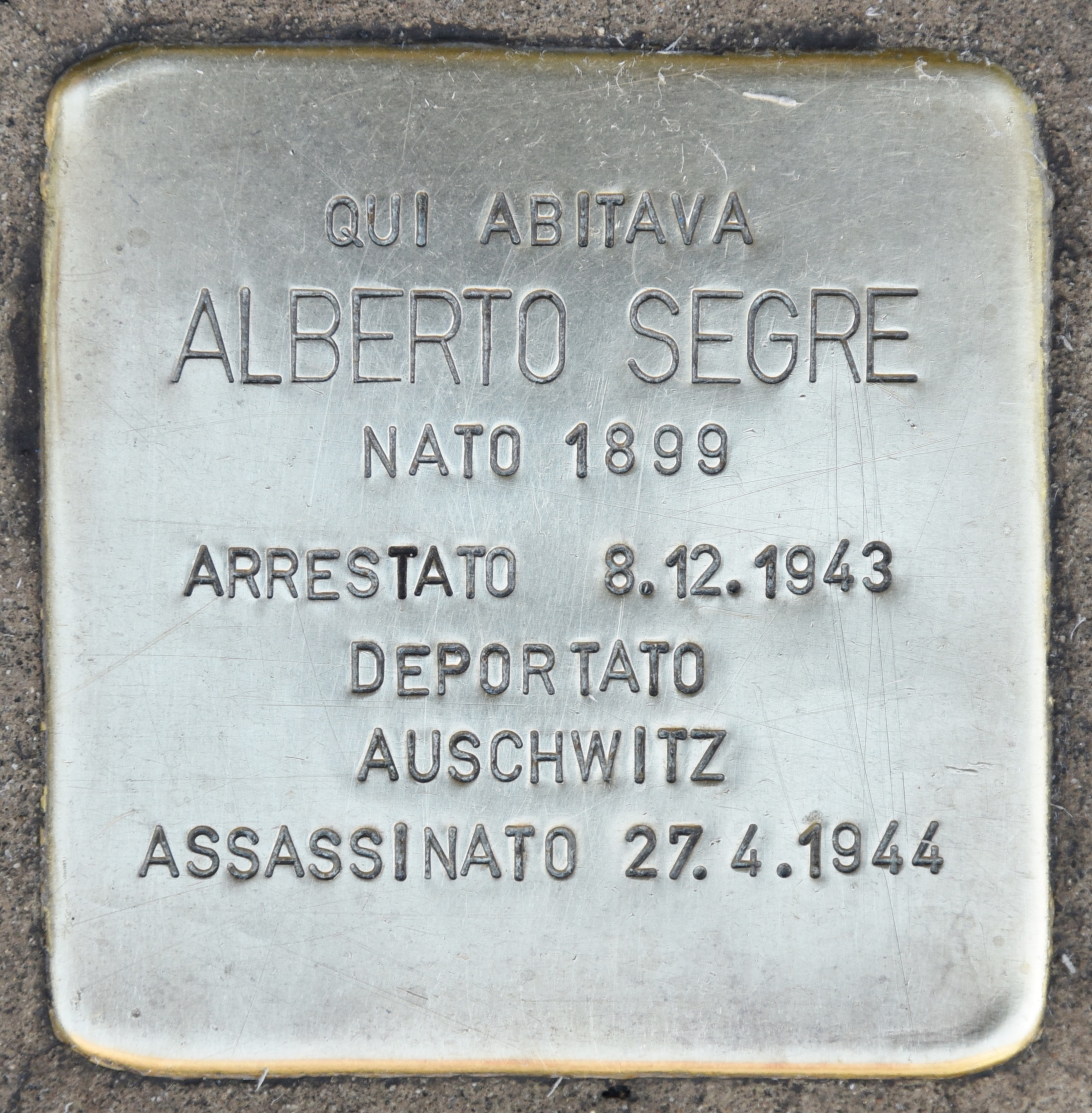
Stolperstein for her father Alberto

For a long time, Segre never wanted to speak publicly about her experience in concentration camps. Like many Holocaust children, returning home and to a normal life was far from easy. She also remembers that she did not find in those years any ear willing to listen to her. In 1996, she recalled:

Era molto difficile per i miei parenti convivere con un animale ferito come ero io: una ragazzina reduce dall'inferno, dalla quale si pretendeva docilità e rassegnazione. Imparai ben presto a tenere per me i miei ricordi tragici e la mia profonda tristezza. Nessuno mi capiva, ero io che dovevo adeguarmi ad un mondo che voleva dimenticare gli eventi dolorosi appena passati, che voleva ricominciare, avido di divertimenti e spensieratezza.

Translation:

"It was very difficult for my relatives to live with a wounded animal like I was: A little girl who came back from hell, from whom obedience and resignation was demanded. Soon I learned to keep my tragic memories and deep sadness to myself. Nobody understood me, I was the one who had to adapt myself to a world that wanted to forget the painful events that had just past, that wanted to start again, eager for fun and carefree."

It was only in the early 1990s that she decided to break her silence: since then she went to school assemblies and conferences to tell young people her story, also on behalf of the millions of others who shared it with her and who have never been able to communicate it. In 1997, she was among the witnesses of the documentary film Memoria, presented at the Berlin International Film Festival.

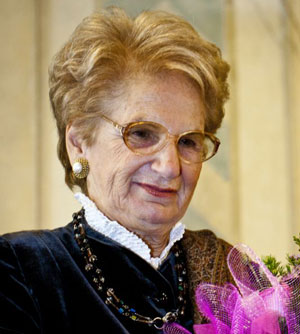
Segre in 2017

In 2004, Segre was interviewed, together with Goti Herskovits Bauer and Giuliana Fiorentino Tedeschi, by Daniela Padoan in Come una rana d'inverno. Conversazioni con tre donne sopravvissute ad Auschwitz (Like a frog in winter. Conversations with three women who survived from Auschwitz). In 2005 her story was retraced with more details in a book-interview by Emanuela Zuccalà, Sopravvissuta ad Auschwitz: Liliana Segre fra le ultime testimoni della Shoah (Survived in Auschwitz: Liliana Segre among the last witnesses of the Shoah. Also in 2005, she gave a video interview lasting more than five hours to Doris Felsen which is available in the Online Archive Forced Labor 1939–1945.

In 2009, Segre lent her voice Racconti di chi è sopravvissuto ('Tales of those who have survived'), a research project conducted by Marcello Pezzetti between 1995 and 2008 on behalf of the Center of Contemporary Jewish Documentation of Milan, which led to the collection of testimonies of almost all the Italian survivors from Nazi concentration camps who were still alive. In the same year, she participated in Moni Ovadia's film-documentary Binario 21 (Platform 21) directed by Felice Cappa, which was inspired by the poem Dos lid funem oysgehargetn yidishn folk ("The Song of the Murdered Jewish People") written by Polish poet Itzhak Katzenelson.

On 27 November 2008, the University of Trieste awarded Segre with an honorary degree in Law. On 15 December 2010, the University of Verona awarded her with an honorary degree in Pedagogy. On 26 October 2020, LUMSA University awarded her with an honorary degree in International relations.

== Senator for life ==
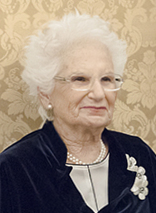
Senator Segre in 2018

On 19 January 2018, the 80th anniversary of the Italian Racial Laws, the President of the Italian Republic, Sergio Mattarella, on the basis of article 59 subsection 2 of the Italian Constitution, appointed Segre as senator for life for outstanding patriotic merits in the social field.

Segre is the fourth woman to hold such position, after Camilla Ravera, Rita Levi-Montalcini, and Elena Cattaneo. As the first legislative act, she proposed the establishment of a Parliamentary Control Commission on racism, antisemitism and incitement to hatred and violence, supported by Senator for life colleagues Renzo Piano and Elena Cattaneo. On 30 October 2019, the Senate of the Republic, with 151 votes in favor, approved the motion, which established the commission.

On 7 November 2019, due to numerous threats received on social media, she was assigned a bodyguard by the Prefect of Milan, Renato Saccone.

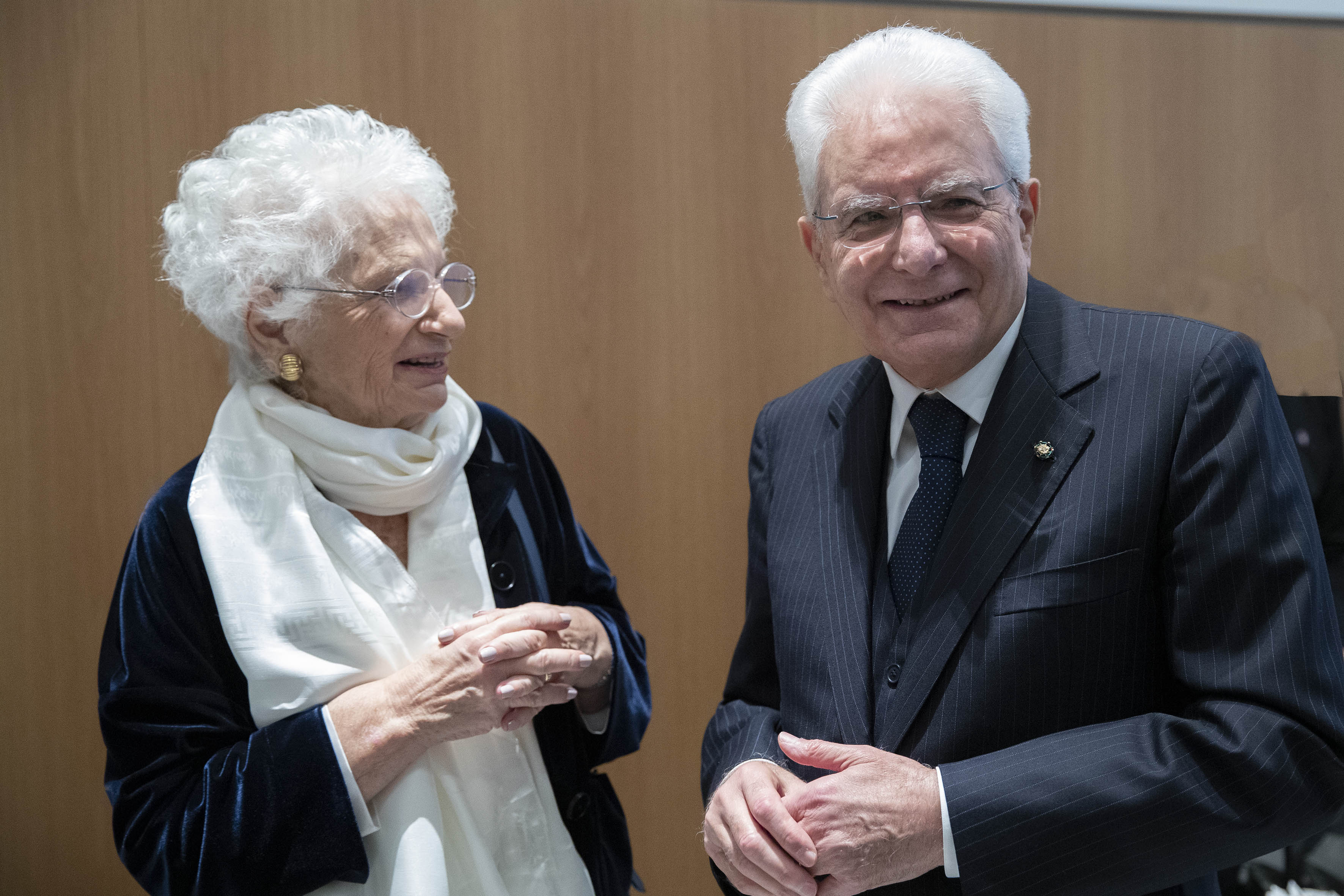
Senator Segre with President Mattarella in 2019

On 29 January 2020, invited by David Sassoli for the International Holocaust Remembrance Day and the 75th anniversary of the liberation of Auschwitz, she spoke before the European Parliament, where she received an ovation by the full assembly.

On 18 February 2020, during the Sapienza University of Rome academic year inauguration, also attended by President Mattarella, she was awarded a PhD honoris causa in European history, which she dedicated to her father Alberto, "killed for the guilt of being born (Jewish)".

On 9 October 2020, after 30 years of public witnesses about her life, she gave her last public speech in Rondine (Arezzo, Tuscany), where she invited the young not to blame others for their own failures and weakness, because they are very strong. The event was streamed and followed by thousands of students all across Italy.

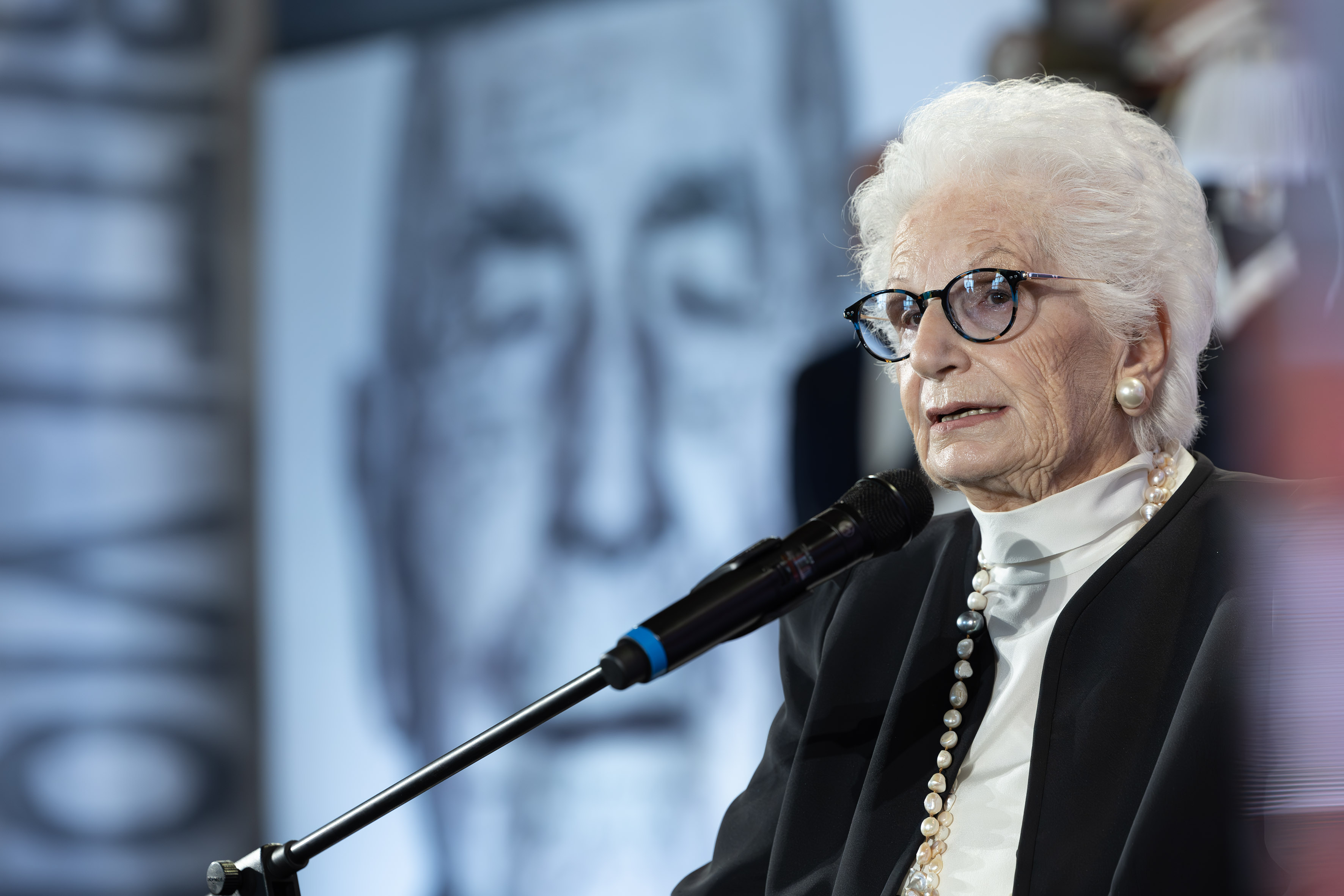
Segre speaking on 2025 Remembrance Day

On 2 February 2021, the University of Pisa awarded Segre with an honorary degree in peace and conflict studies.

Heading into the 2022 Italian general election, Segre told Pagine Ebraiche that Giorgia Meloni, leader of Brothers of Italy (FdI), should remove the tricolour flame, which is considered to be a neo-fascist symbol, from the party's logo. She was supported by the Democratic Party. FdI's co-founder Ignazio La Russa rejected this view, and Meloni ignored the request, keeping the tricolour flame in the party's election logo. On 13 October 2022, she presided the Senate's section during which she proclaimed La Russa as new President of the Senate.

== Israel and antisemitism ==
Segre has criticized Israel's actions against the Palestinian population, condemning both "fanatical ministers" and settlers, yet she has also opposed the use of the term "genocide", regarding it as something that "is not analytical, but is highly vindictive. It is a way for Europe to shake off its historical responsibility by inventing a sort of senseless contrappasso, shifting the blame onto the victims of Nazism by portraying today's Israel as a new form of Nazism." Segre supports the two-state solution.

Segre also supports the "antisemitism bill" proposed by the Meloni government, which introduces the IHRA definition of antisemitism, believing that it presents no issues regarding the right to criticize the State of Israel, contrary to the claims of others, and that it should be passed unanimously.

== See also ==
- Children in the Holocaust
- List of Holocaust survivors
