= Giuseppe Ungaretti =

Italian poet and academic (1888–1970)

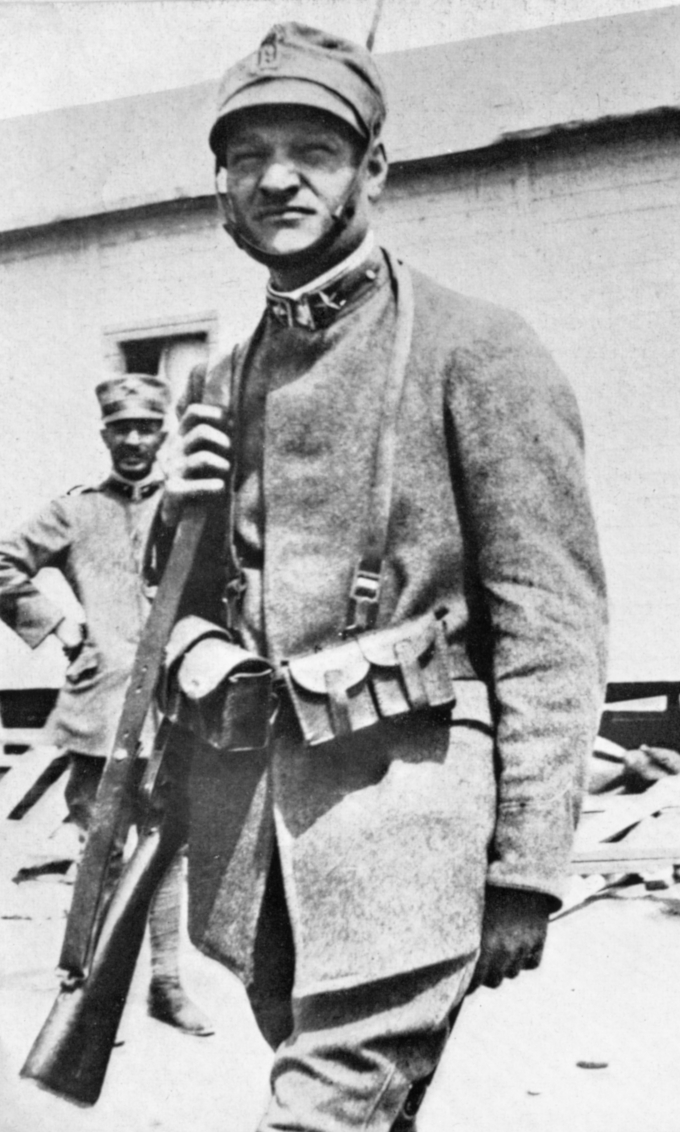
- Ungaretti in Italian infantry uniform during World War I
- Born: 8 February 1888; Alexandria, Khedivate of Egypt
- Died: 2 June 1970 (aged 82); Milan, Italy
- Occupations: Poet; journalist; essayist; academic; civil servant
- Writing career
- Period: 1912–1970
- Genres: lyric poetry, free verse
- Subject: literary criticism
- Movements: Symbolism; Futurism; Dada; Hermeticism

Signature
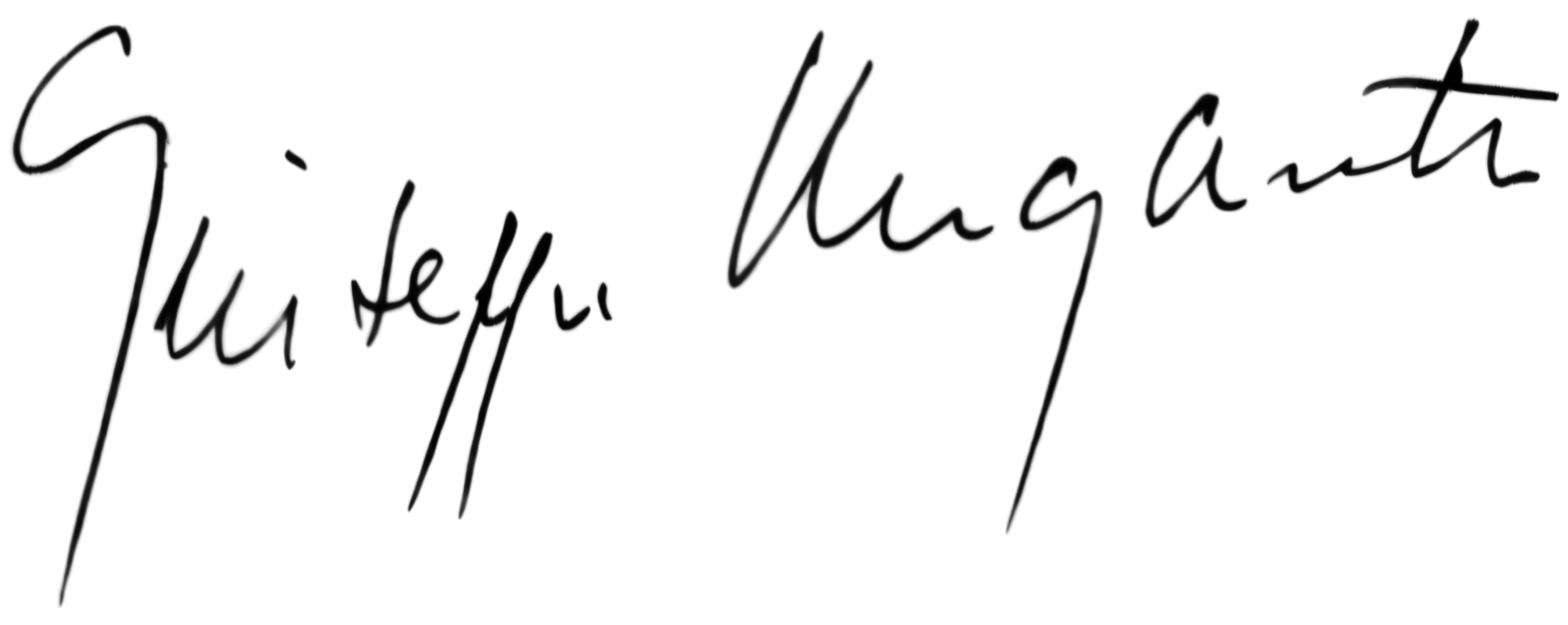

Giuseppe Ungaretti (Italian: [dʒuˈzɛppe uŋɡaˈretti]; 8 February 1888 – 2 June 1970) was an Italian modernist poet, journalist, essayist, critic, academic, and recipient of the inaugural 1970 Neustadt International Prize for Literature. A leading representative of the experimental trend known as Ermetismo ("Hermeticism"), he was one of the most prominent contributors to 20th-century Italian literature. Influenced by symbolism, he was briefly aligned with futurism. Like many futurists, he took an irredentist position during World War I. Ungaretti debuted as a poet while fighting in the trenches, publishing one of his best-known pieces, L'allegria ("The Joy").

During the interwar period, Ungaretti worked as a journalist with Benito Mussolini (whom he met during his socialist accession), as well as a foreign-based correspondent for Il Popolo d'Italia and Gazzetta del Popolo. While briefly associated with the Dadaists, he developed Hermeticism as a personal take on poetry. After spending several years in Brazil, he returned home during World War II, and was assigned a teaching post at the University of Rome, where he spent the final decades of his life and career.

== Biography ==
=== Early life ===
Ungaretti was born in Alexandria, Egypt into a family from the Tuscan city of Lucca. Ungaretti's father worked on digging the Suez Canal, where he suffered a fatal accident in 1890. His widowed mother, who ran a bakery on the edge of the Sahara, educated her child on the basis of Roman Catholic tenets.

Giuseppe Ungaretti's formal education began in French, at Alexandria's Swiss School. It was there that he became acquainted with Parnassianism and Symbolist poetry, in particular with Gabriele d'Annunzio, Charles Baudelaire, Jules Laforgue, Stéphane Mallarmé and Arthur Rimbaud. He also became familiar with works of the Classicists Giacomo Leopardi and Giosuè Carducci, as well as with the writings of maverick author Giovanni Pascoli. This period marked his debut as a journalist and literary critic, with pieces published Risorgete, a journal edited by anarchist writer Enrico Pea. At the time, he was in correspondence with Giuseppe Prezzolini, editor of the influential magazine La Voce. A regular visitor of Pea's Baracca Rossa ("Red House"), Ungaretti was himself a sympathizer of anarchist-socialist circles. He abandoned Christianity and became an atheist. It was not until 1928 that he returned to the Catholic faith.

In 1912, the 24-year-old Giuseppe Ungaretti moved to Paris, France. On his way there, he stopped in Rome, Florence and Milan, meeting face to face with Prezzolini. Ungaretti attended lectures at the Collège de France and the University of Paris, and had among his teachers was philosopher Henri Bergson, whom he reportedly admired. The young writer also met and befriended French literary figure Guillaume Apollinaire, a promoter of Cubism and a forerunner of Surrealism. Apollinaire's work came to be a noted influence on his own. He was also in contact with the Italian expatriates, including leading representatives of Futurism such as Carlo Carrà, Umberto Boccioni, Aldo Palazzeschi, Giovanni Papini and Ardengo Soffici, as well as with the independent visual artist Amedeo Modigliani.

=== World War I and debut ===
Upon the outbreak of World War I in 1914, Ungaretti, like his Futurist friends, supported an irredentist position, and called for his country's intervention on the side of the Entente Powers. Enrolled in the infantry a year later, he saw action on the Northern Italian theater, serving in the trenches. In contrast to his early enthusiasm, he became appalled by the realities of war. The conflict also made Ungaretti discover his talent as a poet, and, in 1917, he published the volume of free verse Il porto sepolto ("The Buried Port"), largely written on the Kras front. Although depicting the hardships of war life, his celebrated L'Allegria was not unenthusiastic about its purpose (even if in the poem "Fratelli", and in others, he describes the absurdity of the war and the brotherhood between all the men); this made Ungaretti's stance contrast with that of Lost Generation writers, who questioned their countries' intents, and similar to that of Italian intellectuals such as Soffici, Filippo Tommaso Marinetti, Piero Jahier and Curzio Malaparte.

By the time the 1918 armistice was signed, Ungaretti was again in Paris, working as a correspondent for Benito Mussolini's paper Il Popolo d'Italia. He published a volume of French-language poetry, titled La guerre ("The War", 1919). In 1920, Giuseppe Ungaretti married the Frenchwoman Jeanne Dupoix, with whom he had a daughter, Ninon (born 1925), and a son, Antonietto (born 1930).

During that period in Paris, Ungaretti came to affiliate with the anti-establishment and anti-art current known as Dadaism. He was present in the Paris-based Dadaist circle led by Romanian poet Tristan Tzara, being, alongside Alberto Savinio, Julius Evola, Gino Cantarelli, Aldo Fiozzi and Enrico Prampolini, one of the figures who established a transition from Italian Futurism to Dada. In May 1921, he was present at the Dadaist mock trial of reactionary author Maurice Barrès, during which the Dadaist movement began to separate itself into two competing parts, headed respectively by Tzara and André Breton. He was also affiliated with the literary circle formed around the journal La Ronda.

=== Hermeticism and fascism ===
The year after his marriage, Ungaretti returned to Italy, settling in Rome as a Foreign Ministry employee. By then, Mussolini had organized the March on Rome, which confirmed his seizure of power. Ungaretti joined in the National Fascist Party, signing the pro-fascist Manifesto of the Italian Writers in 1925. In his essays of 1926–1929, republished in 1996, he repeatedly called on the Duce to direct cultural development in Italy and reorganize the Italian Academy on fascist lines. He argued: "The first task of the Academy will be to reestablish a certain connection between men of letters, between writers, teachers, publicists. This people hungers for poetry. If it had not been for the miracle of Blackshirts, we would never have leaped this far." In his private letters to a French critic, Ungaretti also claimed that fascist rule did not imply censorship. Mussolini, who did not give a favorable answer to Ungaretti's appeal, prefaced the 1923 edition of Il porto sepolto, thus politicizing its message.

In 1925, Ungaretti experienced a religious crisis, which, three years later, made him return to the Roman Catholic Church. Meanwhile, he contributed to a number of journals and published a series of poetry volumes, before becoming a foreign correspondent for Gazzetta del Popolo in 1931, and traveling not only to Egypt, Corsica and the Netherlands, but also to various regions of Italy.

It was during this period that Ungaretti introduced Ermetismo, baptized with the Italian-language word for "Hermeticism". The new trend, inspired by both Symbolism and Futurism, had its origins in both Il porto sepolto, where Ungaretti had eliminated structure, syntax and punctuation, and the earlier contributions of Arturo Onofri. The style was indebted to the influence of Symbolists from Edgar Allan Poe to Baudelaire, Rimbaud, Mallarmé and Paul Valéry. Alongside Ungaretti, its main representatives were Eugenio Montale and Salvatore Quasimodo.

Despite the critical acclaim he enjoyed, the poet faced financial difficulties. In 1936, he moved to the Brazilian city of São Paulo, and became a Professor of Italian at São Paulo University. It was there that, in 1939, his son Antonietto died as a result of a badly performed appendectomy.

=== World War II and after ===
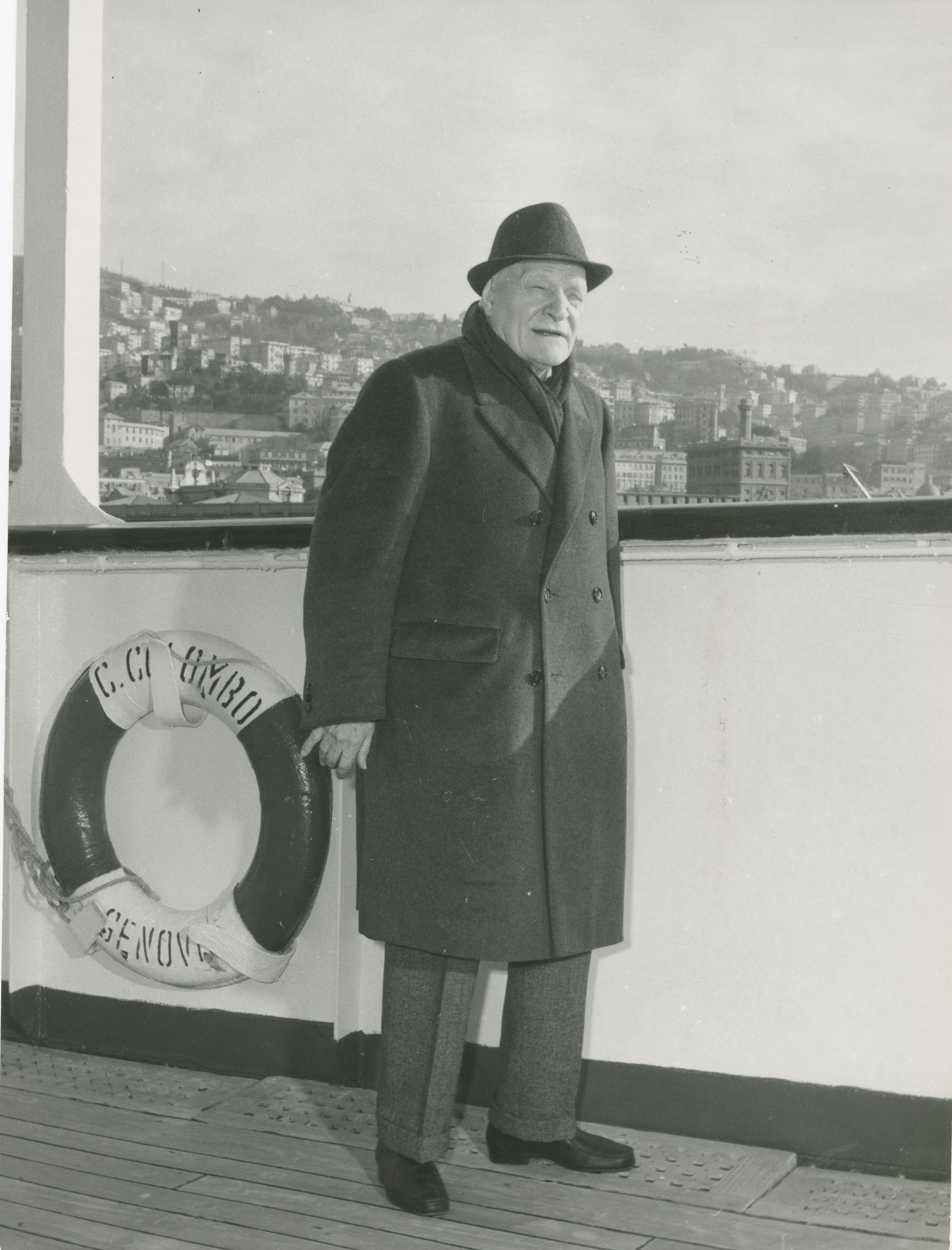
Portrait of the poet aboard the ship Cristoforo Colombo in 1964

In 1942, three years after the start of World War II, Ungaretti returned to Axis-allied Italy, where he was received with honors by the officials. The same year, he was made a Professor of Modern Literature at the University of Rome. He continued to write poetry, and published a series of essays. By then, Hermeticism had come to an end, and Ungaretti, like Montale and Quasimodo, had adopted a more formal style in his poetry. At Rome, Ungaretti mentored the poet Elio Filippo Accrocca, whose work was greatly influenced by Ungaretti's.

At the close of the war, following Mussolini's downfall, Ungaretti was expelled from the faculty owing to his fascist connections, but reinstated when his colleagues voted in favor of his return. Affected by his wife's 1958 death, Giuseppe Ungaretti sought comfort in traveling throughout Italy and abroad. He visited Japan, the Soviet Union, Israel and the United States.

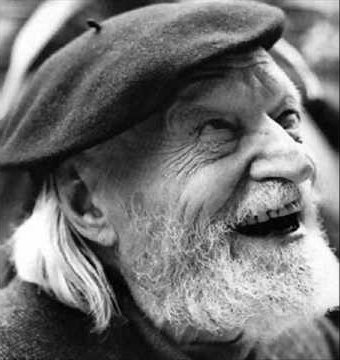
Ungaretti with his famous baschetto (beret)

In 1964, he gave a series of lectures at Columbia University in New York City, and, in 1970, was invited by the University of Oklahoma to receive its Books Abroad Prize. During this last trip, Ungaretti fell ill with bronchopneumonia, and, although he received treatment in New York City, died while under medical supervision in Milan. He was buried in Campo Verano (Rome).

== Poetry ==
L'Allegria, previously called L'Allegria di Naufragi, is a decisive moment of the recent history of Italian literature: Ungaretti revises with novel ideas the poetic style of the poètes maudits (especially the broken verses without punctation marks of Guillaume Apollinaire's Calligrammes and the equality between verse and a single word), connecting it with his experience of death and pain as a soldier at war. The hope of brotherhood between all the people is expressed strongly, together with the desire of searching for a renovated "harmony" with the universe, impressive in the famous verses of Mattina:

M'illumino
d'immenso

— Santa Maria la Longa, 26 January 1917
Translation:

I illuminate (myself)
with immensity

— Flora, August 2010

A famous poem regarding the First World War is Soldati (soldiers), which emblematically and emotionally describes their feelings of uncertainty and fear:

Si sta come
d'autunno
sugli alberi
le foglie

— Bois de Courton, July 1918
Translation:

It's like being
in the autumn
on the trees
the leaves

— M. Tanzy, November, 2015

In the successive works he studied the importance of the poetic word (marked by Hermeticism and symbolism), as the only way to save the humanity from the universal horror, and was searching for a new way to recuperate the roots of the Italian classical poetry. His last verses are on the poem l'Impietrito e il Velluto, about the memory of the bright universe eyed Dunja, an old woman that was house guest of his mother in the time of his childhood. Here is the end:

Il velluto dello sguardo di Dunja
Fulmineo torna presente pietà

— L'Impietrito e il Velluto, 1970
Translation:

The velvet in the bright gaze of Dunja
Rapid returns as present mercy

== Legacy ==
Although Ungaretti parted company with Ermetismo ("Hermeticism"), his early experiments were continued for a while by poets such as Alfonso Gatto, Mario Luzi and Leonardo Sinisgalli. His collected works were published as Vita di un uomo ("The Life of a Man") at the time of his death.

Two of Ungaretti's poems ("Soldiers – War – Another War" and "Vanity") were made into song by American composer Harry Partch (Eleven Intrusions, 1949–50); and eleven poems were set by the French-Romanian composer Horațiu Rădulescu in his cycle End of Kronos (1999). Fragments of his poetry are set by composer Michael Mantler in Cerco un Paese Innocente, a work recorded in 1994.

Austrian-Hungarian composer Iván Eröd used his poems in four of his works: "Tutto ho perduto" Op. 12 (1965), "Canti di Ungaretti" Op. 55 (1988), "Vox lucis" Op. 56 (1988–89) and in his last work "Canti di un Ottantenne" Op. 95 (2019), completed only several days before his death in June 2019.

== Published volumes ==
- Il porto sepolto ("The Buried Port", 1916 and 1923)
- La guerra ("The War", 1919 and 1947)
- Allegria di naufragi ("The Joy of Shipwrecks", 1919)
- L'allegria ("The Joy", 1931)
- Sentimento del tempo ("The Feeling of Time", 1933)
- Traduzioni ("Translations", 1936)
- Poesie disperse ("Scattered Poems", 1945)
- Il dolore ("The Pain", 1947)
- La terra promessa ("The Promised Land", 1950)
- Un grido e paesaggi ("A Shout and Landscapes", 1952)
- Il taccuino del vecchio ("The Old Man's Notebook", 1960)
- Vita di un uomo ("The Life of a Man", 1969)
