= Cantarelli =

Cantarelli is an Italian surname. Notable people with the surname include:

- Dario Cantarelli (born 1945), Italian actor
- Gino Cantarelli (1899–1950), Italian Dadaist poet and painter
