= Alessandro Parronchi =

Parronchi as a young man

Allessandro Parronchi (Florence, 26 December 1914 – Florence, 6 January 2007) was an Italian poet, art historian, and literary critic. He won the 1999 Mondello Prize for literature.

Although much of his work has never been translated into English, in 1969 Grosset & Dunlap published a translation of his work on the sculpture of Michelangelo. A translation and critical study of his publications has been performed by Angela Joan Bedford Mackie.

== Biography ==
Parronchi was born to a middle-class Florentine family, with his father and grandfather being respected local figures. Interested in Classical literature from an early age, he began to think about the meaning of youth, as well as love and death, following the death of his father; these are themes that pervade his poetry.

In 1938 he graduated with a degree in art history, and begun working for Florentine magazines and newspapers. In this cultural atmosphere he associated with such poets and artists as Umberto Bellintani, Marco Lusini, Bilenchi Romano, Giorgio Caproni, Charles Betocchi, Alfonso Gatto, Fallacara, Mario Luzi, Piero Bigongiari, and Ottone Rosai. In 1941 he published his first book of poems, I giorni sensibili (Sensitive Dats), which he followed with I visi (Faces) in 1943 and Un'attesa in 1949. He subsequently gained employment as a university professor of art history, focusing in the art of the Renaissance.

On January 6, 2007, he died at his home of the Via Luigi Settembrini 21 in Florence, where he lived with his wife and daughter Nara.

== Bibliography ==
=== Poetry ===
- I giorni sensibili, Florence, 1941;
- I visi, Florence, 1943;
- Un'attesa, Modena, 1949;
- L'incertezza amorosa, Milan, 1952;
- Per strade di bosco e città, Florence, 1954;
- Coraggio di vivere, Milan, 1956;
- La noia della natura, Galatina, 1958;
- Coraggio di vivere, Milan, 1961;
- L'apparenza non inganna, Milano, 1966;
- Pietà dell'atmosfera, Milan, 1970;
- Replay, Milan, 1980;
- Climax, Milan, 1990;
- Per strade di bosco e di città, Florence, 1994;
- Poesie, Florence, 2000.

=== Non-fiction studies ===
- Studi su la dolce prospettiva, Milan, 1964;
- La nascita dell'Infinito (studi leopardiani); Montebelluna, 1989.
