= Elio Filippo Accrocca =

Italian poet, author, and translator (1923–1996)

Accrocca in later life

Elio Filippo Accrocca (17 April 1923 – 11 March 1996) was an Italian poet, author, and translator.

Having been born in Cori, Lazio, Accrocca studied at the University of Rome under the modernist poet Giuseppe Ungaretti, who remained a core influence on his poetry. From the mid-1950s, Accrocca began experimenting in new directions. He was an associate of many other figures in the Italian cultural scene, among them both literary figures like Alessandro Parronchi and artists like Marco Lusini.

In 1959, Accrocca and fellow poets Giorgio Caproni, Antonio Seccareccia, and Ugo Reale began the Frascati National Poetry Prize, an annual poetry competition for previously unpublished works. The annual prize began as a cask of wine; in 1974, it was changed to a cash prize of 1,000,000 Italian lira.

From 1977 he taught arts at the Accademia di belle arti di Foggia where he also worked as its director. Accrocca died in Rome, aged 72.
