= Antonio Seccareccia =

Italian poet

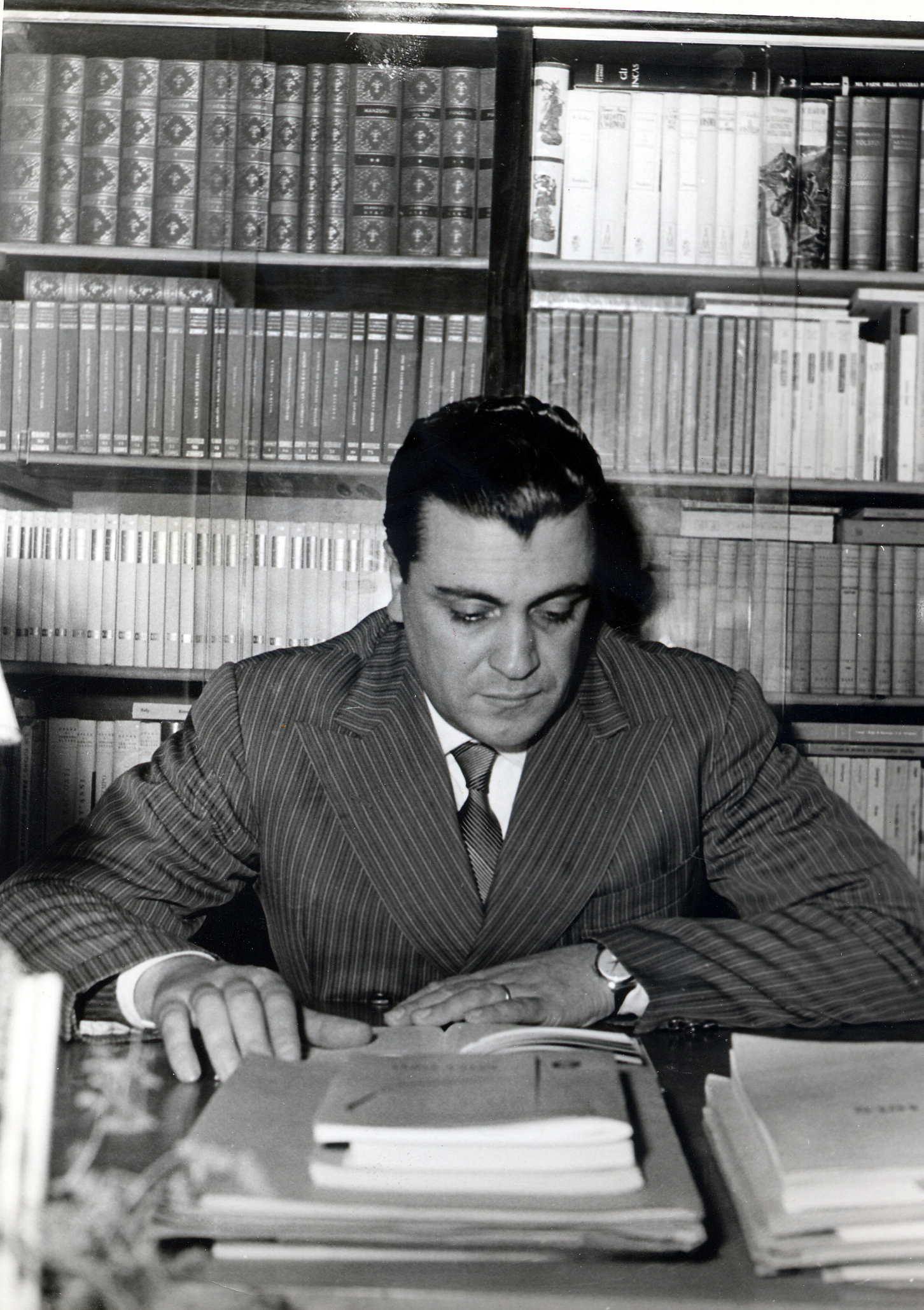
- Antonio Seccareccia
- Born: 1920; Galluccio, Campania, Italy
- Died: 1997; Frascati, Lazio, Italy
- Occupations: author; poet; policeman
- Years active: 1959-1997

Antonio Seccareccia (1920–1997) was an Italian poet.

== Early life ==
Seccareccia was born in Galluccio. He began working as a farmer and later he started his career as member of the Carabinieri, rising to the rank of sergeant, for which he was known as "the Marshal". In 1966, he left the Carabinieri and opened the first library in Frascati.

== Career ==
Seccareccia's first publication, Viaggio nel Sud (1959), was a collection of poems by Giorgio Caproni, with whom Seccareccia had a close relationship. For Viaggio nel Sud, he won the 1959 Giacomo De Benedetti Lerici Prize. Seccareccia also wrote Le isolane (1960), another collection of poetry, published by Lerici. Since his death, some of his material including poems, short stories, and a novel have been published posthumously. These include La memoria ferita (1997) and Partenza da un mattino freddo (2007). His works vary in genre between hermeticism and neorealism.

In 1959, Seccareccia and fellow poets Giorgio Caproni, Elio Filippo Accrocca, and Ugo Reale began the Frascati National Poetry Prize, an annual poetry competition for previously unpublished works. The annual prize began as a cask of wine; in 1974, it was changed to a cash prize of 1,000,000 Italian lira. He coordinated the award until his death in 1997.

== Death and legacy ==
Seccareccia died at the Frascati town castle in 1997.

Today, the Frascati Poetry Association awards its National Poetry Antonio Seccareccia to an Italian poet. The Association awards an annual €5,000 prize in Seccareccia's honor.

There is also a street in Frascati and a primary school in Galluccio named in his honor.
