= Hermeticism (poetry) =

Literary movement in poetry

Hermeticism in poetry, or hermetic poetry, is a form of obscure and difficult poetry, as of the Symbolist school, wherein the language and imagery are subjective, and where the suggestive power of the sound of words is as important as their meaning. The name alludes to the mythical Hermes Trismegistus.

Hermeticism was influential in the Renaissance, after the translation into Latin of a compilation of Greek Hermetic treatises called the Corpus Hermeticum by Marsilio Ficino (1433–1499). Within the Novecento Italiano, Hermetic poetry became an Italian literary movement in the 1920s and 1930s, developing in the interwar period. Major features of this movement were reduction to essentials, abolishment of punctuation, and brief, synthetic compositions, at times resulting in short works of only two or three verses.

== Terminology ==
The term ermetismo was coined in Italian by literary critic Francesco Flora (although with a very generic and superficial connotation) in 1936 and recalls a mystic conception of the poetic word because it makes reference to the legendary figure of Hermes Trismegistus (Thrice-Great Hermes) going back to hellenistic times, with writings such as Asclepius and the Corpus Hermeticum attributed to him. During the same year (1936), Italian poet Carlo Bo published an essay on the literary magazine Il Frontespizio, by the title "Letteratura come vita (Literature as a way of life)", containing the theoretical-methodological fundamentals of hermetic poetry.

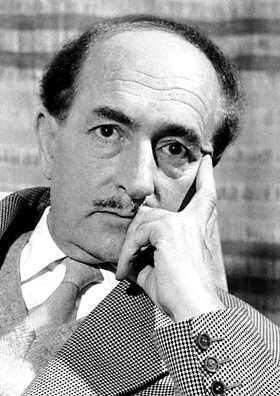
Hermetic poet and Nobel laureate Salvatore Quasimodo

On the literary plane, the term Hermeticism thus highlights a type of poetry which has a close (i.e., hermetic, hidden, sealed) character, complex in its construction and usually achieved by a sequence of analogies difficult to interpret.

At the movement's core—which was modelled after the great French decadentist poets Mallarmé, Rimbaud and Verlaine—was a group of Italian poets, called hermeticists, who followed the style of Giuseppe Ungaretti and Eugenio Montale.

== Themes and styles ==
Rejecting any direct social and political involvement, in order to detach themselves from the fascist culture, the hermetic group used a difficult and closed style in the analogic form, with a constant emotional introspection. Among these young intellectuals, some took strong anti-fascist stances, with Romano Bilenchi, Elio Vittorini, Alfonso Gatto and Vasco Pratolini being the main dissidents. "Tradition is Hermeticism's best ally".

Hermetic poetry opposes verbal manipulation and the ease of mass communication, which began taking place during Europe's dictatorial years, with the increasing brain-washing propaganda of the nazi-fascist regimes. Poetry therefore retreats into itself and assumes the task of returning sense to words, giving them back their semantic meaning, using them only when strictly necessary.

The hermetic poets pursue the ideal of a "pure poesy", an essential composition without educational aims. Their central theme is the desperate sense of loneliness modern man experiences, having lost the ancient values and myths of the romantic and positivistic society, no longer retaining any certitudes to refer to. Man lives in an incomprehensible world, ravaged by wars and enslaved by dictatorships, therefore the poet has a disheartened vision of life, without illusions, and repudiates the word as an act of communication in order to give it an evocative sense only. So, hermetic poetry is poetry of moods, of interior reflection expressed by a subdued and pensive tone, through a refined and evocative language, concealing direct intimations to experience in a play of allusions.

To describe the fleeting course of human life, Quasimodo would compose this famous hermetic poem "Ed è subito sera":

Ognuno sta solo sul cuor della terra
trafitto da un raggio di sole
ed è subito sera

The hermetic poets took their inspiration from Ungaretti's second book, Sentimento del Tempo (1933), with its complex analogies: one can thus consider Ungaretti as Hermeticism's first exponent.

In the field of hermetic literary critique, Carlo Bo was its main interpreter, with his discourse La letteratura come vita ("Literature as a way of life") dated 1938, where he wrote the actual hermetic manifesto by describing poetry as a moment of Absolute. Among the other critics and theoreticians, to be mentioned are Oreste Macrì, Giansiro Ferrata, Luciano Anceschi and Mario Luzi.

During the second half of the 1930s, an important hermetic group arose in Florence, around the Italian magazines Il Frontespizio and Solaria who were inspired by the works of Giuseppe Ungaretti, Salvatore Quasimodo and Arturo Onofri, and directly referred to European symbolism, also approaching more recent movements such as surrealism and existentialism.

== See also ==
- Symbolism
- Surrealism
- Existentialism
- Decadentism
- Corrente di Vita
- Novecento Italiano

== Bibliography ==
- Ebeling, Florian, The secret history of Hermes Trismegistus: Hermeticism from ancient to modern times [Translated from the German by David Lorton] (Cornell University Press: Ithaca, 2007), ISBN 978-0-8014-4546-0.
- Festugière, A.-J.,La révélation d'Hermès Trismégiste. 2e éd., 3 vol., Paris 1981.
- Fowden, Garth, 1986. The Egyptian Hermes: A Historical Approach to the Late Pagan Mind. Cambridge: Cambridge University Press (Princeton University Press, 1993): deals with Thoth (Hermes) from his most primitive known conception to his later evolution into Hermes Trismegistus, as well as the many books and scripts attributed to him.)
- Yates, Frances A., Giordano Bruno and the Hermetic Tradition. University of Chicago Press, 1964. ISBN 0-226-95007-7.
- Abel, Christopher R.; Hare, William O. (1997). Hermes Trismegistus: An Investigation of the Origin of the Hermetic Writings. Sequim: Holmes Publishing Group.
- Anonymous (2002). Meditations on the Tarot: A Journey into Christian Hermeticism. New York: Jeremy P. Tarcher/Penguin.
- Budge, E. A. Wallis (1895). The Egyptian Book of the Dead: (The Papyrus of Ani) Egyptian Text Transliteration and Translation. New York: Dover Publications.
- Churton, Tobias. The Golden Builders: Alchemists, Rosicrucians, and the First Freemasons. New York: Barnes and Noble, 2002.
- Copenhaver, B.P. Hermetica, Cambridge University Press, Cambridge, 1992.
- Garstin, E.J. Langford (2004). Theurgy or The Hermetic Practice. Berwick: Ibis Press. Published Posthumously
- Hoeller, Stephan A. On the Trail of the Winged God: Hermes and Hermeticism Throughout the Ages, Gnosis: A Journal of Western Inner Traditions (Vol. 40, Summer 1996). Also at "Hermes and Hermeticism". Gnosis.org. Archived from the original on 2009-11-26.
- Heiser, James D. (2011). Prisci Theologi and the Hermetic Reformation in the Fifteenth Century. Texas: Repristination Press.
- Powell, Robert A. (1991). Christian Hermetic Astrology: The Star of the Magi and the Life of Christ. Hudson: Anthroposohic Press.
- Regardie, Israel (1940). The Golden Dawn. St. Paul: Llewellyn Publications.
- Salaman, Clement and Van Oyen, Dorine and Wharton, William D. and Mahé, Jean-Pierre (2000). The Way of Hermes: New Translations of The Corpus Heremticum and The Definitions of Hermes Trismegistus to Asclepius. Rochester: Inner Traditions.
- Scully, Nicki (2003). Alchemical Healing: A Guide to Spiritual, Physical, and Transformational Medicine. Rochester: Bear & Company.
