= Alfonso Gatto =

Italian writer (1909–1976)

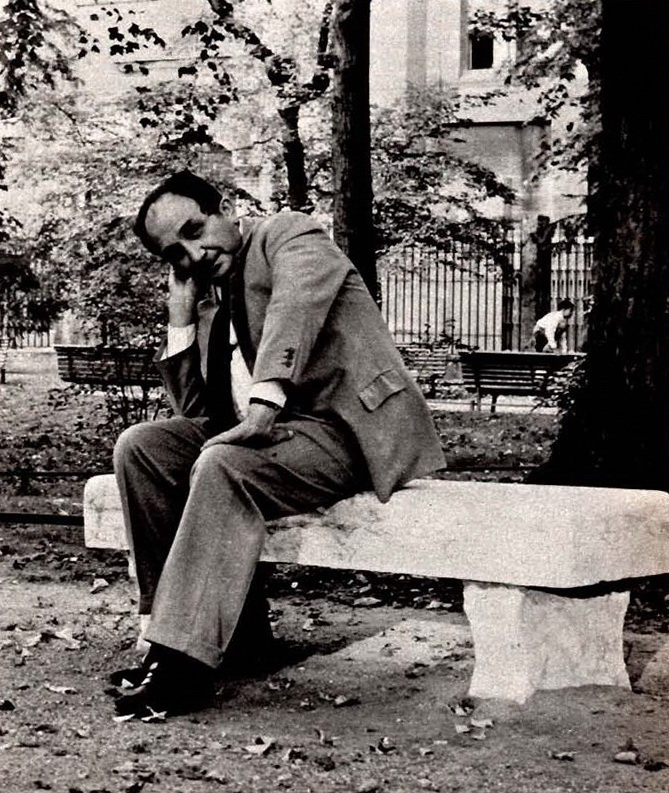
- Gatto in January 1975
- Born: 17 July 1909; Salerno, Italy
- Died: 8 March 1976 (aged 66); Orbetello, Italy
- Occupations: Poet; writer; art critic; painter; editor of literary journals
- Spouse: Jole
- Writing career
- Period: 1932–1974
- Genres: Poetry; theatre; fiction; essay
- Subjects: Love; emotional conflict; political engagement
- Notable awards: Bagutta Prize (1955), Viareggio Prize (1966)
- Literary movement: Hermeticism (poetry)

Alfonso Gatto (17 July 1909 – 8 March 1976) was an Italian poet and writer. Along with Giuseppe Ungaretti he is one of the foremost Italian poets of the 20th century and a major exponent of hermetic poetry.

== Biography ==
Gatto studied at the Salerno classic lycaeum, where he discovered his passion for poetry and literature. In 1926 he attended the University of Naples Federico II, but he had to discontinue his studies due to financial problems. Like many Italian poets of his age, such as Eugenio Montale and Salvatore Quasimodo, he never graduated.

Gatto fell in love with Jole, the daughter of his mathematics teacher, and at the age of 21, he eloped with her to Milan. He worked many different jobs: bookshop assistant, college instructor, proofreader, journalist, and teacher. In 1936, due to his anti-fascist activism, he was arrested and jailed at the San Vittore prison in Milan.

During those years, Gatto had been a contributor to various innovative journals and magazines of the Italian literary culture. In 1938 he founded the magazine Campo di Marte together with writer Vasco Pratolini and commissioned by Italian publisher Vallecchi, but it only lasted a year. It had been created as a fortnightly magazine (first issued on 1 August 1938) and with the specific remit of educating the public in the artistic and literary production of all genres. The magazine was directly connected with the so-called Florentine Hermeticism. Founding the magazine was a significant experience for Gatto, who was able to enter the leading literary circles.

In 1941 Gatto was appointed professor of Italian literature for "high merits", at the Art School of Bologna, and a special correspondent for the newspaper L'Unità, thus being placed in a primary position for the promotion of literature of communist inspiration. Subsequently, Gatto abandoned the Italian Communist Party and became a dissident communist. Gatto died in a car accident on 8 March 1976 at Capalbio in the province of Grosseto. He is buried in the cemetery of Salerno and on his tomb (which has a boulder as its tombstone) is engraved his friend Montale's funeral farewell:

Ad Alfonso Gatto / per cui vita e poesie / furono un'unica testimonianza/ d'amore

== Poetics ==
Alfonso Gatto was one of the most important and active exponents of Hermeticism. Not much is known about Gatto's first years in Salerno, which surely must have had a determinant role in his cultural background, and little is known also of his first readings, his first literary meetings, and his friends. However, the publication of his first book of poems in 1932, entitled Isola ("Island"), was highly welcomed as a truly new lyrical voice. When Giuseppe Ungaretti published in the same year his Sentimento del tempo ("The Feeling of Time", 1933), he included Gatto in a relevant chapter, notwithstanding the latter's very recent arrival on the literary scene.

With Isola, Gatto commenced his poetical existence, which concluded with his tragic death forty-four years later. Isola represents a decisive text for the construction of a hermetic grammar which will be defined by the poet himself, as a quest for a "natural absoluteness". His language is rarefied and timeless, allusive, and typical of a poetics of "absence" and empty space, rich in melodic motives. These will be the main elements of all of Gatto's output: these elements, in fact so distant from traditional models, are found in all his poems until 1939 and will gradually pass from familiar themes and landscape visions from youth, to a new phase, before and after World War II, which opens with his Arie e motivi ("Arias and motifs") and culminates with Poesie d'amore ("Love poems").

=== The motif of love ===
Gatto's motif of love is sung in all possible manners and to all possible directions and, even if with classicist tones, never loses the phonic value of words, as they become their own moment of suggestion.

In the period between 1940 and 1941, the poet revised his previous poems – which would later be included in a collection published in 1941 under the title Poesie ("Poems") – and they did not undergo changes until 1961 when, by giving them a better chronological and inspirational order in a new volume, they achieved Gatto's greatest lyricism.

One of the most vivid images of modern Italian poetry can be found in his poem Oblio, where the poet expresses the joy of life he feels, and which becomes memory and celebration:

Tutto si calma di memoria e resta
il confine più dolce della terra,
una lontana cupola di festa

In these verses, one can detect a disappearance of strict analogy, part of Gatto's first books, and in his Amore della vita ("Love of Life") of 1944, he will succeed in conveying a rare vigour to a rhetorical moment dedicated to the Italian Resistance. As a matter of fact, Gatto adhered to the poetry of Italian resistance, moved by the Italians' civil and political spirit, and in his subsequent collection of poetry, Il capo sulla neve ("The head in the snow"), he will create forceful and emotional words for the "Martyrs of the Resistance", expressing them in poems of deep meditation and poignant immediacy.

Gatto's poetry covers the themes of nature and instinct, and his later work incorporated lyrical self-analysis and a sense of historical engagement. His later works include Rime di viaggio per la terra dipinta ("Rhymes for journeying in the painted land") and Desinenze ("Declensions"), the latter published posthumously.

== Major works ==
=== Poetry ===
- Isola ("Island"), Naples 1932
- Morto ai paesi ("Dead to the villages"), Modena 1937
- Poesie ("Poems"), Milan 1939, new edition Florence 1943
- L'allodola ("Skylark"), Milan 1943
- La spiaggia dei poveri ("The beach of poors"), Milan 1944
- Arie e motivi ("Arias and motifs"), Milan 1944
- La spiaggia dei poveri ("The beach of poors"), Milan 1944, new ed. Salerno 1996
- Il sigaro di fuoco. Poesie per bambini ("The cigar of fire. Poems for children"), Milan 1945
- Il capo sulla neve ("Head in the snow"), Milan 1947
- Nuove poesie 1941–49, Milan 1949
- La forza degli occhi ("Force in the eyes"), Milan 1954
- La madre e la morte ("Mother and death"), Galatina 1959
- Poesie 1929–41, Milan 1961
- Osteria flegrea, Milan 1962
- Il vaporetto. Poesie, fiabe, rime, ballate per i bambini di ogni età ("The Ferryboat. Poems, fairy tales, rhymes, ballads for children of all ages"), Milan 1963, new eds. Salerno 1994 & Milan 2001
- La storia delle vittime ("Story of the victims"), Milan 1966
- Rime di viaggio per la terra dipinta ("Rhymes for journeying in the painted land"), Milan 1969
- Poesie 1929–69, Milan 1972
- Poesie d'amore ("Love poems"), Milan 1973
- Lapide 1975 ed altre cose, Genoa 1976
- Desinenze ("Declensions"), Milan 1977
- Poesie ("Poems"), Milan 1998
- Tutte le poesie ("All poems"), Milan 2005

=== Prose ===
- La sposa bambina ("The child bride"), Florence 1944, new eds. Florence 1963 & Salerno 1994
- La coda di paglia ("Tail of straw"), Milan 1948, new ed. Salerno 1995
- Carlomagno nella grotta. Questioni meridionali ("Charlemagne in the grotto. Southern questions"), Milan 1962, new ed. Florence 1974 (as Napoli N.N.) & Salerno 1993
- Le ore piccole (note e noterelle) ("Small hours"), Salerno 1975
- Parole a un pubblico immaginario e altre prose ("Words to an imaginary public and other writings"), Pistoia 1996
- Il signor Mezzogiorno, Naples 1996
- Il pallone rosso di Golia. Prose disperse e rare e l'inedito "Bagaglio presso", Milan 1997
- L'aria e altre prose, Pistoia 2000
- Diario d'un poeta ("A poet's diary"), Naples 2001
- La pecora nera ("The black sheep"), Naples 2001
- La palla al balzo – un poeta allo stadio ("Catching the ball – A poet at the stadium"), Limina 2006

=== Theatre ===
- Il duello ("The duel"), Milan 1944, new ed. Salerno 1995

== Filmography ==
Alfonso Gatto also appeared in various films. In The Sun Still Rises (1946) by Aldo Vergano he was a train conductor. Other roles he had in two films by Pier Paolo Pasolini: in Il Vangelo secondo Matteo (1964) he was the apostle Andrew, in Teorema (1968) he was a physician. He also appeared in Cadaveri eccellenti (Illustrious Corpses) (1976) by Francesco Rosi where he was Nocio and in Caro Michele (1976), by Mario Monicelli, from the novel by Natalia Ginzburg, where he interpreted Michele's father.

Year	Title	Role	Notes
1946	The Sun Still Rises	Railroad conductor	
1964	Il Vangelo secondo Matteo	Andrea	
1968	Teorema	Doctor	
1976	Illustrious Corpses	Nocio	
1976	Caro Michele	Padre Vivanti	(final film role)

== See also ==
- Hermeticism (poetry)
- Mario Luzi
- Vittorio Sereni
- Natalia Ginzburg
- Pier Paolo Pasolini
- Giuseppe Ungaretti
- Eugenio Montale

== Bibliography ==
- (in English) P. Hainsworth, David Robey, eds., The Oxford Companion to Italian Literature, "Alfonso Gatto", OUP Oxford (2002).
- (in English) E. O'Ceallachain, Twentieth-century Italian Poetry: A Critical Anthology (1900 to the Neo-avantgarde), Troubador Publishing (2007).
- (in English) Alfonso GATTO. Centenario 1909–2009 , a poetry presentation by the Italian Cultural Institute of San Francisco, 2010.
- (in English) Barbara Carle, Poiein and Pictura in Alfonso Gatto’s "Rime di viaggio per la terra dipinta", on Journal ITALICA, Vol.83, Nos.3–4 (2006). Retrieved 1 June 2011.
- (in Italian) C. Muscetta, Pace e guerra nella poesia contemporanea: Da Alfonso Gatto a Umberto Saba, Bonacci (1984).
- (in Italian) S. Ramat, "Alfonso Gatto", in Dizionario critico della letteratura italiana, vol. 2, 1986.
- (in Italian) R. Aymone, L'età delle rose (1982).
- (in Italian) B. Carle, "Viaggio attraverso le Rime di Alfonso Gatto: i sonetti", in Letteratura e Oltre, Studi in onore di Giorgio Baroni, Fabrizio Serra Ed., 2012, pp. 578–582.
