= Senators for life in Italy =

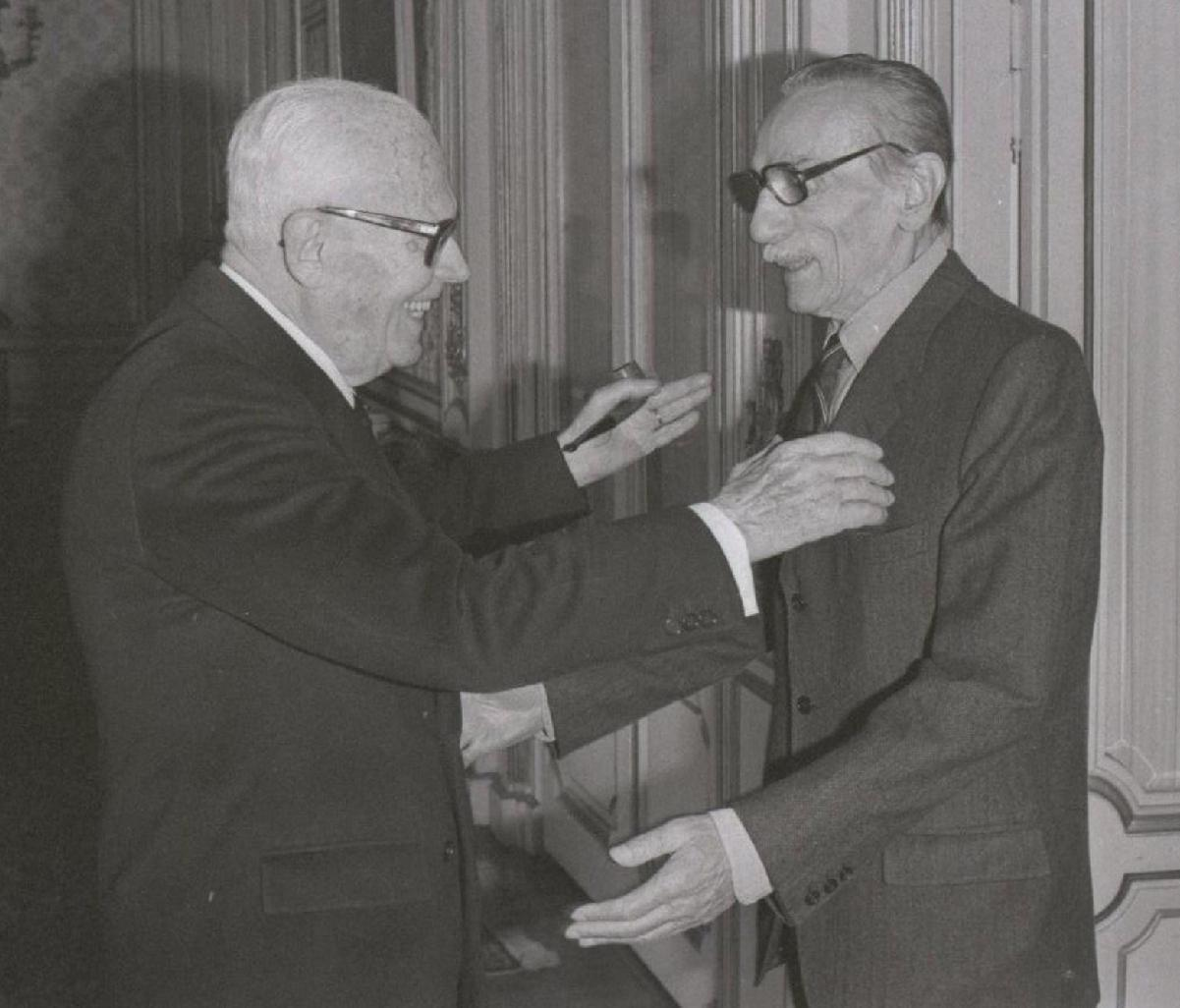
President Sandro Pertini (left) with actor Eduardo De Filippo, whom he appointed senator for life

Senators for life in Italy (Italian: senatori a vita; m. sing. senatore a vita; f. sing. senatrice a vita) are members of the Italian Senate who are either appointed by the President of the Italian Republic "for outstanding patriotic merits in the social, scientific, artistic or literary field" or are former presidents and thus senators for life ex officio. A maximum of five appointed senators for life can be in office at the same time.

Every Italian president has made at least one appointment of a senator for life, with the exception of Oscar Luigi Scalfaro (since in his term there were more than five) and inaugural officeholder Enrico De Nicola (whose provisional mandate only lasted two years). The president who appointed the highest number of senators for life was Luigi Einaudi, who made eight appointments during his term. Of the incumbent senators as of November 2026, President Giorgio Napolitano appointed professor Mario Monti on 9 November 2011, and researcher Elena Cattaneo, architect Renzo Piano and Nobel-laureate physicist Carlo Rubbia on 30 August 2013; President Sergio Mattarella appointed Holocaust survivor Liliana Segre on 19 January 2018.

Senators for life can decide not to be part of any parliamentary group, as opposed to elected senators who, if not affiliated with any specific political movement, automatically become members of the Mixed Group. As of November 2026, only four women have been nominated senators for life in Italy, namely politician Camilla Ravera, Nobel-laureate neurobiologist Rita Levi-Montalcini and incumbent senators Elena Cattaneo and Liliana Segre.

== Limitations ==
The Italian Constitution originally provided that the President of the Republic may appoint up to five senators for life. This resulted in a debate whether five was intended to be the maximum overall number of senators for life (restrictive interpretation), or if each president had the ability to appoint up to five senators, regardless of how many had been appointed by their predecessors and were still living (extensive interpretation). The former interpretation enjoyed the support of a majority of scholars until 1984, when President Sandro Pertini and his successor Francesco Cossiga applied the latter interpretation. Subsequent presidents applied varying standards. Oscar Luigi Scalfaro appointed none, in deference to the stricter reading, while both Carlo Azeglio Ciampi and Giorgio Napolitano appointed five each. The 2020 constitutional reform ended the debate by establishing unambiguously a limit of five overall appointed senators.

== List of senators for life ==
Currently serving

Portrait	Senator	Known for	Date of appointment	Appointed by	End of appointment (reason)	Length of appointment
	Enrico De Nicola	President (1946–1948)	12 May 1948	ex officio	1 October 1959 (death)	11 years, 142 days
	Guido Castelnuovo	Mathematician	5 December 1949	Luigi Einaudi	27 April 1952 (death)	2 years, 144 days
	Arturo Toscanini	Conductor	5 December 1949	Luigi Einaudi	7 December 1949 (resignation)	2 days
	Pietro Canonica	Sculptor, painter and conductor	1 December 1950	Luigi Einaudi	8 June 1959 (death)	8 years, 189 days
	Gaetano De Sanctis	Historian	1 December 1950	Luigi Einaudi	9 April 1957 (death)	6 years, 129 days
	Pasquale Jannaccone	Economist	1 December 1950	Luigi Einaudi	22 December 1959 (death)	9 years, 21 days
	Carlo Alberto Salustri	Poet	1 December 1950	Luigi Einaudi	21 December 1950 (death)	20 days
	Luigi Sturzo	Priest	17 September 1952	Luigi Einaudi	8 August 1959 (death)	6 years, 325 days
	Umberto Zanotti Bianco	Archeologist	17 September 1952	Luigi Einaudi	28 August 1963 (death)	10 years, 345 days
	Luigi Einaudi	President (1948–1955)	11 May 1955	ex officio	30 October 1961 (death)	6 years, 172 days
	Giuseppe Paratore	Politician and attorney	9 November 1957	Giovanni Gronchi	26 February 1967 (death)	9 years, 109 days
	Giovanni Gronchi	President (1955–1962)	11 May 1962	ex officio	17 October 1978 (death)	16 years, 159 days
	Cesare Merzagora	Politician	2 March 1963	Antonio Segni	1 May 1991 (death)	28 years, 60 days
	Ferruccio Parri	Prime Minister (1945)	2 March 1963	Antonio Segni	8 December 1981 (death)	18 years, 281 days
	Meuccio Ruini	Politician	2 March 1963	Antonio Segni	6 March 1970 (death)	7 years, 4 days
	Antonio Segni	Prime Minister (1955–1957, 1959–1960); President (1962–1964)	6 December 1964	ex officio	1 December 1972 (death)	7 years, 361 days
	Vittorio Valletta	Industrialist	28 November 1966	Giuseppe Saragat	10 August 1967 (death)	255 days
	Eugenio Montale	Poet and prose writer	13 June 1967	Giuseppe Saragat	12 September 1981 (death)	14 years, 91 days
	Giovanni Leone	Prime Minister (1963, 1968)	27 August 1967	Giuseppe Saragat	23 December 1971 (elected President)	4 years, 118 days
	Giovanni Leone	President (1971–1978)	15 June 1978	ex officio	9 November 2001 (death)	23 years, 147 days
	Pietro Nenni	Politician	25 November 1970	Giuseppe Saragat	1 January 1980 (death)	9 years, 37 days
	Giuseppe Saragat	President (1964–1971)	29 December 1971	ex officio	11 June 1988 (death)	16 years, 165 days
	Amintore Fanfani	Prime Minister (1954, 1958–1959, 1960–1963, 1982–1983, 1987)	10 March 1972	Giovanni Leone	20 November 1999 (death)	27 years, 255 days
	Leo Valiani	Historian, politician and journalist	12 January 1980	Sandro Pertini	18 September 1999 (death)	19 years, 249 days
	Eduardo De Filippo	Actor	28 September 1981	Sandro Pertini	31 October 1984 (death)	3 years, 33 days
	Camilla Ravera	Politician	8 January 1982	Sandro Pertini	14 April 1988 (death)	5 years, 257 days
	Carlo Bo	Poet	18 July 1984	Sandro Pertini	21 July 2001 (death)	17 years, 3 days
	Norberto Bobbio	Philosopher	18 July 1984	Sandro Pertini	9 January 2004 (death)	19 years, 175 days
	Sandro Pertini	President (1978–1985)	29 June 1985	ex officio	24 February 1990 (death)	4 years, 240 days
	Giovanni Spadolini	Prime Minister (1981–1982)	2 May 1991	Francesco Cossiga	4 August 1994 (death)	3 years, 94 days
	Giovanni Agnelli	Industrialist	1 June 1991	Francesco Cossiga	24 January 2003 (death)	11 years, 237 days
	Giulio Andreotti	Prime Minister (1972–1973, 1976–1979, 1989–1992)	1 June 1991	Francesco Cossiga	6 May 2013 (death)	21 years, 339 days
	Francesco De Martino	Politician	1 June 1991	Francesco Cossiga	18 November 2002 (death)	11 years, 170 days
	Paolo Emilio Taviani	Politician	1 June 1991	Francesco Cossiga	18 June 2001 (death)	10 years, 17 days
	Francesco Cossiga	Prime Minister (1979–1980); President (1985–1992)	28 April 1992	ex officio	17 August 2010 (death)	18 years, 111 days
	Oscar Luigi Scalfaro	President (1992–1999)	16 May 1999	ex officio	29 January 2012 (death)	12 years, 258 days
	Rita Levi-Montalcini	Neurobiologist	1 August 2001	Carlo Azeglio Ciampi	30 December 2012 (death)	11 years, 151 days
	Emilio Colombo	Prime Minister (1970–1972)	14 January 2003	Carlo Azeglio Ciampi	24 June 2013 (death)	10 years, 161 days
	Mario Luzi	Poet	14 October 2004	Carlo Azeglio Ciampi	28 February 2005 (death)	137 days
	Giorgio Napolitano	Politician	23 September 2005	Carlo Azeglio Ciampi	15 May 2006 (elected President)	235 days
	Giorgio Napolitano	President (2006–2015)	14 January 2015	ex officio	22 September 2023 (death)	8 years, 251 days
	Sergio Pininfarina	Designer	23 September 2005	Carlo Azeglio Ciampi	3 July 2012 (death)	6 years, 284 days
	Carlo Azeglio Ciampi	Economist and politician; Prime Minister (1993–1994); President (1999–2006)	16 May 2006	ex officio	16 September 2016 (death)	10 years, 123 days
	Mario Monti	Economist and politician; Prime Minister (2011–2013)	9 November 2011	Giorgio Napolitano	currently serving	14 years, 357 days
	Claudio Abbado	Conductor	30 August 2013	Giorgio Napolitano	20 January 2014 (death)	143 days
	Elena Cattaneo	Pharmacologist	30 August 2013	Giorgio Napolitano	currently serving	13 years, 63 days
	Renzo Piano	Architect	30 August 2013	Giorgio Napolitano	currently serving	13 years, 63 days
	Carlo Rubbia	Physicist	30 August 2013	Giorgio Napolitano	currently serving	13 years, 63 days
	Liliana Segre	Holocaust survivor and activist	19 January 2018	Sergio Mattarella	currently serving	8 years, 286 days
