= Carlo Bo =

Italian politician (1911–2001)

Senator for life Carlo Bo
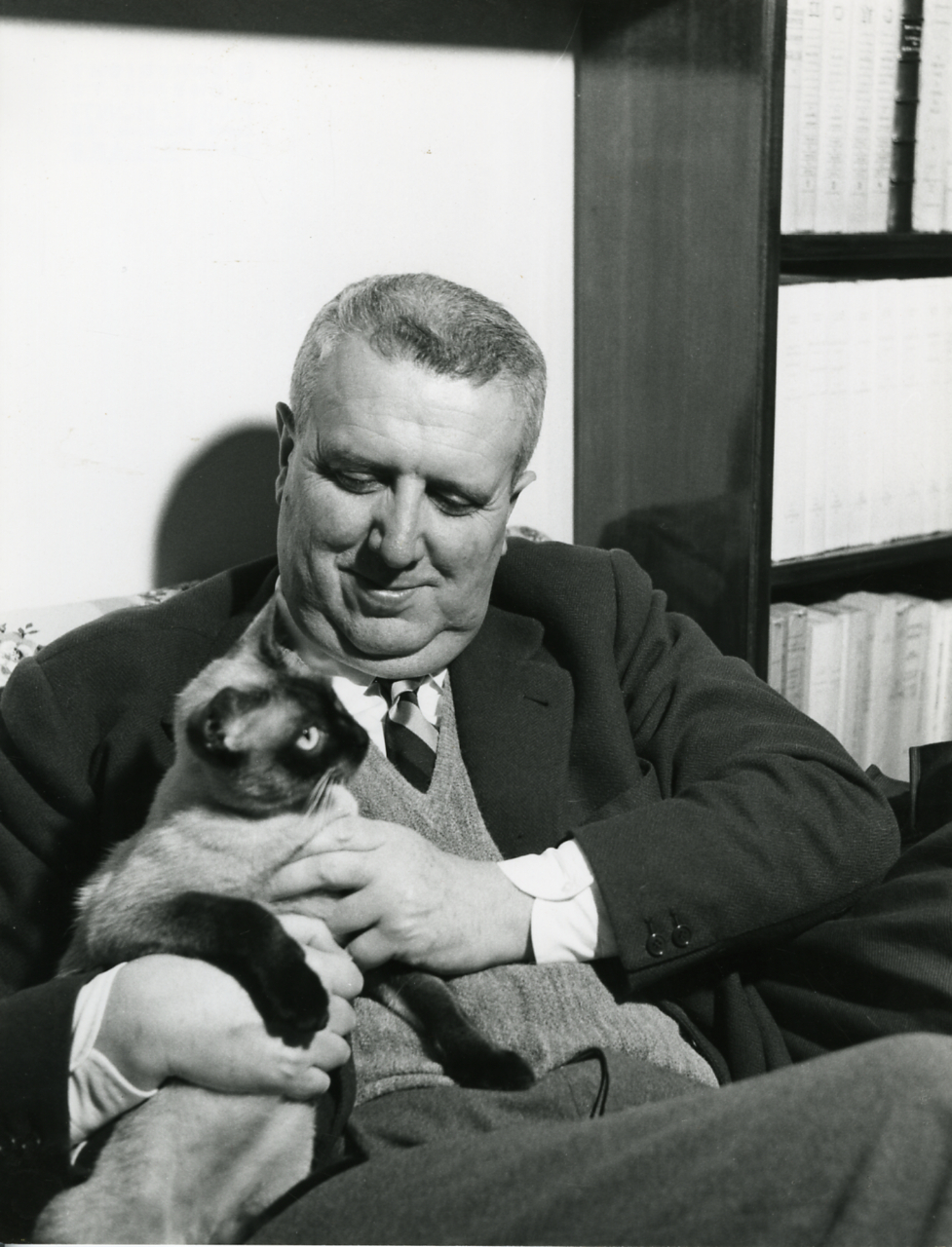
- Bo in 1954

Member of the Senate of the Republic
- Life tenure 18 July 1984 – 21 July 2001
- Appointed by: Sandro Pertini

Personal details
- Born: 25 January 1911 Sestri Levante, Italy
- Died: 21 July 2001 (aged 90) Genoa, Italy
- Profession: Professor, writer

Carlo Bo (25 January 1911 – 21 July 2001) was an Italian poet, literary critic, distinguished humanist, professor and senator for life from 1984.

== Biography ==
Bo was born on January 25, 1911, in Sestri Levante, Italy.

From 1929 to 1934, he attended the Faculty of Humanities at the University of Florence. Although he began studying classical literature, he soon switched to modern literature, in which he received his laurea in 1934.

Bo wrote his first book in 1935, a monograph on Jacques Riviere. Before the Second World War, in the year 1936, he published an essay on the literary magazine Il Frontespizio which gathered together the most relevant poets like Mario Luzi, and contemporary artists from Ottone Rosai to Giorgio Morandi and Quinto Martini. His essay was titled "Letteratura come vita (Literature as a way of life)", containing the theoretical-methodological fundamentals of hermetic poetry.

In 1939 he began teaching French literature at the University of Urbino. Bo was the rector of University of Urbino from 1947 until his death, for more than 50 years.

Bo was appointed a senator for life on July 18, 1984, and has been a member of several parties. He served with the Christian Democrats from 1987 to 1994; the Italian People's Party from 1994 to 2001; and The Daisy from 2001 until his death later that year.

Bo died in Genoa on July 21, 2001.

== Legacy ==
His focus on hermetic poetry was to become a strong poetical movement comprising important poets, such as Salvatore Quasimodo and Eugenio Montale, both of whom would go on to receive the Nobel Prize in Literature (1959, 1975). Carlo Bo himself, however, never did and, at the age of 86, was rendered incapable of understanding Dario Fo's 1997 receipt of the Nobel Prize in Literature, saying "I must be too old to understand. What does this mean? That everything changes, even literature has changed."

Bo is credited with writing roughly 40 books and would also found the national Gentile da Fabriano prize.
