= L'allegria =

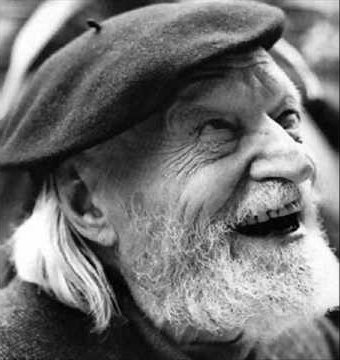
Giuseppe Ungaretti wearing a beret

L'allegria ("Joy", "Happiness", or better, "Merriness") is a collection of poems published by Giuseppe Ungaretti in 1931. It was an expanded version of a 1919 collection Allegria di naufragi ("Merriness of Shipwrecks"). Many of the poems were written in reaction to Ungaretti's experience as a soldier of World War I.

Poems from L'allegria have been translated by Charles Tomlinson.
