= Campo di Marte (magazine) =

Literary magazine in Italy (1938–1939)

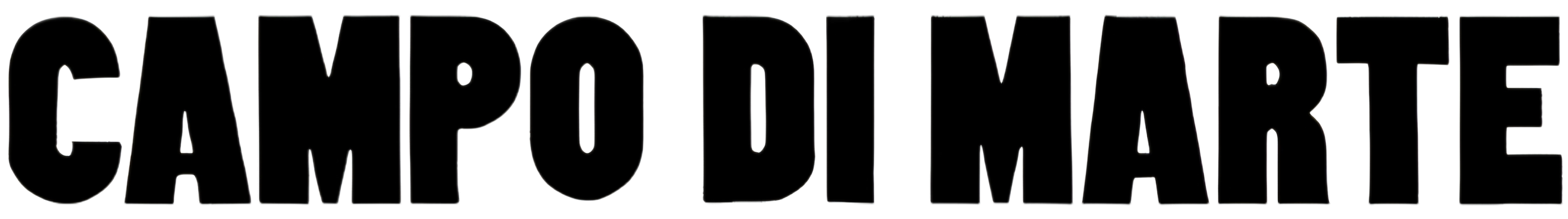
- Categories: Literary magazine
- Founder: Vasco Pratolini; Alfonso Gatto
- First issue: August 1938
- Final issue: August 1939
- Country: Italy
- Based in: Florence
- Language: Italian

Campo di Marte (Italian: Field of Mars) was a literary magazine published briefly from 1938 to 1939 in Florence, Italy.

== History and profile ==
Campo di Marte was established by Vasco Pratolini and Alfonso Gatto in August 1938. They also edited the magazine, which had its headquarters in Florence.

Campo di Marte declared its goal as "to educate the people" about the arts. It had a sceptical approach towards the European avant-garde and modernist experience as well as to mass culture. The magazine had an anti-fascist political leaning. It openly questioned several aspects of the fascist regime in Italy. It was subjected to censorship and closed down by the regime in August 1939 after only twelve issues.

== See also ==
- List of magazines in Italy
