= Elena Cattaneo =

Italian academic

Senator for Life Elena Cattaneo OMRI
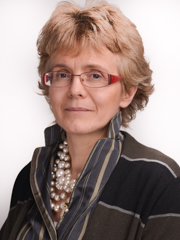

Member of the Senate of the Republic
- Incumbent
- Life tenure 30 August 2013
- Appointed by: Giorgio Napolitano

Personal details
- Born: 22 October 1962 (age 63) Milan, Italy
- Spouse: Enzo Rivolta
- Education: University of Milan

Elena Cattaneo OMRI (Italian pronunciation: [ˈɛːlena katˈtaːneo]; born 22 October 1962) is an Italian pharmacologist and co-founding director of the University of Milan's Center for Stem Cell Research.

She is a known Huntington's disease researcher and stem cell research advocate. She is internationally recognised for her commitment to research ethics and research policy, and for increasing knowledge and engagement in research among the general public.

On 30 August 2013, she was appointed senator for life in the Italian Parliament.

== Biography ==
Cattaneo was born in Milan. After graduating (summa cum laude) in pharmacy in 1986, she moved to Boston in the United States for a few years, where she specialized at the Massachusetts Institute of Technology. She studied neural stem cell differentiation in the area of the human brain associated with degenerative diseases under Professor Ronald McKay. Another of her mentors was Professor Anders Björklund of the University of Lund. Cattanaeo spent a short time with him in Sweden learning grafting techniques that could be used on stem cells. Returning to Italy she started her academic career in the University of Milan. She lived in Brugherio and worked in Milan.

She is now full professor at the Laboratory of Stem Cell Biology and Pharmacology of Neurodegenerative Diseases in the Department of Biosciences of University of Milan.

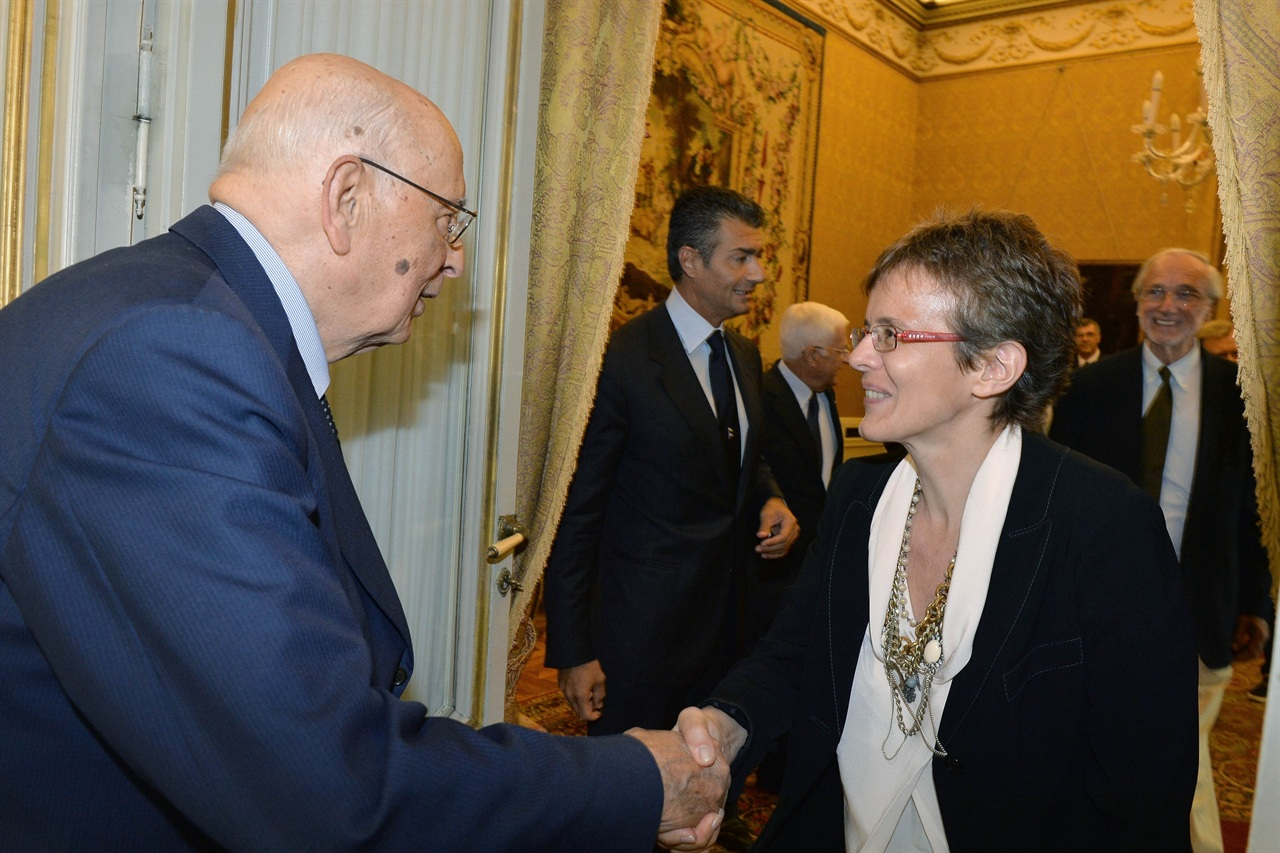
Former President Napolitano and Senator Cattaneo

Cattaneo was appointed to the Senate of Italy as a Senator for life, the youngest in Italian history, by then President Giorgio Napolitano on 30 August 2013, along with Claudio Abbado, Renzo Piano and Carlo Rubbia. Of his choice of her as Senator for Life, President Napolitano said: "choosing her is meant as an appreciation and an encouragement for many Italians of the new generations who commit themselves, amid difficulties, to scientific research".

Cattaneo has used her position to oppose unfounded claims made by companies offering stem cell remedies. The scientifically unsupported claims were primarily being made by a private well-connected company called the Stamina Foundation which had been started in 2009. The Stamina therapy involved recommending stem cells for a range of conditions with little or no scientific proof of their efficacy. Journalists including prestigious employees of the journal Nature were lied to and threatened. The scientific community's consensus was against Stamina. Stamina took advantage of the well meaning supporters of very ill people who believed that Stamina's claims was their only hope.

In 2012 the debate appeared to be settled when the Italian Medicines Agency declared Stamina's methods unsafe, however the Foundation appealed to their supporters and they appealed to the politicians and the courts. The courts cited compassion as the reason that they gave in to many of the 450 appeals who demanded the courts should allow patients to receive the stem cell "panacea". Some politicians went further and used government money to fund a multi-million-pound trial. It was not until August 2014 that a court in Turin demanded that not only should Stamina stop but their equipment should also be confiscated. This was possible because of the support of Cattaneo, a senator. As soon as Cattaneo became a senator she used her senatorial powers to demand evidence against Stamina that others had been denied. January 2014 saw the beginning of 25 hearings by the 15-strong enquiry. The eventual enquiry report demanded a number of points including that courts should always have scientific representation in cases of this sort. It was reported that the "Stamina case ... shows the influence that individual scientists can have in fighting anti-science forces."

Cattaneo has also been awarded the Medaglia teresiana by the University of Pavia, in 2013. In 2015, Nature dedicated an editorial to laud the work that Cattaneo and her supporters had achieved.

In 2016, Cattaneo helped raising concerns about three anti-GMO papers by Federico Infascelli at the University of Naples, which were later retracted from Nature. Nature News reported that Cattaneo found that certain images in those papers had been deleted or tampered with, and that some images in different studies were identical, despite captions claiming that they were the results of novel experiments. Her suspicions led to an investigation by the University of Naples, which also found evidence of data manipulation.

In 2017, Cattaneo and Ignacio Munoz-Sanjuan organized the event HD as part of a campaign called HDdennomore, pronounced "Hidden no more" (HD is an acronym for the Huntington's disease), which aims to relieve families of the stigma of the disease, particularly those in poor communities in South America where the condition is most common. The event was brought about after Cattaneo wrote to Pope Francis last summer and asked him to meet with someone with the disease.

In 2018, Cattaneo was selected to be a new honorary doctor at the Faculty of Medicine at Lund University. Cattaneo has strong links to the research field at Lund University, where she spent time conducting research since the 1990s, and has continued since then.
