= Camilla Ravera =

Italian politician (1889–1988)

Senator for life Camilla Ravera
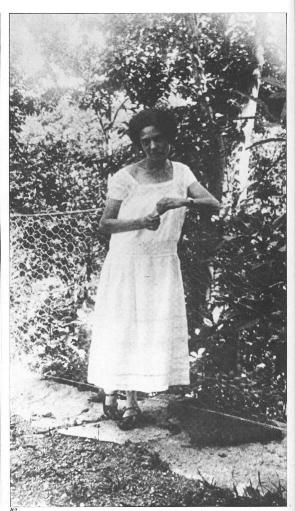

Member of the Senate of the Republic
- Life tenure 8 January 1982 – 14 April 1988
- Appointed by: Sandro Pertini

Member of the Chamber of Deputies
- In office 8 May 1948 – 11 June 1958
- Constituency: Turin

Personal details
- Born: 18 June 1889 Acqui Terme, Kingdom of Italy
- Died: 14 April 1988 (aged 98) Rome, Italy
- Party: PCI

Camilla Ravera (18 June 1889 – 14 April 1988) was an Italian politician and the first female lifetime senator. She was also among the driving forces behind Italian feminism.

Ravera participated in the founding of the Italian Communist Party in 1921. She was General Secretary of the party from 1927 until 1930 following the arrest of Antonio Gramsci.

Ravera attended various congresses of Comintern, meeting both Vladimir Lenin and Joseph Stalin in person. She was arrested in 1930 and was sentenced to 15 years. After her arrest, she was succeeded as General Secretary by Palmiro Togliatti. Along with Umberto Terracini, she was expelled from the Italian Communist Party for opposing the Molotov–Ribbentrop Pact in 1939 and was not allowed to rejoin until 1945.

== Early life ==
Ravera first entered socialist circles after delivering her brother Cesare's dues to the Italian Socialist Party, of which she later became a member. Ravera began writing essays promoting socialism, and later moved to Turin to become a teacher. Her writings attracted the attention of Antonio Gramsci, who invited her to write columns for his newspaper L’Ordine Nuovo. In July 1921, she joined the paper's editorial board.

== Political career ==
=== Communist Party of Italy ===
In November 1922, Ravera attended Comintern’s Fourth Congress as a delegate for the Communist Party of Italy. Here she met important figures within the communist movement, including Clara Zetkin, Khristo Kabakchiev, Joseph Stalin, and Vladimir Lenin. After the March on Rome, the Communist Party was forced underground, with Ravera becoming a wanted figure under Mussolini's regime. She became the General Secretary of the party in 1927. She partook in Comintern's Sixth Congress in 1928 in Moscow, and was offered permanent residency in the city, which she declined. On 10 July 1930, at Lake Maggiore, Ravera was arrested.

=== Italian Communist Party ===
After World War II, Ravera became a part of the Italian Communist Party, the successor to the Communist Party of Italy. She served as a member of the Italian Parliament as a member of the party, where she signed onto bills, including those which focused on the protection of mothers and equal wages for women. Ravera retired from this role in 1958.

== Honours ==
In 1982, Italian President Sandro Pertini made Camilla Ravera a Senator for Life.

== Electoral history ==
Election	House	Constituency	Party	Votes	Result
1948	Chamber of Deputies	Turin–Novara–Vercelli	FDP	68,716	Elected
1953	Chamber of Deputies	Turin–Novara–Vercelli	PCI	43,650	Elected
