= Salvatore Quasimodo =

Italian poet and translator (1901–1968)

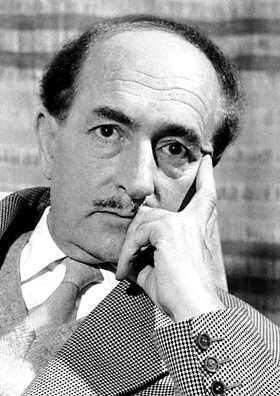
- Born: 20 August 1901; Modica, Sicily, Kingdom of Italy
- Died: 14 June 1968 (aged 66); Naples, Campania, Italy
- Resting place: Cimitero Monumentale, Milan
- Occupation: Author
- Writing career
- Notable awards: Nobel Prize in Literature; 1959
- Literary movement: Hermeticism

Signature
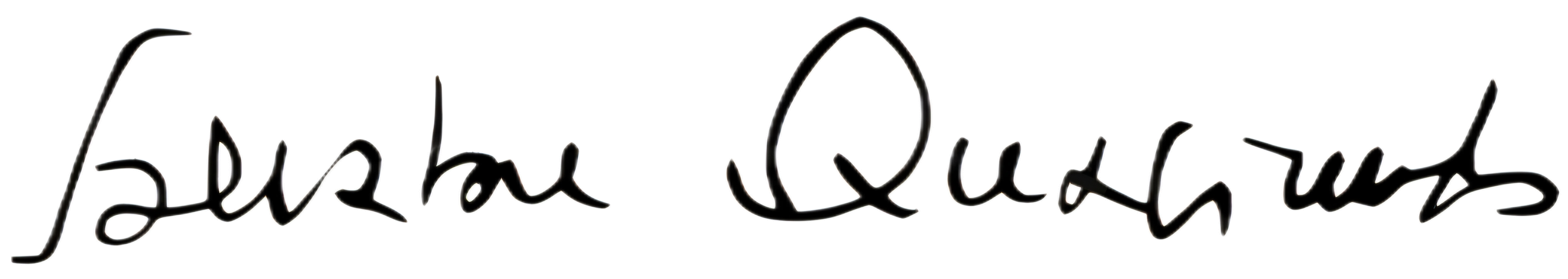

Salvatore Quasimodo (Italian: [salvaˈtoːre kwaˈziːmodo]; 20 August 1901 – 14 June 1968) was an Italian poet and translator, awarded the 1959 Nobel Prize in Literature "for his lyrical poetry, which with classical fire expresses the tragic experience of life in our own times". Along with Giuseppe Ungaretti and Eugenio Montale, he was one of the foremost Italian poets of the 20th century.

== Biography ==
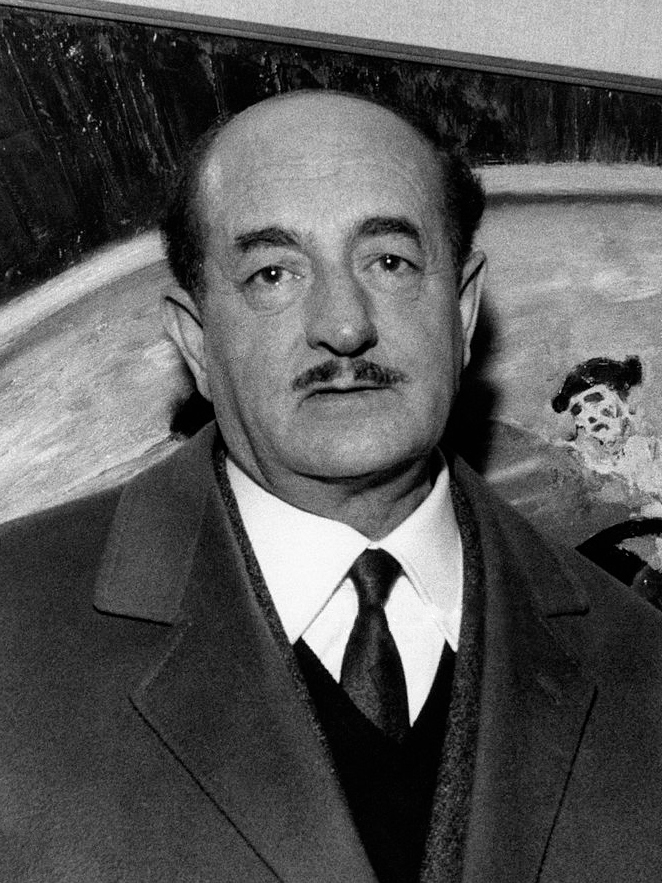
Quasimodo in 1968

Quasimodo was born in Modica, Sicily, into a Sicilian-Greek family. His paternal grandmother, Rosa (née Papandreou), was from Patras, Greece. Quasimodo integrated both of his ancestries in his works, in which he defined himself as a "Siculo-Greco" (lit. 'Sicilian-Greek'). In his biography for Elio Filippo Accrocca, he even sought to relocate his birthplace to Syracuse, the most notable city of Magna Graecia, instead of Modica, where he was actually born.

Quasimodo spent his childhood in Roccalumera. In 1908 his family moved to Messina, as his father had been sent there to help the local population struck by a devastating earthquake. The impressions of the effects of natural forces would have a great impact on the young Quasimodo. In 1919 he graduated from the local Technical College. In Messina, he also made friends with Giorgio La Pira, future mayor of Florence.

Salvatore Quasimodo was introduced to the Scottish Rite Freemasonry by his father, who was a member of the Masonic Lodge "Arnaldo da Brescia". The Grand Orient of Italy has recognized Quasimodo as one of his most notable brothers.

In 1917 Quasimodo founded the short-lived Nuovo giornale letterario ("New Literary Journal"), in which he published his first poems. In 1919 he moved to Rome to finish his engineering studies, but poor economic conditions forced him to find work as a technical draughtsman. In the meantime, he collaborated with several reviews and studied Greek and Latin.

In 1929, invited by Elio Vittorini, who had married Quasimodo's sister, he moved to Florence. Here he met poets such as Alessandro Bonsanti and Eugenio Montale. In 1930 he took a job with Italy's Civil Engineering Corps in Reggio Calabria. Here he met the Misefari brothers, who encouraged him to continue writing. Developing his nearness to the hermetic movement, Quasimodo published his first collection, Acque e terre ("Waters and Earths") in that year.

In 1931 he was transferred to Imperia and then to Genoa, where he got acquainted with Camillo Sbarbaro and other personalities of the Circoli magazine, with which Quasimodo started a fruitful collaboration. In 1932 he published with them a new collection, Oboe sommerso, including all his lyrics from 1930 to 1932.

In 1934 Quasimodo moved to Milan. Starting from 1938 he devoted himself entirely to writing, working with Cesare Zavattini and for Letteratura, the official review of the Hermetic movement. In 1938 he published Poesie, followed by the translations of Lirici Greci ("Greek Poets") published by Corrente di Vita in 1939.

Though an outspoken anti-Fascist, during World War II Quasimodo did not take part in the Italian resistance against the German occupation. In that period he devoted himself to the translation of the Gospel of John, of some of Catullus's cantos, and several episodes of the Odyssey. In 1945 he joined the Italian Communist Party, but only remained a member for a short period.

In 1946 he published another collection, Giorno dopo giorno ("Day After Day"), which made clear the increasing moral engagement and the epic tone of the social criticism of the author. The same theme characterized his next works, La vita non è sogno ("Life Is Not a Dream"), Il falso e il vero verde ("The False and True Green") and La terra impareggiabile ("The Incomparable Land"). In all this period Quasimodo did not stop producing translations of classic authors and collaborating as a journalist for some of the most prestigious Italian publications (mostly with articles about the theatre).

In the 1950s Quasimodo won the following literary awards: Premio San Babila (1950), Premio Etna-Taormina (1953), Premio Viareggio (1958) and, finally, the Nobel Prize for Literature (1959). In 1960 and 1967 he received honoris causa degrees from the Universities of Messina and Oxford, respectively.

In his last years, the poet made numerous voyages to Europe and America, giving public speeches and public lectures on his poems, which had been translated into several foreign languages.

=== Death ===
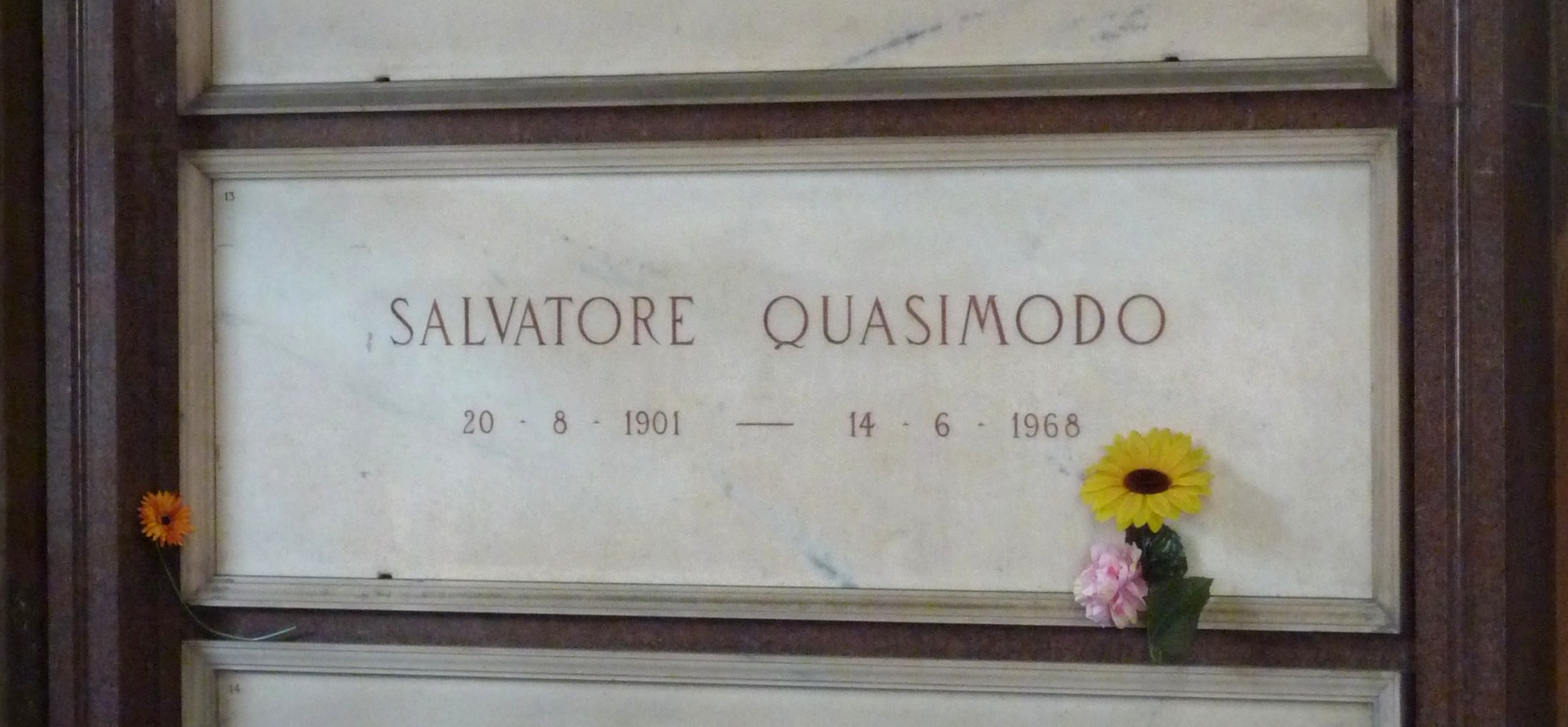
Quasimodo's grave at the Cimitero Monumentale in Milan in 2015

In June 1968, when he was in Amalfi for a discourse, Quasimodo was struck by a cerebral haemorrhage. He died a few days later in the hospital in Naples. He was interred in the Cimitero Monumentale in Milan.

== Poetic language ==
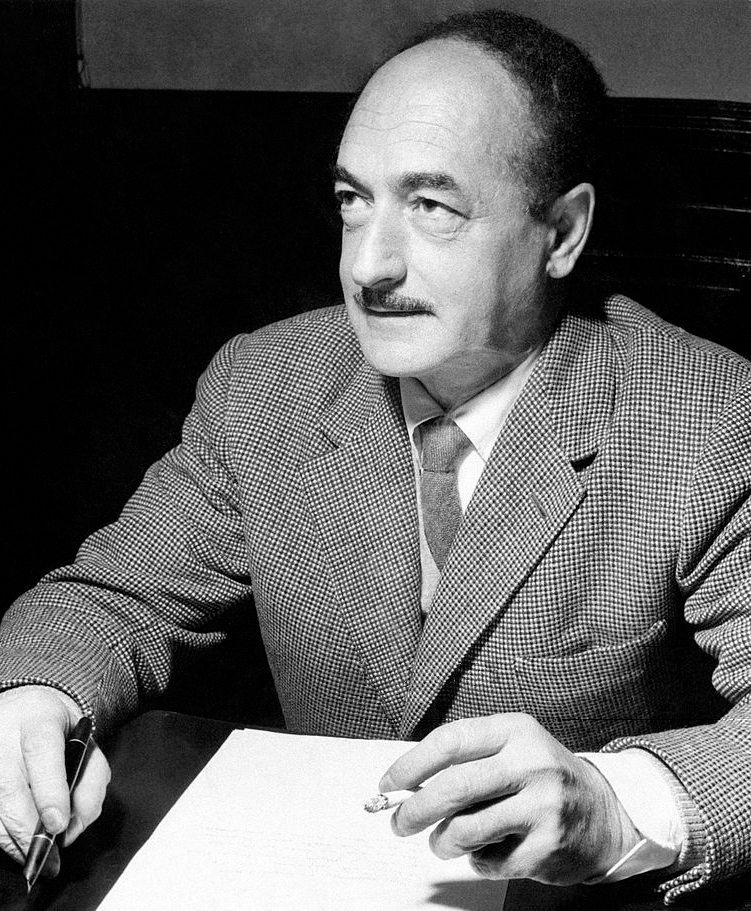
Quasimodo in 1958

Traditional literary critique divides Quasimodo's work into two major periods: the hermetic period until World War II and the post-hermetic era until his death. Although these periods are distinct, they can be seen as a single poetical quest. This quest or exploration for a unique language took him through various stages and various modalities of expression.

As an intelligent and clever poet, Quasimodo used a hermetical, "closed" language to sketch recurring motifs like Sicily, religion and death. Subsequently, the translation of authors from Roman and Greek Antiquity enabled him to extend his linguistic toolkit. The disgust and sense of absurdity of World War II also had an impact on the poet's language. This bitterness, however, faded in his late writings and was replaced by the mature voice of an old poet reflecting upon his world.

== Global policy ==
He was one of the signatories of the agreement to convene a convention for drafting a world constitution. As a result, for the first time in human history, a World Constituent Assembly convened to draft and adopt the Constitution for the Federation of Earth.

Preceded by Boris Pasternak	Nobel Prize in Literature winner 1959	Succeeded by Saint-John Perse
