= Giorgio Caproni =

Italian poet

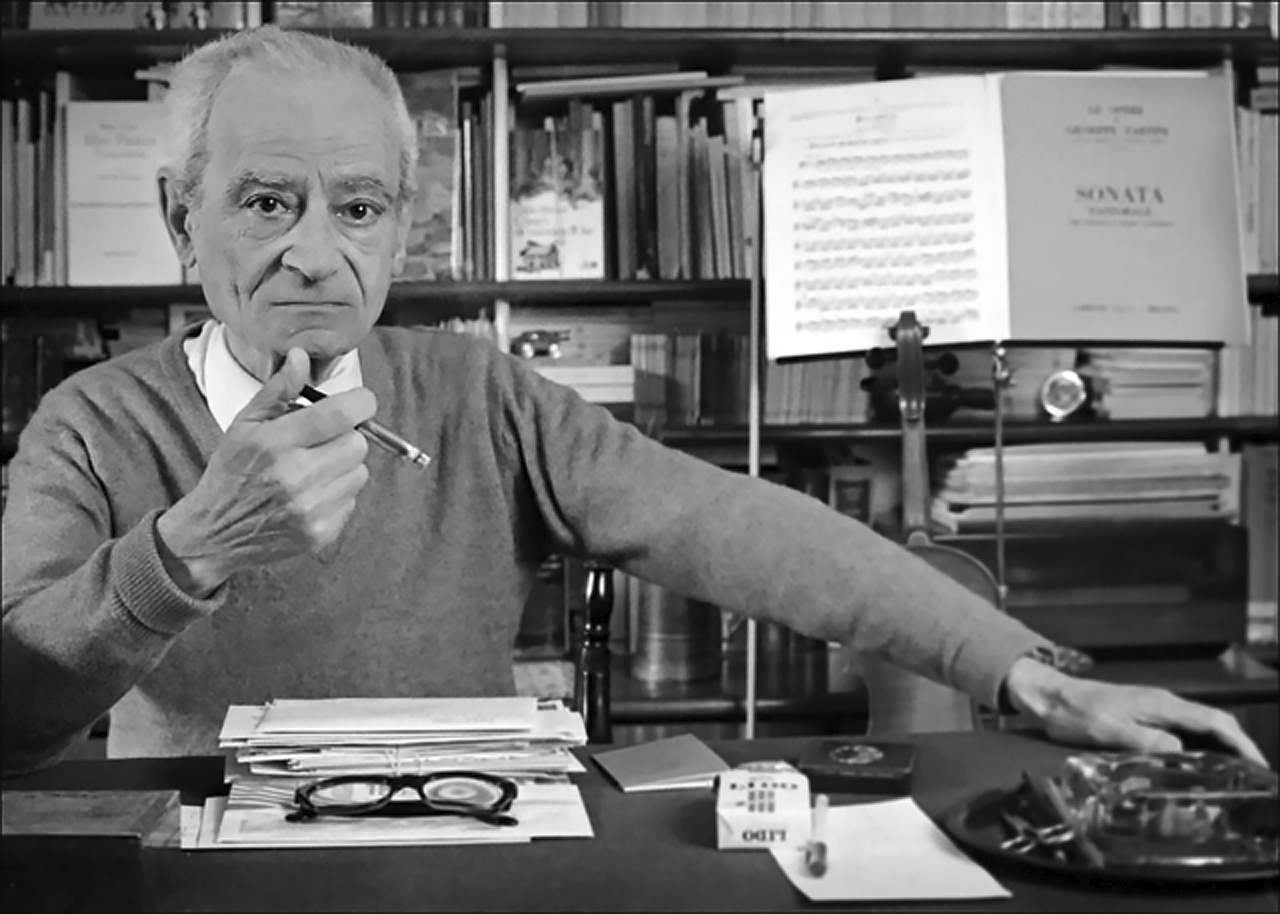
Caproni in 1983

Giorgio Caproni (Livorno, 7 January 1912 – 22 January 1990, Rome) was an Italian poet, literary critic and translator, especially from French. His work was also part of the literature event in the art competition at the 1948 Summer Olympics.

== Early years ==
Caproni left Livorno at the age of ten to complete his primary studies in Genoa, where he studied first music, then literature, and where he wrote his first poems. After participating in World War II as a member of the Italian resistance movement, he spent many years as an elementary school teacher.

== Career ==
In 1945, he went to Rome, where he contributed to a number of journals; besides poetry, he also wrote criticism and novellas and contributed translations. His book Il passaggio di Enea collected all of his poems written to 1956 and reflected his experiences in combat during World War II and serving with the Resistance. He also oversaw a series of translations of foreign works, chief among which was Death on Credit by Louis-Ferdinand Céline.

In 1959, Caproni and fellow poets Antonio Seccareccia, Elio Filippo Accrocca, and Ugo Royal began the Frascati National Poetry Prize, an annual poetry competition for previously unpublished works. The annual prize began as a cask of wine; in 1974, it was changed to a cash prize of 1,000,000 Italian lira.

Caproni's poetry touches on a number of recurring themes, most notably Genoa, his mother and birthplace, and travel, and combines a sense of refinement in both meter and style to immediacy and clarity of feeling. Among his other works:

- Le stanze della funicolare (1952)
- Il seme del piangere (1959)
- Congedo del viaggiatore cerimonioso & altre prosopopee (1965)
- Il muro della terra (1975)
- Il franco cacciatore (1982)
- Conte di Kevenhüller (1986)
- L'opera in versi (1998), containing his complete output
- Per lei
