= Gino Cantarelli =

Italian painter

Gino Cantarelli (1899 – 1950) was an Italian Dadaist poet and painter of the early 20th century. He was associated first with Futurism, then with Dada. He often wrote his poems in French.

Born in Mantua, from 1917 to 1920, Cantarelli published the journal Procellaria, together with Aldo Fiozzi, a publication which combined Futurist and Dadaist tendencies. In 1920, the two editors joined with Julius Evola to publish Bleu, which was devoted entirely to Dada and which appeared in Mantua, like the earlier journal. He was associated with the early Dadaist Mantova group.

== Bibliography ==
- Bohn, Willard. The Dada Market. 1993, Southern Illinois University Press. An anthology of Dada poetry, which includes a short biographical entry on Gino Cantarelli, as well as including three of his Dadaist poems, all three written in French.
- "Professor Joaquim Molas: memòria, escriptura, història ( LITERATURA DEL SEGLE XX ) eBook", Edicions Universitat Barcelona
