= Mario Luzi =

Italian poet (1914–2005)

Senator for life Mario Luzi
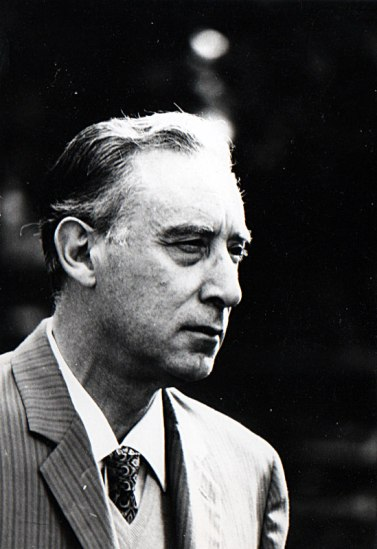
- Mario Luzi in the 1970s.
- Born: 20 October 1914; Sesto Fiorentino, Kingdom of Italy
- Died: 28 February 2005 (aged 90); Florence, Italy
- Occupation: Poet
- Writing career
- Period: 1935–2005

Member of the Senate of the Republic
- Lifetime tenure 14 October 2004 – 28 February 2005
- Appointed by: Carlo Azeglio Ciampi

Mario Luzi (20 October 1914 – 28 February 2005) was an Italian poet.

== Biography ==
=== Early life and education ===
Born in Castello, near Sesto Fiorentino, Luzi's parents, Ciro Luzi and Margherita Papini, hailed from Samprugnano (later Semproniano). He spent his youth in Castello, where he started his primary school. In Florence he studied at the liceo classico Galileo. Luzi took a degree in French literature from the University of Florence with a final dissertation about François Mauriac. This was an important period for Luzi. He met poets such as Piero Bigongiari, Alessandro Parronchi, Carlo Bo, Leone Traverso, and the critic Oreste Macrì.

=== Teaching career and early work ===
In 1938 Luzzi started to teach in high schools in the cities of Parma, San Miniato, Rome and Florence. In 1955 he began teaching French literature at the University of Florence.

His early poetry collections – La barca (1935), Avvento notturno (1940), Un brindisi (1946), Quaderno gotico (1947) – combine daring analogical transitions and classicism of form in the manner of Mallarmé.

Primizie dal deserto (1952) and Onore del vero (1960) confront more directly the problems of man's constitutional weakness and the relationship between poetry and history, time and eternity, with noticeable influence from T. S. Eliot and Montale's Occasioni.

=== Literary fame ===
A further phase is evident in Nel magma (1963), Dal fondo delle campagne (1965), and Su fondamenti invisibili (1971), which abandon regular form for freer longer lines, and show a new preference for narrative discourse. In the following collections, Al fuoco della controversia (1978), Per il battesimo dei nostri frammenti (1985), Frasi e incisi di un canto salutare (1990), and Viaggio terrestre e celeste di Simone Martini (1994), the emphasis falls more on problems of earthly existence. The verse takes on a broken quality in its search for a musical union of sense and sound. The symbolist aim for words which speak of eternal values is now directly set against the dramatic inauthenticity of historical events, illuminated only by faith that reality must have a sense and the hope of ultimate Christian reconciliation.

In 1978, with the book Al fuoco della controversia, Luzzi won the Viareggio Prize (Premio Viareggio). He won the Aristeion Prize in 1991 for his work Frasi e Incisi di un Canto Salutare; in the same year he was proposed for the first time by the Accademia dei Lincei for the Nobel Prize in Literature. Ultimately never awarded, when asked for his thoughts by one reporter on his fellow countryman Dario Fo's 1997 success he slammed the phone down: "I'll say only this. I've just about had it up to here!"

=== Later life ===
His last book, L'avventura della dualità, was published in 2003. In October 2004, he was appointed to the Italian Senate as a senator-for-life by President of the Republic Ciampi. He died in Florence, just some months later, on 28 February 2005.

=== Translations, theatre and literary criticism ===
As well as criticism and translations (particularly of French symbolists), Luzi has written plays, collected as Teatro (1993), in which, following the model of Eliot, meditation prevails over action.

== List of works ==
- La barca (1935)
- Avvento notturno (1940)
- Biografia a Ebe (1942)
- Un brindisi (1946)
- Quaderno gotico (1947)
- Primizie del deserto (1952)
- Onore del vero (1957)
- Il giusto della vita (1960)
- Nel magma (1963; new edition, 1966)
- Dal fondo delle campagne (1965)
- Su fondamenti invisibili (1971)
- Al fuoco della controversia (1978)
- Semiserie (1979)
- Reportage, un poemetto seguito dal Taccuino di viaggio in Cina (1980)
- Per il battesimo dei nostri frammenti (1985)
- La cordigliera delle Ande e altri versi tradotti (1983)
- Frasi e incisi di un canto salutare (1990)
- Viaggio terrestre e celeste di Simone Martini (1994)
- Il fiore del dolore (2003)
- L'avventura della dualità (2003)
