= Antonio Garbasso =

Italian politician and physicist (1871–1933)

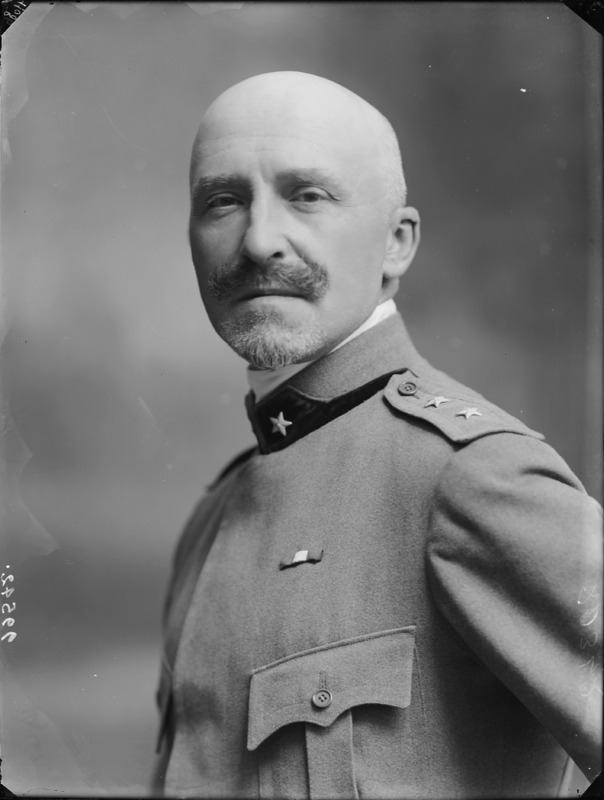
Antonio Garbasso

Antonio Garbasso (16 April 1871 – 14 March 1933) was an Italian physicist and National Fascist Party politician. He was the 14th mayor of Florence in the Kingdom of Italy and the 1st podestà of Florence during Fascist Italy.

== Early life ==
Garbasso was born in Vercelli on 16 April 1871. After completing his high school studies at the Vincenzo Gioberti classical high school in Turin, he graduated in physics at the University of Turin in 1892 with Andrea Naccari, already standing out during his studies both for his experimental research on the variation of the resistance of iron and nickel in a magnetic field, and for some studies on the electric and magnetic vectors in plane waves. Immediately afterwards, he went to Germany to follow some advanced courses, first under the guidance of Heinrich Hertz at the University of Bonn and then of Hermann von Helmholtz and Emil Aschkinass at the University of Berlin.

== Career ==
Having returned to Italy, Garbasso continued his research in Turin (where in 1894 obtained a libera docenza in experimental physics) on the possible relationships between optical and electromagnetic phenomena in matter, a topic that Garbasso had been dealing with since his laurea thesis, which focused on an effect discovered by Augusto Righi in 1878 regarding the rotational polarization of light. The experiences and studies of this period would prove to be precursors of many results that would later be achieved by other foreign scholars in the electromagnetic theory of radiation, which would pave the way for the study of optical resonance.

In 1895, having obtained a teaching position in mathematical physics at the University of Pisa, Garbasso taught mathematical physics there until 1897, when he moved again to the University of Turin, where he remained until 1903. Here, still as a lecturer in mathematical physics, he taught various courses on new electromagnetic theory of light according to James Clerk Maxwell, and also carried out studies and research on X-rays, recently discovered by Wilhelm Conrad Röntgen. In 1903, having won two competitions for the chair of both mathematical physics and experimental physics, he opted for the latter, becoming associate professor of experimental physics at the University of Genoa, where he remained until 1913, when he moved to the same chair at the Istituto di Studi Superiori di Firenze, taking over from Antonio Roiti, where he remained until his death. In Florence, in addition to strengthening the Physics Institute of Arcetri, he contributed to the creation of a school of physics, calling many of the most brilliant minds in Italian physics of the time. Among his students and assistants were Antonino Lo Surdo, Rita Brunetti, Giuseppe Occhialini, Bruno Rossi, Franco Rasetti, Francesco Rodolico, and Vasco Ronchi.

Garbasso participated as a volunteer in the First World War, where he obtained the rank of major for his studies of telefonometry applied to ballistics. Animated by Italian nationalistic fervors, he shared Italian fascist ideology but always maintained moderate positions, opposing the Gentile Reform of 1923 whose ideological framework, among other things, put scientific disciplines into the background. He was elected mayor of Florence in the 1920 elections, won by the National Bloc, remaining in office until 1927, except for a brief period of two months in 1923 when he was replaced by the prefectural commissioner Bruno Fornaciari. In 1924, he was appointed to the Senate of the Kingdom of Italy, maintaining the office of mayor of Florence. On 29 August 1926, among other things, with the merger between the football sections of the Palestra Ginnastica Fiorentina Libertas and the Club Sportivo Firenze, decided on the initiative of him and the Marquis Luigi Ridolfi, the new Associazione Calcio Firenze was established; after a few days, it changed its name to Associazione Fiorentina del Calcio. On 9 January 1927, the municipal administration was dissolved due to the entry into force of law no. 237 of 4 February 1926, which established the podestà, for which Garbasso was appointed first podestà of Florence, remaining in office only until 13 September 1928 when he was replaced by Giuseppe della Gherardesca.

Since 1895, Garbasso devoted himself to electromagnetism in the new direction impressed by Maxwell, with many innovative results. From 1905 onwards, he devoted himself to spectroscopy, precisely in the period of greatest development of this discipline, contributing with original theoretical results corroborated by experiments conducted above all at the Istituto di Studi Superiori in Florence, where both Antonio Roiti and Luigi Puccianti had taken care to adequately equip the physics laboratories. Among these results, most of which were collected in one of the first monographs on theoretical spectroscopy. Of note were some experimental works conducted together with Antonino Lo Surdo, which led the latter to the discovery of the effect that would later be called the Stark-Lo Surdo effect, one of the first empirical bases of the new quantum mechanics that Garbasso would contribute among the first to making known and spreading in Italy. In 1918, Garbasso created a laboratory of optics and precision mechanics, which over the years under the auspices of the National Research Council (CNR) would become the future National Institute of Optics (INO).

He died in Florence.

== Selected works ==
- Sulla luce polarizzata circolare e particolarmente sulla sua velocità nei mezzi dotati di potere rotatorio magnetico, Tip. Guadagnini, Turin, 1892.
- Sulla luce bianca, "Atti della R. Acc. delle Scienze di Torino", vol. XXX, 16 December 1894.
- Sopra i raggi del Rontgen (with Angelo Battelli), Nuovo Cimento, 4, vol. III, January 1896.
- Raggi catodici e raggi X (with Angelo Battelli), Nuovo Cimento, 4, vol. III, May 1896.
- Su la polarizzazione rotatoria dei raggi di forza elettrica, Nuovo Cimento, 5, vol. IV, September 1902.
- Teoria elettromagnetica dell'emissione della luce, Mem. della R. Acc. delle Scienze di Torino, II, III, 6 February 1903.
- L'aereo Artom e la dirigibilità delle onde elettriche, Vincenzo Bona, Turin, 1909.
- Su la teoria degli spettri a doublets, Istituto di Fisica della R. Università di Genova, Pisa, 1909.
- Fisica d'oggi, filosofia di domani, Libreria ed. milanese, Milan, 1910.
- Scienza e poesia, edited by Jolanda de Blasi with preface by Benito Mussolini, Florence, 1934.

== Sources ==
- Dragoni, Giorgio; Bergia, Silvio; Gottardi, Giovanni (October 1999). Dizionario biografico degli scienziati e dei tecnici. Bologna: Zanichelli.
- Mille anni di scienza in Italia. Ministero dell’Università e della Ricerca Scientifica e Tecnologica, 2001.

Preceded by Pier Francesco Serragli	Mayor of Florence; 1920–1926	Succeeded by Antonio Garbasso (podestà)
Preceded by Antonio Garbasso (mayor)	Podestà of Florence; 1926–1928	Succeeded by Giuseppe Della Gherardesca
