= Rita Brunetti =

Italian physicist (1890–1942

Rita Brunetti (23 June 1890 – 28 June 1942) was an Italian physicist who became known for her research into spectroscopy and radioactivity. She was the director of the Cagliari Institute of Physics and later, the Alessandro Volta Institute of Physics in Pavia.

== Biography ==
Brunetti was born on 23 June 1890 in Milan to Gaetano and Edvige Longhi and obtained her classical diploma at the GC Beccaria high school in 1908. The next year, with the aid of a scholarship, she enrolled in pure mathematics courses at the Scuola Normale Superiore in Pisa. She soon switched her curriculum to study physics and graduated in 1913.

After she finished school, she received the Lavagna Prize, which allowed her to complete an additional year of advanced training in mathematical physics, during which time she studied gas discharge using applied spectroscopy. Her teachers included the physicists, Augusto Raffaele Occhialini, Angelo Battelli and Antonio Garbasso, who would become influential in her use of spectroscopy.

=== Career ===
In 1915, Brunetti was appointed an assistant professor of experimental physics at the Instituto di Studi Superiore di Firenze, located in Arcetri, where she received direction from Garbasso in her spectroscopy studies. (She also attended courses with Enrico Persico, Enrico Fermi and Franco Rasetti.) Brunetti then followed Garbasso to the Arcetri Astronomical Observatory, where her mentor had moved his research. There, she met Antonino Lo Surdo, who, in 1914 (at the same time as Johannes Stark) discovered the phenomenon of spectral line splitting in an electric field.

During the first World War (1915–1918 ), she was left virtually alone in the Arcetri lab after many researchers, including Garbasso, left to serve on the Italian front lines. Brunetti took over temporary direction of the Institute while also conducting new research in spectroscopy. She took special interest in the study of the Stark-Lo Surdo effect, discovering new lines in helium (a result later recalled by Fermi in 1927), and then the little-known study of X-ray spectroscopy, developing an experimental technique using rock salt plates. This work earned her the Quintino Sella Prize from the Accademia dei Lincei in 1917.

=== Post-war years ===
In 1923, she obtained a teaching qualification in experimental physics as the "first woman in post-unification Italy to win a competitive exam for a chair of physics." Her official title was Professor of Experimental Physics at the University of Ferrara. At the Ferrara Institute of Physics and the adjoining Meteorological Observatory, she directed renovations and modernizations. When Brunetti moved to the Institute of Physics in Cagliari in 1928, she began similar modernizations and met a physicist who would become her longtime collaborator and companion Zaira Ollano.

In 1929, she published novel research in a paper titled "Theory of paramagnetism for ions subject to strong molecular action," which attracted much attention from the international community of physicists, including the Englishman Edmund Clifton Stoner and the French researcher Jean Becquerel. Although Stoner and Brunetti reached the same conclusions, albeit by different paths, it was Stoner who was later credited as the researcher who most influenced American John van Vleck and his theory of magnetism, for which Van Vleck would receive the Nobel Prize in Physics in 1977. Brunetti objected at the time to the lack of credit for her work but remained overlooked.

While at Cagliari, Brunetti received significant recognition because of her appointment to the Physics Committee of the National Research Council in 1934. Beginning at that time until 1940, "the Committee paid particular attention to Brunetti's research on radioactivity, providing her with a grant of approximately 50,000 lire."

Her final career move took her to the "Volta" Physics Institute, University of Pavia, where, beginning in 1936, she held the chair of physics. In her final years of research, she studied cosmic rays, specifically the subatomic particle called the meson, using her cutting-edge emulsion technique, which was well suited to detecting the tracks of fast particles that moved across photographic plates. Her research inspired her to take numerous trips to France, Germany and England, sparking additional studies on radioactivity, cosmic rays and fast particles.

Brunetti's achievements were summarized by Sesti this way.

"Over the years, Brunetti expanded her scientific interests: she studied Curie's law, was among the first in Italy to investigate the Raman effect, and also approached physics applied to medicine and biology, as well as the study of cosmic rays."

Rita Brunetti died suddenly in Pavia at 52, on 28 June 1942. One source suggests that her death resulted "likely from professional causes."

== Selected memberships ==
- Member of the Italian Physical Society (from 1926)
- Corresponding member of the Academy of Physical Sciences of the Bologna Institute (since 1927)
- Member for physics of the National Research Council (in 1934)
- Corresponding member of the Lombard Institute of Sciences and Letters (in 1938)
