= CSCO =

CSCO may refer to:

- Colorado Springs
- the NASDAQ ticker symbol for Cisco Systems
- Complete set of commuting observables
- the publication series Corpus Scriptorum Christianorum Orientalium
