= EFNMR =

EFNMR may refer to:

- Earth's field NMR
- Electric field NMR
