= Zaira Ollano =

Italian physicist (1904–1997)

- Born: 4 March 1904; Cagliari, Italy
- Died: 2 March 1997 (aged 92); Pavia, Italy
- Education: University of Cagliari
- Occupation: Physicist

Zaira Ollano (1904–1997) was an Italian physicist, researcher and professor. She investigated physics and nuclear physics, including the radiation absorption properties of beryllium.

== Life and work ==
Ollano was born in Cagliari, the capital of Sardinia, Italy, on 4 March 1904, to Francesco and Felicina Statzu (or Stazu).

=== Cagliari ===
She graduated in physics at the University of Cagliari in 1926, and remained there as an assistant in experimental physics until 1936. When the department chair died in 1928, physicist Rita Brunetti assumed that position and for many years, Ollano and Brunetti collaborated to advance concepts in physics.

In 1929, Brunetti and Ollano developed an experiment to verify, for the first time, the Stark-Lo Surdo effect on a solid compound, determining the order of magnitude of the intramolecular electric field in didymium compounds.

Also in 1929, the two physicists began investigating Raman scattering, which had been discovered only in the previous year. In 1931, they directed their attention to nuclear physics. Ollano published research papers on their work in journals including Zeitschrift für Physik and Nature that "became popular at an international level."

In 1933, Ollano carried out a series of experiments relating to the radiation absorption properties of beryllium, for which she enlisted the help of physicist Franco Rasetti, who also supplied her with the polonium preparation she used in her laboratory.

According to Giovanni Gottardi, her discoveries were significant:

Ollano's first notable research, concerning the effect of strong magnetic fields on the splitting of spectral lines (Paschen-Back effect), provided an interesting graphic rule for their immediate classification. Subsequent researches led to the experimental demonstration of the existence of the hydronium ion (H 3 O + ) in aqueous solution, obtained by molecular analysis in Raman spectroscopy (1933); the proof was published, as well in the Nuovo Cimento, also on the Zeitschrift für Physik and undoubtedly constitutes Ollano's first notable discovery, as well as an important step towards understanding the physics of water, which is still incomplete.

=== Pavia ===
In 1936, she moved to Pavia, Italy, with Brunetti who had been appointed chair of Experimental Physics at University of Pavia.

In 1939, Ollano participated in the ministerial prize for physical sciences promoted by the Royal Academy of Italy. During this period, she and Brunetti carried out studies relating to nuclear processes due the penetration of cosmic rays into photographic plates, and of the conditions "under which a meson can leave a recognizable trace on these plates." They published their results between 1941 and 1942 in Scientific Research and Reports of the Royal Lombard Institute of Sciences and Letters, but these were the last joint publications by Ollano and Brunetti, who died at age 52 on 28 June 1942.

Ollano remained at the University of Pavia after Brunetti's death and succeeded her to become the chair of experimental physics "but only by appointment;" she stayed there until 1943. In 1944, Ollano was professor of spectroscopy until 1951. Between 1950 and 1951, she was on leave at the Center de Physique Nucléaire of the Free University of Brussels. Returning to Pavia, she taught technical physics from 1951–1958 and then earth physics from 1958–1961. Finally, she assumed professorial responsibilities in experimental physics from 1958–1961.

Zaira Ollano died in Pavia on 2 March 1997.

== Select publications ==
Among her 45 academic publications, the following notable works were authored by Ollano alone or for which she was the first author.

- Über den spektroskopischen Nachweis der Existenz des Hydroxoniumions (H 3 O + ). Ramaneffekt von Überchlorsäure und Perchloraten, in Zeitschrift für Physik, LXXVII (1932), pp. 818–822
- Secondary emission from elements bombarded with neutrons, in Nature, CXXXIV (1934), p. 735
- Some observations on discharges caused by small and large energy quanta in Geiger and Müller counters, in Renderings of the seminary of the Faculty of Sciences of Cagliari, V (1935), pp. 31–37
- Activation of some elements with slow neutrons, ibid., pp. 38–41
- The production of photoneutrons from a source at Rag + Be, in Nuovo Cimento, ns, XV (1938), pp. 541–550
- Excess of neutrons from a source a (Raa + Be) surrounded by beryllium, ibid., pp. 604–608
- The conversion beta rays of the transition between the two isomeric states of neutron-activated rhodium, in Ricerca Scientici, XI (1940), 1-2, pp. 568–571
- In memory of Rita Brunetti, publ. in Nuovo Cimento, year XIX, n.8, 1942, pages 213-229
- Emission of neutrons and protons from Ne22 by the bombardment of α-particles, with RR Roy, in Nuovo Cimento, s. 9, VIII (1951), pp. 77–81
