= Albrecht Schrauf =

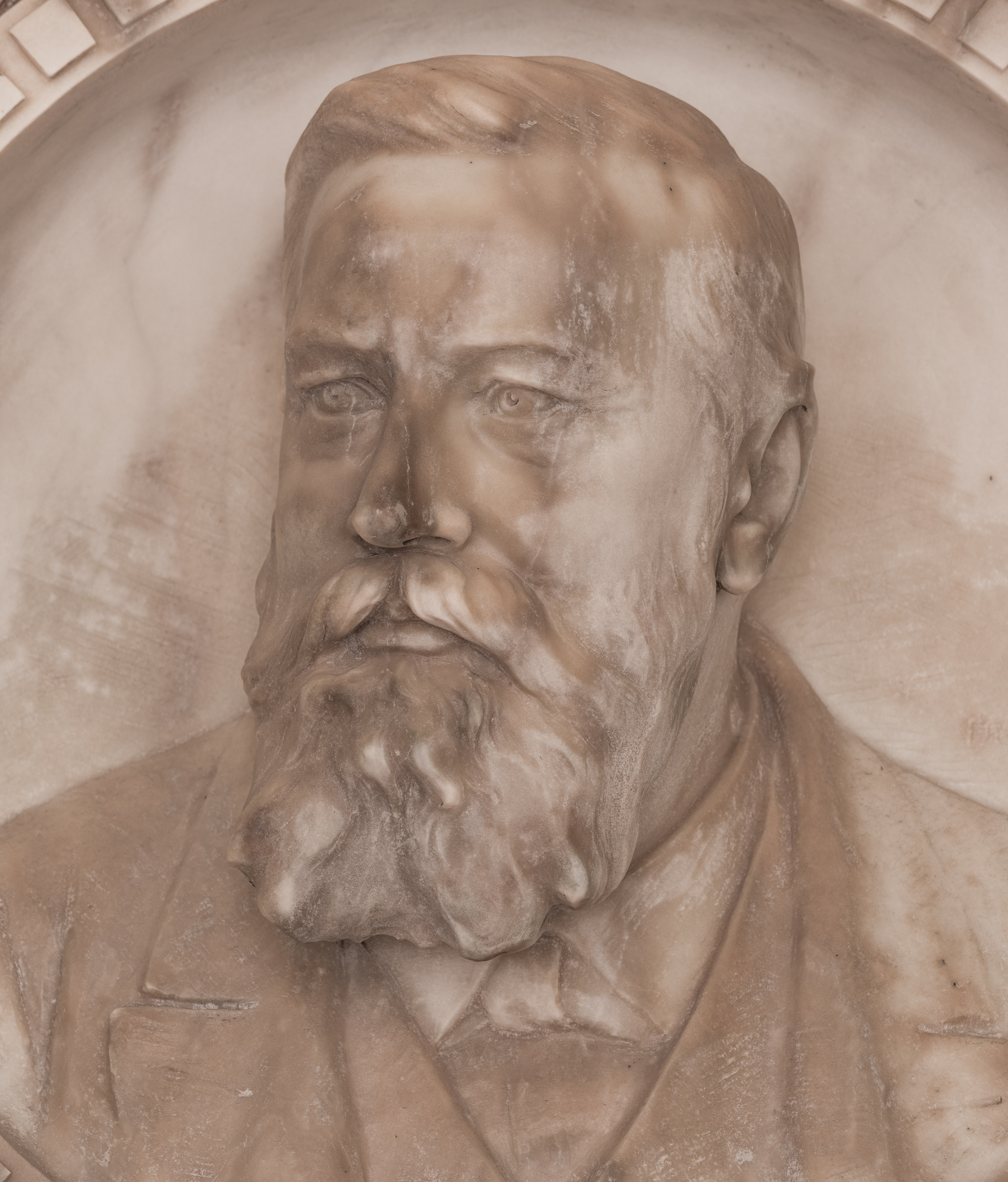
- Marble relief of Schrauf in the Arkadenhof, University of Vienna
- Born: 14 December 1837; Vienna
- Died: 29 November 1897 (aged 59); Vienna
- Education: University of Vienna
- Known for: "Atlas der Krystallformen des Mineralreiches"
- Scientific career
- Fields: Mineralogy and crystallography
- Institutions: University of Vienna
- Academic advisors: Wilhelm Josef Grailich

Albrecht Schrauf (14 December 1837, Vienna – 29 November 1897, Vienna) was an Austrian mineralogist and crystallographer.

== Biography ==
Schrauf studied mathematics, physics and mineralogy at the University of Vienna, where one of his instructors was Wilhelm Josef Grailich. Several years later, he became "custos-adjunct" at the "Imperial Hofmineralien Cabinet" in Vienna. In 1867 he was named first curator of the mineral cabinet, and in 1874 was appointed professor and director of the mineralogical museum at the University of Vienna.

Known for his investigations in the field of crystallography, he was a proponent of the crystallographic index developed by William Hallowes Miller. In the mid-1860s, he published his best works, "Atlas der Krystallformen des Mineralreiches" and an award-winning textbook titled "Lehrbuch der physikalischen Mineralogie". In Vienna, he collaborated with Gustav Tschermak in publication of the journal "Mineralogische Mitteilungen". A rare mineral known as albrechtschraufite is named in his honor.

In 1896 Schrauf lost sight in his left eye due to sudden exposure of sunlight in the course of performing crystallographic measurements.

== Principal works ==
- Atlas der krystall-formen des mineralreiches, 1865 - Atlas of crystal forms.
- Lehrbuch der physikalischen Mineralogie, 1866 - Textbook of physical mineralogy.
- Physikalische Studien. Die gesetzmässigen Beziehungen von Materie und licht, mit specieller Berucksichtigung der Molecular-constitution organischer Reihen und Krystallisirter Körper, 1867 - Physics studies. the lawful relationships of matter and light, etc.
- Handbuch der Edelsteinkunde, 1869 - Handbook of gemstone types.

== See also ==
- Physical crystallography before X-rays
