= Ciccone =

Ciccone is a family name of Italian origin and may refer to:

== People with the surname ==
- Angelo Ciccone (born 1980), Italian cyclist
- Anna Maria Ciccone (1892–1965), Italian physicist
- Anthony "Sonny" Ciccone (born 1934), New York mobster
- Ben Ciccone (1909–1990), American football player
- Christopher Ciccone (1960–2024), American artist, interior decorator, and designer
- Diego Ciccone (born 1987), Swiss footballer
- Don Ciccone (1946–2016), American musician
- Enrico Ciccone (born 1970), former ice hockey player
- Frank Ciccone (born 1947), American politician
- Giulio Ciccone (born 1994), Italian racing cyclist
- James Ciccone (born 1960), American character actor
- Madonna Louise Ciccone (born 1958), American singer known mononymously as Madonna
- Nicola Ciccone, Canadian singer
- Nicola Ciccone (footballer) (born 1996), Italian football player
- Raff Ciccone (born 1983), Australian politician
- Valerio Ciccone (born 1970), Australian artist

== Fictional characters ==
- Janet Ciccone, a character on the daytime soap opera As The World Turns
- Liberty Ciccone, a character on the daytime soap opera As The World Turns

== Other uses ==
- Ciccone (band), a London-based indie band
- Ciccone, Northern Territory, a suburb of Alice Springs, Australia
- Ciclone-class torpedo boat

== See also ==
- Cicones, a Homeric Thracian tribe
