= Orazio Bacci =

Italian politician (1864–1917)

Orazio Bacci (18 October 1864 in Castelfiorentino – 25 December 1917 in Rome) was an Italian Liberal Party politician who was the 12th mayor of Florence at the time of the Kingdom of Italy.

== Works ==
- O. Bacci (pubblicate per cura di), Ninne-nanne cantilene canzoni di giuochi e filastrocche che si dicono in Valdelsa, Firenze, Loesher & Seeber, 1891;
- O. Bacci, Un nuovo testo dei "Sonetti dei Mesi" di Folgore da S.Gemignano e un "Cantare dell'abbandonata da Siena" nel codice riccardiano 1158, Estratto dalla «Miscellanea storica della Valdelsa» (Anno V, fasc. 2 - Della serie, n. 13) - Castelfiorentino. Tip. Giovannelli e Carpitelli;
- O. Bacci, Inventario degli oggetti lasciati da S. Bernardino da Siena, Nozze Del Lungo-Sani, IV agosto MDCCCXCV, Castelfiorenino, Tipografia Giovannelli e Carpitelli;
- O. Bacci, Prosa e prosatori. Scritti storici e teorici, Milano-Palermo-Napoli, Sandron Editore, s. d. (ma 1907).

== Bibliography ==
- A. Frattini, in Dizionario Biografico degli Italiani, vol. V, Roma, Istituto della Enciclopedia Italiana, 1963, voce Bacci, Orazio.
- E. Esposito, in Enciclopedia Dantesca, vol. I, Roma, Istituto della enciclopedia Italiana, 1996 (in tiratura limitata a 2499 esemplari), voce "Bacci, Orazio".
- G.Levantini-Pieroni, Nelle nozze Del Lungo-Bacci, Il Dottore Angiolo Del Lungo, Firenze, Le Monnier, 1895 [strenna di nozze]
- Romilda Del Lungo, in Prefazionde a Orazio Bacci, La lampada della vita, Firenze, Bemporad [opera postuma], 1920.
- Abba Luzzatto Fegiz, Dizionario Generale degli Autori Italiani contemporanei, vol. 1, Firenze, Vallecchi, 1974, voce Orazio Bacci.
- S. Gensini, Orazio Bacci: la sua Società e la sua rivista, in Orazio Bacci. Un letterato vadelsano, Convegno di studio (Firenze-Castelfiorentino, 6-7 novembre 1987), «MSV», XCV (1989), 1-2 pp. 43–82.
- A. Marsini, Orazio Bacci: «Dal suo carteggio», ivi, pp. 37–41.
- M. Raicich, L'Officina del Manuale, ivi, pp. 93–123.
- M. Marchi, Orazio Bacci e la prosa, ivi, pp. 157–165.

Preceded by Filippo Corsini	Mayor of Florence; 1915–1917	Succeeded by Pier Francesco Serragli
