= Viktor von Lang =

Austrian chemist (1838–1921)

- Born: 2 March 1838; Vienna, Austrian Empire
- Died: 3 July 1921 (aged 83); Vienna, Austria
- Education: University of Gießen
- Scientific career
- Fields: Theoretical chemistry
- Workplaces: University of Vienna
- Thesis: Physikalische Verhältnisse kristallisierter Körper (1859)
- Academic advisors: Andreas von Ettingshausen
- Doctoral students: Franz S. Exner

Viktor von Lang (2 March 1838 – 3 July 1921) was an Austrian chemist. He is counted among the pioneers and founders of crystal physics.

== Career ==
Lang earned his doctorate from the University of Giessen in 1859 with a thesis titled "Physikalische Verhältnisse kristallisierter Körper".

From 1865 to 1909, Lang served as director of the Physikalisches Kabinett in Vienna. His book on introductory theoretical physics, Einleitung in die theoretische physik, was published in eight editions from 1867 to 1891. With crystallographer Wilhelm Josef Grailich, he was co-author of Untersuchungen über die Physikalischen Verhältnisse Krystallisirter Körper ("Investigations into the physical conditions of crystallized bodies").

The mineral langite was named in his honor by Nevil Story Maskelyne.
