= Pier Francesco Serragli =

Italian politician (died 1938)

Pier Francesco Serragli (19th century – 1938) was an Italian Liberal Party politician and lawyer. He was the 13th mayor of Florence at the time of the Kingdom of Italy.

== Works ==
- Un contratto agrario. La mezzadria toscana, Firenze, Libreria Fiorentina, 1908.
- Le agitazioni dei contadini in Toscana, Relazione al Congresso agrario Nazionale, Roma-febbraio 1921.

Preceded by Orazio Bacci	Mayor of Florence; 1918–1919	Succeeded by Antonio Garbasso
