= Giuseppe della Gherardesca =

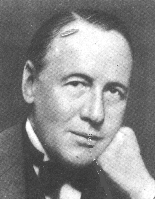

Senator of the Kingdom of Italy
- In office 1929–1943

Podestà of Florence
- In office 22 September 1928 – 12 December 1933
- Preceded by: Antonio Garbasso
- Succeeded by: Paolo Venerosi Pesciolini

Personal details
- Born: Giuseppe Maria della Gherardesca; 20 February 1876 Florence, Kingdom of Italy
- Died: 2 November 1968 (aged 92) Florence, Italy
- Party: National Fascist Party
- Occupation: Landowner, industrial manager

Giuseppe Maria della Gherardesca (20 February 1876 – 2 November 1968) was an Italian aristocrat and Fascist politician who served as podestà of Florence and as a senator of the Kingdom of Italy. He was also president of FILA.
