= Francesco Rossetti =

Italian experimental physicist (1833-1885)

Francesco Rosetti
- Born: September 14, 1833; Trent, Austrian Empire
- Died: April 20, 1885 (aged 51); Padua, Italy
- Education: University of Padua; University of Vienna
- Scientific career
- Fields: Experimental physics
- Workplaces: University of Padua
- Academic advisors: Andreas von Ettingshausen; Victor Regnault
- Notable students: Andrea Naccari

Francesco Rossetti (Trento, 14 September 1833 – Padua, 20 April 1885) was an Italian experimental physicist.

== Biography ==
Son of Giovanni Battista, Rossetti started his education in his natal town, Trento. He then attended the University of Padova and, from 1854 to 1857, the University of Vienna, where he took classes in mathematics, chemistry and physics, and graduated in physics and mathematics. His advisor was Andreas von Ettingshausen. Among his fellow students there were Josef Stefan (future supervisor of Ludwig Boltzmann) and Ernst Mach.

In 1857, he became a teacher at the Liceo di Santa Caterina in Venice. In 1860, he was hired by the University of Padova. Having obtained a year's leave from the Austrian government, he spent 1864 in Paris working in the laboratory of the physicist and chemist Henri-Victor Regnault. In 1866, he became extraordinary professor and in 1880 full professor of experimental physics at the University of Padova. He was the dean of the faculty of science from 1876 to 1885. He was a member of the National Academy of Sciences from 1879, of the National Lincei Academy from 1882, and of other important Italian and international scientific academies and societies.

His scientific activity mainly concerned electrostatics, electrochemistry, and thermometry of flames. He published 42 papers. In 1862, he was the doctoral advisor of Andrea Naccari.

== Main works by Rossetti ==
- Sull'uso delle coppie termoelettriche nella misura delle temperature 1867.
- Sul maximum di densità e sulla dilatazione dell'acqua distillata, dell'acqua dell'Adriatico e di alcune soluzioni saline 1868.
- Sul magnetismo 1871.
- Uso della macchina di Holtz in alcune ricerche elettrometriche sui condensatori elettrici 1872.
- Sul potere specifico induttivo dei coibenti 1873.
- Nuovi studii sulle correnti delle macchine elettriche 1874.
- Sulla quantita di lavoro che viene utilizzato nello elettromotore di Holtz 1874.
- Indagini sperimentali sulla temperatura del sole 1878.
- Sul potere assorbente, sul potere emissivo termico delle fiamme e sulla temperatura dell'arco voltaico 1878.
