= Paolo Venerosi Pesciolini =

Podestà of Florence
- In office 12 December 1933 – 8 August 1943
- Preceded by: Giuseppe della Gherardesca
- Succeeded by: Giotto Dainelli Dolfi

Member of the Chamber of Fasces and Corporations
- In office 1939–1943

Personal details
- Born: 27 January 1896 Florence, Kingdom of Italy
- Died: 10 November 1964 (aged 68) Londa, Province of Florence, Italy
- Party: National Fascist Party
- Occupation: Landowner

Paolo Venerosi Pesciolini (27 January 1896 – 10 November 1964) was an Italian landowner and Fascist politician. He served as podestà of Florence from 1933 until the fall of the Fascist regime in 1943.

== Life and career ==
A member of a Florentine aristocratic landowning family, he joined the National Fascist Party in 1920. He served as podestà in Londa and San Godenzo.

In 1933 he was appointed podestà of Florence, a position he held until 25 July 1943.

During his tenure, Florence hosted Adolf Hitler's official visit in 1938 and saw the dismissal of Eugenio Montale from the Gabinetto Vieusseux in the same year.

He also served as a member of the Chamber of Fasces and Corporations from 1939 to 1943.
