= Andreas von Ettingshausen =

Austrian mathematician and physicist (1796–1878)

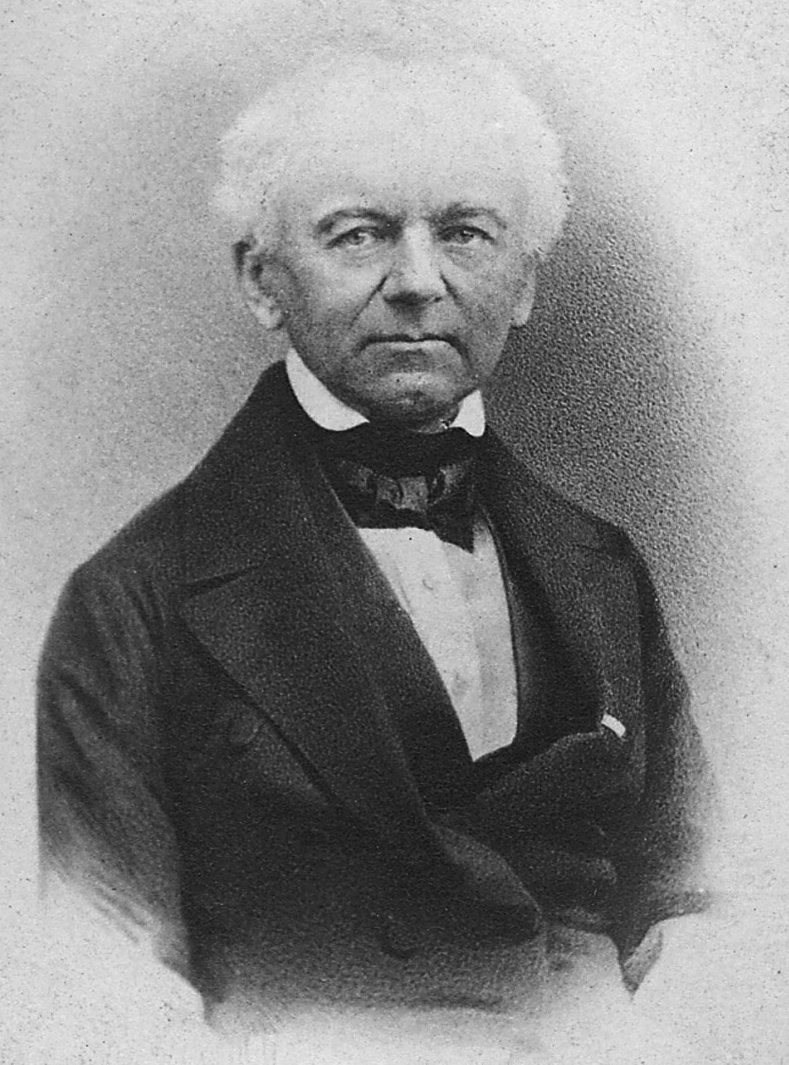
- Born: 25 November 1796; Heidelberg, Electorate of the Palatinate
- Died: 25 May 1878 (aged 81); Vienna, Austria-Hungary
- Education: University of Vienna
- Known for: Electric machines
- Children: Carolina Augusta von Ettingshausen, grandmother of Rudolf Allers
- Scientific career
- Fields: Physicist and mathematician
- Workplaces: University of Innsbruck; University of Vienna; Vienna Polytechnic Institute
- Academic advisors: Ignaz Lindner
- Doctoral students: Ernst Mach; Francesco Rossetti; Jožef Stefan; Viktor von Lang

Andreas Freiherr von Ettingshausen (25 November 1796 – 25 May 1878) was an Austrian mathematician and physicist.

Ettingshausen studied philosophy and jurisprudence at the University of Vienna. In 1817, he joined the University of Vienna and taught mathematics and physics as an adjunct professor. In 1819, he became professor of physics at the University of Innsbruck and 1821 professor of higher mathematics at the University of Vienna. His lectures of that time marked a new era for the University of Vienna, and they were published in 1827 in two volumes. In 1834 Ettingshausen became the chair of physics.

Ettingshausen was the first to design an electromagnetic machine, which used the electrical induction for power generation. He promoted optics and wrote a textbook of physics. His method of lecturing was widely influential. In addition he wrote a book on combinatorial analysis (Vienna 1826). In 1866, he retired.

Among his lasting impacts in mathematics is the introduction of the notation $\binom{n}{k}$ for the binomial coefficient, which is the coefficient of $x^k$ in the expansion of the binomial $(1+x)^k$ and, more generally, the number of $k$-element subsets of an $n$-element set. One of his students was Gregor Mendel, who used combinatorial analysis in his theory of inheritance.

His daughter Carolina Augusta von Ettingshausen was the grandmother of Rudolf Allers.
