= Wilhelm Josef Grailich =

Austrian physicist, mineralogist and crystallographer

Wilhelm Joseph Grailich (16 February 1829, in Pressburg – 13 September 1859, in Vienna) was an Austrian physicist, mineralogist and crystallographer.

== Education ==
From 1847, Grailich studied sciences at the polytechnic institute in Vienna.

== Career ==
Grailich served as an assistant to Andreas von Ettingshausen in the institute of physics at the University of Vienna. In 1856 he became an assistant at the Hofmineraliencabinett, where soon afterwards, he succeeded Gustav Adolf Kenngott as "kustos-adjunkt". In 1857 he became an associate professor of higher physics at the university, and in 1859, was chosen as a member of the Vienna Academy of Sciences. In 1910, a thoroughfare in the Landstrasse district of Vienna was named Grailichgasse in his honor.

Known for his work in crystal optics and crystal physics, he was the author of numerous scientific papers in the field of crystallography. In 1856, he translated William Hallowes Miller's textbook of crystallography into German as "Lehrbuch der Kristallographie". He explained the phenomenon of fluorescence in crystals, and is credited for making improvements to Wheatstone's vibration apparatus (in German: "Schwingungsapparat").

== Personal life ==
His full name was Andreas Wilhelm Joseph Grailich, he was son of Friedrich Joseph Grailich (teacher in the Lutheran School in Pressburg) and Carolina Neidherr. His grandfather was Andreas Grailich.

On September 30, 1859, Grailich died in Vienna at the age of 30.

His wife was Carolina Augusta von Ettingshausen, daughter of Andreas von Ettingshausen. His daughter was Auguste Grailich, mother of Rudolf Allers.

== Selected works ==
- Untersuchungen über den Ein- und Zweiaxigen Glimmer, 1853 - Studies on uniaxial and biaxial mica.
- Das Sklerometer, ein Apparat zur genaueren Messung der Harte der Krystalle, 1854 - (with F Pekárek) - The sclerometer, an instrument for accurate measurement of the hardness of crystals.
- Untersuchungen über die physikalische Verhältnisse krystallisirter Körper, 1858 (with Viktor von Lang) - Studies on the physical conditions of crystallized bodies.
- Der Römerit, ein neues Mineral aus dem Rammelsberge, nebst Bemerkungen über die Bleiglätte, 1858 - Romerite, a new mineral from the Rammelsberg.
- Krystallographisch-optische Untersuchungen, 1858 - Crystallographic-optical studies.
