= Filippo Corsini =

Italian politician

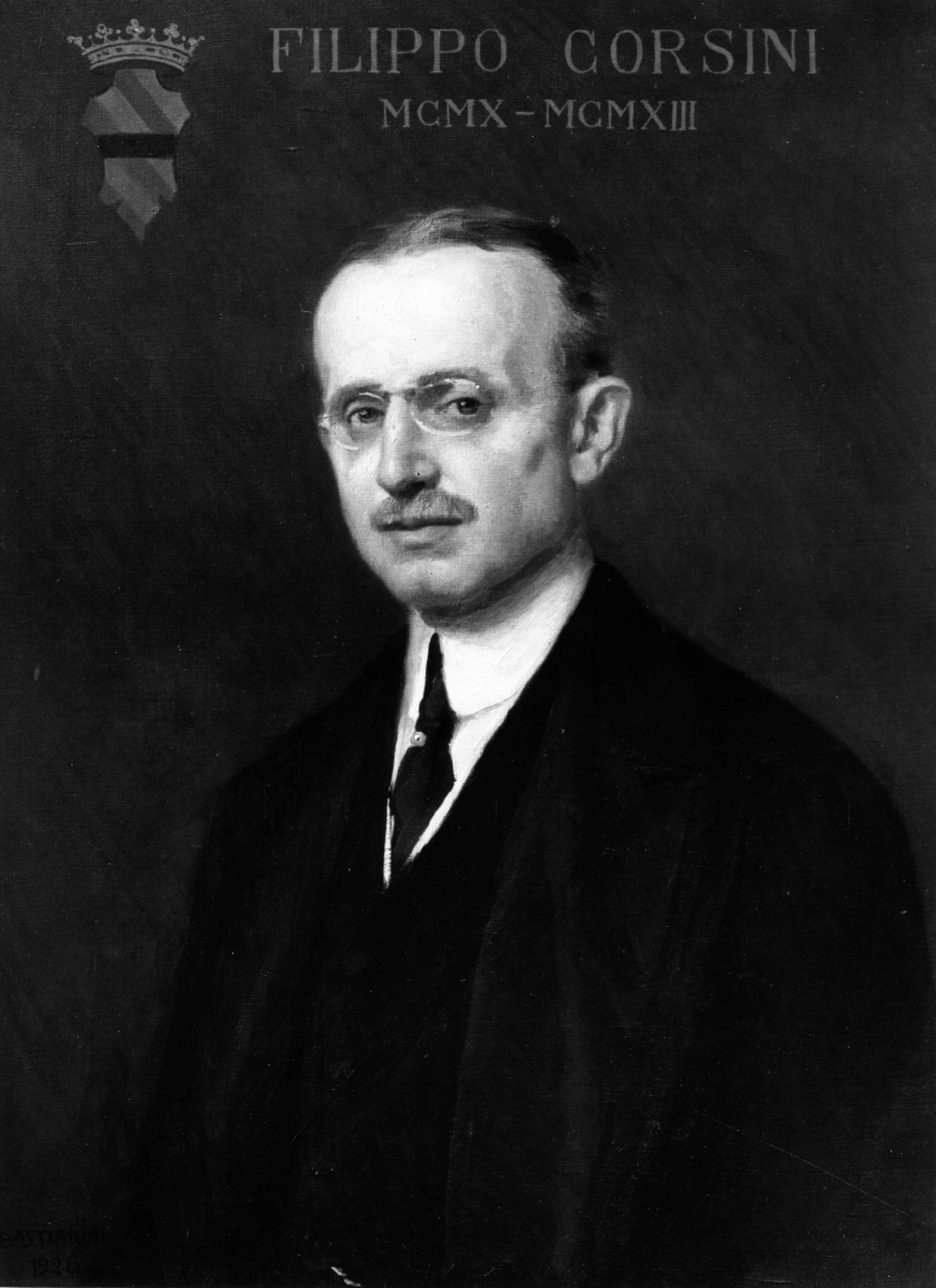

Mayor of Florence
- In office 1910–1915
- Preceded by: Giulio Chiarugi
- Succeeded by: Orazio Bacci

Personal details
- Born: 1873
- Died: 1926 (aged 52–53)
- Political party: Italian Liberal Party

Filippo Corsini (1873–1926) was an Italian Liberal Party politician. He was Marquess of Lajatico, Province of Pisa, Tuscany. He was the 11th mayor of Florence at the time of the Kingdom of Italy.
