= Albrechtschraufite =

General
- Category: Minerals
- Formula: Ca_{4}Mg(UO_{2})_{2}(CO_{3})_{6}F_{2}·17H_{2}O
- IMA symbol: Asf
- Crystal system: Triclinic

Identification
- Formula mass: 1,428.98 g
- Color: Yellow green
- Cleavage: None
- Fracture: Conchoidal
- Mohs scale hardness: 2–3
- Luster: Vitreous
- Density: 2.6 g/cm3
- Optical properties: Biaxial (−)
- Other characteristics: Radioactive

Albrechtschraufite (IMA symbol: Asf) is a very rare complex hydrated calcium and magnesium-bearing uranyl fluoride carbonate mineral with formula Ca_{4}Mg(UO_{2})_{2}(CO_{3})_{6}F_{2}·17H_{2}O. Its molar weight is 1,428.98 g, color yellow-green, streak white, density 2.6 g/cm^{3}, Mohs hardness 2–3, and luster is vitreous (glassy). It is named after Albrecht Schrauf (1837–1897), Professor of Mineralogy, University of Vienna. Its type locality is Jáchymov, Jáchymov District, Krušné Hory Mountains, Karlovy Vary Region, Bohemia, Czech Republic.

== See also ==
- List of minerals
- List of minerals named after people
