= Electric field NMR =

Electric field NMR (EFNMR) spectroscopy is the NMR spectroscopy where additional information on a sample being probed is obtained from the effect of a strong, externally applied, electric field on the NMR signal.

== See also ==
- NMR spectroscopy
- Stark effect
