= Anna Maria Ciccone =

Italian physicist

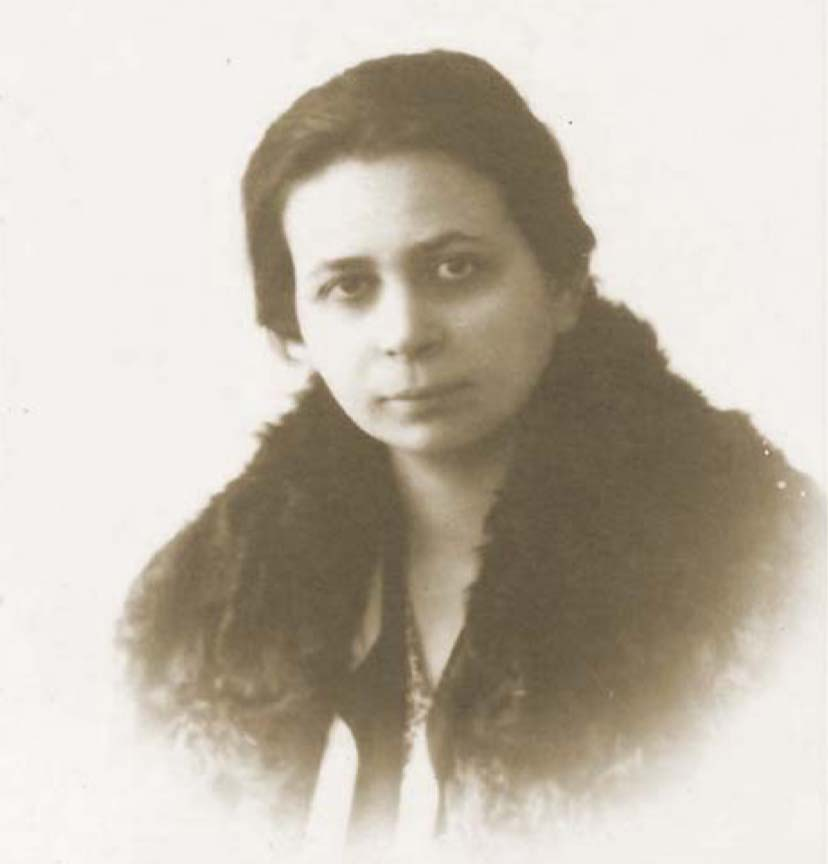
- Anna Maria Ciccone (1891–1965)
- Born: 29 August 1892; Noto, Italy
- Died: 29 March 1965 (aged 72); Noto, Italy
- Citizenship: Italian
- Education: University of Pisa; Sapienza University of Rome
- Known for: studies in spectroscopy
- Scientific career
- Fields: Physicist
- Workplaces: University of Pisa; Centre national de la recherche scientifique (Paris); Curie Institute (Paris)
- Doctoral advisor: Luigi Puccianti
- Other academic advisors: Gerhard Herzberg

Anna Maria Ciccone, or Mariannina Corradina Ciccone, was an Italian physicist.

== From Sicily to Pisa ==
Maria Anna or Mariannina Corradina Ciccone was born on 29 August 1892 (or 1891 according to different documents) in Noto, Sicily, of Corrado, a rich trader, and Caterina Mirmina. She got her diploma from Regia Scuola Normale (which will later become known as Istituto Magistrale) in 1910. Since her diploma did not allow her to attend specific faculties, Mariannina signed up at the Istituto Tecnico Archimede in the third year, in Modica, in a Physics-Mathematics class where she was the only female student in the class. After the first year in the Maths faculty at Rome university, she moved to Pisa, where she graduated with high marks, and where she got a second degree in physics in 1924. The following year she was appointed assistant professor at the University of Pisa Physics Institute, then she became Full Assistant and from 1931 Co-Assistant, on the proposal of the principal of Luigi Puccianti's Physics Institute.

In 1936 she became adjunct professor in Experimental Physics. In the same year she started a period at the Darmstadt’s Physics Institute in the Engineering school of Darmstadt in Germany, cooperating in spectroscopy research with her teacher Gerhard Herzberg, an anti-Nazi scientist and future Chemistry Nobel Prize winner in 1971. Her teaching career highlights her full dedication to work. Her activity was entirely focused on her scientific studies in the Physics Institute, so that she even moved her residence to the same building. She started publishing her first papers in Il Nuovo Cimento and in Memorie della società toscana di Scienze Naturali: two articles which would lead to more complex texts in the future.

In 1939 she obtained the chair of spectroscopy that she maintained until retirement; between 1943 and 1948 she kept on the active teaching of physics and of maths since she was the only teacher to remain in service.

== The German attack to the University ==
Ciccone, one of the first women graduated in maths and physics from Pisa university, deputy manager of the institute, dared to face German troops, then occupying Italy (Operation Achse), hence avoiding the total destruction of the building and the total removal of the instruments and the library.

Between the end of June and the beginning of July 1944, a wing of the already plundered and mined building of the Institute of Physics situated in Piazza Torricelli was blown up by German soldiers. Professor Ciccone did not leave the institute for the whole period of the war and kept on giving lessons (the only teacher after 8 September 1943). She faced the officers – she knew German language well since she had worked in Darmstadt - confirming with extreme bravery that she would abandon her workplace for no reason, even at the risk of being blown up with the building.

In front of her resolute attitude, the German officers gave up on their intent and this prevented the building and its scientific instruments from being destroyed. Both for her courageous permanence in the institute and for the courage shown against the Germans, Mariannina Ciccone was praised by the Faculty Council, and by the dean Remo De Fazi and Luigi Russo, a famous Professor of Italian studies that became dean immediately after liberation. In the draft of a letter sent to the Ministry of Education on 7 June 1946, Dean Luigi Russo said: "I can’t help but report the merit gained by professor Ciccone during the period of the German siege concerning the preservation of scientific materials and for being always vigilant in her Institute, even when keeping safe from danger would have meant running away from it".

== After the War ==
On 1 November 1953 she was relocated to the department of Physics-Chemistry to continue her research on infrared rays spectroscopy. It is plausible that her relocation was the result of precise administrative choices aiming to hire other teachers in the Physics Institute. This hypothesis is confirmed by the fact that she had to face organizational problems in the new headquarters: none of the instruments required by Mariannina Ciccone for her job was available so she was asked to leave her activity.

She resigned on 12 October 1954 but, even if retired, she kept on teaching as an external lecturer, in particular as a physics teacher at the Science and Spectroscopy, Experimental Physics, Terrestrial Physics and Atomic Physics Faculty. At the end of the academic years 1961–62, she was officially relieved of duty so she went back to Noto where she died on 29 March 1965.

== Legacy ==
Although she was born in the 19th century in a city in the south, Noto, she decided to study and teach physics in Pisa, a very important international city. She tested new research methods modifying experimental equipment and preparing new observational techniques in the fields of spectroscopy and electromagnetism. In that period, the first half of 20th century, Pisa university was the core of relevant discoveries in modern physics. They were so significant that all the traditional concepts of space and time were undermined. This experience gave her the opportunity to meet important people like Polvani, Racaah, Fermi, Ronchi, Salvini.

The discovery and enhancement the physicist from Noto is really recent and has been promoted by Prof. Marco Piccolino and his research in Tuscany about Nazi massacres that occurred in 1944. During his research he found out about Mariannina Ciccone's resistance against the Nazis. Prof Corrado Spataro's study has contributed to shed light on the scientist who left Noto for Pisa's Normale and devoted her soul and body to spectroscopy and light studies. Spataro writes: "it was important, appropriate and satisfying (...). meeting and studying Mariannina Ciccone in 2015 which was the 50th anniversary of her death and dedicated by UN to the "light", whose most secret components she tried to understand through the use of her spectroscope."

== Works ==
- Spettroscopia, GUF, Pisa, 1941.
- Lezioni di spettroscopia, F. Vallerini Editore, Pisa, 1947.
- Introduzione allo studio della fisica atomica e molecolare, F. Vallerini Editore, Pisa, 1953.
- Elementi di fisica per i licei scientifici, A. Signorelli, Roma, 1964.

== Bibliography ==
- (in Italian) Atti del Convegno in ricordo di Mariannina Ciccone, Noto (SR), 13-15 novembre 2015, a cura di C. Spataro, Patrocinato da: Comune di Noto, FIDAPA-BPW Italy e Consorzio Universitario Mediterraneo Orientale, Effe Grafica Fratantonio, Pachino (SR), 2016.
