= Rudolf Allers =

Austrian psychiatrist (1883–1963)

- Born: 13 January 1883; Vienna, Austrian Empire
- Died: 18 December 1963 (aged 80); Washington, U.S.
- Education: University of Vienna; Catholic University of America; Georgetown University
- Scientific career
- Fields: Psychiatry

Rudolf Allers (13 January 1883, Vienna, Austria-Hungary – 18 December 1963, Washington, US) was an Austrian-American psychiatrist and academic.

== Life and career ==
Rudolf Allers was born in Vienna on January 13, 1883. He was the son of a doctor, Mark Allers (1837–1894, originally of Jewish extraction) and Augusta Grailich (1858–1916, daughter of Wilhelm Josef Grailich and Carolina Augusta von Ettingshausen). In 1908, he married Carola Meitner (a sister of Lise Meitner).

Allers was the only Catholic to join the first group of the founder of psychoanalysis Sigmund Freud. Together with Alfred Adler, he later distanced himself from psychoanalysis as understood by Freud and his followers. He was later detached from the group of Adler in 1927. He taught at the University of Vienna (1919).

Allers was master of Viktor Frankl in 1925–1930, mentor of Hans Urs von Balthasar and friend of Saint Edith Stein. Both von Balthasar and Stein lived for several months in Allers' home in Vienna in 1931.

He studied the preventive method of St. John Bosco and his pedagogical applications, and at the invitation of Father Agostino Gemelli, was in Italy to study the philosophy of St. Thomas Aquinas at the Catholic University of Milan and graduated in Philosophy in 1934.

With the annexation of Austria to the Third Reich, Allers emigrated to the United States, where he taught at the Catholic University of America in Washington D.C. (1938–1948), then as professor of philosophy at Georgetown University from 1948 until his death in 1963. Allers died in 1963 and is buried in St. Mary's Cemetery in Washington, D.C.

He was a Guggenheim Fellow in 1958.

== Books ==
- Work and Play. Collected Papers on the Philosophy of Psychology (1938–1963). Edited by Alexander Batthyány, Jorge Olaechea Catter, Andrew Tallon. Marquette University Press, 2009.
- Self Improvement. Benziger Brothers, Inc., 1939. Republished by Kessinger Publishing, New York, 2010.
- The Improvement of the Self. Cluny Media LLC, 2019. Republication of Self Improvement published by Benziger Brothers in 1939.
- What’s Wrong With Freud? A Critical Study of Freudian Psychoanalysis. Roman Catholic Books, US, 1941.
- The Successful Error: A Critique of Freudian Psychoanalysis. Sheed & Ward Inc, 1940. Republished by Cluny Media LLC, 2019.
- Forming Character in Adolescents. 1940, Reprinted by Roman Catholic Books in 2006.
- Sex Psychology. Published by Roman Catholic Books.
- Über Schadelschusse: Probleme der Klinik und der Fursorge.
- In Louis Jugnet: Un psychiatre-philosophe, Rudolf Allers ou l’Anti-Freud, Paris, Cèdre, 1950. Rudolf Allers o el Anti-Freud, Madrid, Speiro, 1974. Republished in 2002 and 2021.
