= Luigi Puccianti =

Italian physicist (1875–1952)

- Born: 11 June 1875; Pisa, Italy
- Died: 9 June 1952 (aged 76); Pisa, Italy
- Education: University of Pisa
- Scientific career
- Fields: Physicist
- Doctoral advisor: Angelo Battelli
- Doctoral students: Enrico Fermi, Anna Maria Ciccone

Luigi Puccianti (Italian: [luˈiːdʒi putˈtʃanti]; 11 June 1875 – 9 June 1952) was an Italian physicist.

== Career ==
In 1899–1900, Puccianti constructed a highly sensitive spectrograph, with which he studied the infrared absorption of many compounds and attempted to correlate the spectra with molecular structure. He studied the emission spectra of metals and halogens and proposed measuring the wavelength of X-rays by using a diffraction grating at large angles of incidence.

Puccianti was, at one time, the academic advisor to Nobel Prize winner Enrico Fermi. He once said there was little he could teach Fermi, and often asked Fermi to teach him something instead.
