= Andrea Naccari =

Italian physicist and mathematician (1841–1919)

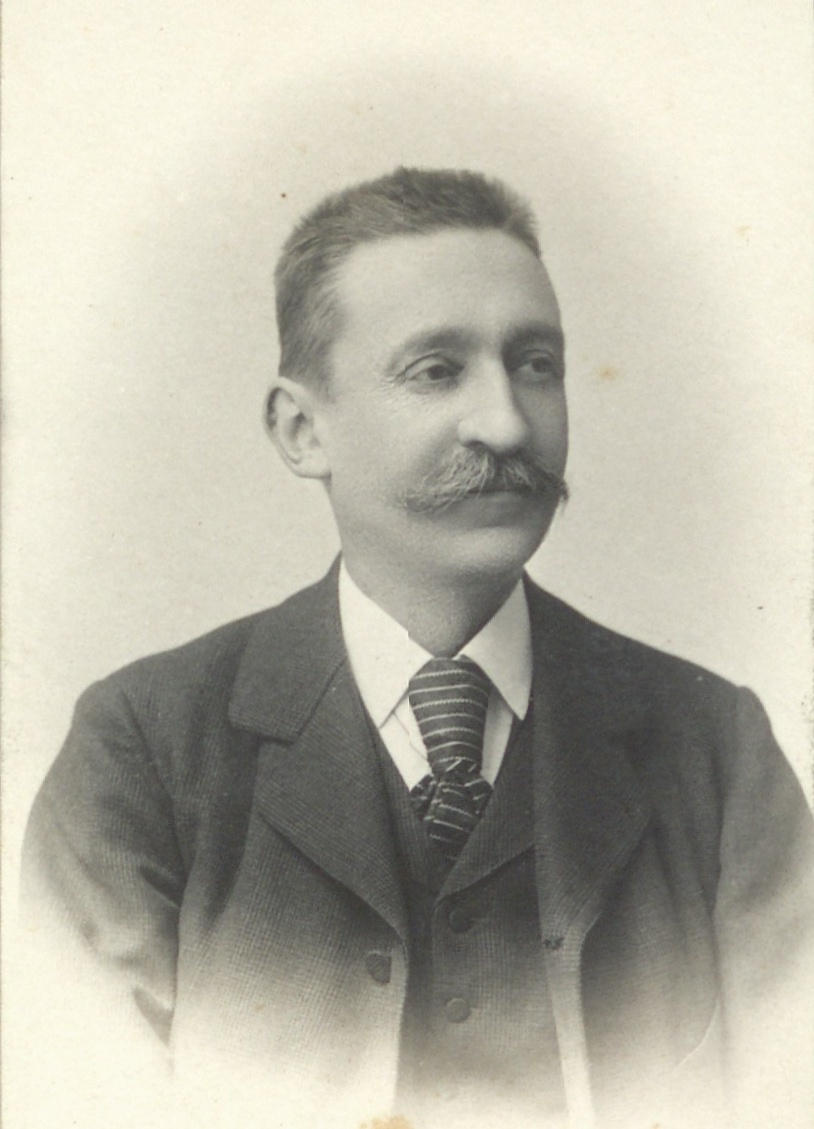
- Born: 12 August 1841; Padua
- Died: 2 October 1919 (aged 78); Turin
- Education: University of Padua
- Scientific career
- Fields: Physicist and mathematician
- Workplaces: University of Turin
- Doctoral advisor: Francesco Rossetti
- Doctoral students: Angelo Battelli

Andrea Naccari (12 August 1841 – 2 October 1919) was an Italian chemist notable for his study of the thermoelectric properties of metals, the photoelectric effect of metals immersed in liquids, and the electrical conductivity of gases and liquid dielectrics. He showed that the variation in the electrical resistance of distilled water was due largely to the solubility of the glass of the receptacle in which it was contained.

He obtained his PhD in pure maths in 1862 at the University of Padua under Francesco Rossetti.
