= Complete set of commuting observables =

Concept in quantum mechanics

In quantum mechanics, a complete set of commuting observables (CSCO) is a set of commuting operators whose common eigenvectors can be used as a basis to express any quantum state. In the case of operators with discrete spectra, a CSCO is a set of commuting observables whose simultaneous eigenspaces span the Hilbert space and are linearly independent, so that the eigenvectors are uniquely specified by the corresponding sets of eigenvalues.

In some simple cases, like bound state problems in one dimension, the energy spectrum is nondegenerate, and energy can be used to uniquely label the eigenstates. In more complicated problems, the energy spectrum is degenerate, and additional observables are needed to distinguish between the eigenstates.

Since each pair of observables in the set commutes, the observables are all compatible so that the measurement of one observable has no effect on the result of measuring another observable in the set. It is therefore not necessary to specify the order in which the different observables are measured. Measurement of the complete set of observables constitutes a complete measurement, in the sense that it projects the quantum state of the system onto a unique and known vector in the basis defined by the set of operators. That is, to prepare the completely specified state, we have to take any state arbitrarily, and then perform a succession of measurements corresponding to all the observables in the set, until it becomes a uniquely specified vector in the Hilbert space (up to a phase).

== The compatibility theorem ==
Consider two observables, $A$ and $B$, represented by the operators $\hat{A}$ and $\hat{B}$. Then the following statements are equivalent:

1. $A$ and $B$ are compatible observables.
2. $\hat{A}$ and $\hat{B}$ have a common eigenbasis.
3. The operators $\hat{A}$ and $\hat{B}$ commute, meaning that $[\hat{A}, \hat{B}] = \hat{A}\hat{B}-\hat{B}\hat{A}=0$.

=== Proofs ===
Proof that a common eigenbasis implies commutation

Let $\{|\psi_n \rangle\}$ be a set of orthonormal states (i.e., $\langle \psi_m | \psi_n \rangle = \delta^{\,}_{m,n}$) that form a complete eigenbasis for each of the two compatible observables $A$ and $B$ represented by the self-adjoint operators $\hat{A}$ and $\hat{B}$ with corresponding (real-valued) eigenvalues $\{a_n\}$ and $\{b_n\}$, respectively. This implies that

$$\hat{A}\hat{B}|\psi_n\rangle=\hat{A}b_n|\psi_n\rangle
=a_nb_n|\psi_n\rangle
=b_na_n|\psi_n\rangle
=\hat{B}\hat{A}|\psi_n\rangle ,$$

for each mutual eigenstate $|\psi_n \rangle$. Because the eigenbasis is complete, we can expand an arbitrary state $|\Psi\rangle$ according to

$$|\Psi\rangle=\sum_n c_n|\psi_n\rangle,$$

where $c_n = \langle \psi_n | \Psi \rangle$. The above results imply that

$$(\hat{A}\hat{B}-\hat{B}\hat{A})|\Psi\rangle=\sum_{n}c_n(\hat{A}\hat{B}-\hat{B}\hat{A})|\psi_n\rangle=0,$$

for any state $|\Psi\rangle$. Thus, $\hat{A}\hat{B}-\hat{B}\hat{A}=[\hat{A},\hat{B}]=0$, meaning that the two operators commute.

Proof that commuting observables possess a complete set of common eigenfunctions

When $A$ has non-degenerate eigenvalues:

Let $\{|\psi_n\rangle\}$ be a complete set of orthonormal eigenkets of the self-adjoint operator $A$ corresponding to the set of real-valued eigenvalues $\{a_n\}$. If the self-adjoint operators $A$ and $B$ commute, we can write

$$A(B|\psi_n\rangle)=BA|\psi_n\rangle=a_n(B|\psi_n\rangle)$$

So, if $B|\psi_n\rangle \neq 0$, we can say that $B|\psi_n\rangle$ is an eigenket of $A$ corresponding to the eigenvalue $a_n$. Since both $B|\psi_n\rangle$ and $|\psi_n\rangle$ are eigenkets associated with the same non-degenerate eigenvalue $a_n$, they can differ at most by a multiplicative constant. We call this constant $b_n$. So,

$$B|\psi_n\rangle=b_n|\psi_n\rangle$$,

which means $|\psi_n\rangle$ is an eigenket of $B$, and thus of $A$ and $B$ simultaneously. In the case of $B|\psi_n\rangle = 0$, the non-zero vector $|\psi_n\rangle$ is an eigenket of $B$ with the eigenvalue $b_n=0$.

When $A$ has degenerate eigenvalues:

Suppose each $a_n$ is $g$ -fold degenerate. Let the corresponding orthonormal eigenkets be $|\psi_{nr}\rangle, r \in \{1,2,\dots,g\}$. Since $[A,B]=0$, we reason as above to find that $B|\psi_{nr}\rangle$ is an eigenket of $A$ corresponding to the degenerate eigenvalue $a_n$. So, we can expand $B|\psi_{nr}\rangle$ in the basis of the degenerate eigenkets of $a_n$:

$$B|\psi_{nr}\rangle=\sum_{s=1}^g c_{rs}|\psi_{ns}\rangle$$

The $c_{rs}$ are the expansion coefficients. The coefficients $c_{rs}$ form a self-adjoint matrix, since $\langle \psi_{ns} |B|\psi_{nr}\rangle = c_{rs}$. Next step would be to diagonalize the matrix $c_{rs}$. To do so, we sum over all $r$ with $g$ constants $d_r$. So,

$$B\sum_{r=1}^gd_r|\psi_{nr}\rangle=\sum_{r=1}^g\sum_{s=1}^g d_rc_{rs}|\psi_{ns}\rangle$$

So, $\sum_{r=1}^gd_r|\psi_{nr}\rangle$ will be an eigenket of $B$ with the eigenvalue $b_n$ if we have

$$\sum_{r=1}^g d_rc_{rs}=b_nd_s, s=1,2,...g$$

This constitutes a system of $g$ linear equations for the constants $d_r$. A non-trivial solution exists if

$$\det[c_{rs}-b_n\delta_{rs}]=0$$

This is an equation of order $g$ in $b_n$, and has $g$ roots. For each root $b_n=b_n^{(k)}, k=1,2,...g$ we have a non-trivial solution $d_r$, say, $d_r^{(k)}$. Due to the self-adjoint of $c_{rs}$, all solutions are linearly independent. Therefore they form the new basis

$$|\phi_n^{(k)}\rangle=\sum_{r=1}^g d_r^{(k)}|\psi_{nr}\rangle$$

$|\phi_n^{(k)}\rangle$ is simultaneously an eigenket of $A$ and $B$ with eigenvalues $a_n$ and $b_n^{(k)}$ respectively.

=== Discussion ===
We consider the two above observables $A$ and $B$. Suppose there exists a complete set of kets $\{|\psi_n\rangle\}$ whose every element is simultaneously an eigenket of $A$ and $B$. Then we say that $A$ and $B$ are compatible. If we denote the eigenvalues of $A$ and $B$ corresponding to $|\psi_n\rangle$ respectively by $a_n$ and $b_n$, we can write

$$A|\psi_n\rangle=a_n|\psi_n\rangle$$
$$B|\psi_n\rangle=b_n|\psi_n\rangle$$

If the system happens to be in one of the eigenstates, say, $|\psi_n\rangle$, then both $A$ and $B$ can be simultaneously measured to any arbitrary level of precision, and we will get the results $a_n$ and $b_n$ respectively. This idea can be extended to more than two observables.

=== Examples of compatible observables ===
The Cartesian components of the position operator $\mathbf{r}$ are $x$, $y$ and $z$. These components are all compatible. Similarly, the Cartesian components of the momentum operator $\mathbf{p}$, that is $p_x$, $p_y$ and $p_z$ are also compatible.

== Formal definition ==
A set of observables $A, B, C...$ is called a CSCO if:

1. All the observables commute in pairs.
2. If we specify the eigenvalues of all the operators in the CSCO, we identify a unique eigenvector (up to a phase) in the Hilbert space of the system.

If we are given a CSCO, we can choose a basis for the space of states made of common eigenvectors of the corresponding operators. We can uniquely identify each eigenvector (up to a phase) by the set of eigenvalues it corresponds to.

== Discussion ==
Let us have an operator $\hat{A}$ of an observable $A$, which has all non-degenerate eigenvalues $\{a_n\}$. As a result, there is one unique eigenstate corresponding to each eigenvalue, allowing us to label these by their respective eigenvalues. For example, the eigenstate of $\hat{A}$ corresponding to the eigenvalue $a_n$ can be labelled as $|a_n\rangle$. Such an observable is itself a self-sufficient CSCO.

However, if some of the eigenvalues of $a_n$ are degenerate (such as having degenerate energy levels), then the above result no longer holds. In such a case, we need to distinguish between the eigenfunctions corresponding to the same eigenvalue. To do this, a second observable is introduced (let us call that $B$), which is compatible with $A$. The compatibility theorem tells us that a common basis of eigenfunctions of $\hat{A}$ and $\hat{B}$ can be found. Now if each pair of the eigenvalues $(a_n, b_n)$ uniquely specifies a state vector of this basis, we claim to have formed a CSCO: the set $\{A, B\}$. The degeneracy in $\hat{A}$ is completely removed.

It may so happen, nonetheless, that the degeneracy is not completely lifted. That is, there exists at least one pair $(a_n, b_n)$ which does not uniquely identify one eigenvector. In this case, we repeat the above process by adding another observable $C$, which is compatible with both $A$ and $B$. If the basis of common eigenfunctions of $\hat{A}$, $\hat{B}$ and $\hat{C}$ is unique, that is, uniquely specified by the set of eigenvalues $(a_n, b_n, c_n)$, then we have formed a CSCO: $\{A, B, C\}$. If not, we add one more compatible observable and continue the process till a CSCO is obtained.

The same vector space may have distinct complete sets of commuting operators.

Suppose we are given a finite CSCO $\{A, B, C,...,\}$. Then we can expand any general state in the Hilbert space as

$$|\psi\rangle =  \sum_{i,j,k,...} \mathcal{C}_{i,j,k,...} |a_i, b_j, c_k,...\rangle$$

where $|a_i, b_j, c_k,...\rangle$ are the eigenkets of the operators $\hat{A}, \hat{B}, \hat{C}$, and form a basis space. That is,

$\hat{A}|a_i, b_j, c_k,...\rangle = a_i|a_i, b_j, c_k,...\rangle$, etc

If we measure $A, B, C,...$ in the state $|\psi\rangle$ then the probability that we simultaneously measure $a_i, b_j, c_k,...$ is given by $|\mathcal{C}_{i,j,k,...}|^2$.

For a complete set of commuting operators, we can find a unitary transformation which will simultaneously diagonalize all of them.

== Examples ==
=== The hydrogen atom without electron or proton spin ===
Two components of the angular momentum operator $\mathbf{L}$ do not commute, but satisfy the commutation relations:

$$[L_i, L_j]=i\hbar\epsilon _{ijk} L_k$$

So, any CSCO cannot involve more than one component of $\mathbf{L}$. It can be shown that the square of the angular momentum operator, $L^2$, commutes with $\mathbf{L}$.

$$[L_x, L^2] = 0, [L_y, L^2] = 0, [L_z, L^2] = 0$$

Also, the Hamiltonian $\hat{H} = -\frac{\hbar^2}{2\mu}\nabla^2 - \frac{Ze^2}{r}$ is a function of $r$ only and has rotational invariance, where $\mu$ is the reduced mass of the system. Since the components of $\mathbf{L}$ are generators of rotation, it can be shown that

$$[\mathbf{L}, H] = 0, [L^2, H] = 0$$

Therefore, a commuting set consists of $L^2$, one component of $\mathbf{L}$ (which is taken to be $L_z$) and $H$. The solution of the problem tells us that disregarding spin of the electrons, the set $\{H, L^2, L_z\}$ forms a CSCO. Let $|E_n, l, m\rangle$ be any basis state in the Hilbert space of the hydrogenic atom. Then

$$H|E_n, l, m\rangle=E_n|E_n, l, m\rangle$$
$$L^2|E_n, l, m\rangle=l(l+1)\hbar^2|E_n, l, m\rangle$$
$$L_z|E_n, l, m\rangle=m\hbar|E_n, l, m\rangle$$

That is, the set of eigenvalues $\{E_n, l, m\}$ or more simply, $\{n, l, m\}$ completely specifies a unique eigenstate of the Hydrogenic atom.

=== The free particle ===
For a free particle, the Hamiltonian $H = -\frac{\hbar^2}{2m} \nabla^2$ is invariant under translations. Translation commutes with the Hamiltonian: $[H,\mathbf{\hat T}]=0$. However, if we express the Hamiltonian in the basis of the translation operator, we will find that $H$ has doubly degenerate eigenvalues. It can be shown that to make the CSCO in this case, we need another operator called the parity operator $\Pi$, such that $[H,\Pi]=0$.$\{H,\Pi\}$ forms a CSCO.

Again, let $|k\rangle$ and $|-k\rangle$ be the degenerate eigenstates of $H$corresponding the eigenvalue $H_k=\frac{{\hbar^2}{k^2}}{2m}$, i.e.

$$H|k\rangle=\frac{{\hbar^2}{k^2}}{2m}|k\rangle$$
$$H|-k\rangle=\frac{{\hbar^2}{k^2}}{2m}|-k\rangle$$

The degeneracy in $H$ is removed by the momentum operator $\mathbf{\hat p}$.

$$\mathbf{\hat p}|k\rangle=k|k\rangle$$
$$\mathbf{\hat p}|-k\rangle=-k|-k\rangle$$

So, $\{\mathbf{\hat p}, H\}$ forms a CSCO.

=== Addition of angular momenta ===
We consider the case of two systems, 1 and 2, with respective angular momentum operators $\mathbf{J_1}$ and $\mathbf{J_2}$. We can write the eigenstates of $J_1^2$ and $J_{1z}$ as $|j_1m_1\rangle$ and of $J_2^2$ and $J_{2z}$ as $|j_2m_2\rangle$.

$$J_1^2|j_1m_1\rangle=j_1(j_1+1)\hbar^2|j_1m_1\rangle$$
$$J_{1z}|j_1m_1\rangle=m_1\hbar|j_1m_1\rangle$$
$$J_2^2|j_2m_2\rangle=j_2(j_2+1)\hbar^2|j_2m_2\rangle$$
$$J_{2z}|j_2m_2\rangle=m_2\hbar|j_2m_2\rangle$$

Then the basis states of the complete system are $|j_1m_1;j_2m_2\rangle$ given by

$$|j_1m_1;j_2m_2\rangle=|j_1m_1\rangle \otimes |j_2m_2\rangle$$

Therefore, for the complete system, the set of eigenvalues $\{j_1,m_1,j_2,m_2\}$ completely specifies a unique basis state, and $\{J_1^2, J_{1z}, J_2^2, J_{2z}\}$ forms a CSCO. Equivalently, there exists another set of basis states for the system, in terms of the total angular momentum operator $\mathbf{J} = \mathbf{J_1}+\mathbf{J_2}$. The eigenvalues of $J^2$ are $j(j+1)\hbar^2$ where $j$ takes on the values $j_1+j_2, j_1+j_2-1,...,|j_1-j_2|$, and those of $J_z$ are $m$ where $m=-j, -j+1,...j-1,j$. The basis states of the operators $J^2$ and $J_z$ are $|j_1j_2;jm\rangle$. Thus we may also specify a unique basis state in the Hilbert space of the complete system by the set of eigenvalues $\{j_1,j_2,j,m\}$, and the corresponding CSCO is $\{J_1^2, J_2^2,J^2,J_z\}$.

== See also ==
- Quantum number
  - Good quantum number
- Degenerate energy levels
- Mathematical structure of quantum mechanics
- Operators in Quantum Mechanics
- Canonical commutation relation
- Measurement in quantum mechanics
- Collapse of the wavefunction
- Angular Momentum (Quantum Mechanics)
