= Antonino Lo Surdo =

Italian physicist (1880–1949)

Antonino Lo Surdo (4 February 1880 in Syracuse – 7 June 1949 in Rome) was an Italian physicist. He was appointed as professor of physics at the Istituto di Fisica in Rome in 1919; upon the death of Orso Mario Corbino in 1937, he became the director. Lo Surdo studied terrestrial physics, including seismology and geophysics; the 1908 Messina earthquake caused the death of his parents and other close relatives, except his brother. He contributed to the foundation of the Istituto Nazionale di Geofisica under the auspices of the Consiglio Nazionale delle Ricerche, when its president was Guglielmo Marconi.

His name is remembered for the discovery (made independently by Johannes Stark) in 1913 of the effect on an electric field on the emission spectrum of a gas. This physical phenomenon is called the Stark-Lo Surdo effect in Italy (and is generally known outside Italy simply as the Stark effect). The discovery of the effect was a remarkably important contribution to the development of the quantum theory. Lo Surdo's discovery of the effect led Antonio Garbasso to introduce quantum theory into the Italian universities.
