= Angelo Battelli =

Italian physicist (1862–1916)

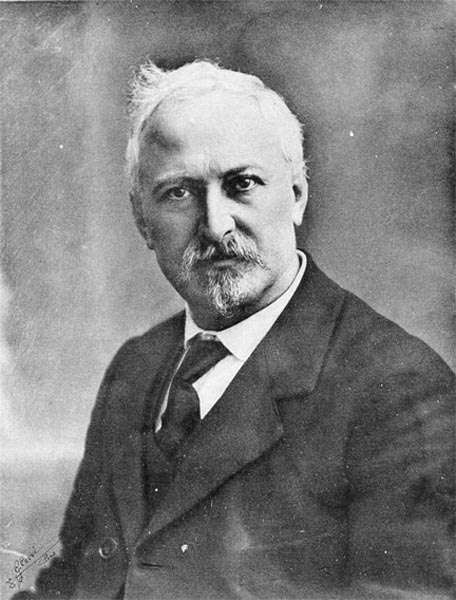
- Angelo Battelli (unknown date).
- Born: 28 March 1862; Macerata Feltria, Province of Pesaro and Urbino, Marche, Italy
- Died: 11 December 1916 (aged 54); Pisa, Province of Pisa, Tuscany, Italy
- Education: University of Turin (doctor of philosophy)
- Scientific career
- Fields: Physics
- Workplaces: University of Pisa; University of Padua
- Doctoral advisor: Andrea Naccari
- Doctoral students: Luigi Puccianti

Angelo Battelli (28 March 1862 – 11 December 1916) was an Italian scientist, notable for having measured temperatures and heats of fusion of non-metallic substances, metallic conductivities and thermoelectric effects in magnetic metals, and the Thomson effect. He investigated osmotic pressures, surface tensions, and physical properties of carbon disulfide (CS_{2}), water (H_{2}O), and alcohols, especially their vapor pressures, critical points, and densities. He studied X-rays and cathode rays. He investigated the resistance of solenoids to high-frequency alternating currents.

== Early life and education ==
Batelli was born in Macerata Feltria, a comune (municipality) in the Province of Pesaro e Urbino, in the Marche region of Italy.

He obtained his doctor of philosophy in 1884 from the University of Turin in Turin, the capital of the Piedmont region of Italy, under Andrea Naccari, his doctoral advisor.

== Career ==
He was the doctoral advisor of physicist Luigi Puccianti.

In 1897 he founded the Italian Physical Society.

== Death ==
Batelli died in Pisa, the capital city of the Province of Pisa, in the Tuscany region of Italy.
