= Stark effect =

Spectral line splitting in electrical field

Computed energy level spectrum of hydrogen as a function of the electric field near n = 15 for magnetic quantum number m = 0. Each n level consists of n degenerate sublevels; application of an electric field breaks the degeneracy. Energy levels can cross due to underlying symmetries of motion in the Coulomb potential.

The Stark effect is the shifting and splitting of spectral lines of atoms and molecules due to the presence of an external electric field. It is the electric-field analogue of the Zeeman effect, where a spectral line is split into several components due to the presence of the magnetic field. Although initially coined for the static case, it is also used in the wider context to describe the effect of time-dependent electric fields. In particular, the Stark effect is responsible for the pressure broadening (Stark broadening) of spectral lines by charged particles in plasmas. For most spectral lines, the Stark effect is either linear (proportional to the applied electric field) or quadratic with a high accuracy.

The Stark effect can be observed both for emission and absorption lines. The latter was sometimes called the inverse Stark effect, but this term is no longer used in the modern literature.

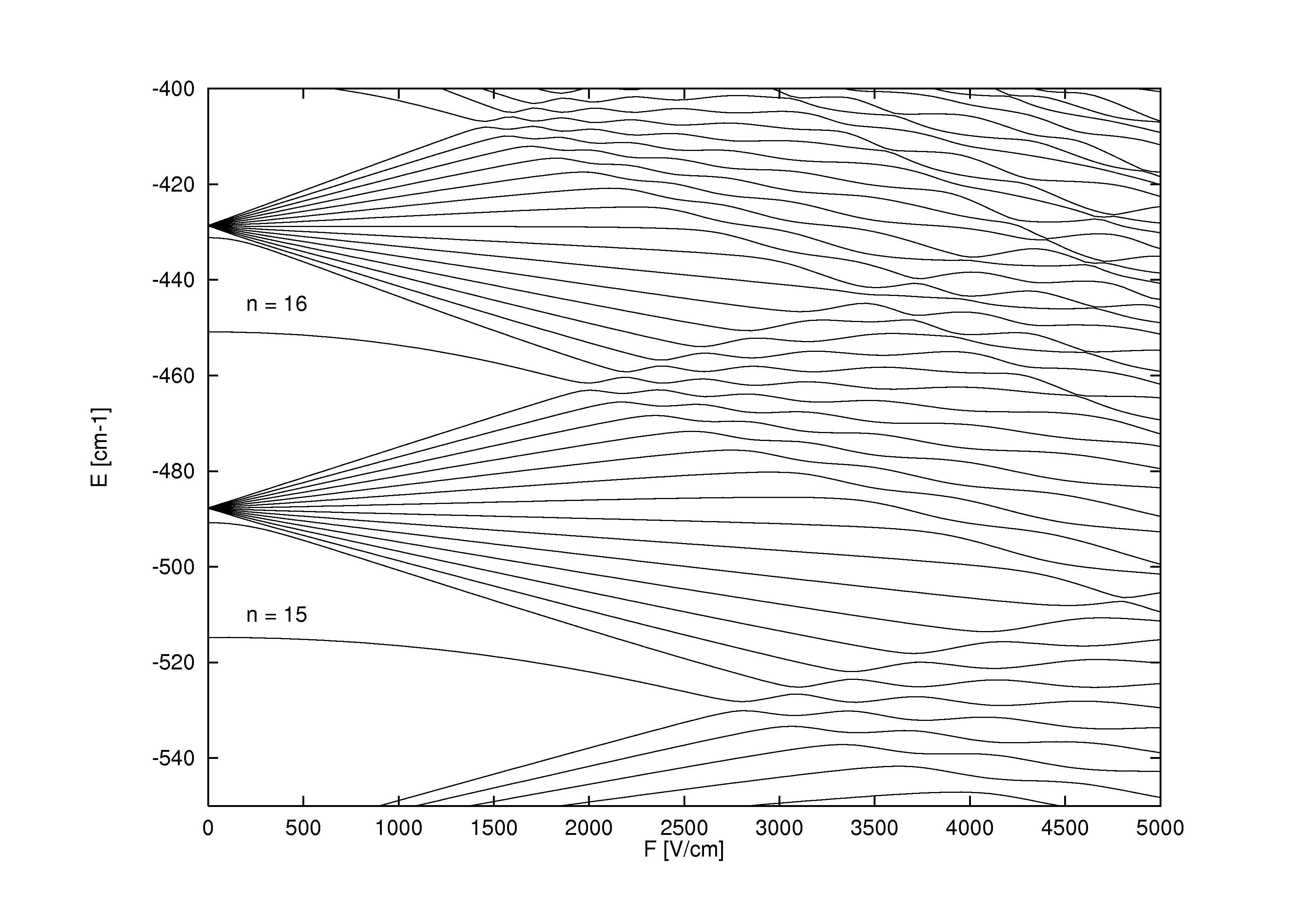
Lithium Rydberg-level spectrum as a function of the electric field near n = 15 for m = 0. Note how a complicated pattern of the energy levels emerges as the electric field increases, not unlike bifurcations of closed orbits in classical dynamical systems leading to chaos.

== History ==
The effect is named after the German physicist Johannes Stark, who discovered it in 1913. It was independently discovered in the same year by the Italian physicist Antonino Lo Surdo, and in Italy, the effect is named Stark–Lo Surdo. The discovery of this effect contributed significantly to the development of quantum theory, and Stark was awarded the Nobel Prize in Physics in 1919.

Inspired by the magnetic Zeeman effect, and especially by Hendrik Lorentz's explanation of it, Woldemar Voigt performed classical mechanical calculations of quasi-elastically bound electrons in an electric field. Using experimental indices of refraction, he estimated the expected effect. This estimate was a few orders of magnitude too low. Not deterred by this prediction, Stark undertook measurements on excited states of the hydrogen atom and succeeded in observing splittings.

By the use of the Bohr–Sommerfeld ("old") quantum theory, Paul Epstein and Karl Schwarzschild were independently able to derive equations for the linear and quadratic Stark effect in hydrogen. Four years later, Hendrik Kramers derived formulas for intensities of spectral transitions. Kramers also included the effect of fine structure, with corrections for relativistic kinetic energy and coupling between electron spin and orbital motion. The first quantum mechanical treatment (in the framework of Werner Heisenberg's matrix mechanics) was by Wolfgang Pauli. Erwin Schrödinger discussed at length the Stark effect in his third paper on quantum theory (in which he introduced his perturbation theory), once in the manner of the 1916 work of Epstein (but generalized from the old to the new quantum theory) and once by his (first-order) perturbation approach. Finally, Epstein reconsidered the linear and quadratic Stark effect from the point of view of the new quantum theory. He derived equations for the line intensities, which were a decided improvement over Kramers's results obtained by the old quantum theory.

While the first-order (linear) Stark effect in hydrogen is in agreement with both the old Bohr–Sommerfeld model and the quantum-mechanical theory of the atom, higher-order corrections are not. Measurements of the Stark effect under high field strengths confirmed the correctness of the new quantum theory.

== Mechanism ==
=== Overview ===
Imagine an atom with occupied 2s and 2p electron states. In the Bohr model, these states are degenerate. However, in the presence of an external electric field, these electron orbitals will hybridize into eigenstates of the perturbed Hamiltonian (where each perturbed hybrid state can be written as a superposition of unperturbed states). Since the 2s and 2p states have opposite parity, these hybrid states will lack inversion symmetry and will possess a time-averaged electric dipole moment. If this dipole moment is aligned with the electric field, the energy of the state will shift down; if this dipole moment is anti-aligned with the electric field, the energy of the state will shift up. Thus, the Stark effect causes a splitting of the original degeneracy.

Other things being equal, the effect of the electric field is greater for outer electron shells because the electron is more distant from the nucleus, resulting in a larger electric dipole moment upon hybridization.

=== Multipole expansion ===
The Stark effect originates from the interaction between a charge distribution (atom or molecule) and an external electric field. The interaction energy $V_\mathrm{int}$ of a continuous charge distribution $\rho(\mathbf{r})$, confined within a finite volume $\mathcal{V}$, with an external electrostatic potential $\phi(\mathbf{r})$ is
$$V_\mathrm{int} = \int\limits_\mathcal{V} \phi(\mathbf{r}) \rho(\mathbf{r}) \;\mathrm{d}^3\mathbf r$$
This expression is valid classically and quantum-mechanically alike. If the potential varies weakly over the charge distribution, the multipole expansion converges fast, so only a few first terms give an accurate approximation. Namely, keeping only the zeroth- and first-order terms,
$$\phi(\mathbf{r}) \approx \phi(\mathbf{0}) - \sum_{i=1}^3 F_i\,r_i$$
where we introduced the electric field $F_i \equiv - \left. \left(\frac{\partial \phi}{\partial r_i} \right)\right|_\mathbf{r=0}$ and assumed the origin $\mathbf{0}$ to be somewhere within $\mathcal{V}$. Therefore, the interaction becomes
$$V_\mathrm{int} \approx \phi(\mathbf{0}) \int\limits_\mathcal{V} \rho(\mathbf{r}) \;\mathrm{d}^3\mathbf r - \sum_{i=1}^3 F_i  \int\limits_\mathcal{V} \rho(\mathbf{r})r_i \;\mathrm{d}^3\mathbf r \equiv q \phi(\mathbf{0}) - \sum_{i=1}^3 F_i\,\mu_i = q \phi(\mathbf{0}) - \mathbf{F} \cdot \boldsymbol{\mu} ,$$
where $q$ and $\boldsymbol{\mu}$ are, respectively, the total charge (zero moment) and the dipole moment of the charge distribution.

Classical macroscopic objects are usually neutral or quasi-neutral ($q = 0$), so the first, monopole, term in the expression above is identically zero. This is also the case for a neutral atom or molecule. However, for an ion this is no longer true. Nevertheless, it is often justified to omit it in this case, too. Indeed, the Stark effect is observed in spectral lines, which are emitted when an electron "jumps" between two bound states. Since such a transition only alters the internal degrees of freedom of the radiator but not its charge, the effects of the monopole interaction on the initial and final states exactly cancel each other.

=== Perturbation theory ===
Turning now to quantum mechanics an atom or a molecule can be thought of as a collection of point charges (electrons and nuclei), so that the second definition of the dipole applies. The interaction of atom or molecule with a uniform external field is described by the operator
$$V_{\mathrm{int}} = - \mathbf{F}\cdot \boldsymbol{\mu}.$$
This operator is used as a perturbation in first- and second-order perturbation theory to account for the first- and second-order Stark effect.

==== First order ====
Let the unperturbed atom or molecule be in a g-fold degenerate state with orthonormal zeroth-order state functions $\psi^0_1, \ldots, \psi^0_g$. (Non-degeneracy is the special case g = 1). According to perturbation theory the first-order energies are the eigenvalues of the g × g matrix with general element
$$(\mathbf{V}_{\mathrm{int}})_{kl} = \langle \psi^0_k |  V_{\mathrm{int}} | \psi^0_l \rangle =
-\mathbf{F}\cdot \langle \psi^0_k | \boldsymbol{\mu} | \psi^0_l \rangle,
\qquad k,l=1,\ldots, g.$$
If g = 1 (as is often the case for electronic states of molecules) the first-order energy becomes proportional to the expectation (average) value of the dipole operator $\boldsymbol{\mu}$,
$$E^{(1)} = -\mathbf{F}\cdot \langle \psi^0_1 | \boldsymbol{\mu} | \psi^0_1 \rangle =
-\mathbf{F}\cdot \langle  \boldsymbol{\mu} \rangle.$$
Since the electric dipole moment is a vector (tensor of the first rank), the diagonal elements of the perturbation matrix V_{int} vanish between states that have a definite parity. Atoms and molecules possessing inversion symmetry do not have a (permanent) dipole moment and hence do not show a linear Stark effect.

In order to obtain a non-zero matrix V_{int} for systems with an inversion center it is necessary that some of the unperturbed functions $\psi^0_i$ have opposite parity (obtain plus and minus under inversion), because only functions of opposite parity give non-vanishing matrix elements. Degenerate zeroth-order states of opposite parity occur for excited hydrogen-like (one-electron) atoms or Rydberg states. Neglecting fine-structure effects, such a state with the principal quantum number n is n^{2}-fold degenerate and
$$n^2 = \sum_{\ell=0}^{n-1} (2 \ell + 1),$$
where $\ell$ is the azimuthal (angular momentum) quantum number. For instance, the excited n = 4 state contains the following $\ell$ states,
$$16 = 1 + 3 + 5 +7 \;\; \Longrightarrow\;\;  n=4\;\text{contains}\; s\oplus p\oplus d\oplus f.$$
The one-electron states with even $\ell$ are even under parity, while those with odd $\ell$ are odd under parity. Hence hydrogen-like atoms with n>1 show first-order Stark effect.

The first-order Stark effect occurs in rotational transitions of symmetric top molecules (but not for linear and asymmetric molecules). In first approximation a molecule may be seen as a rigid rotor. A symmetric top rigid rotor has the unperturbed eigenstates
$$|JKM \rangle = (D^J_{MK})^* \quad\text{with}\quad M,K= -J,-J+1,\dots,J$$
with 2(2J+1)-fold degenerate energy for |K| > 0 and (2J+1)-fold degenerate energy for K=0. Here D^{J}_{MK} is an element of the Wigner D-matrix. The first-order perturbation matrix on basis of the unperturbed rigid rotor function is non-zero and can be diagonalized. This gives shifts and splittings in the rotational spectrum. Quantitative analysis of these Stark shift yields the permanent electric dipole moment of the symmetric top molecule.

==== Second order ====
As stated, the quadratic Stark effect is described by second-order perturbation theory. The zeroth-order eigenproblem
$$H^{(0)} \psi^0_k = E^{(0)}_k \psi^0_k, \quad k=0,1, \ldots, \quad E^{(0)}_0 < E^{(0)}_1 \le E^{(0)}_2, \dots$$
is assumed to be solved. The perturbation theory gives
$$E^{(2)}_k = \sum_{k' \neq k} \frac{\langle \psi^0_k | V_\mathrm{int} | \psi^0_{k^\prime} \rangle \langle \psi^0_{k'} | V_\mathrm{int} | \psi^0_k \rangle}{E^{(0)}_k - E^{(0)}_{k'}} \equiv -\frac{1}{2} \sum_{i,j=1}^3 \alpha_{ij} F_i F_j$$
with the components of the polarizability tensor α defined by
$$\alpha_{ij} = -2\sum_{k' \neq k} \frac{\langle \psi^0_k | \mu_i | \psi^0_{k'} \rangle \langle \psi^0_{k'} | \mu_j | \psi^0_k \rangle}{E^{(0)}_k - E^{(0)}_{k'}}.$$
The energy E^{(2)} gives the quadratic Stark effect.

Neglecting the hyperfine structure (which is often justified — unless extremely weak electric fields are considered), the polarizability tensor of atoms is isotropic,
$$\alpha_{ij} \equiv \alpha_0 \delta_{ij} \Longrightarrow E^{(2)} = -\frac{1}{2} \alpha_0 F^2.$$
For some molecules this expression is a reasonable approximation, too.

For the ground state $\alpha_0$ is always positive, i.e., the quadratic Stark shift is always negative.

==== Problems ====
The perturbative treatment of the Stark effect has some problems. In the presence of an electric field, states of atoms and molecules that were previously bound (square-integrable), become formally (non-square-integrable) resonances of finite width. These resonances may decay in finite time via field ionization. For low lying states and not too strong fields the decay times are so long, however, that for all practical purposes the system can be regarded as bound. For highly excited states and/or very strong fields ionization may have to be accounted for. (See also the article on the Rydberg atom).

== Applications ==
The Stark effect is at the basis of the spectral shift measured for voltage-sensitive dyes used for imaging of the firing activity of neurons.

The Stark effect is used to slow down and manipulate molecular beams.

== See also ==
- Zeeman effect
- Autler–Townes effect
- Quantum-confined Stark effect
- Stark spectroscopy
- Inglis–Teller equation
- Electric field NMR
- Stark effect in semiconductor optics
