= Tjusterby Manor =

Coordinates: 60°10′33″N 24°12′01″E

- Tjusterby gård / Tyyskylän kartano
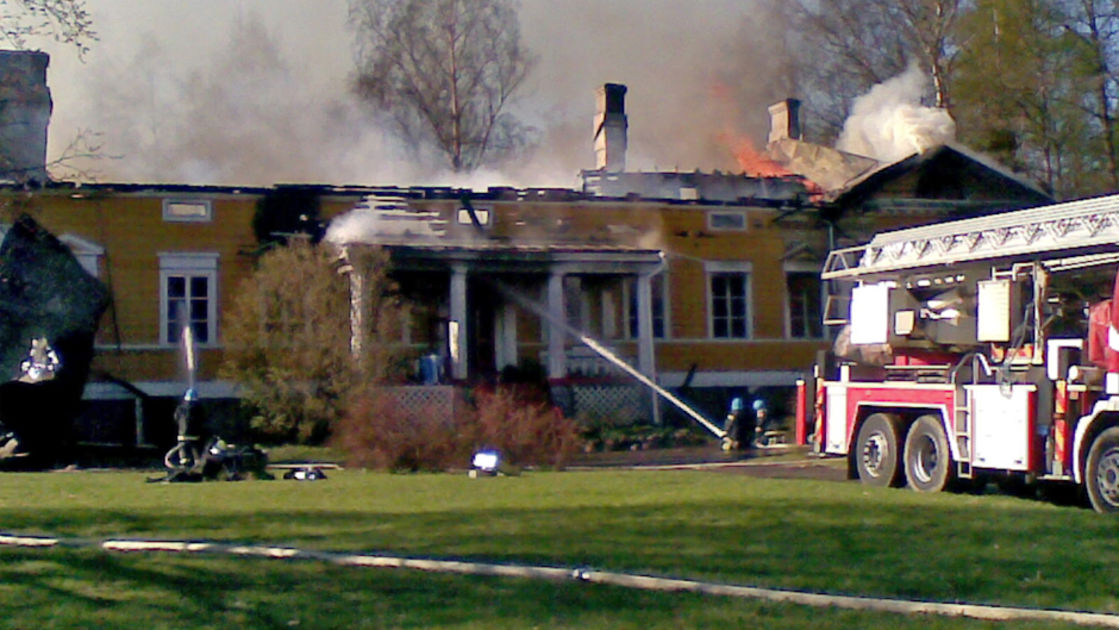
- Firetrucks trying to extinguish Tjusterby Manor's fire in 2011.

General information
- Architectural style: Empire
- Location: Tjusterby gård, 02570 Siuntio kk, Siuntio, Finland
- Year built: 1800s
- Owner: Private

Technical details
- Floor count: 2

Design and construction
- Architect: Carl Ludvig Engel

Tjusterby Manor (Swedish: Tjusterby gård, Finnish: Tyyskylän kartano) is a manor house in Siuntio in the Finnish region of Uusimaa. The manor house is located in Siuntio Church Village by the prehistoric Skällberget hill fort. The former main building of Tjusterby Manor was destroyed in a fire on the 8th of May 2011. A new main building was constructed later the same year. Tjusterby Manor is owned privately.

== History and architecture ==
=== The Old Manor House ===
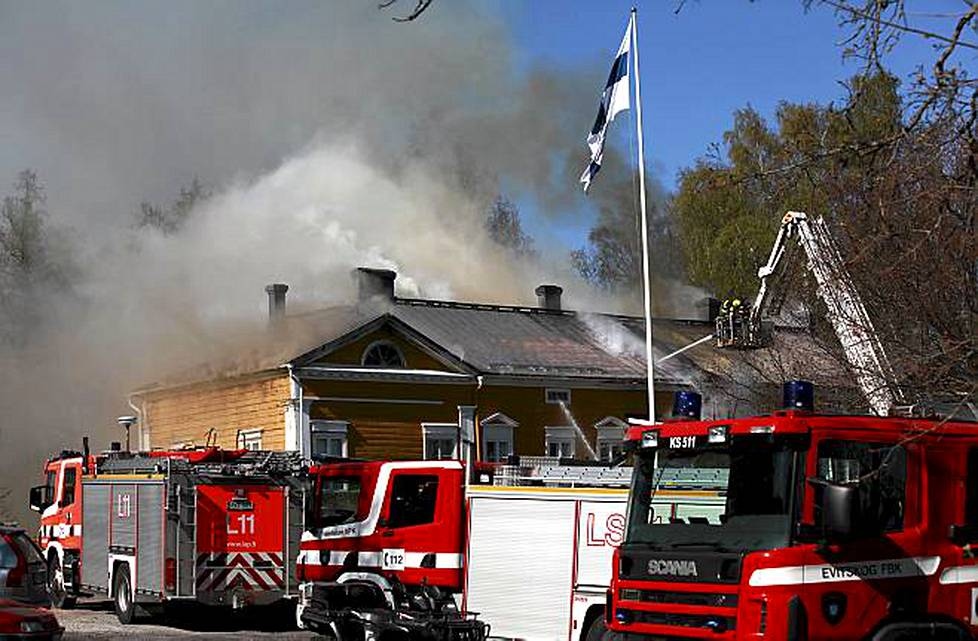
Tjusterby Manor in flames in 2011.

The original main building of Tjusterby was destroyed in a fire in 1903. After the fire, a new main building, designed most likely by famed architect Carl Ludvig Engel, was moved from Helsinki to Siuntio. As previously mentioned, this 19th-century building was destroyed in a fire in 2011. The manor house was under restoration, and the fire started when paint was being removed inside the manor by using heat blowers.

The building represented empire style. Its frame was made of timber and the facades were painted yellow. The two-storey construction encompassed 450 square metres.

Tjusterby Manor was owned privately until the 1960s, when it became a course centre for people with visual disabilities. In the 1980s Tjusterby became a rehabilitation centre to aid people with drug addiction. Later on, the rehabilitation centre was closed down, and the manor house stood empty for some years, until it was bought by private individuals, who started renovating the manor house to make it a private home once again.

The old manor by Engel was one of the most important sights in Siuntio. The manor house was considered a significant cultural object even on the national level.

=== The New Manor House ===
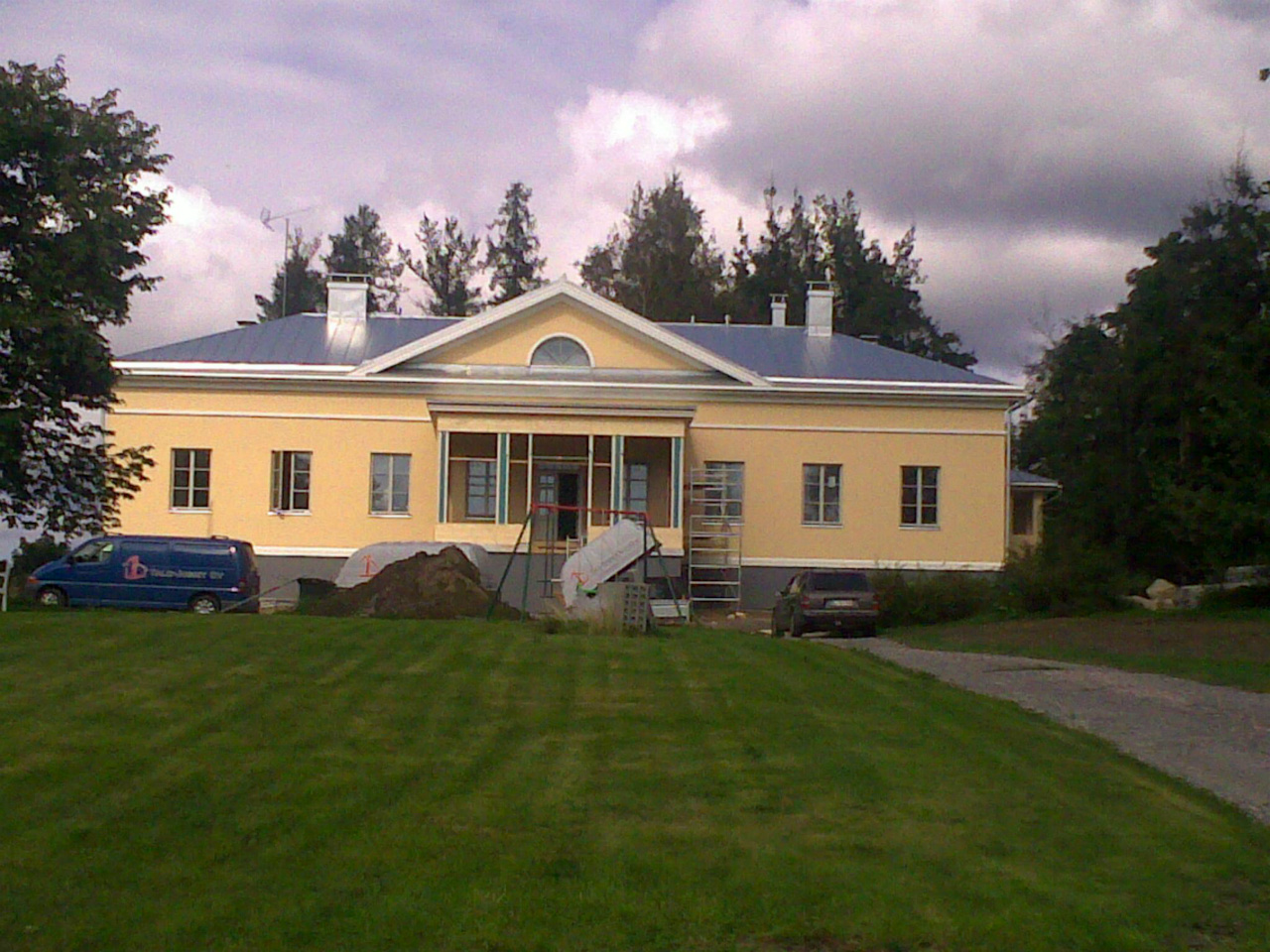
The new main building, built in 2011.

The new Tjusterby Manor was constructed on the same place of the previous manor, destroyed in a fire. Stone elements were used as construction material, and the building works were completed in 2011. Only an old stone cellar, located under the main building remains from the former main building. The new Tjusterby was constructed by JokaRak Oy. Architecturally the new manor house resembles the old one.

== See also ==
- Pickala Manor
- Siuntio
- Suitia Manor
- Sjundby Manor
