= Siuntio =

Municipality in Uusimaa, Finland

Siuntio Siuntio (Finnish) Sjundeå (Swedish)
- Municipality
- Siuntion kunta Sjundeå kommun
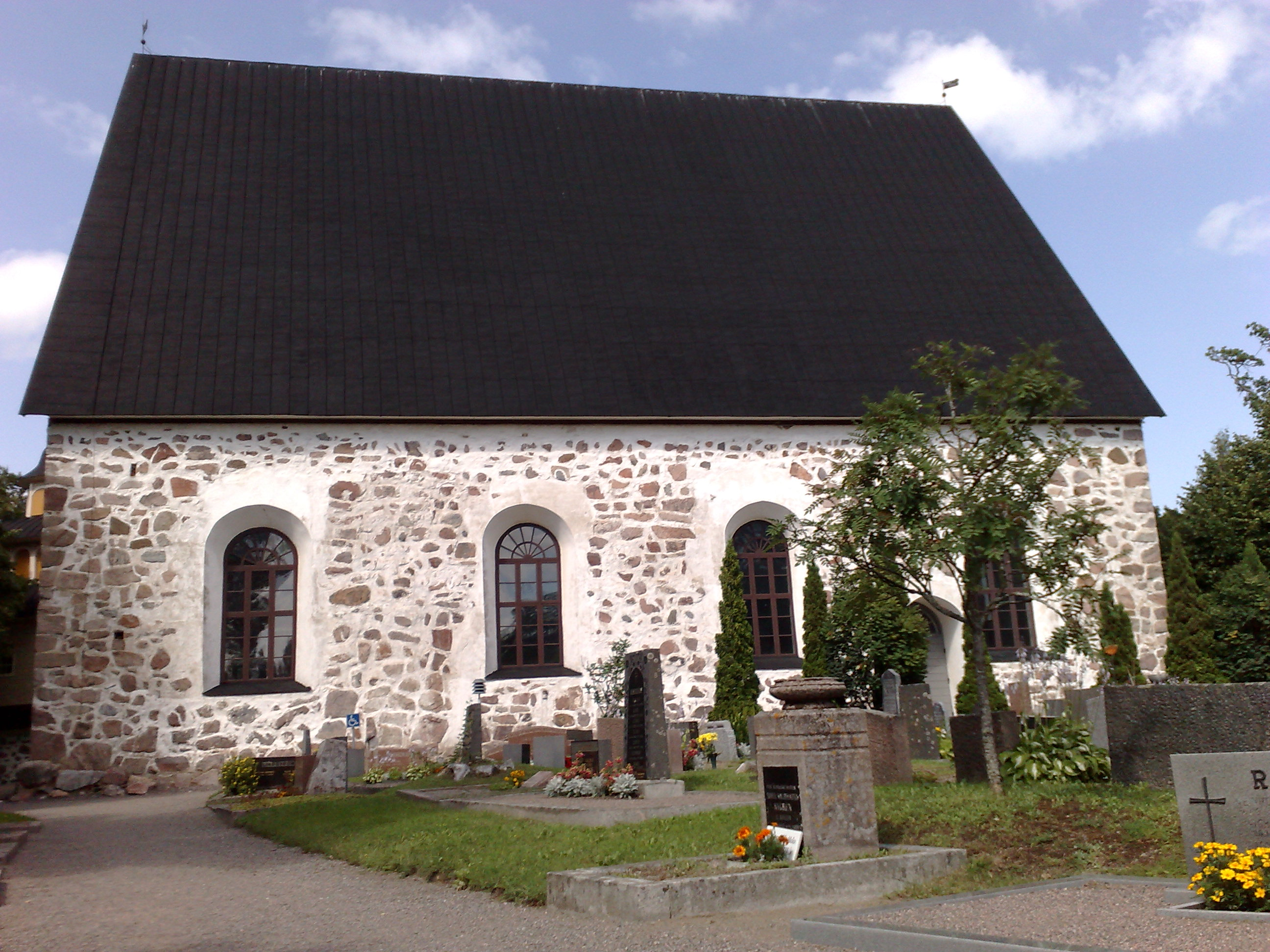
- St. Peter's Church in Siuntio

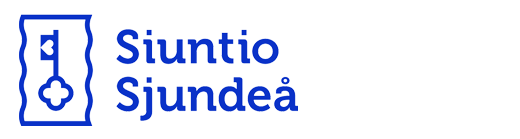
- Coat of arms Logo
- Motto: Ota rauhallisesti – Ta det lugnt
- Location of Siuntio in Finland
- Interactive map of Siuntio
- Coordinates: 60°08′15″N 24°13′35″E
- Country: Finland
- Region: Uusimaa
- Sub-region: Helsinki sub-region
- Year when first mentioned: 1382
- Seat: Siuntion asemanseutu

Government
  - Municipality manager: Inka Tikkanen

Area (2018-01-01)
  - Total: 266.12 km^{2} (102.75 sq mi)
  - Land: 241.27 km^{2} (93.15 sq mi)
  - Water: 24.96 km^{2} (9.64 sq mi)
  - Rank: 249th largest in Finland

Population (2025-12-31)
  - Total: 6,192
  - Rank: 151st largest in Finland
  - Density: 25.66/km^{2} (66.5/sq mi)

Population by native language
  - Finnish: 65.2% (official)
  - Swedish: 26% (official)
  - Others: 8.8%

Population by age
  - 0 to 14: 17.3%
  - 15 to 64: 63%
  - 65 or older: 19.7%
- Time zone: UTC+02:00 (EET)
  - Summer (DST): UTC+03:00 (EEST)
- Climate: Dfb
- Website: www.siuntio.fi

Siuntio (Finnish: [ˈsiu̯ntio]; Swedish: Sjundeå) is a municipality in the Uusimaa region of Southern Finland. Its neighboring municipalities are Ingå to the west, Kirkkonummi to the east, Lohja to the north-west, and Vihti to the north. It is 46 kilometres (29 mi) west of Helsinki.

As of 2021, the population was 6,192 with a population density of 25.66 inhabitants per square kilometre (66.5/sq mi). The municipality covers an area of 266.12 square kilometres (102.75 sq mi), of which 24.96 km^{2} (9.64 sq mi) is water.

Siuntio is a bilingual municipality with Finnish and Swedish as its official languages. The population consists of 65% Finnish speakers, 26% Swedish speakers, and 9% speakers of other languages. Previously, the majority of the population spoke Swedish until the 1980s.

Siuntio's motto is "Ota rauhallisesti – Ta det lugnt", which means "take it easy" in Finnish and Swedish respectively. The municipality's rebranding program introduced the new motto along with a new logo in 2021.

== History ==
=== Early history ===
Siuntio has been inhabited since the Stone Age, with the oldest evidence of farming settlements discovered in the river valley around the medieval Siuntio church. Many Bronze Age burial sites can also be found in Siuntio, such as Krejansberget hill and Luntoberget hill near St. Peter's Church. Some Iron Age sites, like Ekeberga Burial Site, are also found in the municipality. Apart from burial sites also a prehistoric hill fort, Skällberget, is found opposite to the church. The oldest known document mentioning Siuntio is from 1382. The document addresses a donation to the Church of St. Lawrence in Lohja.

=== The Middle Ages ===
During the Middle Ages two large manor houses, Suitia and Sjundby, were built in Siuntio.

The earliest mention of Suitia Manor is from 1420 in a document addressing a border conflict between Suitia estate and an estate owned by the bailiff of Häme Castle. Later, the estate came to the possession of the Fleming family. Over time, the Flemings acquired new land for the Suitia estate; at one point, Suitia had its own harbor by the sea near the mouth of Pickala river. The Flemings also built the first ironworks in Finland, located on the grounds of Suitia Manor, in the 1530s.

The Sjundby Manor House is first mentioned in a document from 1417. The manor was owned by a number of nobles and royals, including Queen Christina of Sweden.

The stone St. Peter's Church was built around 1480 on the site of previous wooden church buildings. The sacristy, the oldest part of the church, and armory were removed after the church caught fire in 1823.

=== 1800–2000 ===
The National Author of Finland, Aleksis Kivi, lived in Siuntio in Fanjunkars croft from 1864 to 1871.

The old municipality center around the church started to lose its significance after the coastal railway was built. The new railway station was built a few kilometers south of the church, which resulted in the creation of the new municipal center around the railway station.

After the Second World War, parts of Southern Siuntio were leased to the Soviet Union as part of the Porkkala Naval Base for 50 years following the 1944 Moscow Armistice between Finland, the Soviet Union and the United Kingdom. Although the land was returned to Finland in 1956, signs of Soviet occupation can still be found around the area, including military orders written in Cyrillic script on the walls of the dairy house of the Sjundby Manor House and a Soviet Triumphal Arch near Pickala Manor House.

=== 2000–present ===
In 2011 Siuntio, together with the municipalities of Karjalohja, Sammatti and Nummi-Pusula, decided to merge with the city of Lohja starting in 2013. The decision was made following encouragement from the Finnish State to merge smaller municipalities together. The goal was to create larger administrative areas to eventually cut costs. However, the decision caused a conflict between the Siuntio political parties, which also divided the population. After several unclear negotiations, Siuntio failed to deliver any kind of answers and therefore was cut out of the merge with Lohja.

In 2018 Siuntio joined the Helsinki Regional Transport Authority, securing good public transportation connections to Helsinki sub-region.

== Nature and geography ==
The northern part of Siuntio has many high hills and a large esker covered in forest, while the southern part of Siuntio is less hilly but also covered in forests. Smaller and larger lakes can also be found in the southern and middle parts of Siuntio. The western parts of Siuntio have large flat areas of cultivated fields.

Siuntio has also a few Natura 2000 nature protection areas such as the Plytberg Oak Forest, Torsgård's old forest, Meiko-Lappträsk lake area and the riverbanks of Siuntio river.

=== Urban area ===
In 2019 there were 6,126 inhabitants in Siuntio and about half of them were living in the urban areas of Siuntio. The largest urban areas of Siuntio are the new municipal centre Siuntion asemanseutu (lit. 'Siuntio station area') around the railway station and the old municipal centre Siuntion kirkonkylä (lit. 'Siuntio church village') around Siuntio church. About 2,500 people were living around Siuntio railway station and, much less, about 350 people were living around the St. Peter's Church.

=== Rural area ===
Rural built area of Siuntio is characterised by farm houses and larger manor houses, such as Pickala Manor, and Tjusterby Manor.

== Sports ==
Sjundeå Idrottsförening is a sports club established in 1918 in Siuntio. The main sports they play are handball and athletics. The largest handball cup of Finland, Sjundeå Cup, is annually played in Siuntio.

== Religion ==
Christianity is the major religion in Siuntio. The Evangelical Lutheran Church of Finland is the largest religious organisation in Siuntio and it is divided into two parishes: The Finnish-speaking parish (Siuntion suomalainen seurakunta) and the Swedish-speaking parish (Sjundeå svenska församling). Both parishes share the medieval stone church dedicated to St. Peter.

Helsinki parish of the Finnish Orthodox Church is also active in Siuntio.

== Sights and cultural heritage ==
=== The Medieval Church of St. Peter ===
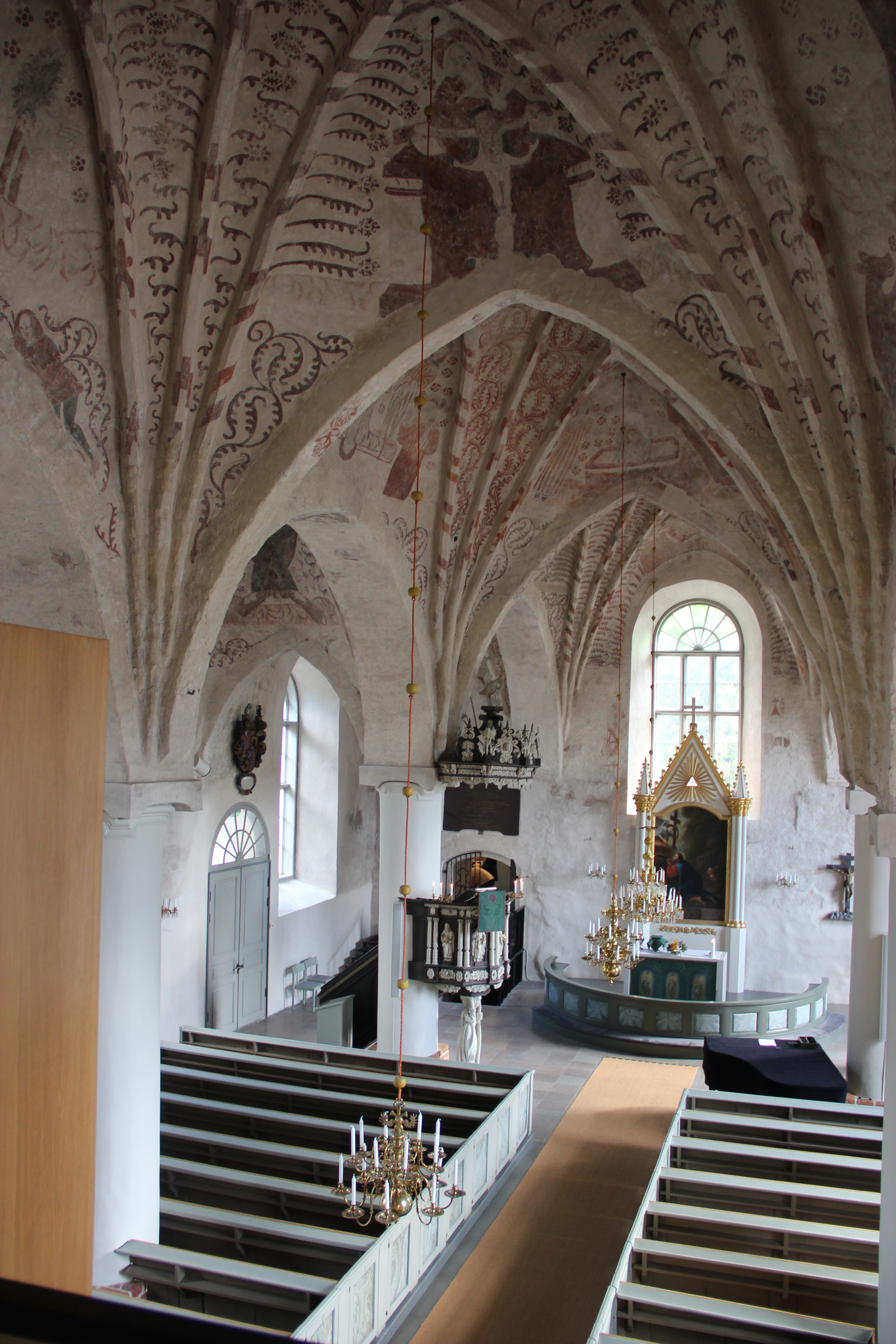
Inside Siuntio's St. Peter's Church

The Church of St. Peter in Siuntio was built around the 1480s during Finland's Catholic time, and the church still has biblical paintings on its vaults from that era. The oldest objects inside the church are also from the Middle Ages.

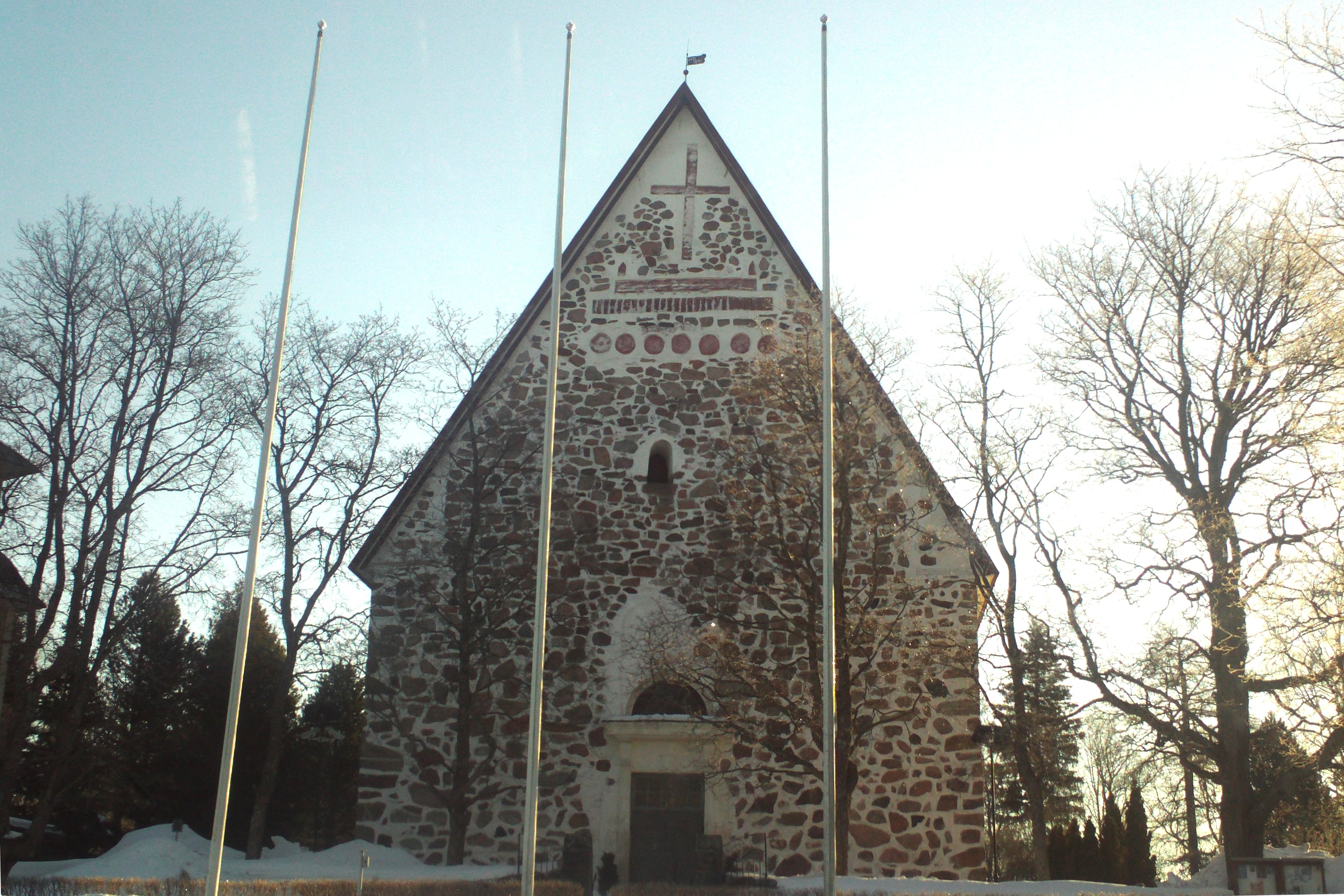
St. Peter's Church in Siuntio

=== Suitia Manor House ===
The Suitia Manor House (Fin. Suitian kartano, Swe. Svidja slott) is a large stone-built manor house built in the 1540s. The walls of the two-storey building are over one meter thick for defensive reasons. The first floor was rebuilt at the beginning of the 1760s by Esbjörn Reuterholm.

The state of Finland sold Suitia to a private owner for 11.7 million euros in 2015. Suitia, together with St. Peter's Church, are listed as Nationally Significant Built Cultural Environments and are protected by the Finnish Heritage Agency.

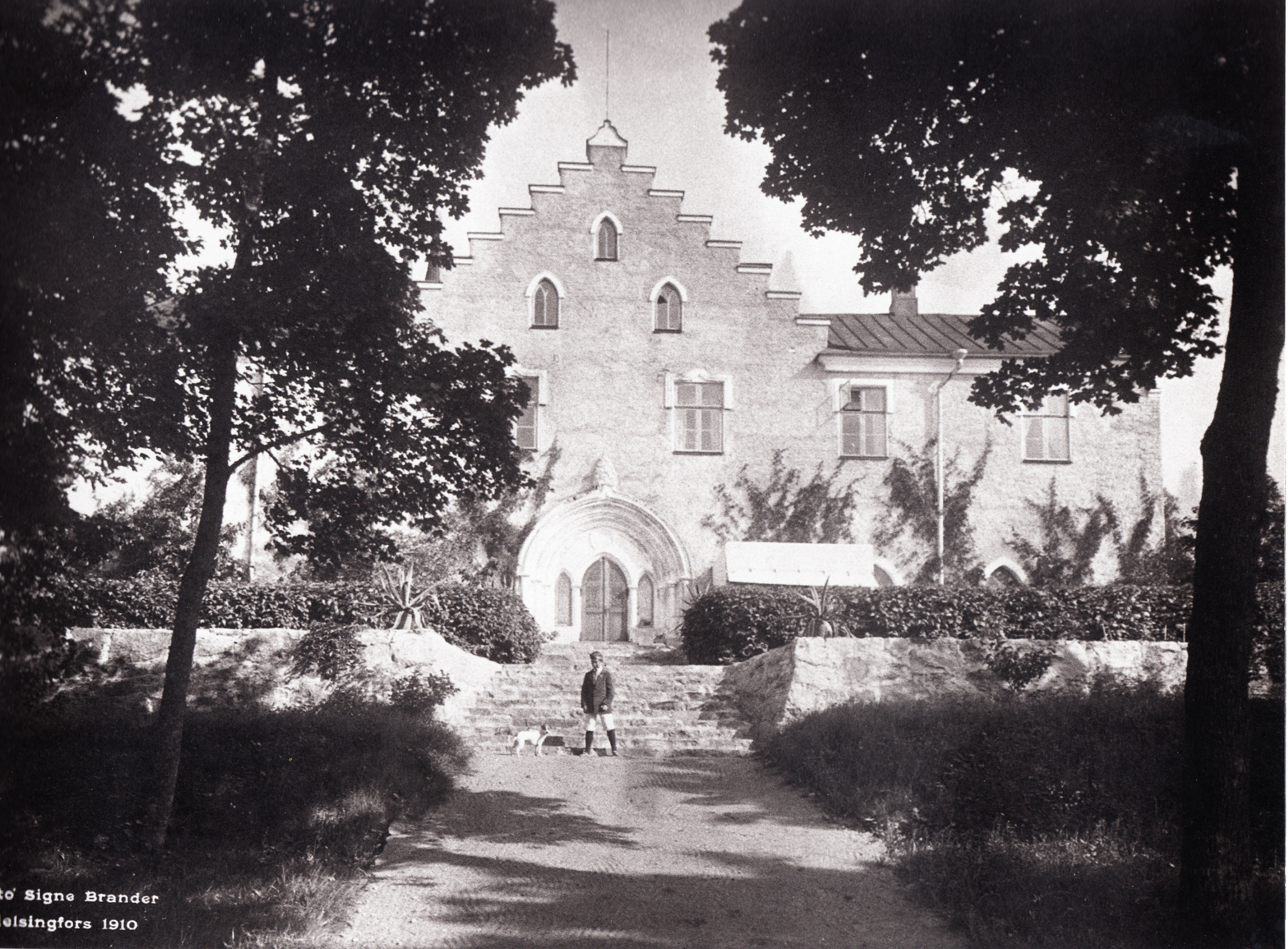
Suitia Manor

=== Sjundby Manor House ===
The Sjundby Manor House was built in the 1560s by Swedish king Gustav Vasa's stall master Jakob Henriksson. The Adlercreutz family has owned Sjundby since the 18th century and tours inside the castle are arranged during summer.

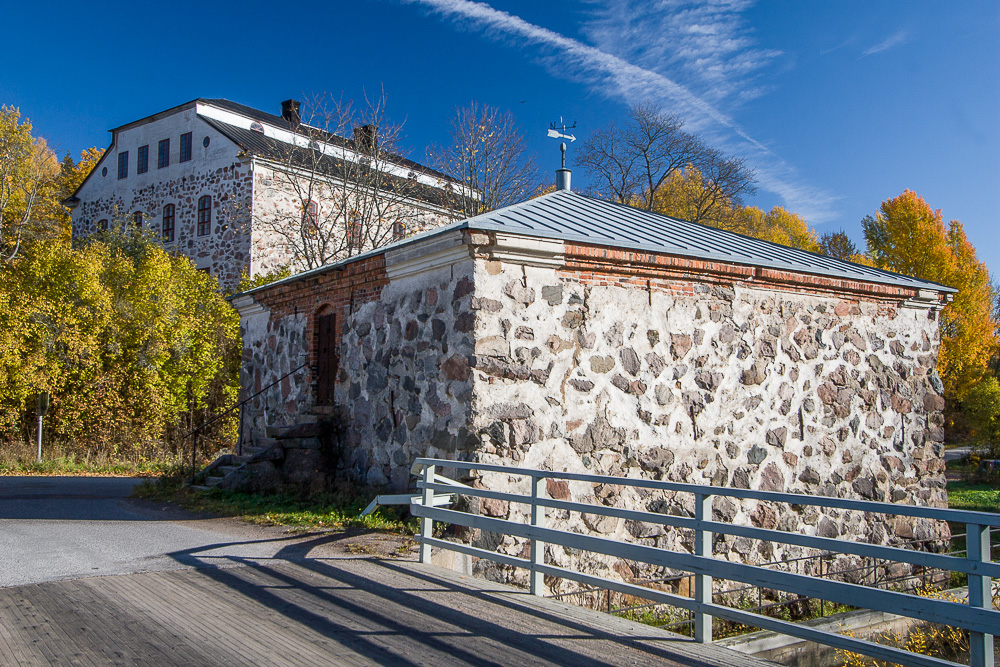
Sjundby Manor

Sjundby was on the Soviet side of the border during the Soviet lease of Porkkala Naval Base. During this period, the house was badly damaged but was eventually restored. Writings in Cyrillic script instructing how Soviet soldiers should behave can still be seen on the walls of the Sjundby dairy house.

Sjundby is listed as a Nationally Significant Built Cultural Environment and is protected by the Finnish Heritage Agency.

=== Pickala Manor House and Soviet Triumphal Arch ===
The Pickala Manor House was on the Soviet side of the border during the leasing of Porkkala Naval Base. Near the manor house runs a cobblestone road, known as the Kabanov's road, which runs from Pickala to a Soviet triumphal arch, the only surviving Soviet Triumphal arch in Finland. The road was paved with cobblestone to make it strong enough for Soviet military vehicles to drive on.

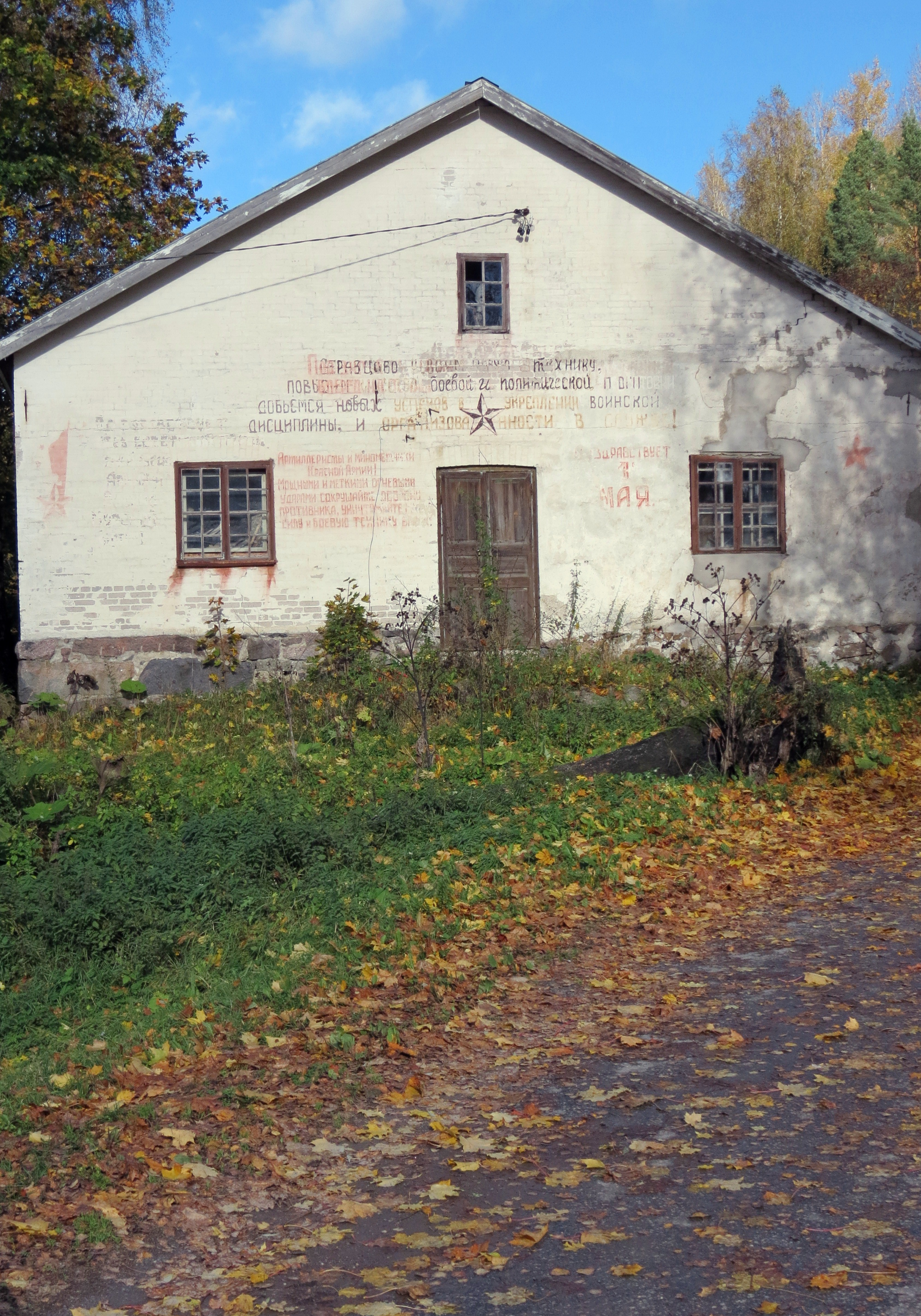
Sjundby's dairy house and Cyrillic script on the wall

Pickala Manor House and its surroundings are listed as Nationally Significant Built Cultural Environment and protected by the Finnish Heritage Agency.

=== Tjusterby Manor House ===
The Tjusterby Manor House was one of the oldest wooden manor houses in Siuntio. The house was located near the church in the Tjusterby hamlet. The Manor House was moved from Helsinki to Siuntio in the late 19th century. Tjusterby Manor was destroyed in a large fire in 2011.

=== Gårdskulla Manor and Agricultural Museum ===
Gårdskulla Manor is one of the largest farms in Finland with about 680 hectares of land. The main building is from the 1850s. Gårdskulla has a large collection of agricultural artefacts shown in its private museum. Over 100 old tractors, some cars, tools and steam machines are shown there.

=== Siuntio Museum ===
Siuntio Museum, located in Siuntio Church Village, hosts permanent exhibitions regarding the local history and heritage of the municipality all the way from prehistory to modern-day independent Finland.

=== Fanjunkars ===
Fanjunkars is a military croft and a museum in Siuntio. The croft housed the national author of Finland, Aleksis Kivi, between 1864 and 1871. Kivi wrote some of his most famous works in Fanjunkars in Siuntio, such as The Seven Brothers.

=== Coat of Arms ===
The Coat of Arms of Siuntio.

The coat of arms of Siuntio is the heraldic symbol of the municipality. It was designed by A. W. Rancken and approved by the Ministry of the Interior on 22nd April 1950. The subject of the coat of arms is a key between two wavy beams. The key symbolises St. Peter who is the patron saint of the medieval stone church of Siuntio. The colours of the coat of arms are similar to the coat of arms of Uusimaa region. The official heraldic explanation of the coat of arms is: In a blue field, a horizontally positioned golden key, with a cross in the shaft and the handle designed as a quadrilateral, between two bars of silver which form wave-like patterns.

== Notable people ==
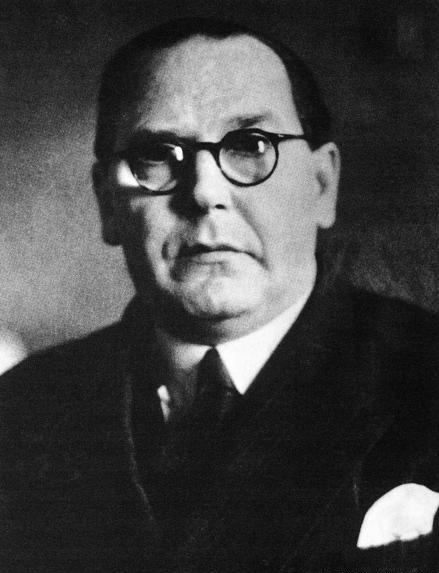
Karl-August Fagerholm

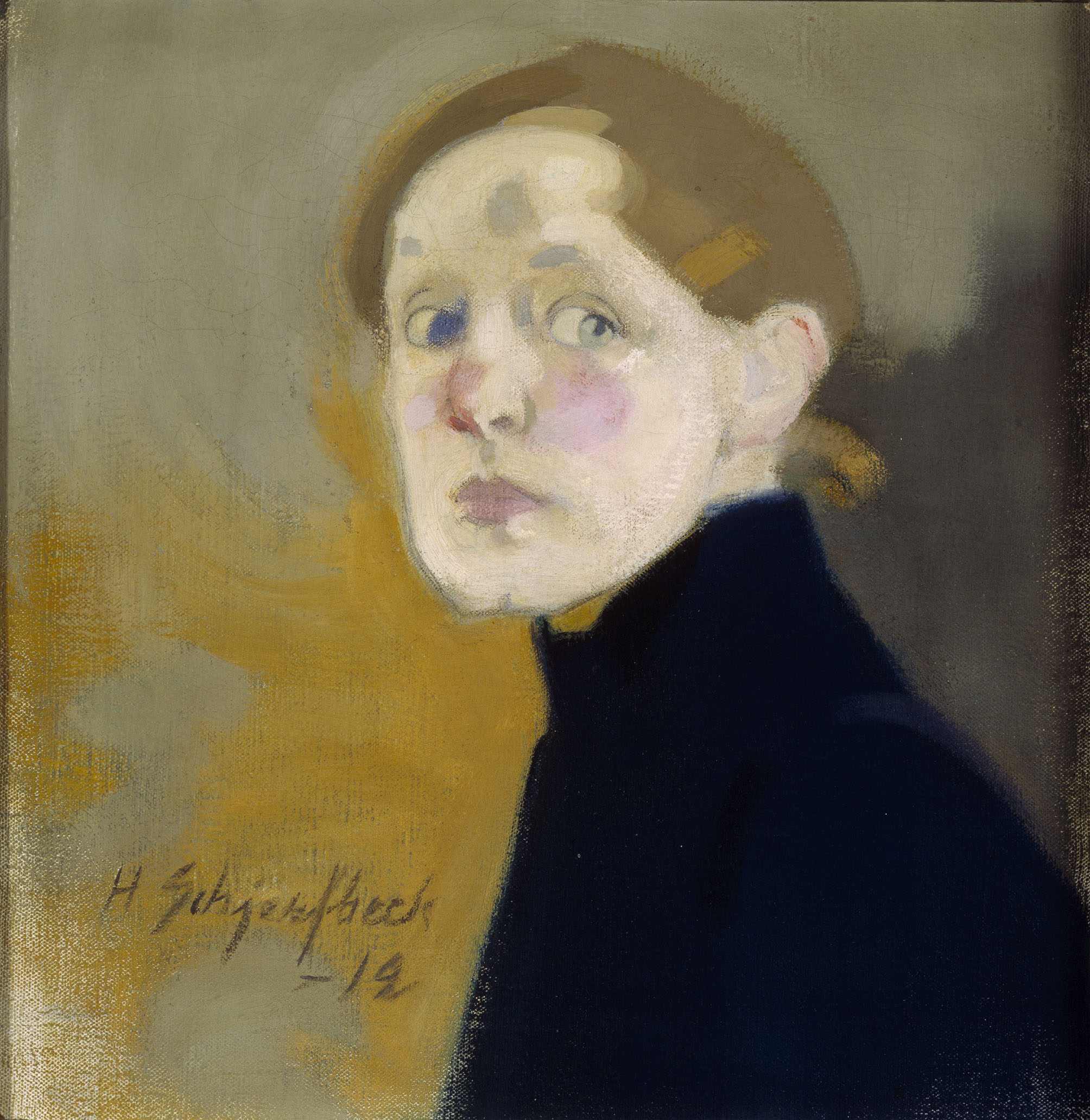
Helene Schjerfbeck, self-portrait.

- Karl-August Fagerholm, (1901–1984): the Speaker of Parliament and three times Prime Minister of Finland, he was born in Siuntio.
- Klaus Fleming (1535–1597): baron, admiral and marshal.
- Axel Olof Freudenthal, (1836–1911): Swedish-speaking Finnish philologist and politician.
- Aleksis Kivi (1834–1872): National Author of Finland.
- Ronya, (born 1991), Finnish Swedish-British singer-songwriter
- Helene Schjerfbeck (1862-1946): Artist.
- Henrik Tomas Adlercreutz (1732–1801): Landowner.
- August Wrede af Elimä: Freiherr.
- Otto Mauritz Krebs (1683–1768): warlord.
- Mona Leo (1903–1986): author
- Esbjörn Reuterholm (1710–1773): Freiherr and Council of the Realm
- Hebla Sparre (1490–1571): landowner and noble woman, wife to Erik Fleming, she owned Suitia Manor.
- Christoffer Strandberg (born 1989): actor.
- Juhani Stenvall: Aleksis Kivi's brother.

== Education ==
After the decision to close and sell Päivärinne primary school in 2018, two schools remained in Siuntio: Finnish-speaking Aleksis Kiven koulu and Swedish-speaking Sjundeå svenska skola.

In 2020 Siuntio started constructing a new school complex in the municipal centre after Aleksis Kiven koulu was demolished due to it sinking in the ground and its inner air problems. The new building complex, called Siuntion Sydän – Sjundeå Hjärta, was completed in 2022 and houses the communal library and both schools.

Siuntio does not have any upper secondary schools and teenagers usually start attending school in neighbouring Kirkkonummi, Lohja, Vihti or alternatively Helsinki after upper comprehensive school.

The University of Helsinki had a research farm in Siuntio at Suitia Manor until 2005.
