= Siuntion asemanseutu =

Siuntio Station Area Finnish: Siuntion asemanseutu Swedish: Sjundeå stationssamhälle
- Village
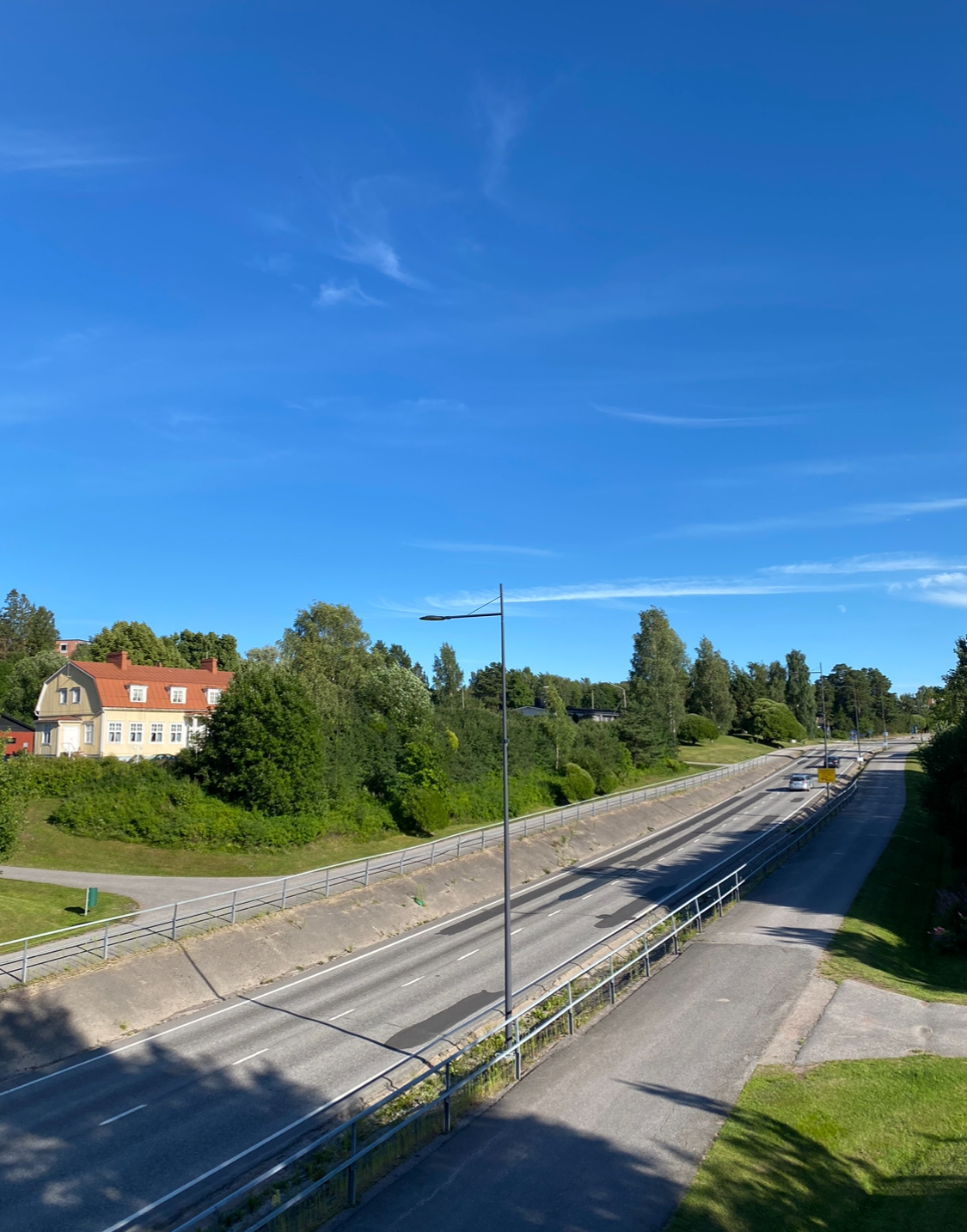
- The main road through the village centre.

- Location in Finland
- Coordinates: 60°08′19.03″N 24°13′37.74″E
- Country: Finland
- Region: Uusimaa
- Municipality: Siuntio

Area
  - Total: 3.61 km^{2} (1.39 sq mi)

Population (31 December 2020)
  - Total: 2,284
  - Density: 6,327/km^{2} (16,390/sq mi)
- Time zone: UTC+2 (EET)
  - Summer (DST): UTC+3 (EEST)
- Postal code: 02580

Siuntion asemanseutu (Swedish: Sjundeå stationssamhälle; both lit. Siuntio station area) is a village and administrative center of the Siuntio municipality in Uusimaa, Finland. At the end of 2020, the village had 2,284 inhabitants. It is located near the Highway 51 between Helsinki and Raseborg. As its name suggests, the village has developed in the immediate vicinity of the Siuntio railway station along the Coastal Railway, from where the X and Y trains go to Helsinki.

The village mainly has small houses, but there are also a few apartment buildings in the area. Basic services are available in the area, such as S-market grocery store, restaurants and cafés, pharmacy, barbershop, kindergarten, nursing home, two primary schools, municipal library and health center.

== Images ==
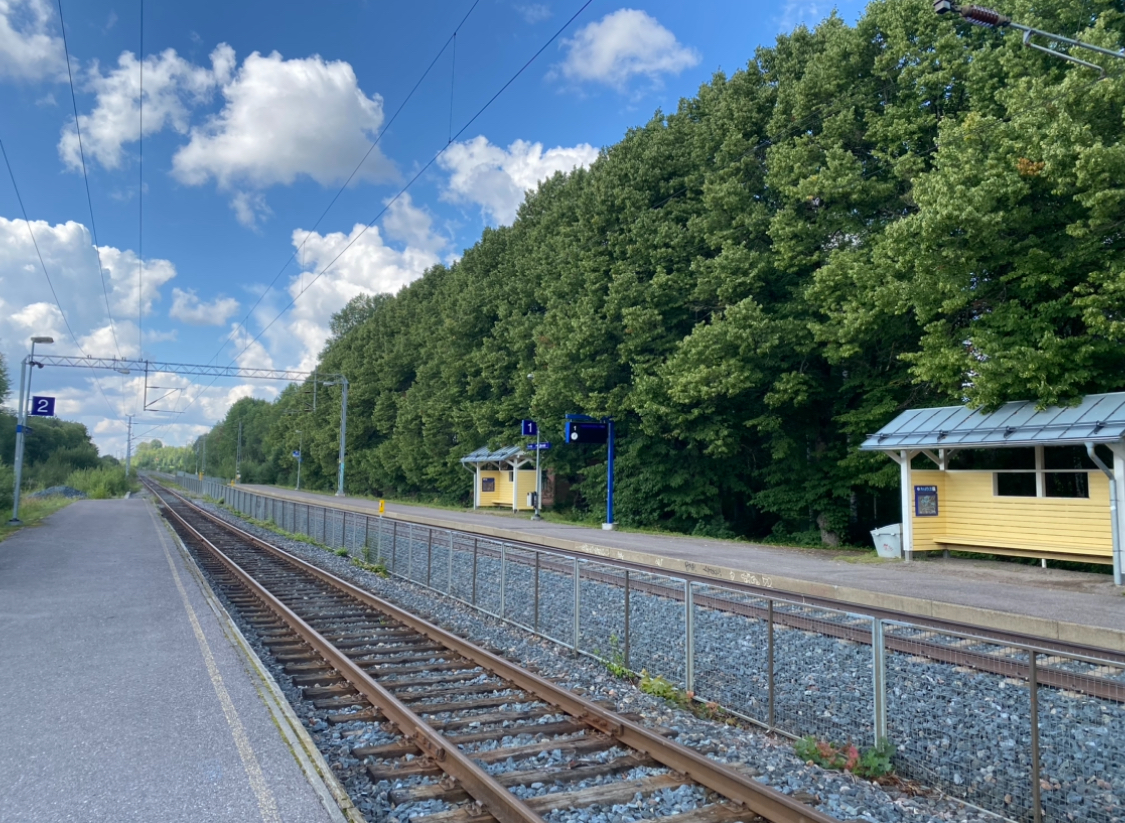
Siuntio railway station in 2024.

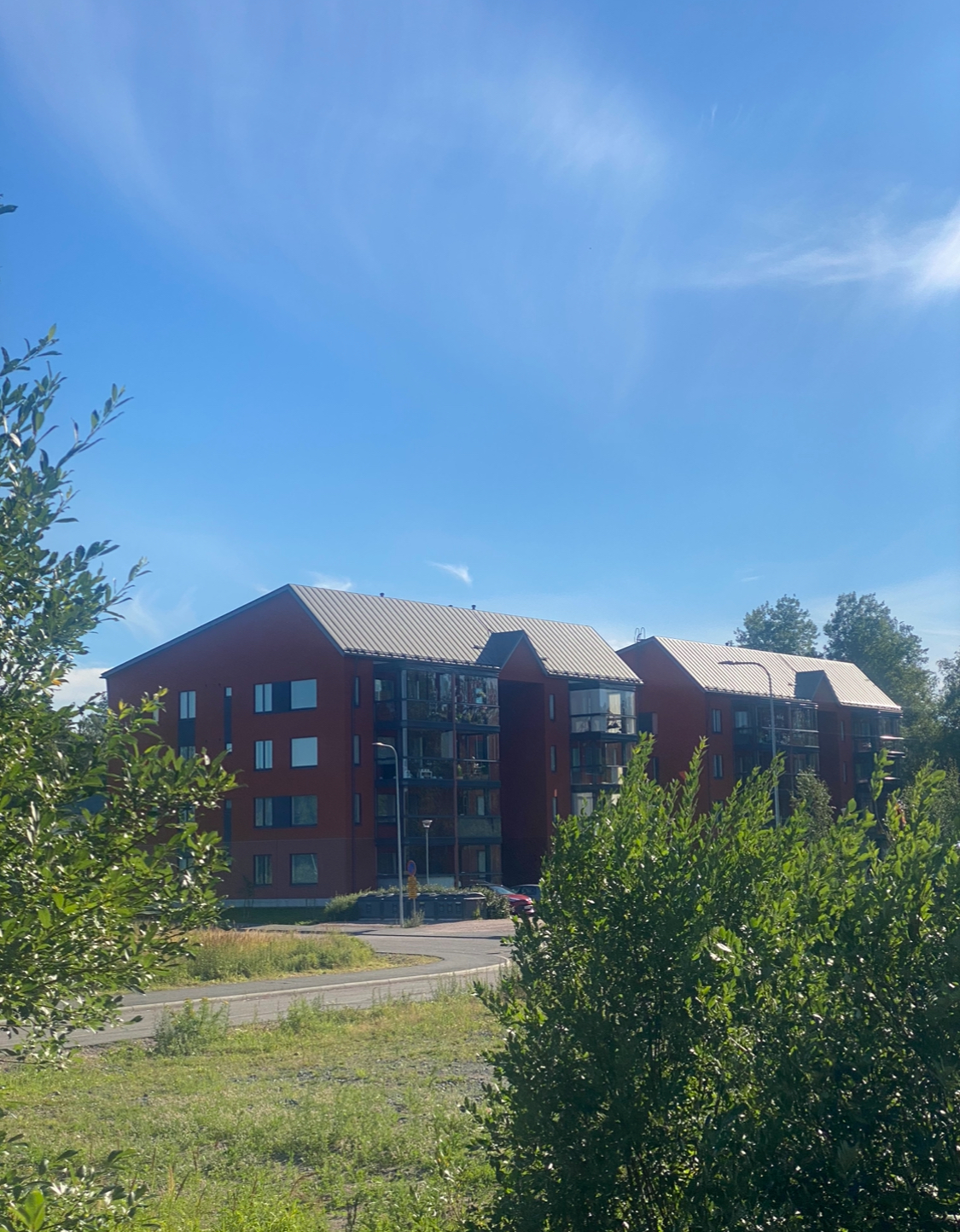
Apartment buildings by the railway station.

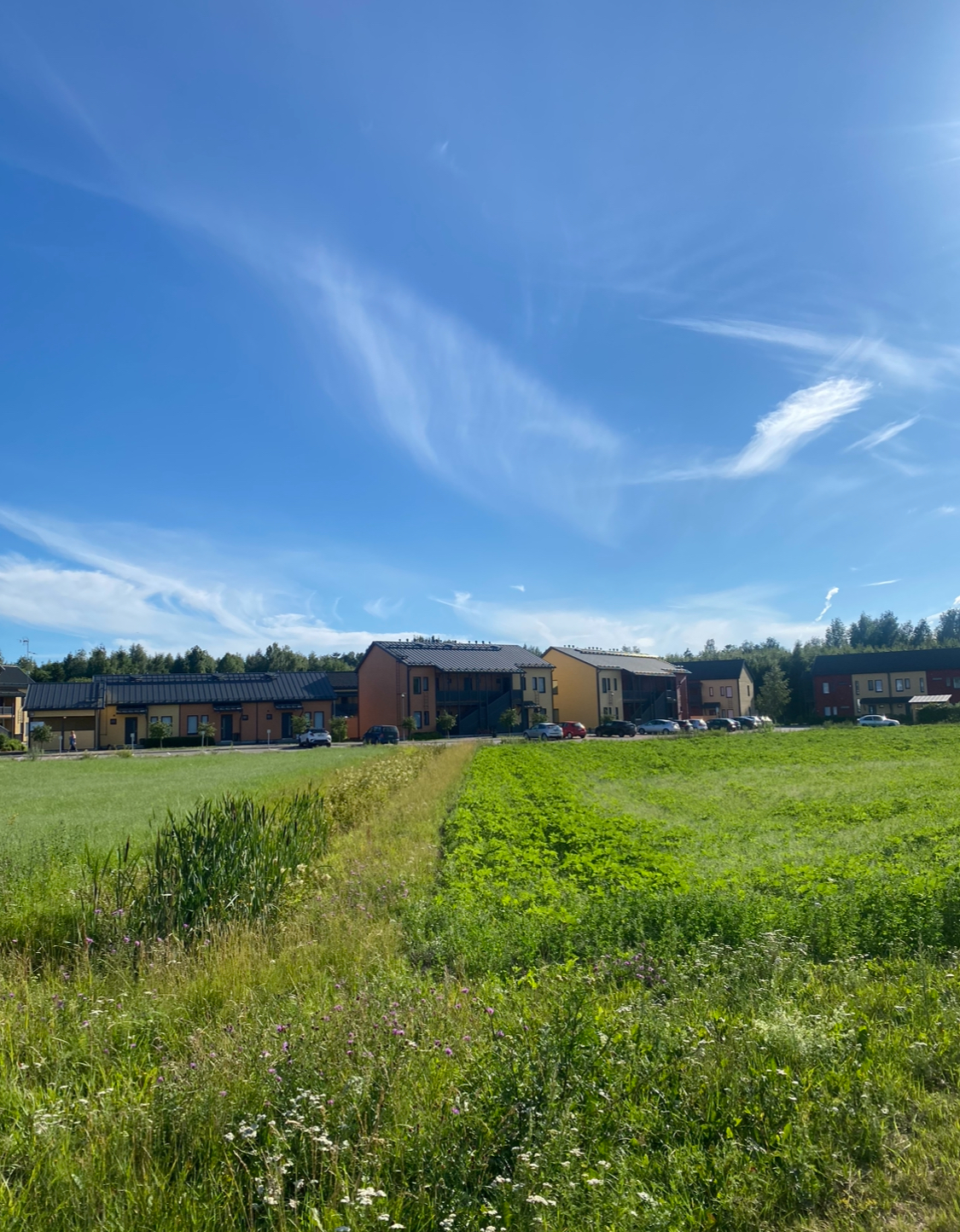
Newer houses at Siuntio central area.

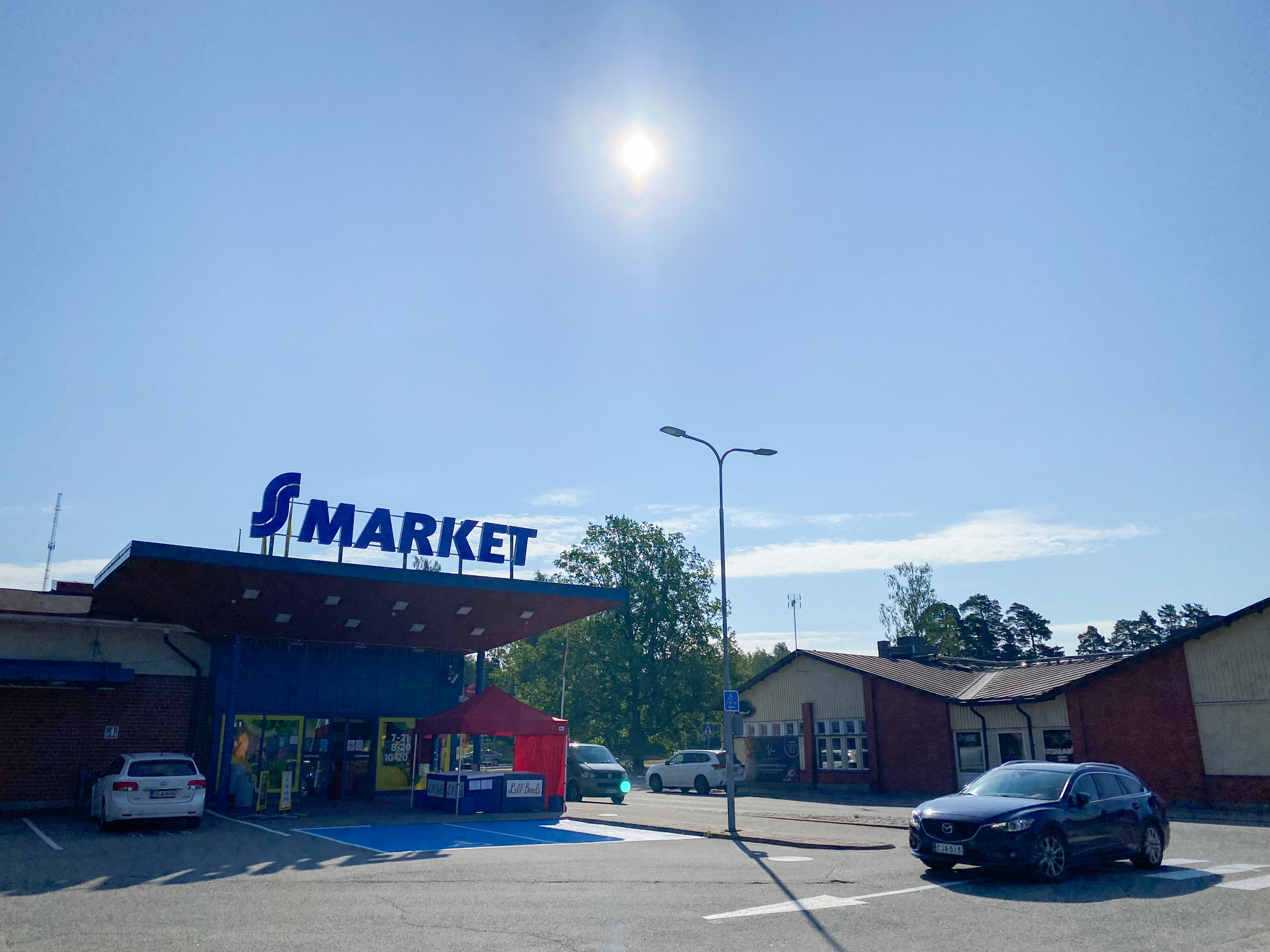
Grocery store S-Market.

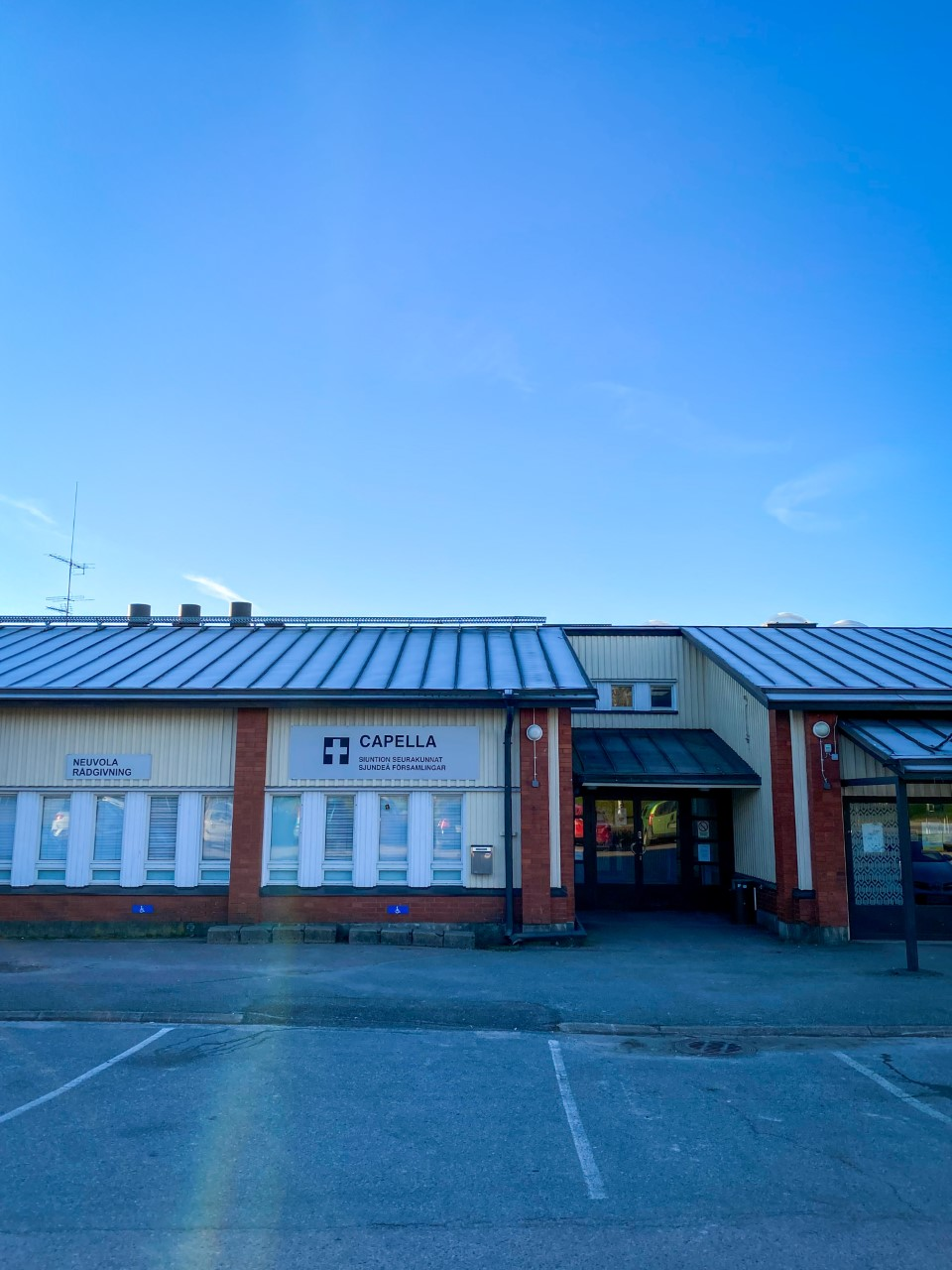
Church and parish hall Capella.

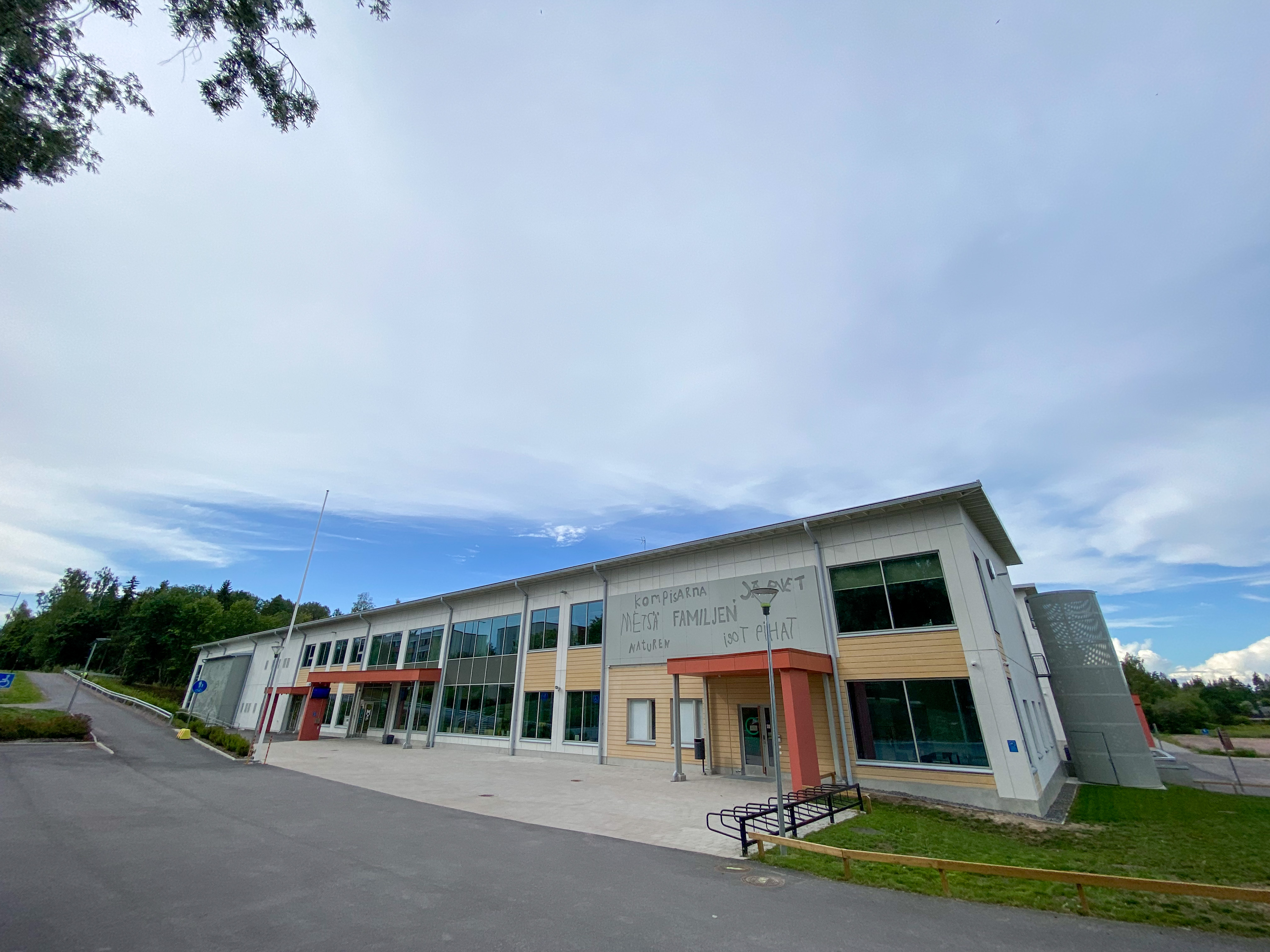
School and municipal library

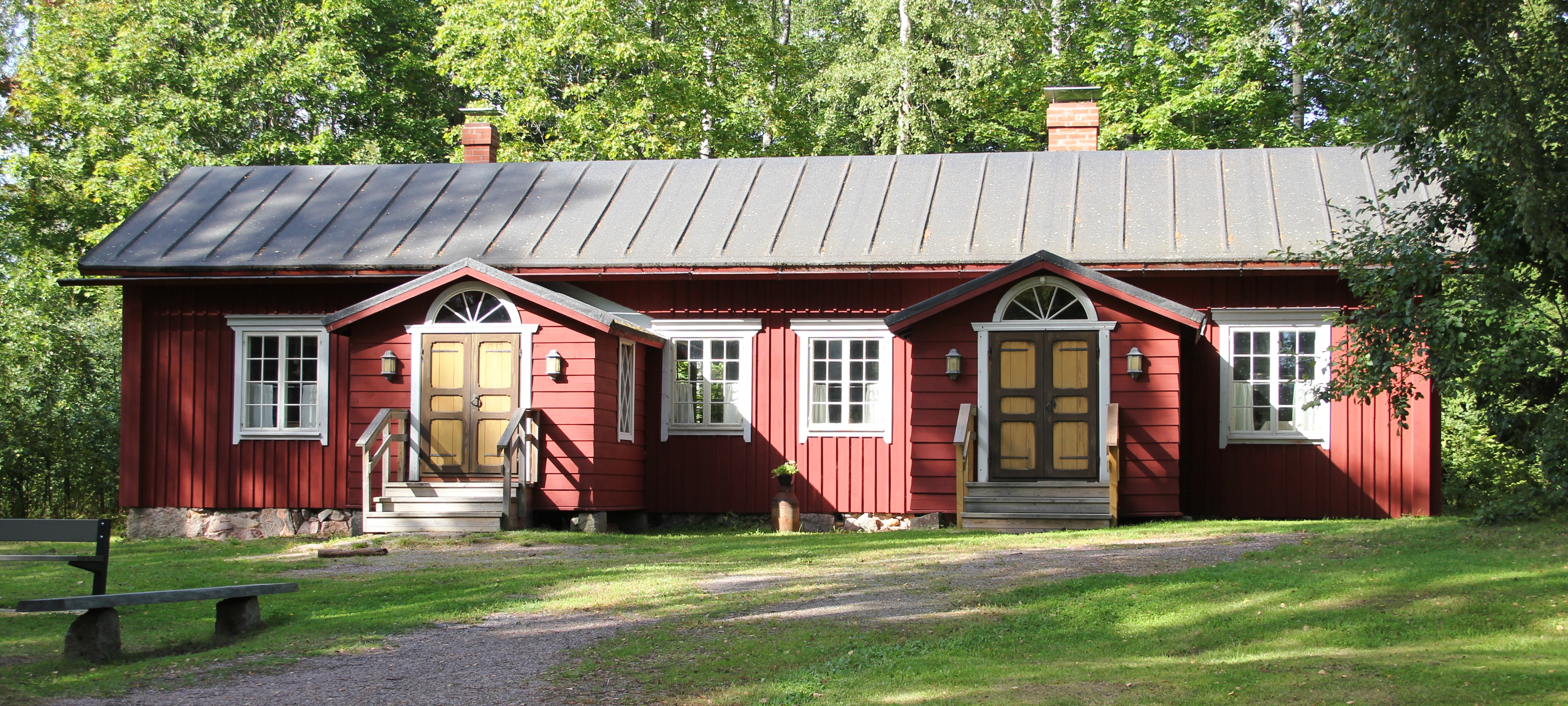
Fanjunkars museum.

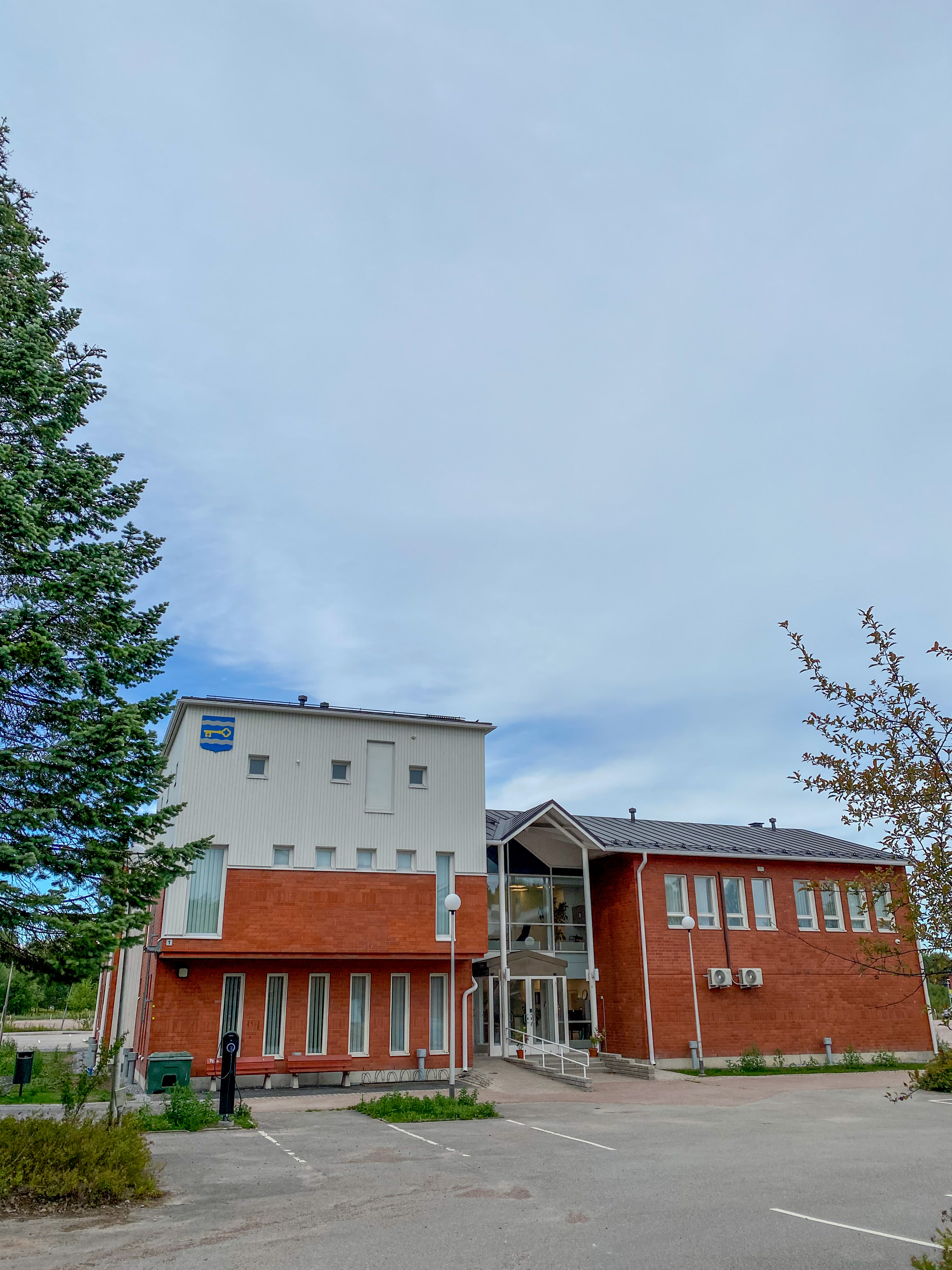
Siuntio municipal hall.

== See also ==
- Siuntio Church Village
