= Pickala Manor =

Coordinates: 60°05′50″N 24°18′07″E

- Pickala gård
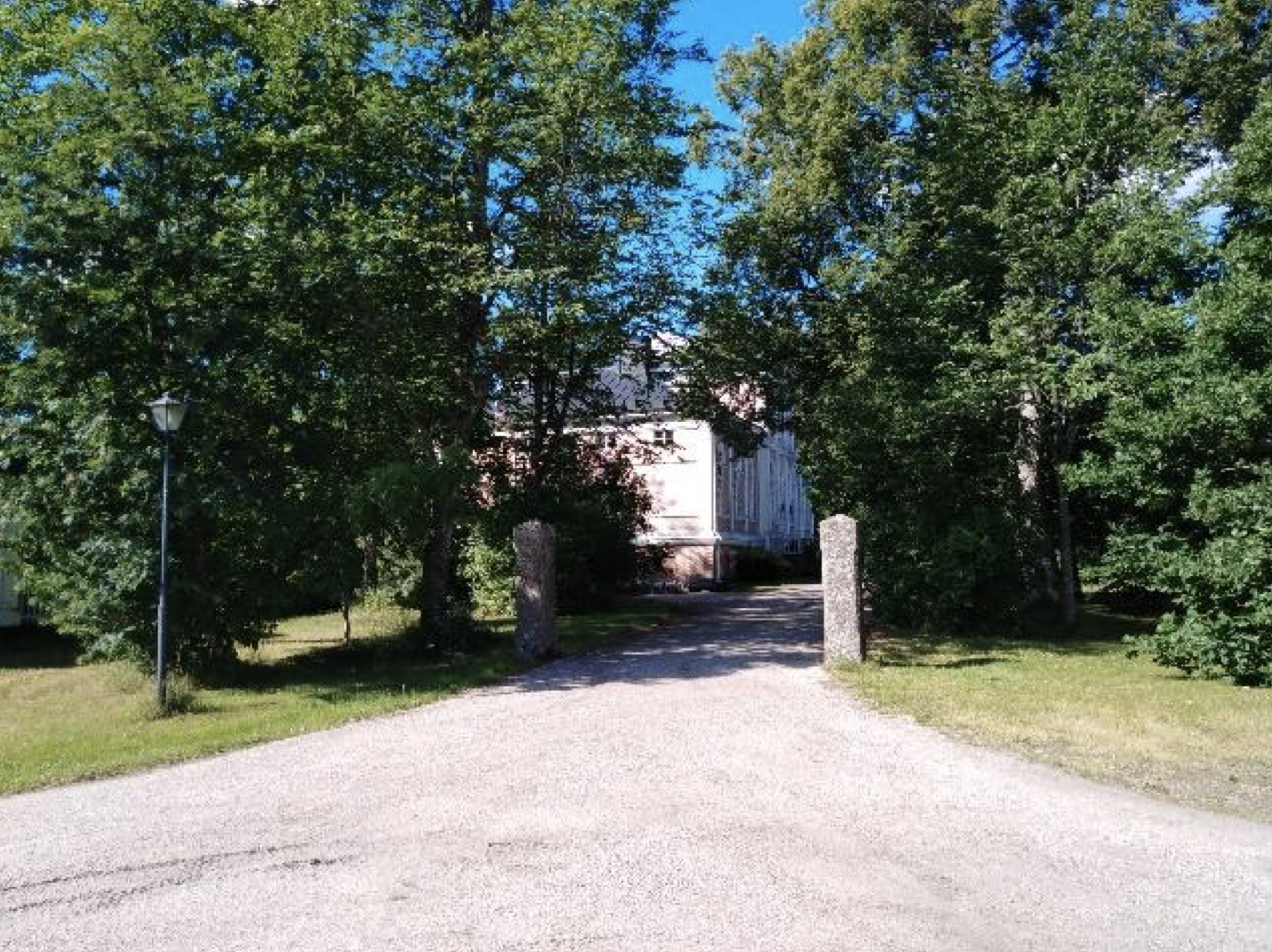
- Pickala Manor in 2019

General information
- Type: Manor House
- Architectural style: Empire style
- Location: Siuntio, Finland
- Completed: 1850
- Owner: Privately owned

Technical details
- Material: Stone

Design and construction
- Architect: A. F. Granstedt

Pickala Manor (Finnish: Pikkalan kartano, Swedish: Pickala gård) is a historical manor house in Siuntio in Finland. The current main building was built in 1850 according to architect A. F. Granstedt's blueprints. Pickala Manor is owned privately and acts as a private home. The historical manor house together with the surrounding land area builds a Significant Built Cultural Environment of State Interest and therefore the area is protected by law. Protection of the area is monitored by the Finnish Heritage Agency.

Pickala Manor has also acted as a set for two Finnish movies, The Snow Queen (Finnish: Lumikuningatar) and Onnelliset leikit.

== History ==
Pickala Manor was established originally in 1590 by the noble family Fleming, the owners of nearby Suitia Manor. Before the 1660s the manor house was situated a bit father away from where it is now located. Pickala Manor was separated from the lands of Suitia Manor in 1815 and annexed to the lands of Sjundby Manor. In the end of the 19th century Pickala became an independent estate of its own.

The historical King's Road between Turku and Vyborg passes Pickala on the northern side of the manor. The Flemings of Suitia Manor founded a port by the Baltic Sea near Pickala Manor. This port was situated by the mouth of river Pikkalanjoki.

=== Main building ===
Pickala Manor's main building is located in the end of a small sand avenue with a line of trees running along each side. The current main building in empire style was built by general A. F. Silfverhjelm, who then owned the manor house, in 1850. Blueprints were made by architect A. F. Granstedt. General Silfverhjelm built also a large stone cow house. The courtyard consist also of a bakery cottage from the 1700s, inspector's house from the 1800s and a stall in art nouveau style from 1913.

The garden and park area of Pickala Manor has remained almost unchanged since 1872.

=== Soviet rental era ===
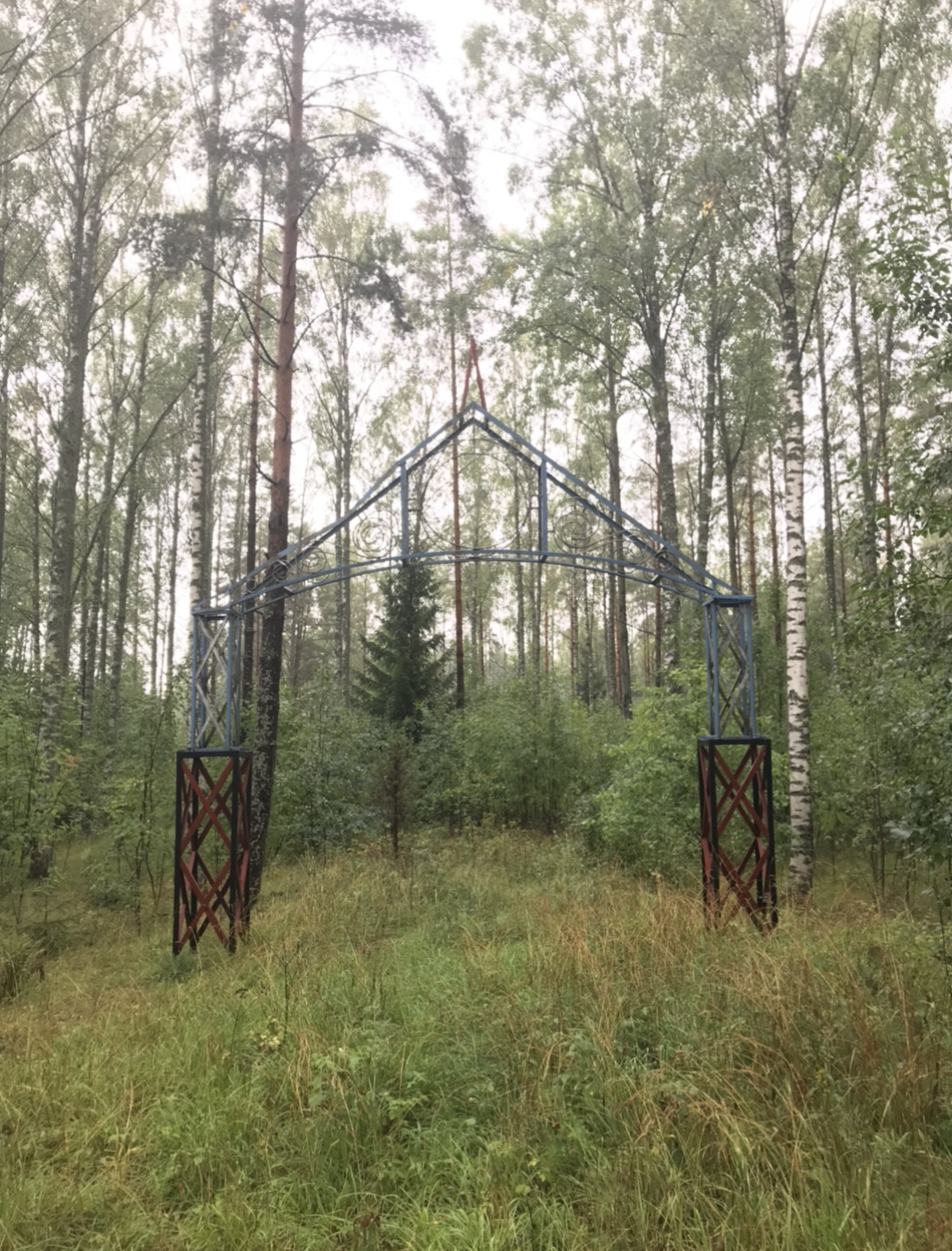
Soviet triumphal arch near Pickala Manor.

After the Second World War the area of Porkkala Naval Base was rented for the Soviet Union. Parts of municipalities of Siuntio, Kirkkonummi, Ingå and Degerby were left on the Soviet side of the border and people had to evacuate their homes. Also Pickala Manor was part of the rental area and the main building was used as a home for 20 families, judged by the amount of stoves that had been built inside. After Porkkala Naval Base was returned to Finland also Pickala was returned to its rightful owners. Soviet era had left its marks and the manor house was in need of extensive reparation.

A cobblestone road, a so-called Kabanov's artillery road, leads to Pickala Manor. This road was built by Soviet troops to make it better support the weight of heavy armoured military vehicles. A Soviet triumphal arch has been preserved by this road. There used to be more of these triumphal arches across the rental area but only the one in Pickala has survived. Many monuments built by Soviet soldiers were torn down after the area was returned to Finland and people were able to return to their homes.

== Images ==
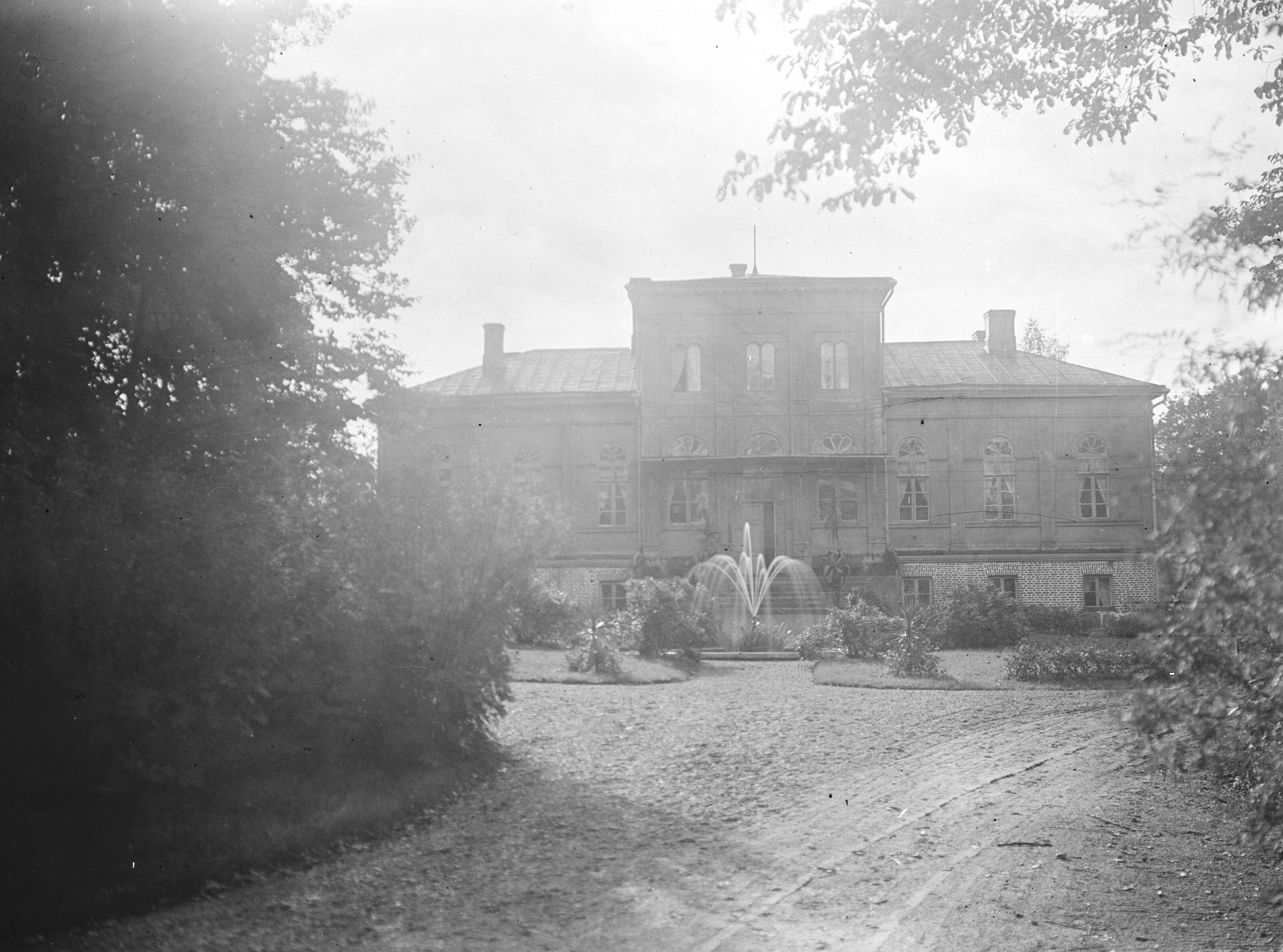
Pickala Manor in 1912.

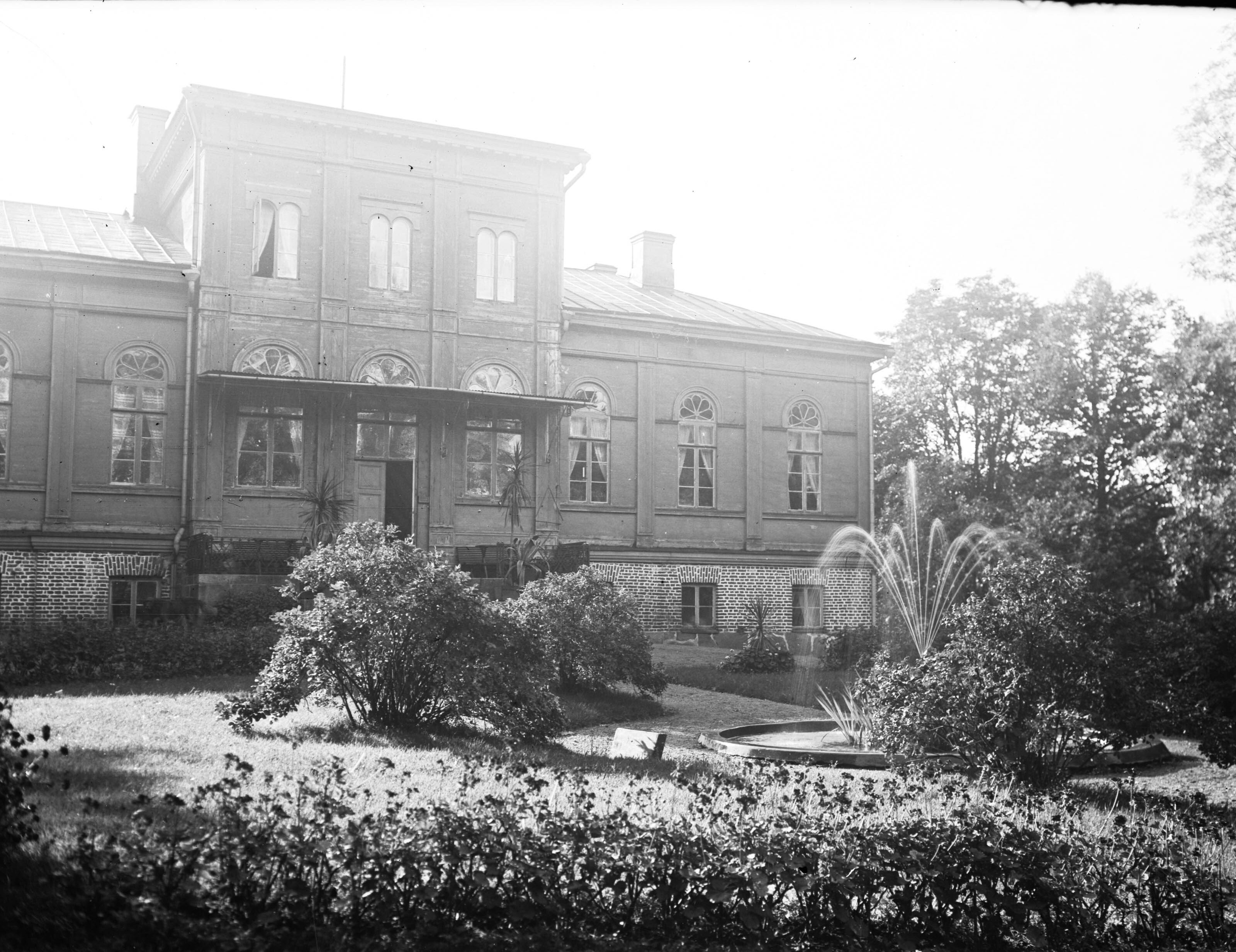
Pickala manor, the northern facade in 1912.

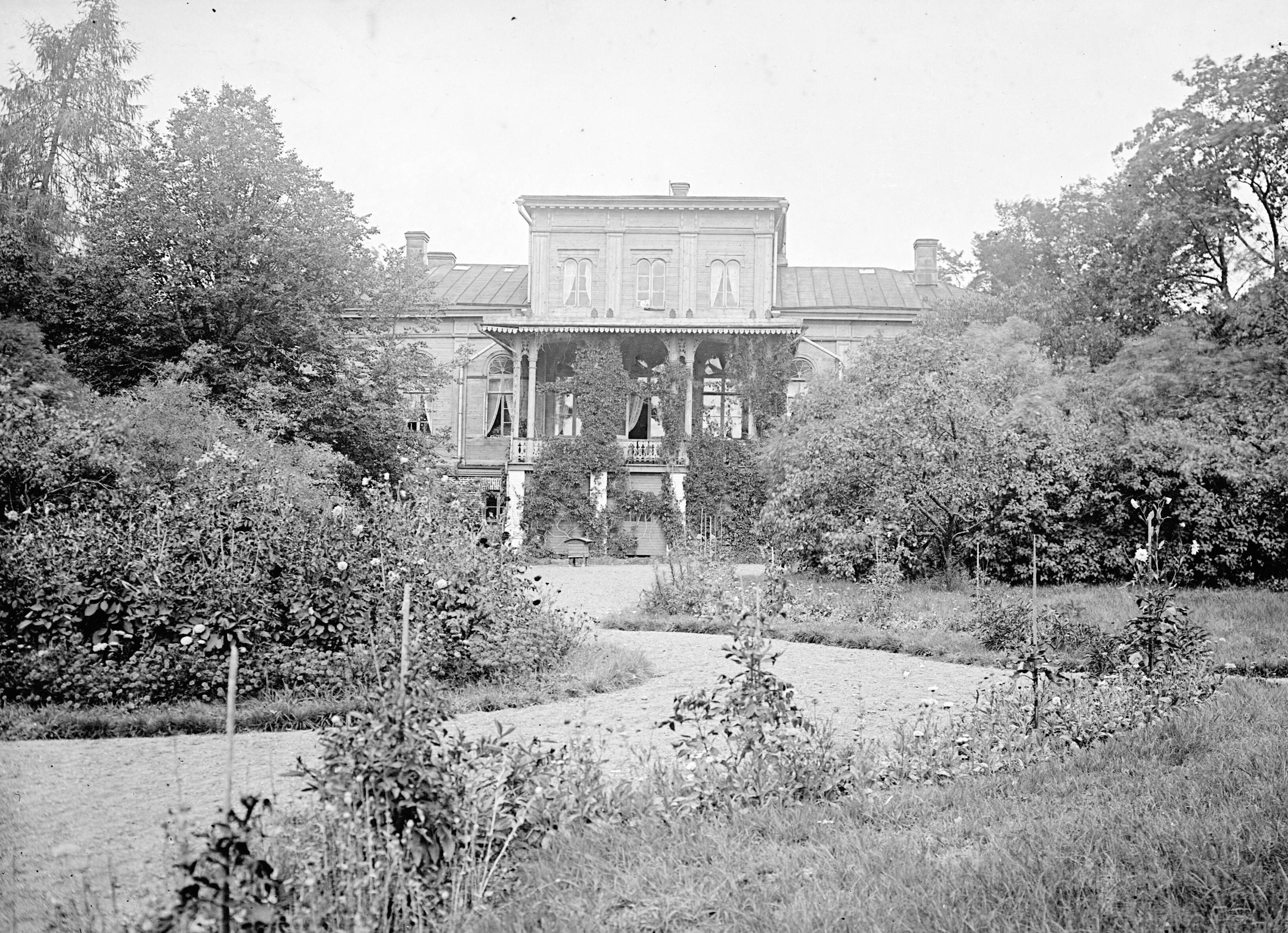
Pickala Manor and garden in 1912.
