= Sjundby Manor =

Coordinates: 60.1412°N 24.2646°E

- Sjundby slott
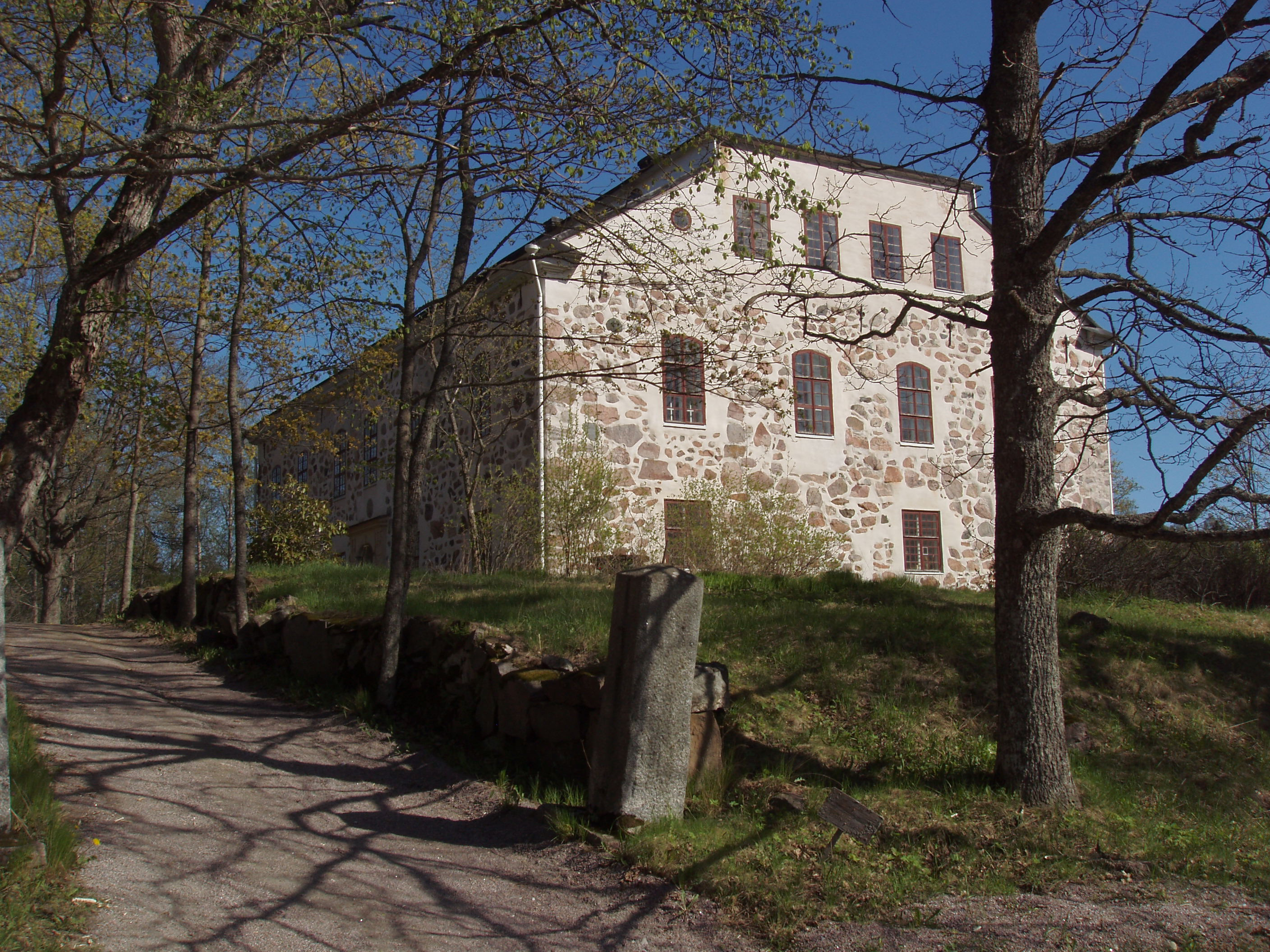
- Sjundby manor in 2008
- Interactive map of the Sjundby Manor area

General information
- Type: Manor house
- Location: Siuntio, Finland
- Completed: 16th century
- Owner: Adlercreutz family

Website
- https://www.sjundby.fi/

Sjundby Manor (Finnish: Sjundbyn kartano, Swedish: Sjundby slott) is a manor house in Siuntio in Finland. The history of the manor is known from the year 1417.

During the 1560s king Gustav I of Sweden's master of horses, Jakob Henriksson, built the main building out of gray stone that we see today. Sjundby Manor has been owned by many noble families throughout its history. The most well-known owner of the estate was princess Sigrid of Sweden, the daughter of Eric XIV of Sweden and Karin Månsdotter. The noble family of Adlercreutz has owned Sjundby Manor continuously since the 17th century. The ownership was only briefly disrupted by the lease of Porkkala Naval Base area to the Soviet Union after the Second World War. After the Soviet occupation the main building had to undergo a massive renovation.

Nowadays Sjundby Manor serves as a private home. It is one of the oldest inhabited buildings in Finland. Sjundby is listed as a Built cultural heritage site of national significance and therefore protected by law.

== History ==
=== 15th and 16th centuries ===
In 1417 a man called Lasse Skytte is named as the owner of Sjundby manor in written records.

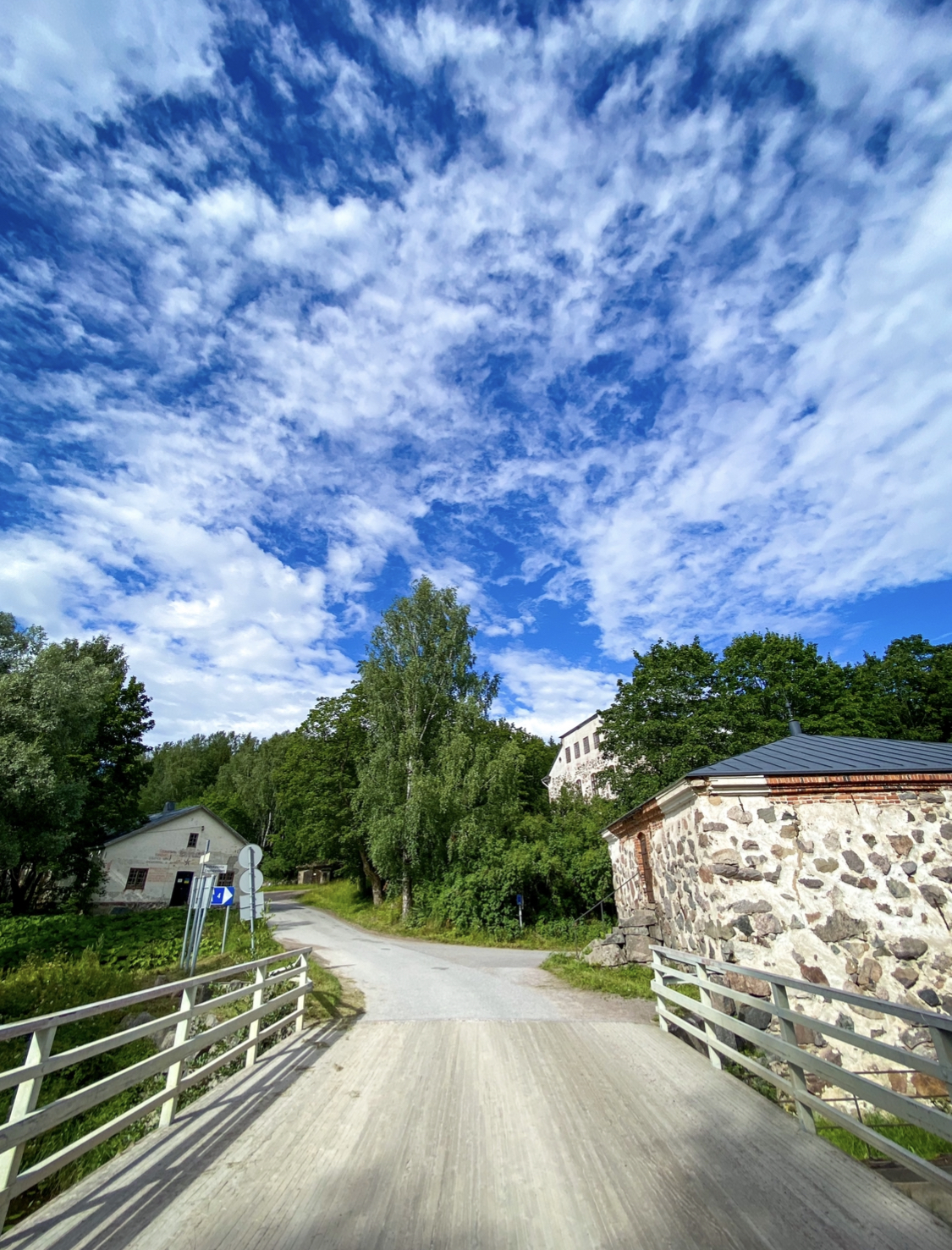
Bridge over river Sjundbyån. Sjundby manor with storage buildings in 2022.

The next time Sjundby manor is mentioned in written records is in the mid-1500s when Jakob Henriksson Hästesko is named as the owner of the estate. Under his time the estate gained land and the main building, which resembles a medieval castle, was built. King Gustav I of Sweden visited Sjundby on 1 December 1555. He was impressed by the greatness of the manor house and made it into a Kungsgård by the year 1556. The newly established county of Sjundbygård included the areas of what is nowadays known as municipalities of Siuntio, Kirkkonummi, Ingå and Espoo. However the county wasn't a long-lasting one. Already in 1558 county of Raseborg overtook Sjundbygård.

=== 17th century ===
Princess Sigrid of Sweden arrived to Sjundby in 1603. Not a lot of information has been left behind of her time at the manor house but it is known that her mother, Karin Månsdotter, visited Sjundby. Therefore, a room inside the main building was named in her honour. Princess Sigrid returned to Western Sweden, as Finland was then the eastern part of the country, when she was married to Henrik Tott. In 1618 the ownership of Sjundby was transferred to princess Sigrid's son Åke Tott who gained fame as a soldier. He was later appointed privy councillor.

In December 1660 baron Ernst Johan Creutz bought Sjundby from Tott. He renovated the manor house and founded a new garden. Creutz was buried in St. Peter's church in Siuntio and you can still see his coat of arms hanging on a wall inside the church.

=== 18th century ===
At the end of the 17th century Tomas Teuterström bought Sjundby. Teuterström was knighted by the king of Sweden and his last name was changed to Adlercreutz. This was the start of the Adlercreutz family's ownership of Sjundby that has lasted over 300 years.

During the Great Wrath Sjundby was badly damaged. For example, fireplaces and windows were destroyed when the manor house was robbed of all movables. Also St. Peter's Church in Siuntio was greatly damaged and therefore services were held at Sjundby for a while.

After the Treaty of Nystad in 1721 the new owner of Sjundby, Helena Adlercreutz, started to renovate Sjundby. The renovation was hardly finished when Sjundby caught fire which ended up destroying the whole roof of the manor on 1 May 1723.

=== 19th century ===
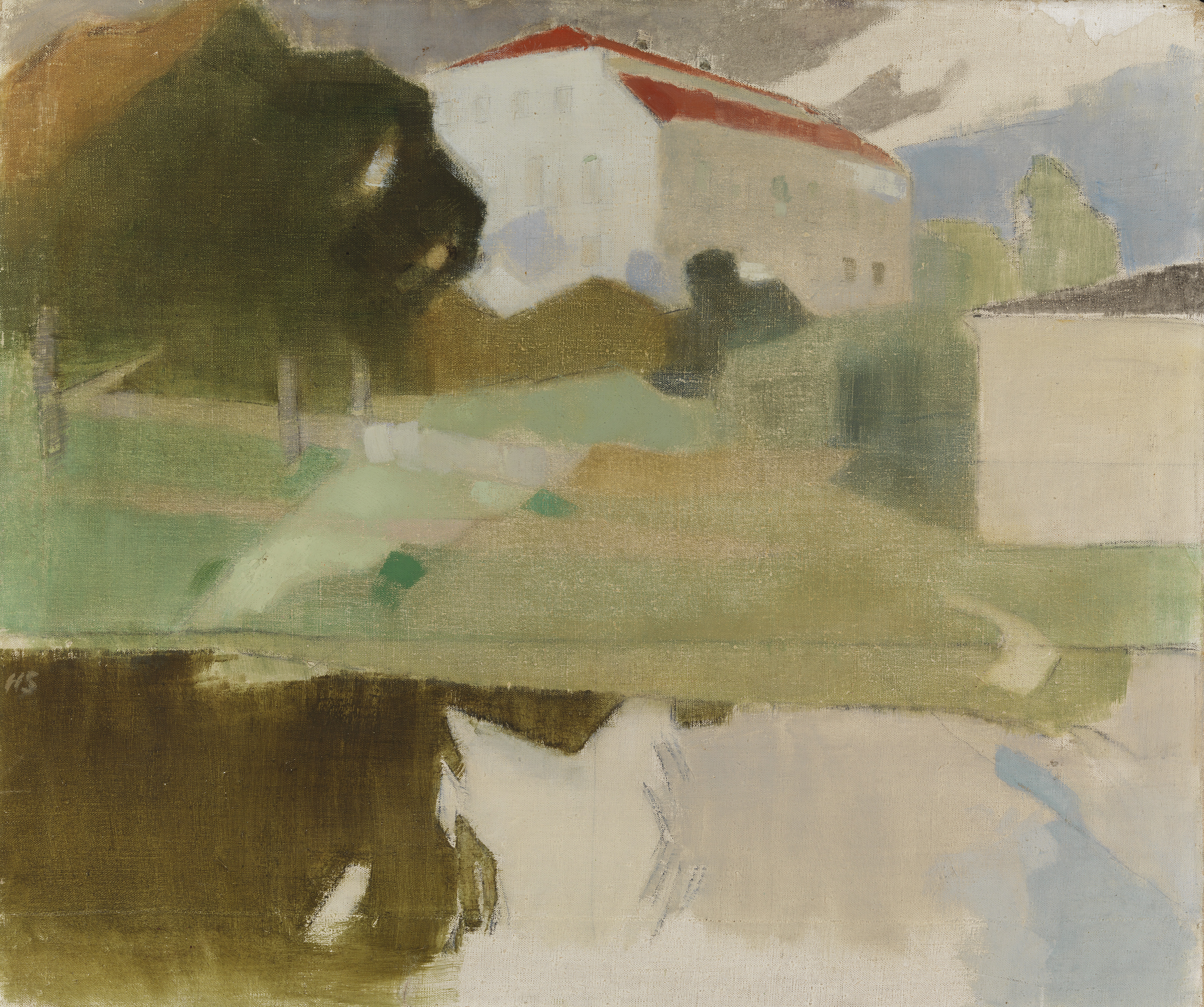
Sjundby in Schjerfbeck's painting from 1927.

During the 19th century after the Finnish War between 1808–1809 Sweden loses the area of Finland to Russia. The Grand Duchy of Finland gets a strong autonomy in the Russian empire and life at Sjundby goes on. An observation tower designed by painter Helene Schjerfbeck's brother Magnus Schjerfbeck is built on the grounds of Sjundby in 1892. At that time Sjundby was owned by Tomas Adlercreutz, Helene Schjerfbeck's godfather. Schjerfbeck has painted various landscapes depicting Sjundby, such as The Old Manor House (1901) and Sjundby Manor (1927). Additionally her earliest sketchbooks have drawings depicting life in Sjundby.

During the 19th century Aldercreutzes of Sjundby had an own ship called Vänskapen (English: friendship). The family sailed from Sjundby for example to Helsinki, St. Petersburg, Stockholm and even Spanish coastal towns.

=== 20th century ===
During the early 20th century almost 500 people worked for Sjundby Manor. After the building of coastal railway between Helsinki and Turku even Sjundby got an own station at Vik. Railway traffic quickly replaced steam ship traffic to the manor.

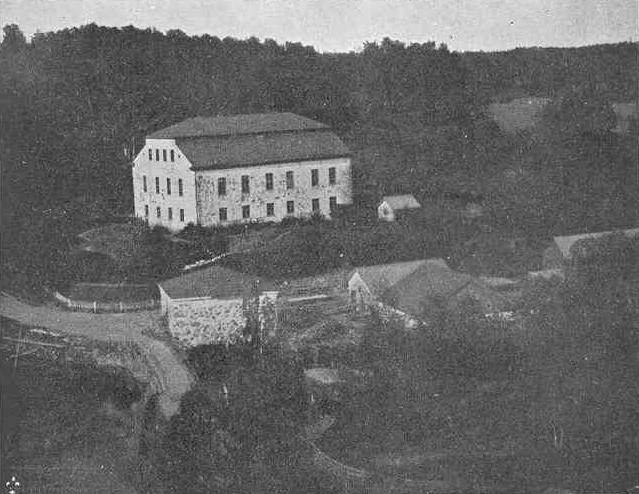
Sjundby around year 1900

During the Finnish Civil War in 1918 the supporters of Red Finland briefly occupied Sjundby until the manor was liberated by the German troops.

Many families escaped to the grounds of Sjundby from Helsinki during the Second World War when Helsinki was bombed. Parts of the collections of the National Museum of Finland, the National Archives of Finland and Helsinki University Archives were evacuated to Sjundby and stored in the medieval stone cellars of the manor house. After the Second World War Porkkala Naval Base was rented to Soviet Union. This rental area included much of Siuntio and the whole area of Sjundby forcing the Adlercreutz family to evacuate their home together with many other families. During the rental time Sjundby served as Soviet army officers base. Porkkala was returned to Finland on 26 January 1956 and after the Finnish Defence Forces had inspected the area people were able to return to their homes. Huge damages were waiting for Adlercreutz family at Sjundby. For example, fireplaces had been destroyed and holes had been made to the wooden floor which had then been used as toilets.

=== 21st century ===
Nowadays Sjundby manor is still serving as a private home. Guided tours are sometimes operated in parts of the manor house and its grounds during summer months.

== Images ==
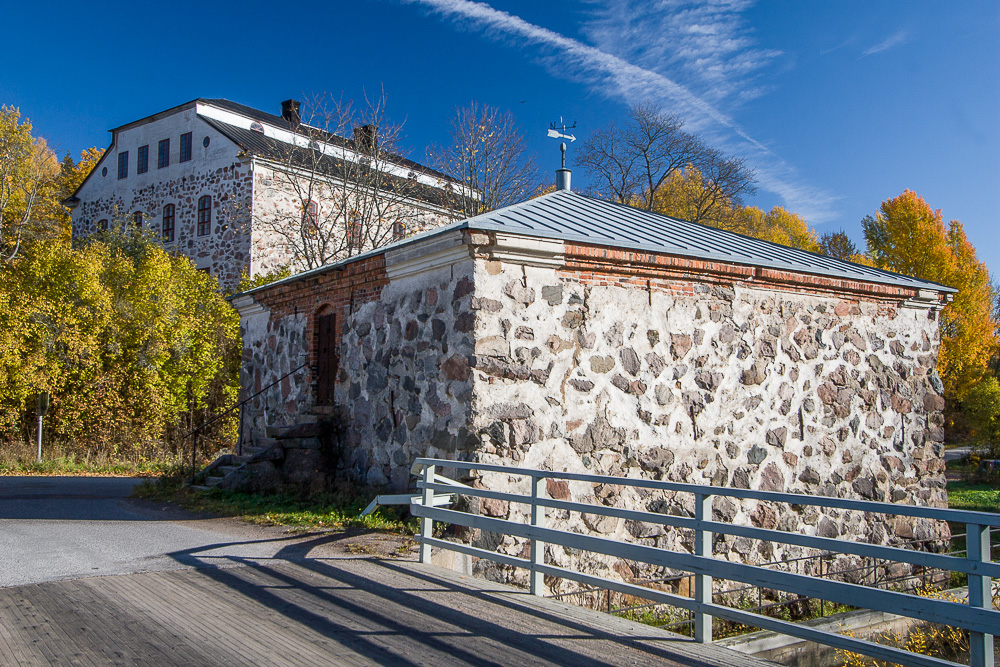
Sjundby Manor.

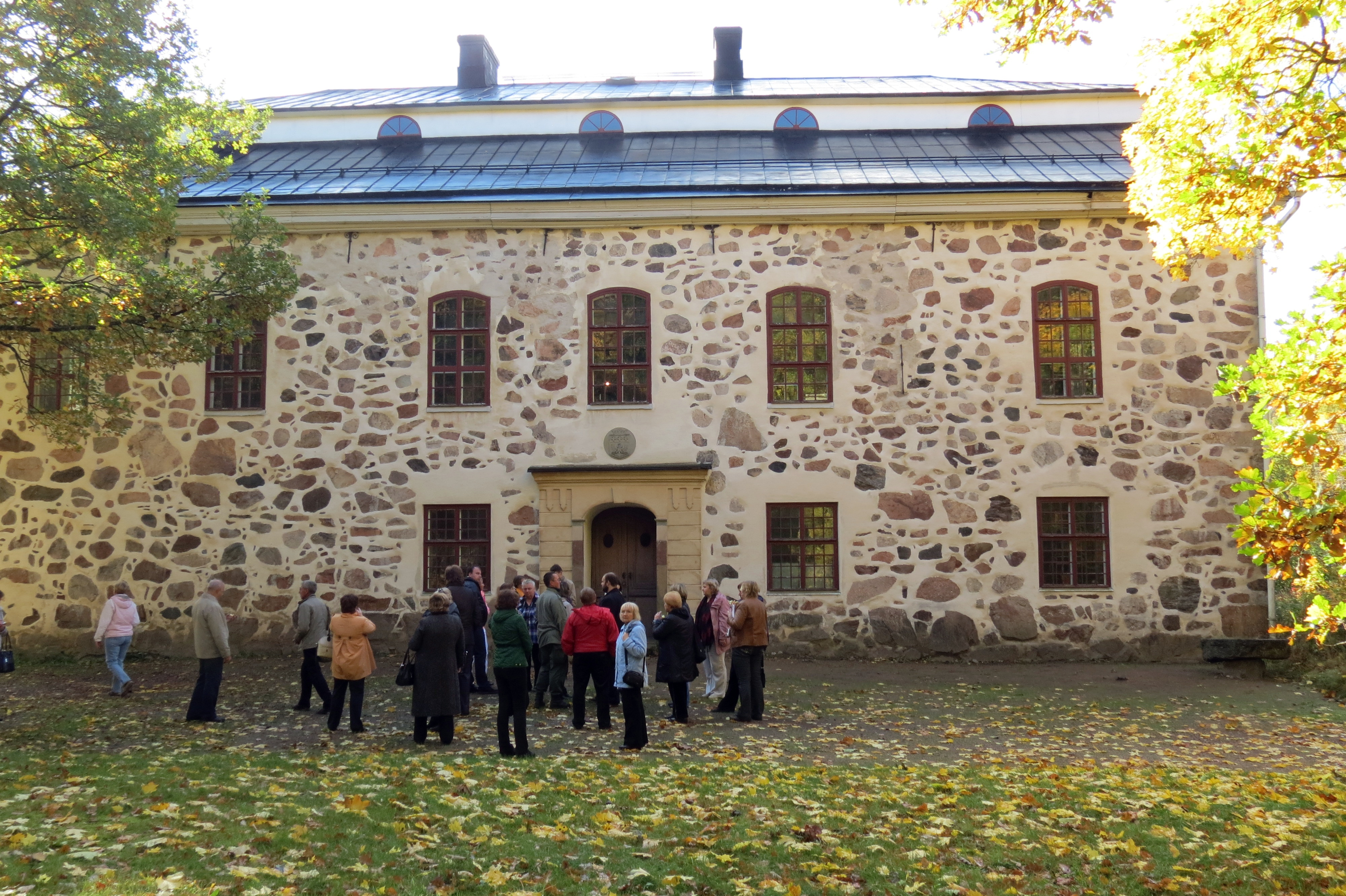
Main entrance to Sjundby manor.

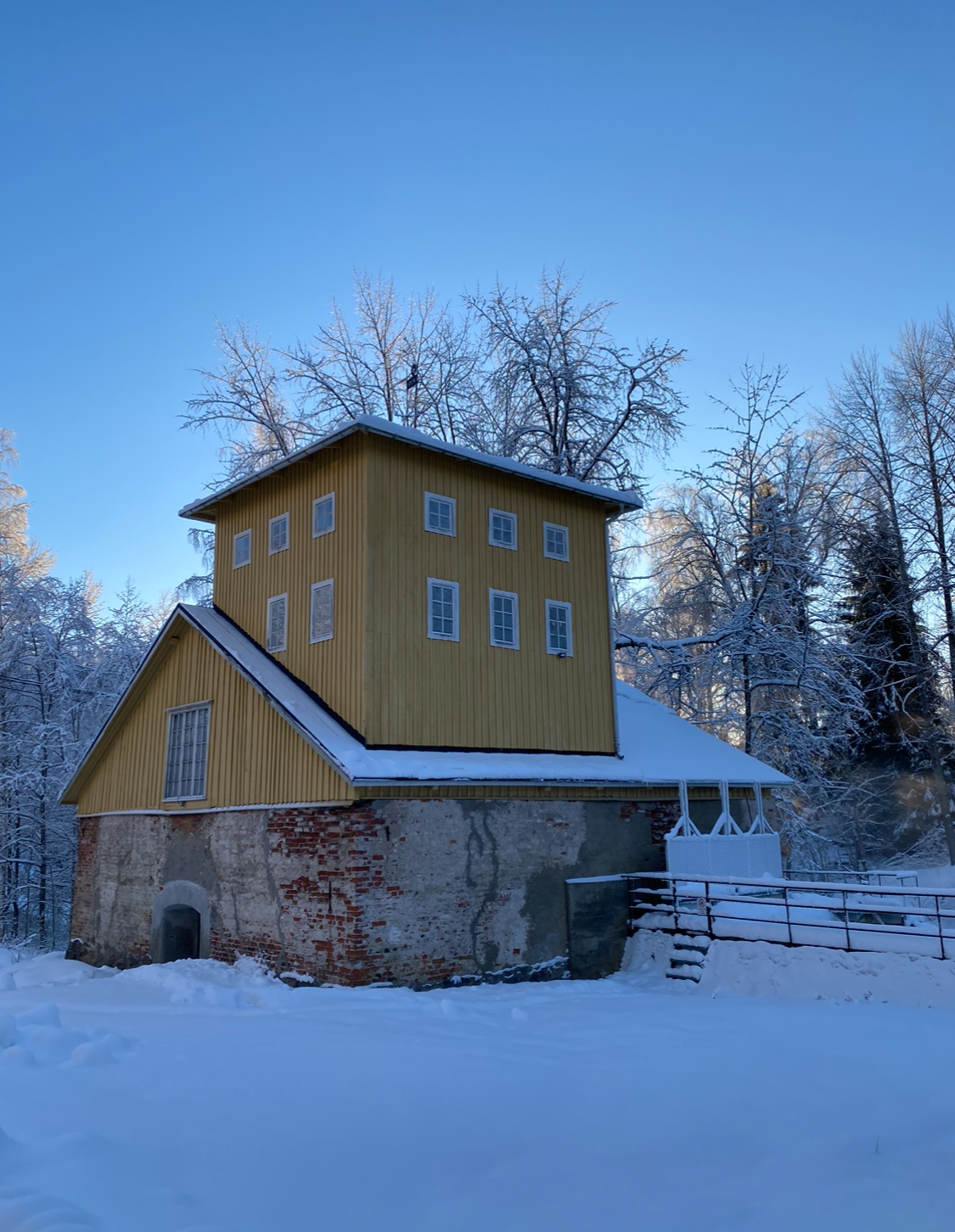
Sjundby mill in January 2024.

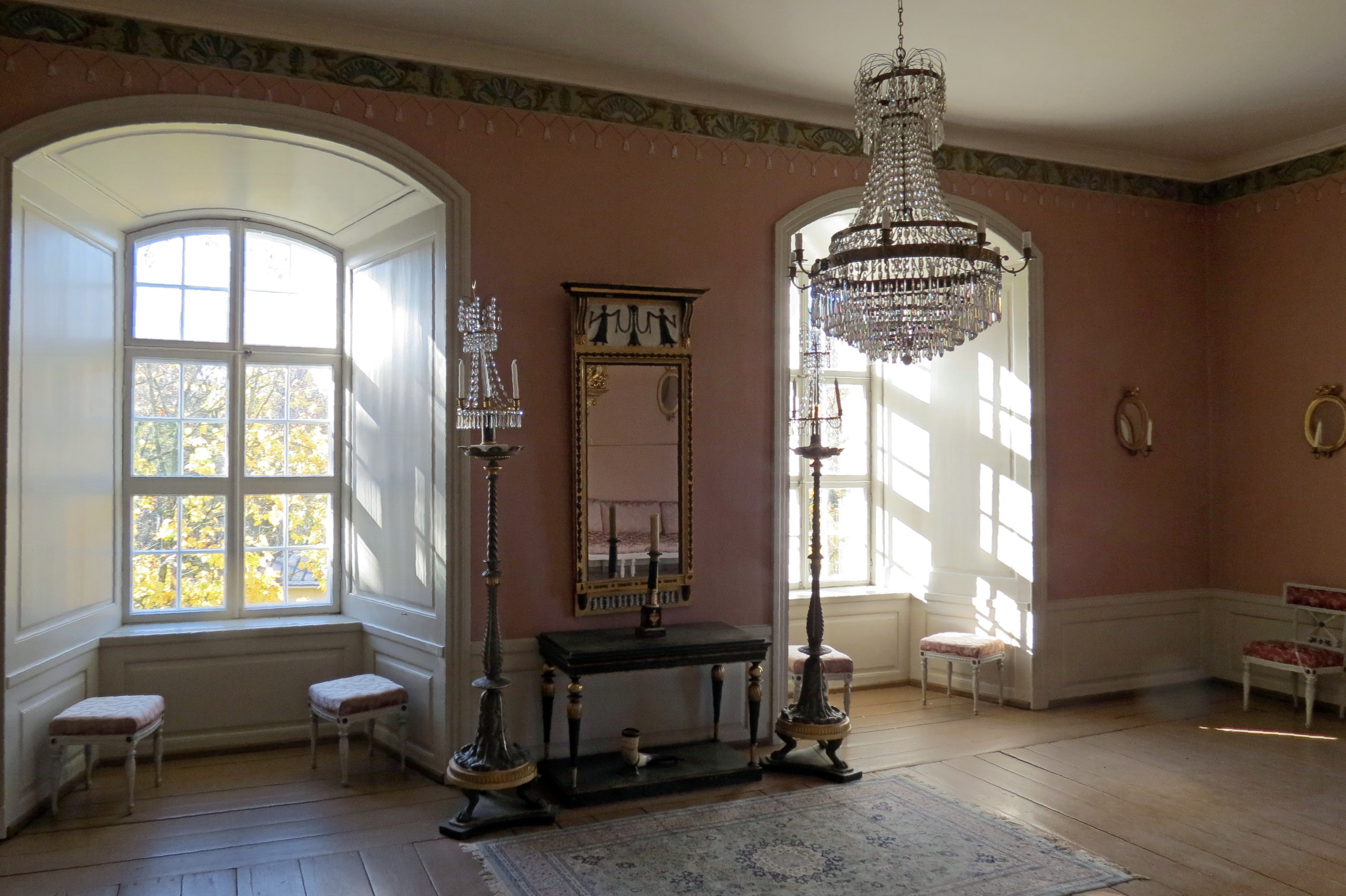
Hall in Sjundby manor

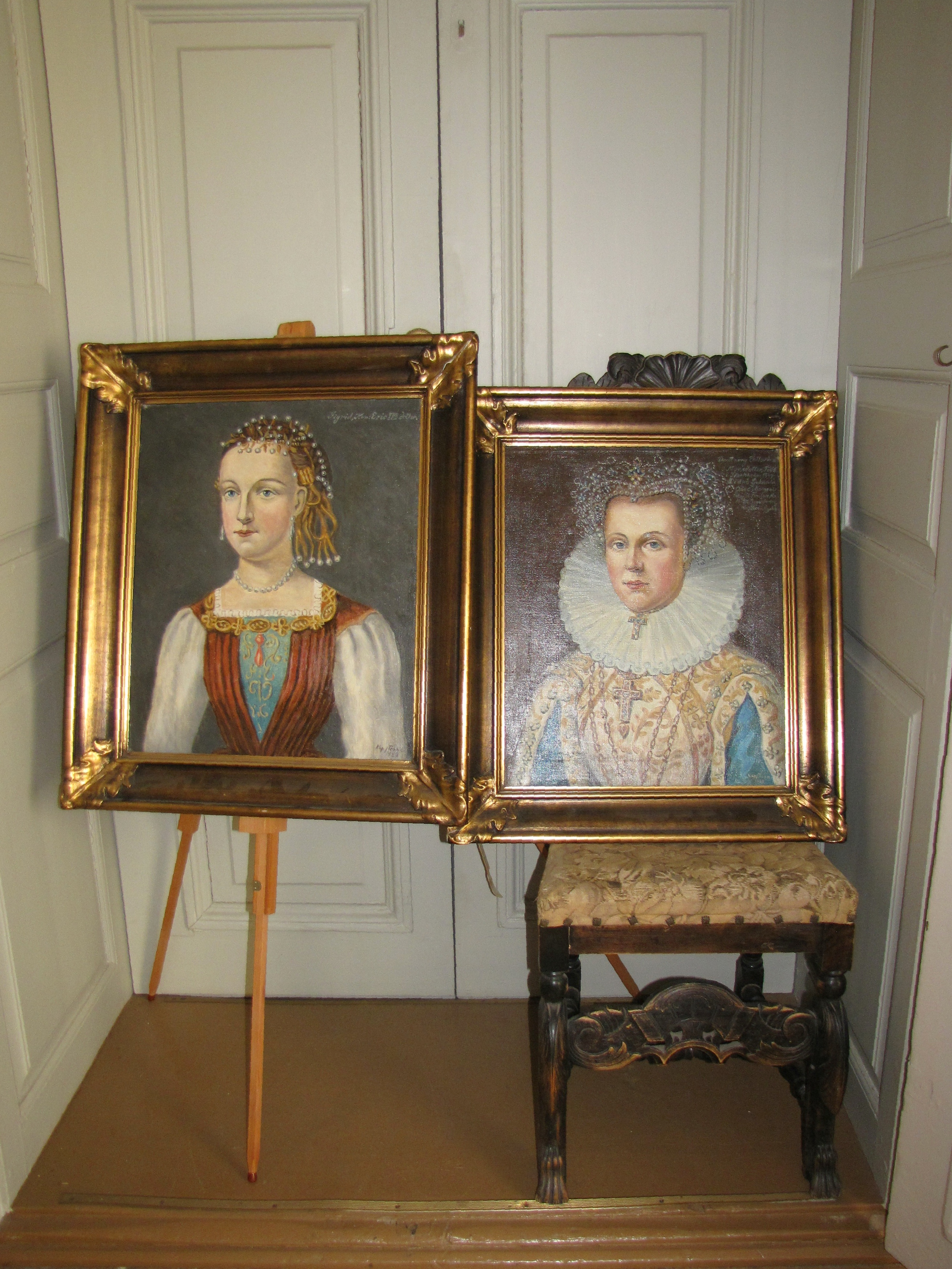
Portraits of princess Sigrid of Sweden and Karin Månsdotter in Sjundby.

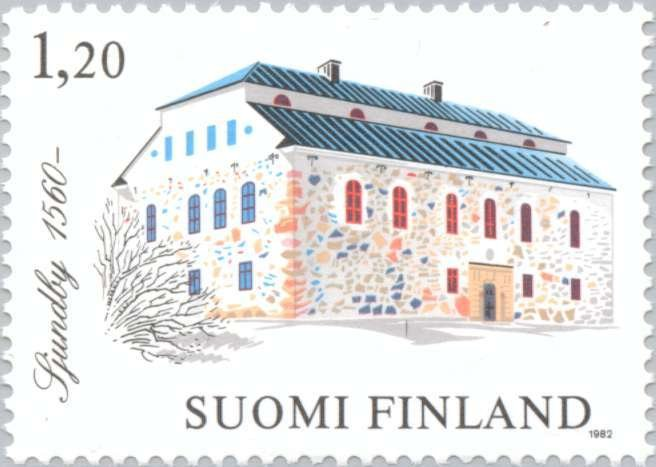
Stamp depicting Sjundby

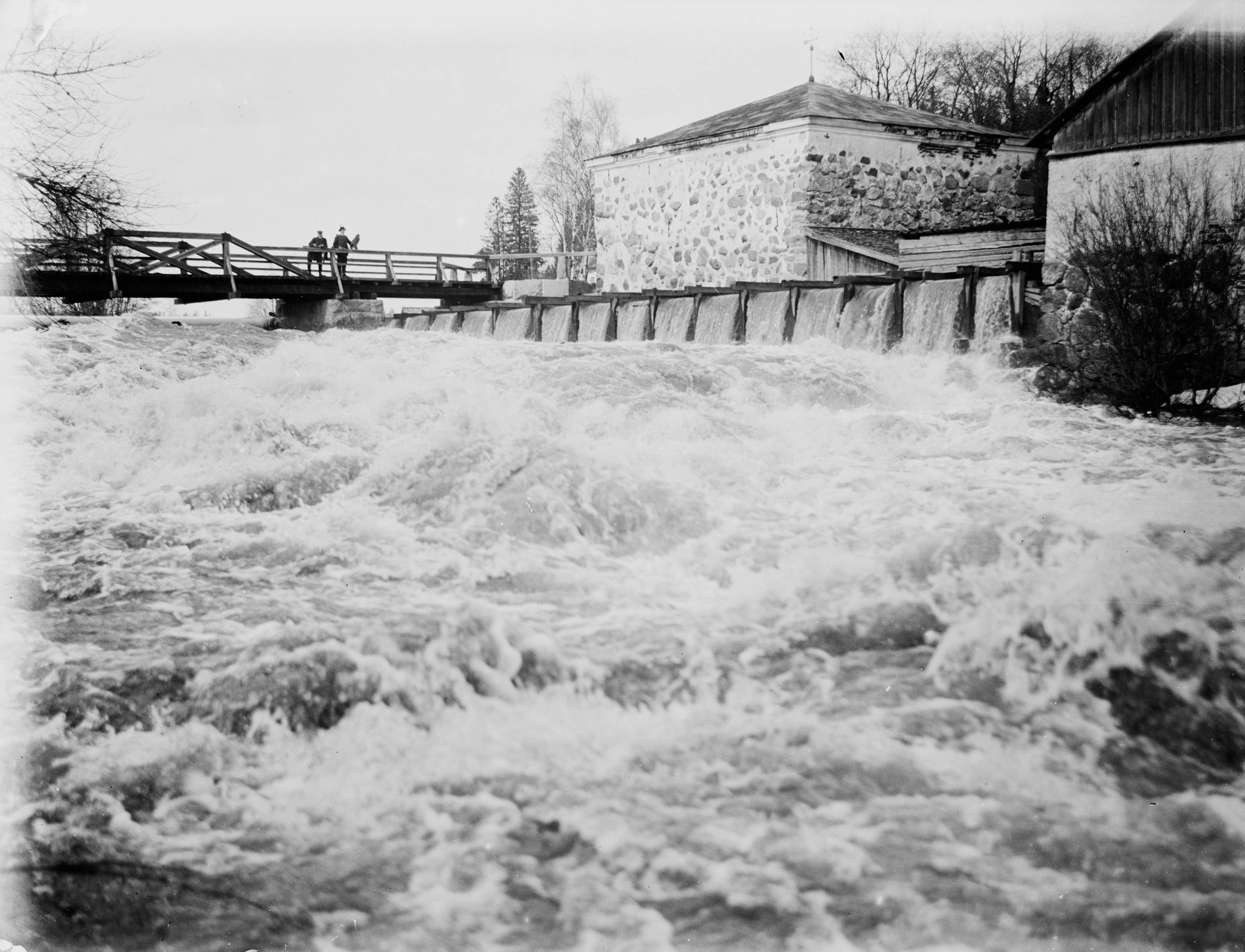
Sjundby rapids and bridge over river Sjundbyån in 1916

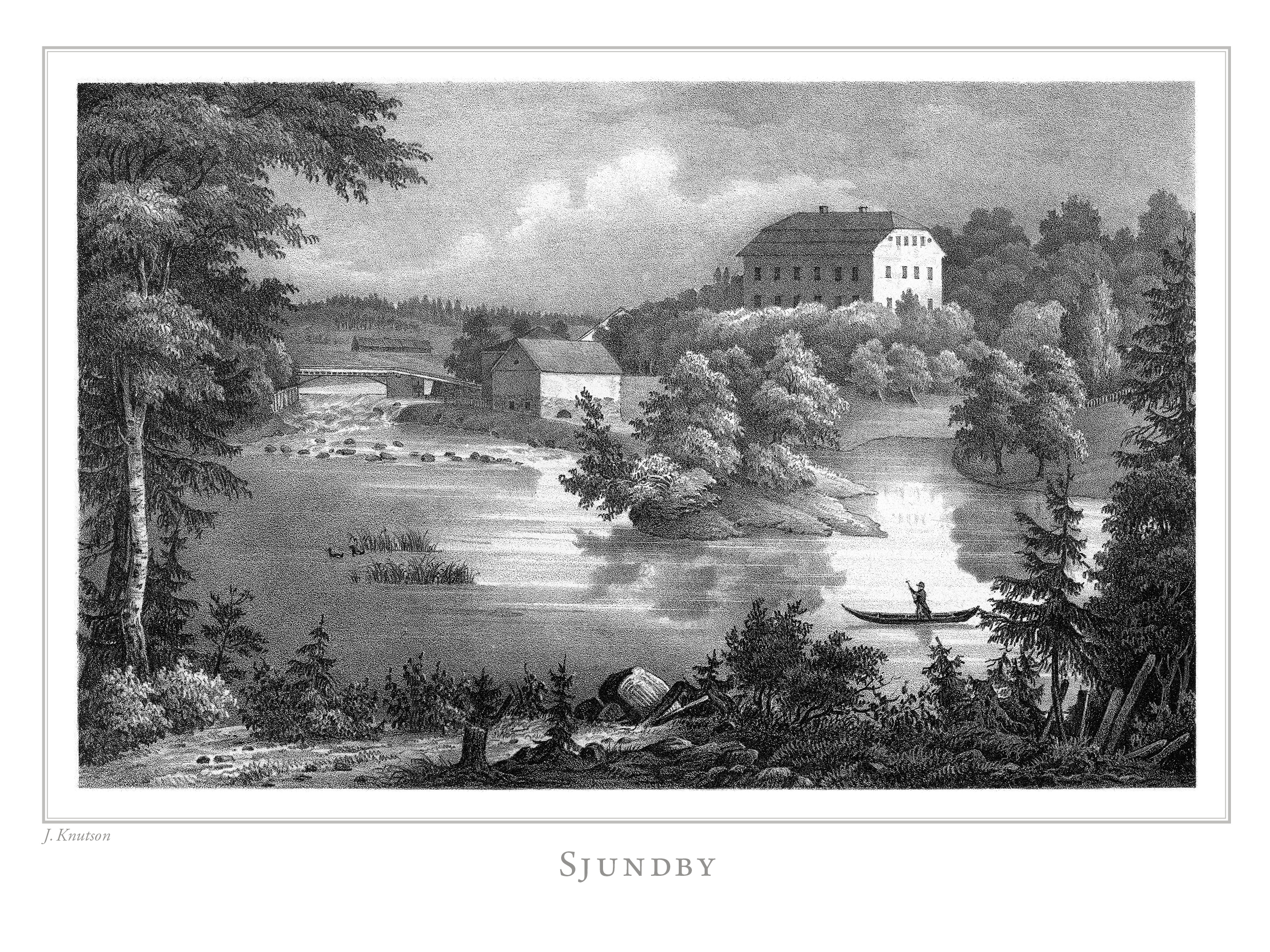
Illustration in Finland framstäldt i teckningar edited by Zacharias Topelius and published 1845-1852.

== Owners ==
List of owner families of Sjundby:

- Hästesko 1550–1570
- Tott 1570–1654
- Sparre 1654–1660
- Creutz 1660–1695
- von Löwe 1695–1698
- Adlercreutz 1698-
