= Skällberget =

Prehistoric hill fort in Uusimaa, Finland

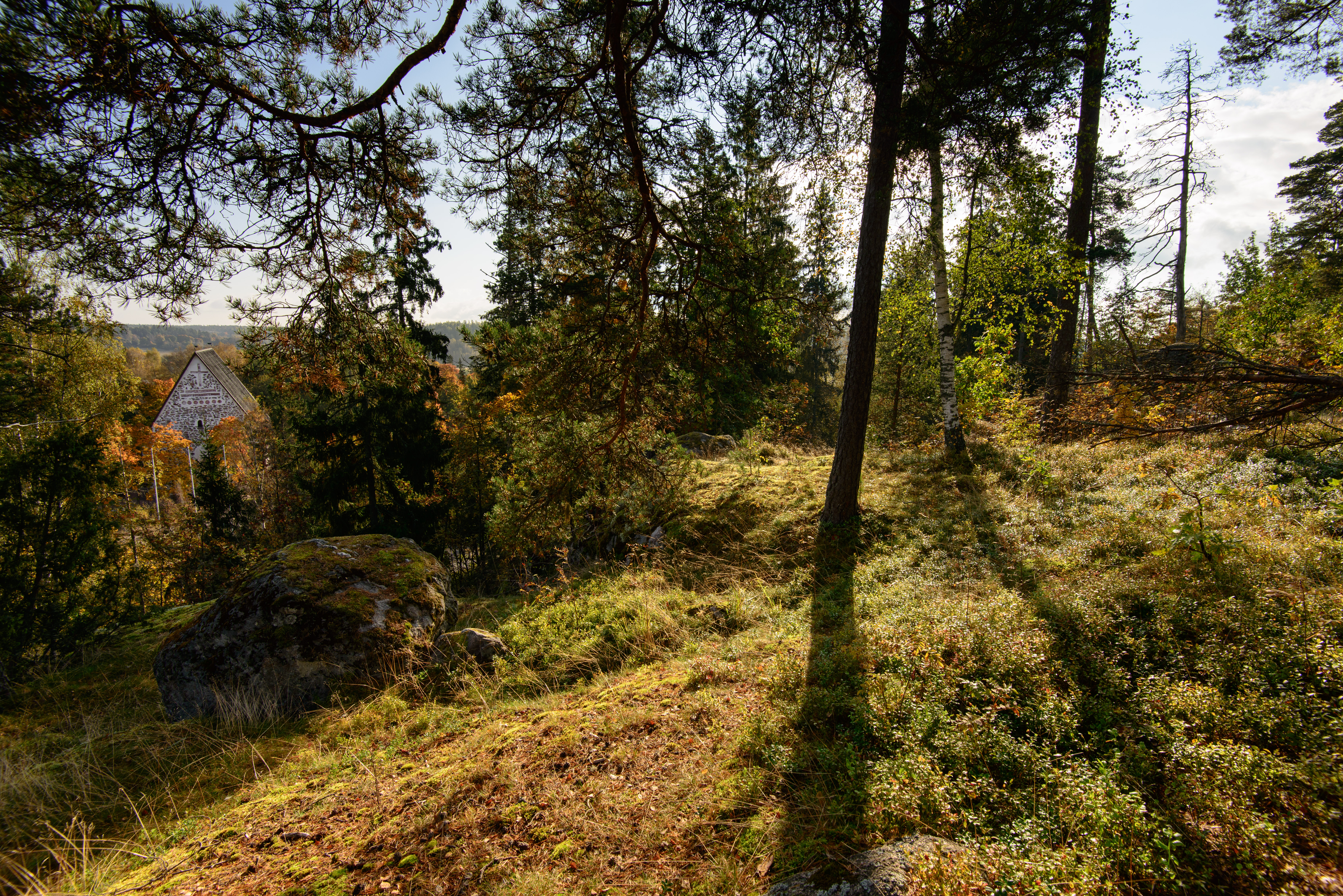
- Skällberget hill fort with St. Peter's Church in the background.
- Location: Finland Siuntio, Uusimaa, Finland
- Coordinates: 60.1771°N 24.2009°E
- Built: Late Iron Age / Early Middle Ages

Skällberget is a prehistoric hillfort in Siuntio in Uusimaa region, Finland. The archaeological site, located across the road from the medieval St. Peter's Church, is protected by law. A nature trail leads to the top of the hill.

== Description ==
The hillfort on top of Skällberget Hill was originally located by a waterway when it was constructed either during the late Iron Age or early Middle Ages. Due to the post-glacial rebound the shoreline of the Baltic Sea has moved further away from the area causing the hillfort not to be located by a sea shore anymore. The hillfort consists of a small area on top of Skällberget Hill with a protective wall built of stones and ground on the southern side of the hill. The eastern part of the hill consists of steep cliffs. No permanent structures, apart from the wall, have most likely existed on Skällberget. It is believed that the fort functions as a guard post or a refuge site in a case of an hostile attack to the area.

The hillfort has even a small burial site inside of it.

== Gallery ==
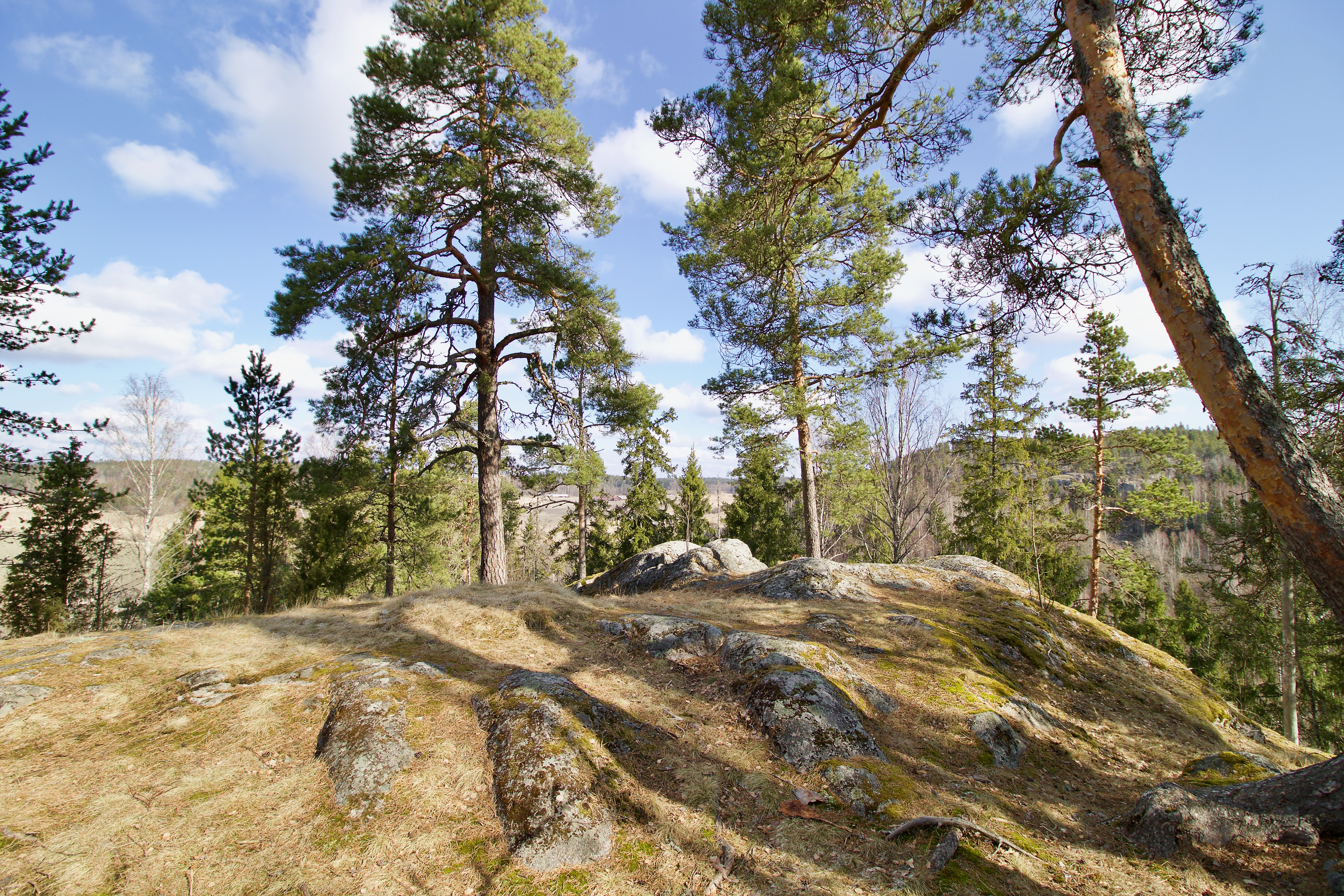
Top of the hillfort.

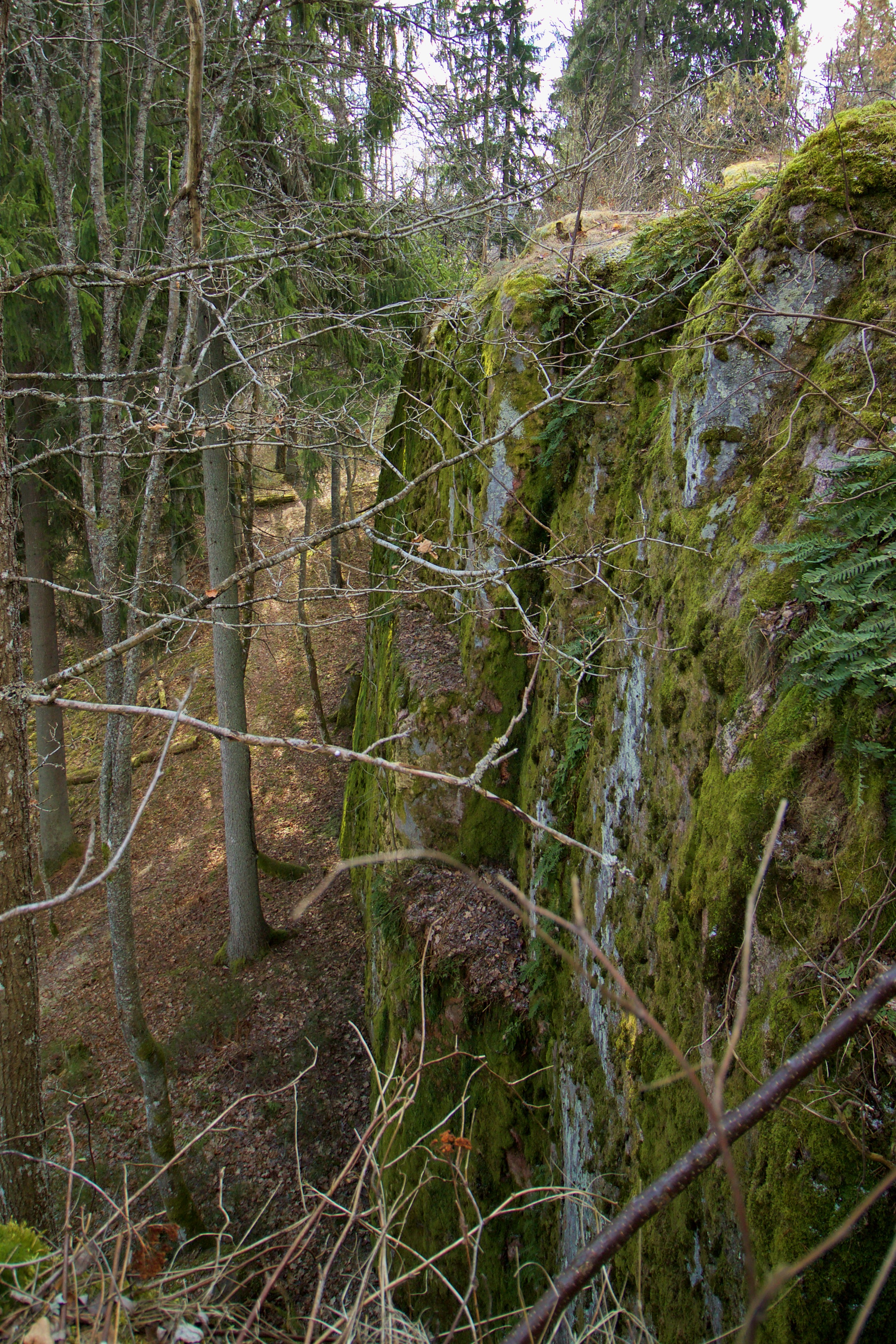
Eastern cliff of the hillfort.

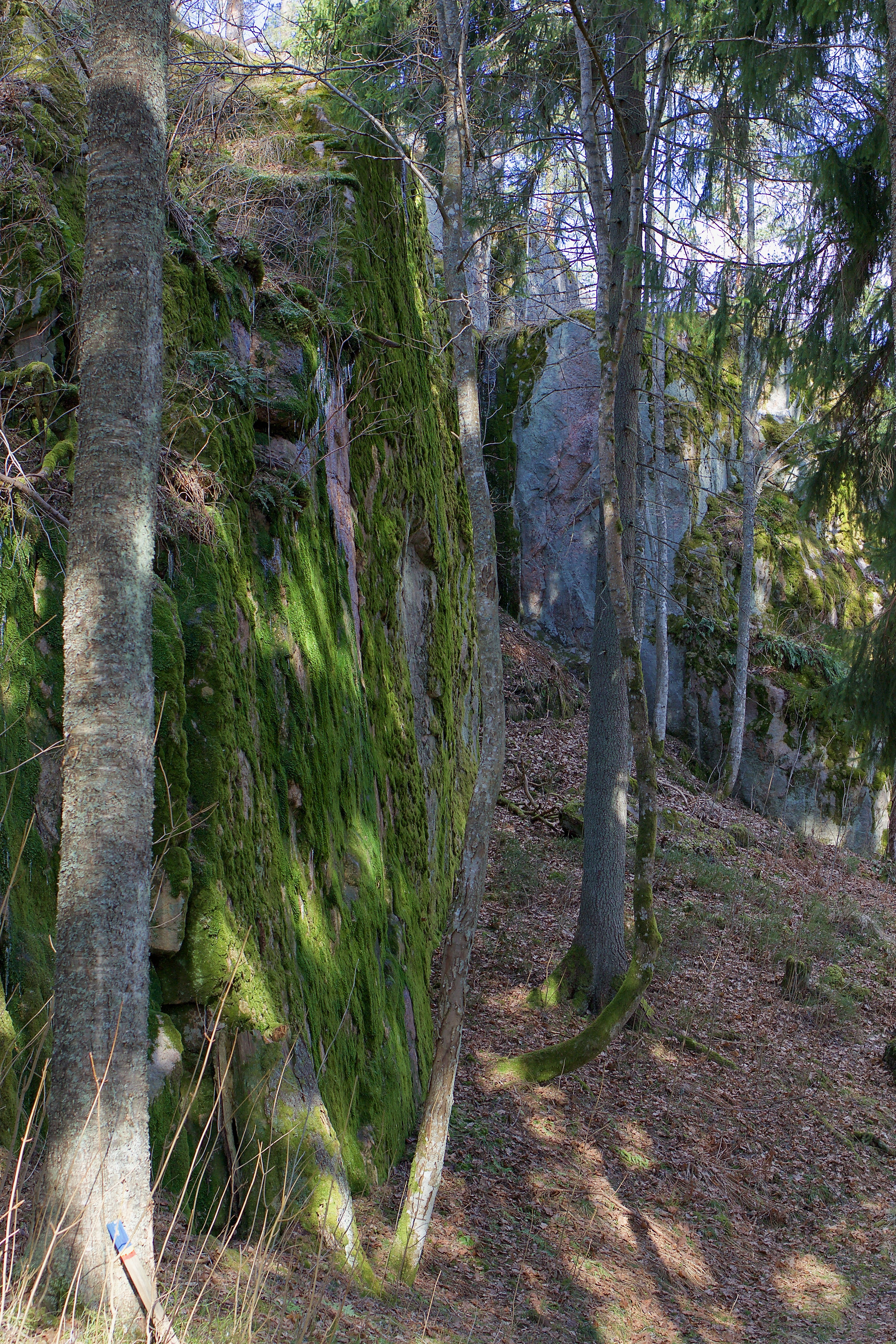
Eastern cliff of the hillfort.

== See also ==
- Krejansberget
- Ekeberga Burial Site
