= Krejansberget =

Cliff in Siuntio, Finland

Coordinates: 60.1796°N 24.2057°E

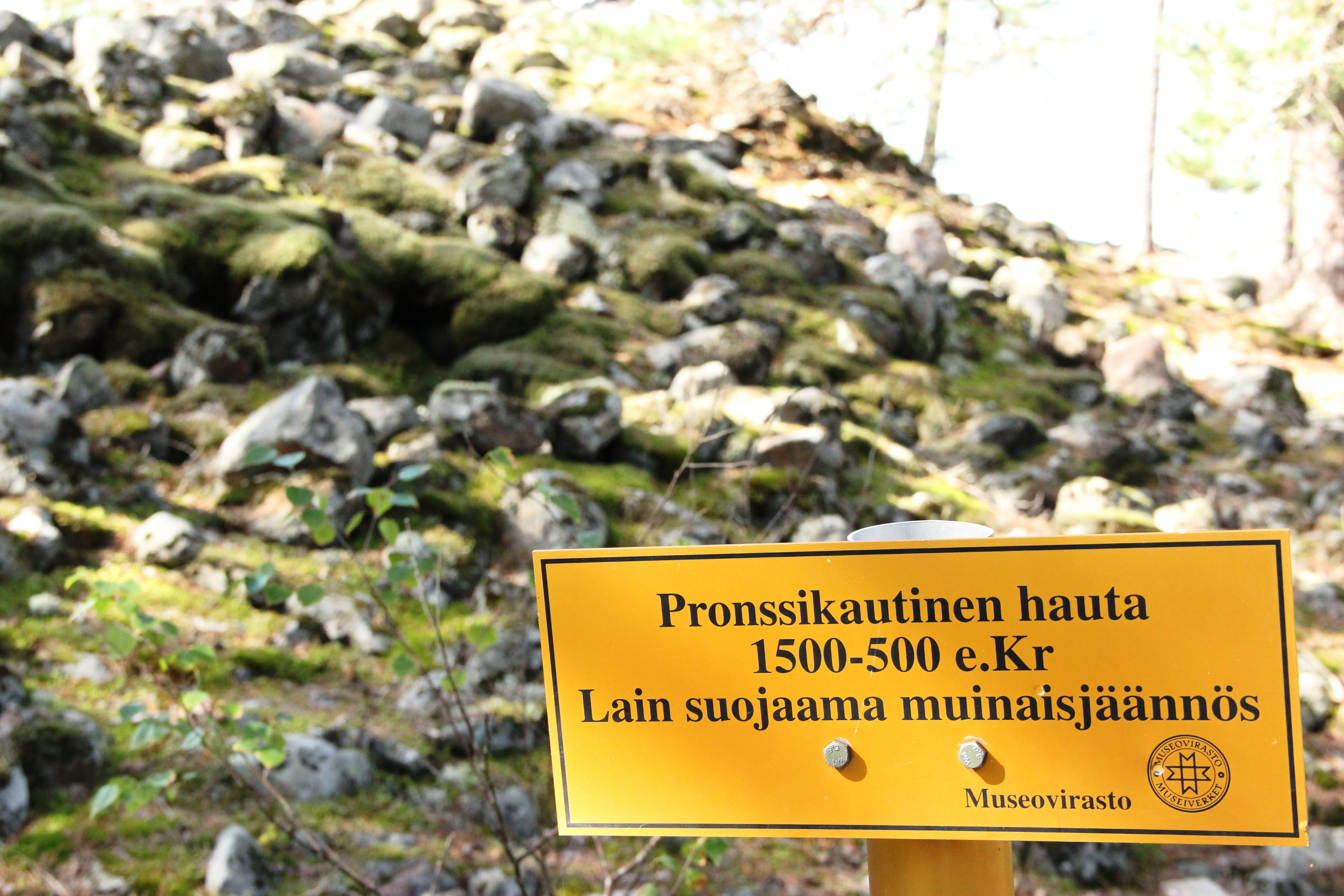
Burial mound and a sign informing that the site is protected by law

Krejansberget is a cliff in Siuntio, Finland, that rises 70 meters above the sea level. The hill is the highest point of Siuntio Church Village. Krejansberget is known for a large Bronze Age burial site that lies on top of it. The burial mounds on top of the hill are protected by law and the protection of the area is monitored by the Finnish Heritage Agency.

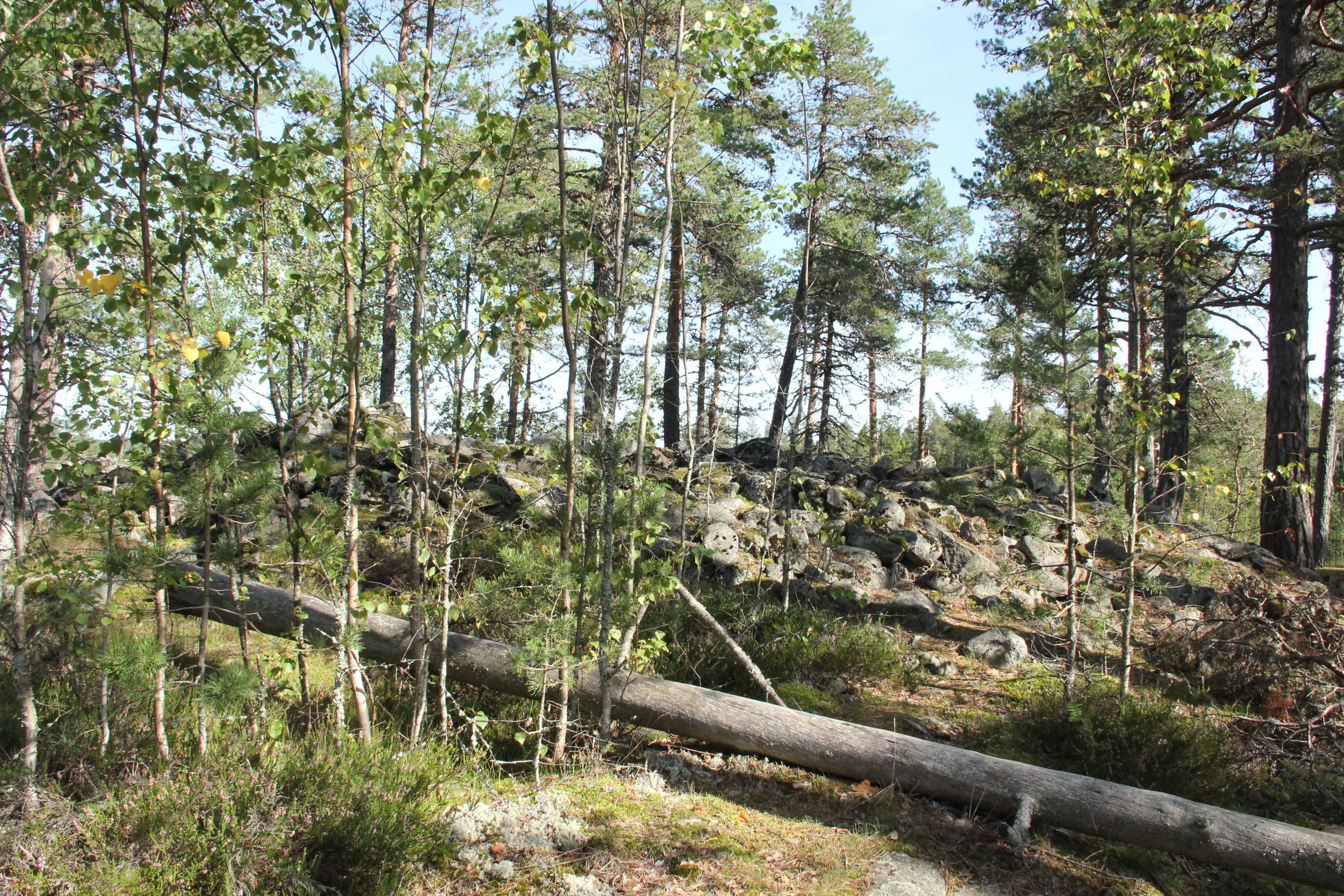
Bronze Age burial mound on Krejansberget

During the Bronze Age the sea level used to be much higher so that only the highest peaks of hills and cliffs were visible. As these were the only visible land areas, they were chosen for burial purposes.

A nature trails that starts from Siuntio Local History Museum leads on top of Krejansberget. Krejansberget is also one of 14 valuable hill and cliff areas of state interest in Siuntio.

== See also ==
- Luntoberget
- Skällberget Hill Fort
- Ekeberga Burial Site
