= Siuntio Museum =

Museum in Siuntio, Finland

Coordinates: 60°10′42″N 24°12′31″E

- Sjundeå museum
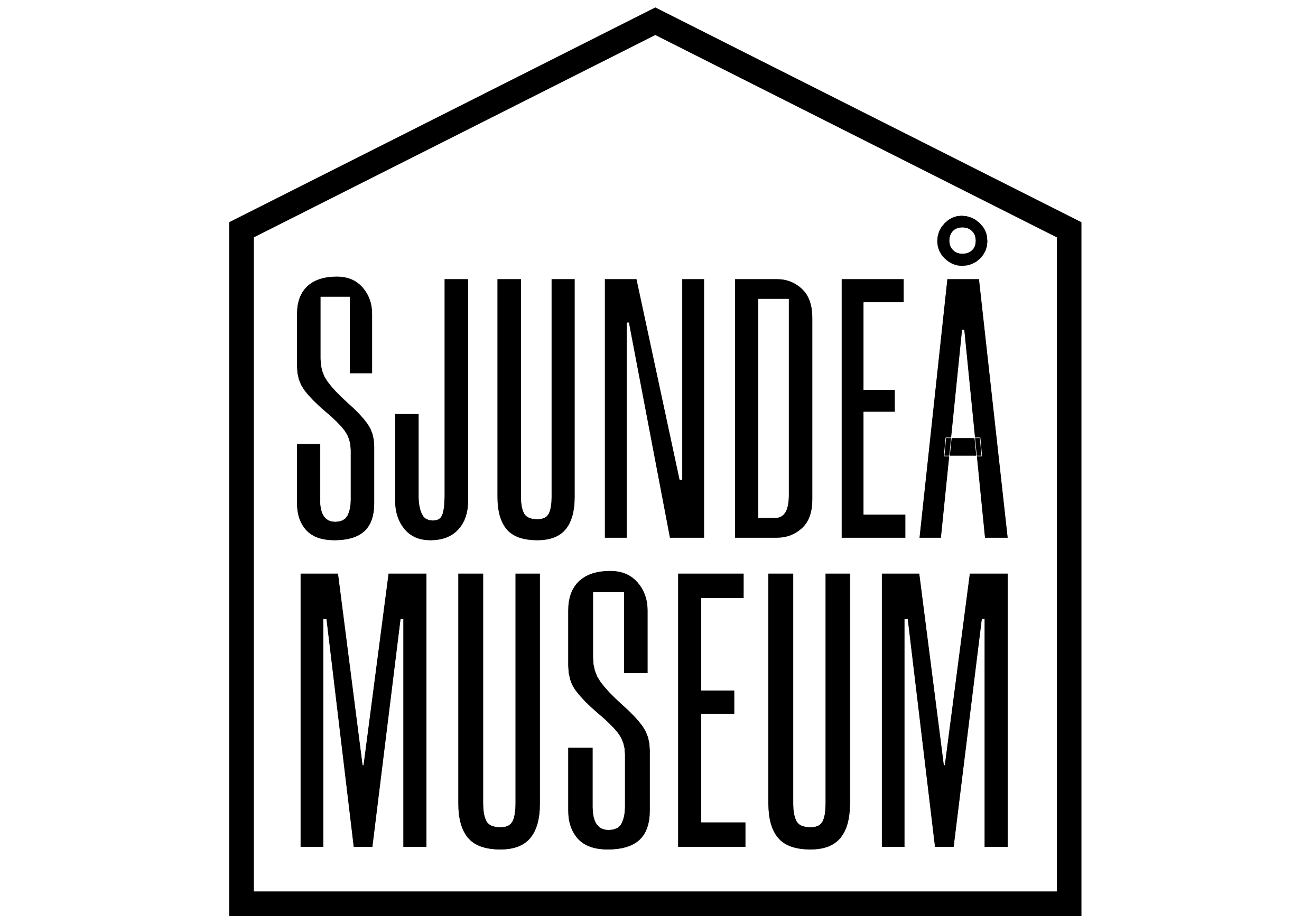

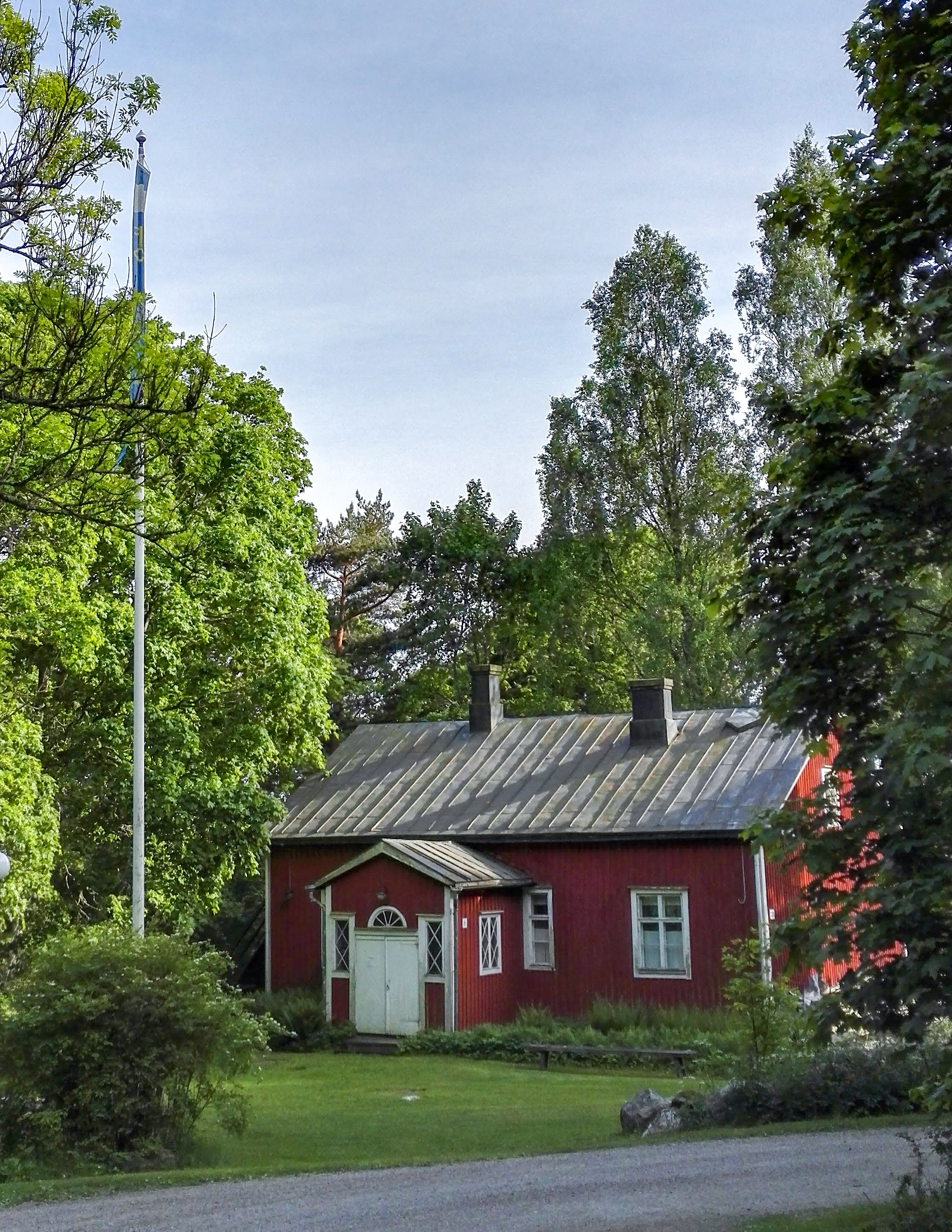
- Siuntio Local History Museum main building, the former Fredriksberg school
- Former name: Siuntio Local History Museum
- Established: 1934
- Location: Siuntio, Uusimaa region, Finland
- Type: Local History Museum
- Collection size: 4,000
- Owner: Hembygdens Vänner i Sjundeå r.f.
- Website: https://www.sjundeamuseum.fi/

Siuntio Museum (Finnish: Siuntion museo, Swedish: Sjundeå museum) is a museum that exhibits the local history and culture of Siuntio in Finland. The museum has been run by a local Swedish-speaking organisation called Hembygdens Vänner I Sjundeå (translates to The Friends of Homeland in Siuntio) in its current location since 1965. Siuntio Museum is usually open during summer and during other times by request.

== Buildings ==
Siuntio Museum is located in Siuntio Church Village. The main exhibition is inside an old school building, Fredriksberg school. Apart from the school building, there are also several other old buildings in the museum area, such as two granaries, a shed, a smaller cottage, and a caretaker's residence.

== Exhibitions and collections ==
The museum has around 3000 to 4000 items in its collections. Most of these items have been received as donations. In 2025 the local heritage organisation started to digitalise its collections catalogue.

The main exhibitions in the Fredriksberg school building showcase items to visitors, ranging from prehistory to modern times in independent Finland. Points of interest include items from the Soviet rental era of Porkkala Naval Base, parts of an 18th-century organ from St. Peter's Church in Siuntio, and dolls from Mona Leo's puppetry.

== History ==
The museum was founded in 1934. Originally it was located in Fanjunkars croft, which was destroyed after the Second World War during the Soviet rental era of Porkkala Naval Base. Due to the rental period the museum was evacuated and relocated to its current location in Siuntio Church Village.

In May 2026, the association Hembygdens vänner i Sjundeå announced that they have launched the museum's new visual identity and website. In connection with the rebranding, the museum's name was changed to Siuntio Museum. Previously the museum was called Siuntio Local History Museum.

== Cultural Landscape ==
The hill of Krejansberget is situated adjacent to Siuntio Museum, known for Bronze Age burial mounds on top of it. A nature trail leads from the museum area to the top of Krejansberget, offering a panoramic view of the river valley of Siuntio Church Village, Siuntio Church, and Suitia Manor.

== Images ==
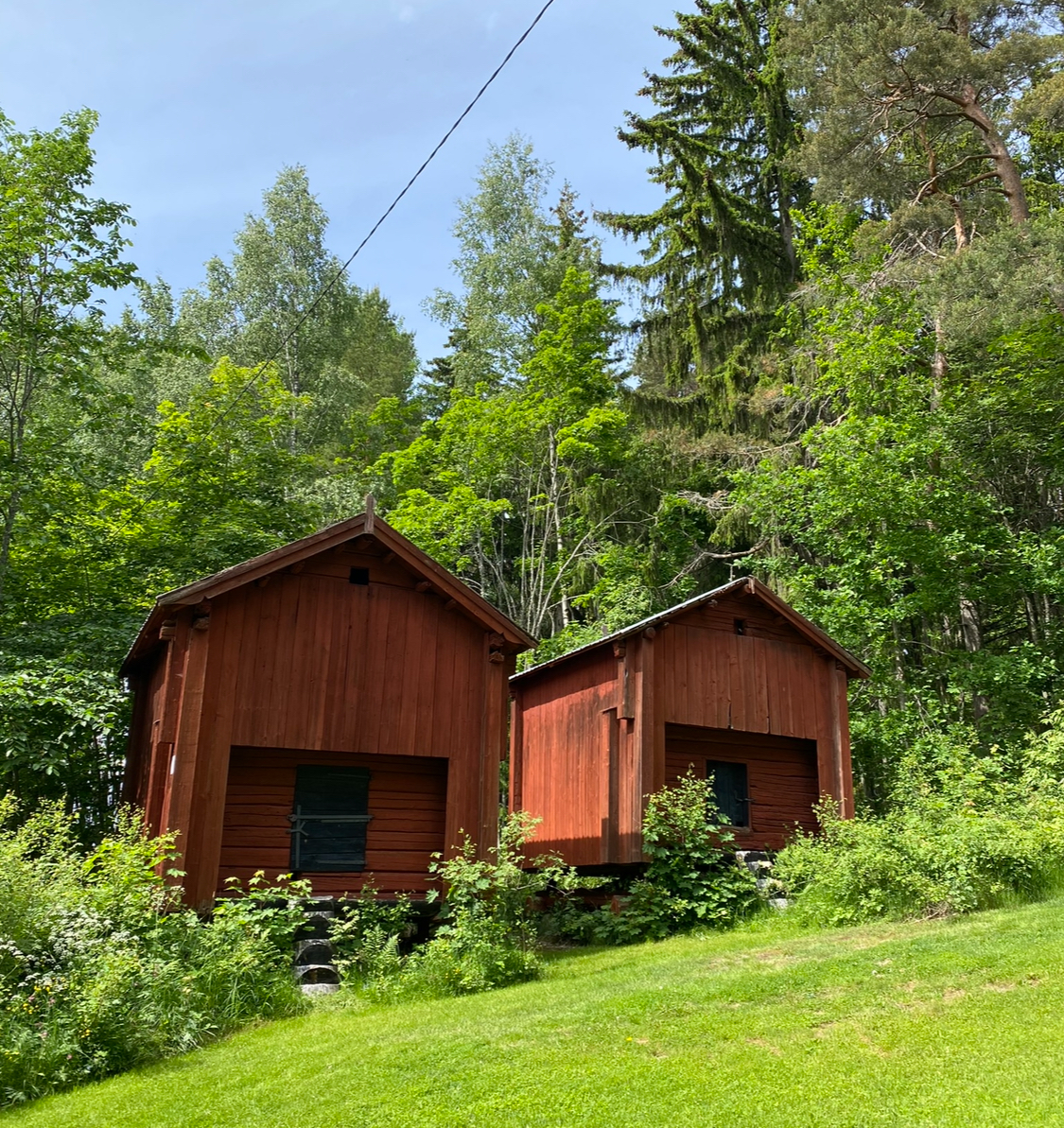
Two granaries in the museum area.

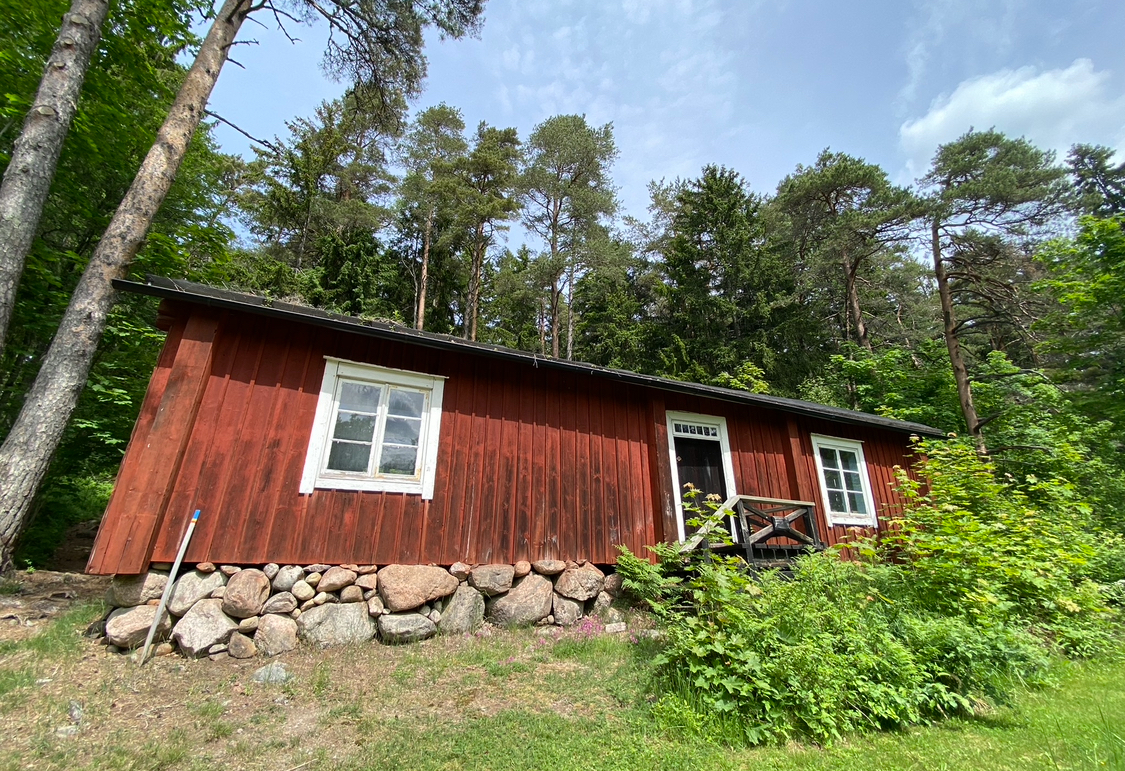
A cottage in the museum area.

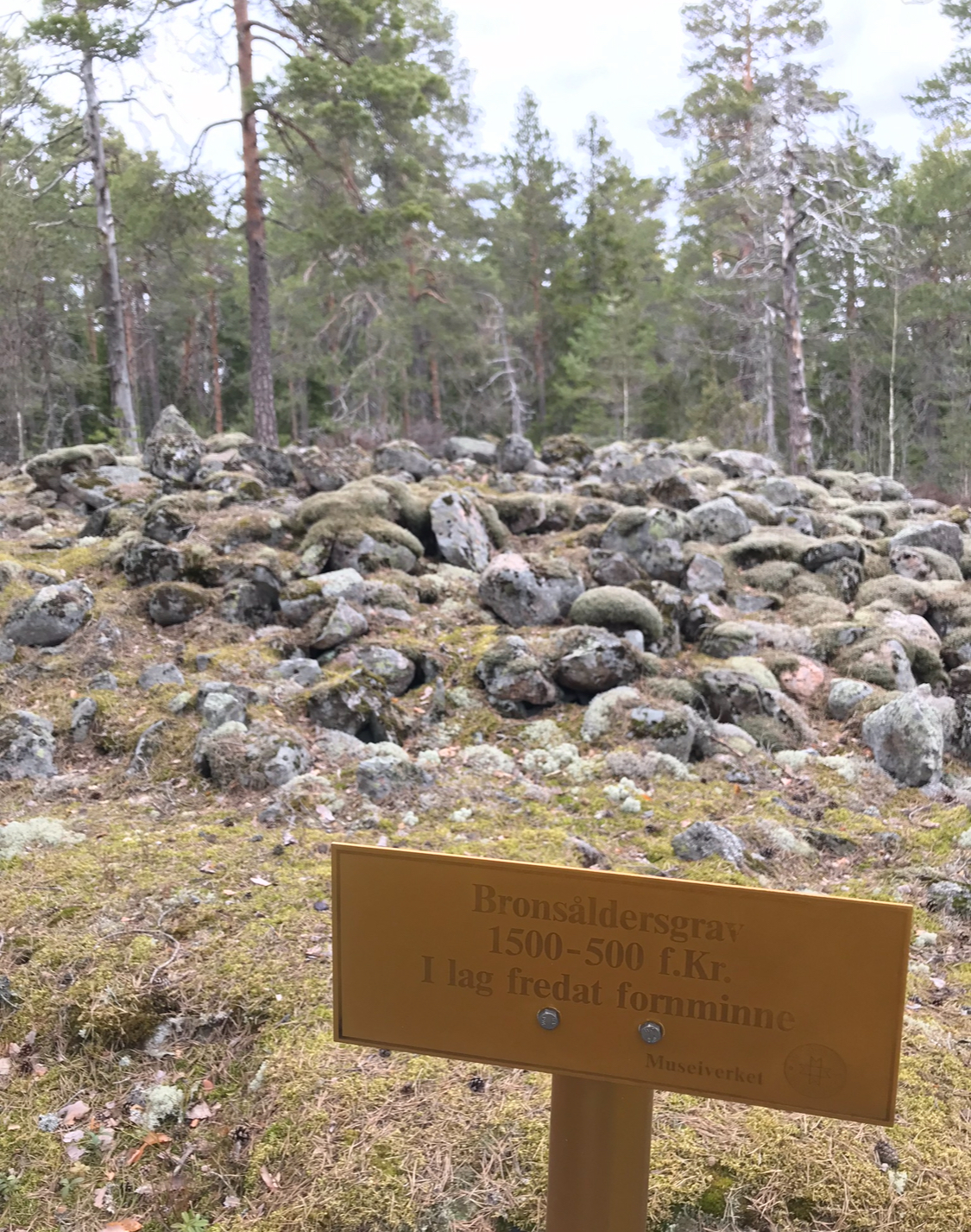
Bronze Age burial mount on Krejansberget hill.

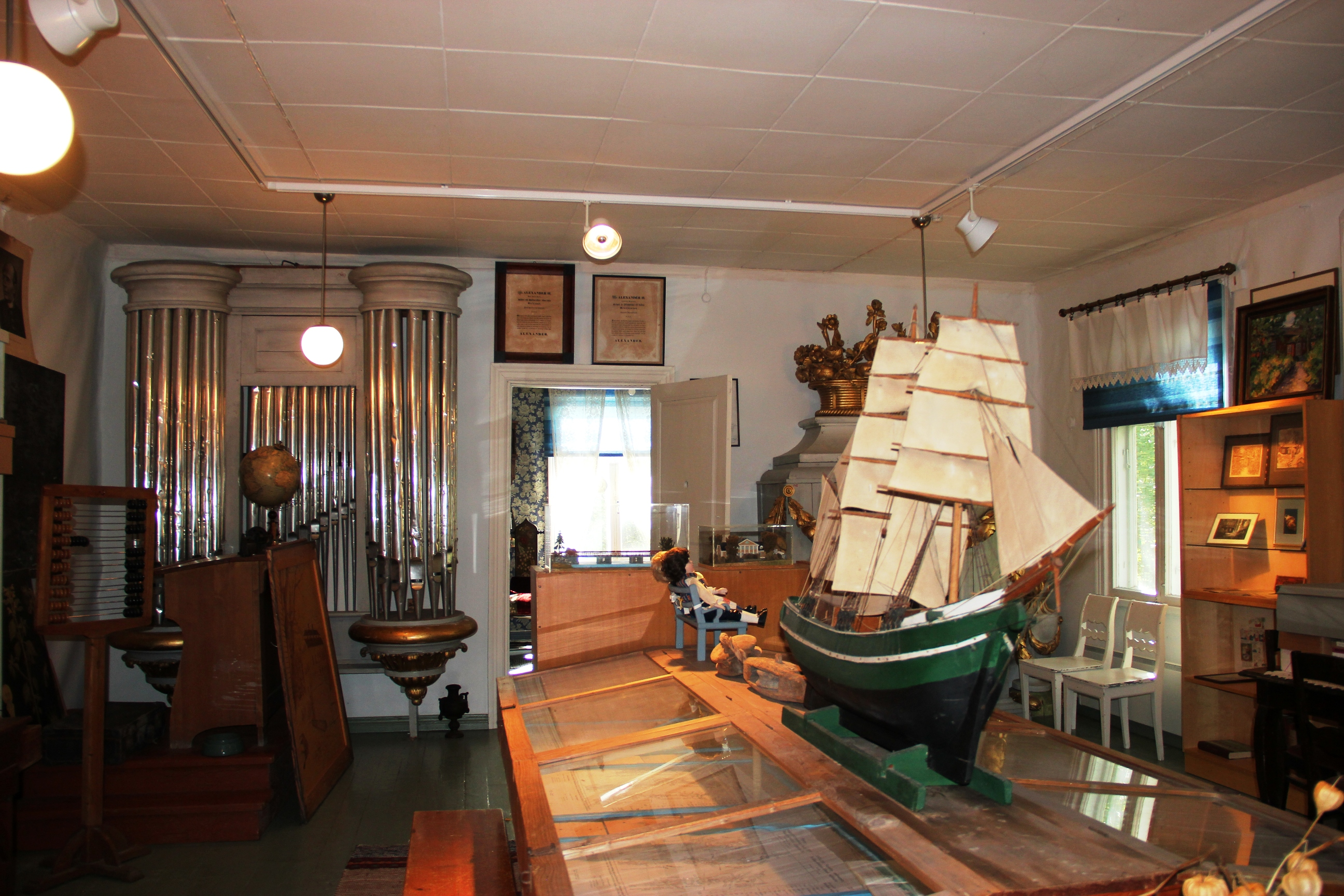
Main exhibition room in Siuntio Museum

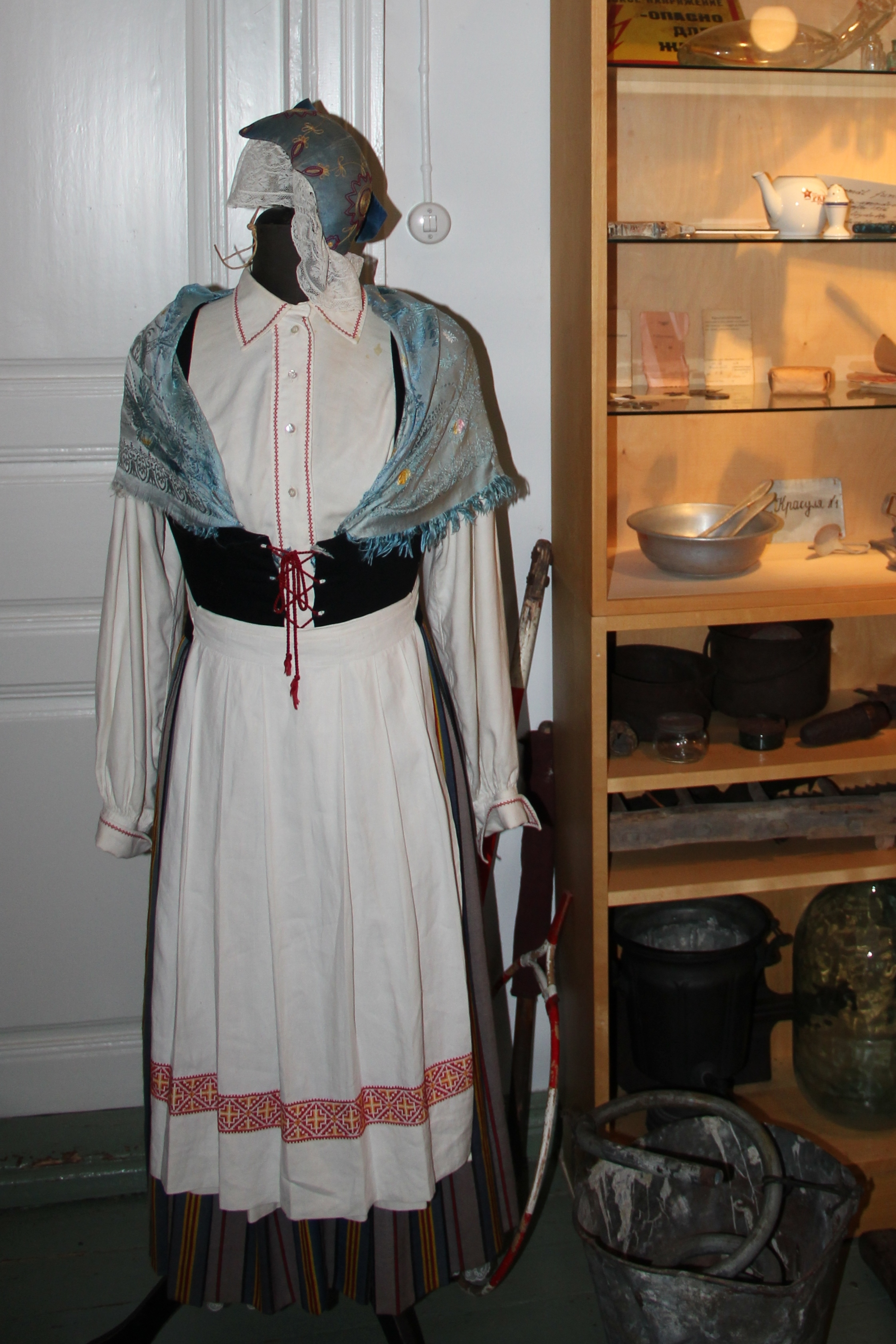
National dress of Siuntio exhibited in the museum.

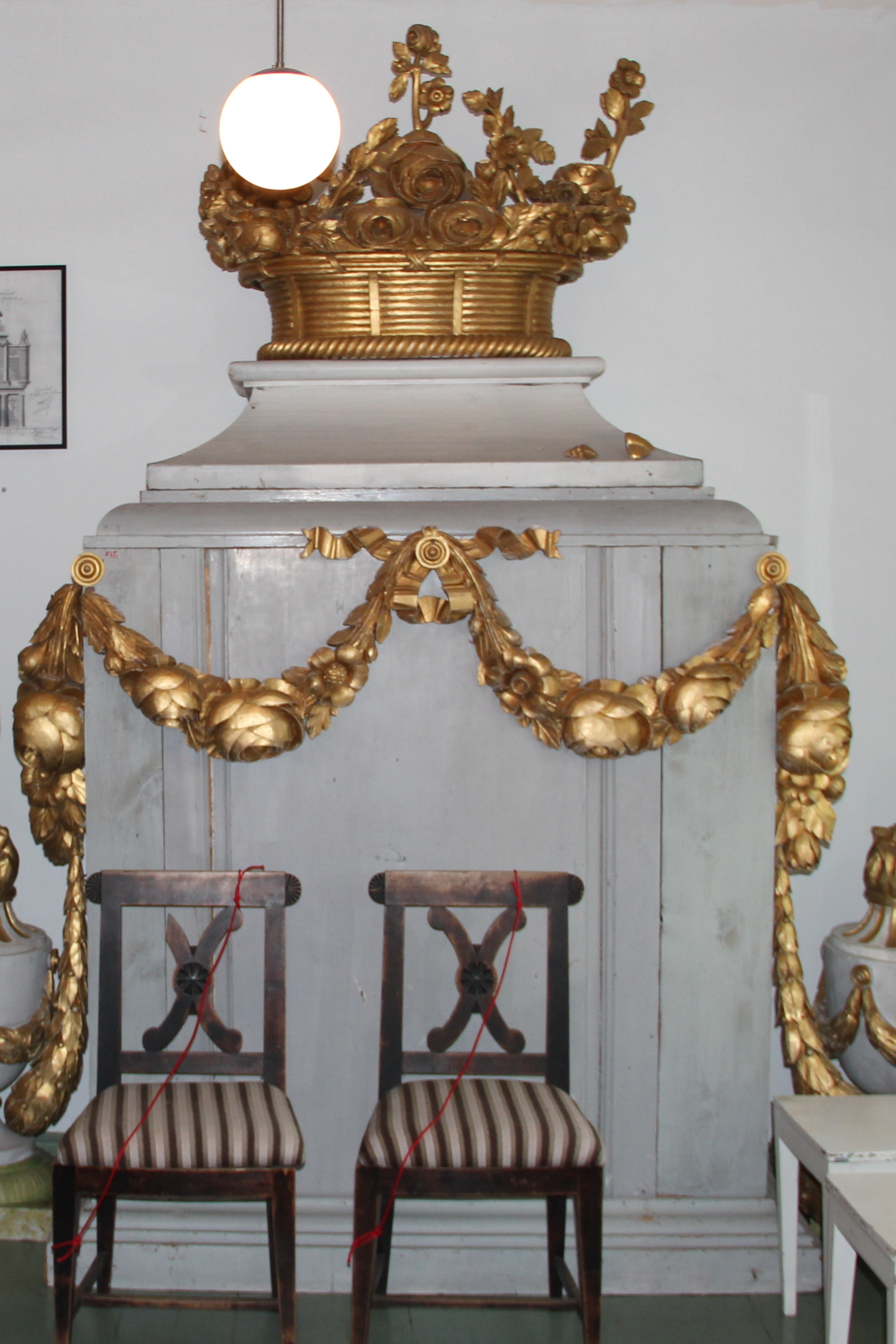
Part of the 18th century organ in the museum.
