= Luntoberget =

Historic hill in Siuntio, Finland

Coordinates: 60°11′36″N 24°14′24″E

Luntoberget is a hill in Siuntio in Finland which rises 92 meters above sea level. The hill is known for a Bronze Age burial site that is located on top of it. Luntoberget, together with its burial mounds, is considered a pre-historic site protected by law.

The hill landscape of Luntoberget forms one of together 14 nationally significant landscapes found from Siuntio. The owner of the hill, Siuntio Parish Union, established a nature reserve to Luntoberget in 2022.

== See also ==
- Krejansberget
