= Siuntio Church Village =

Siuntio Church Village Finnish: Siuntion kirkonkylä Swedish: Sjundeå kyrkoby
- Village
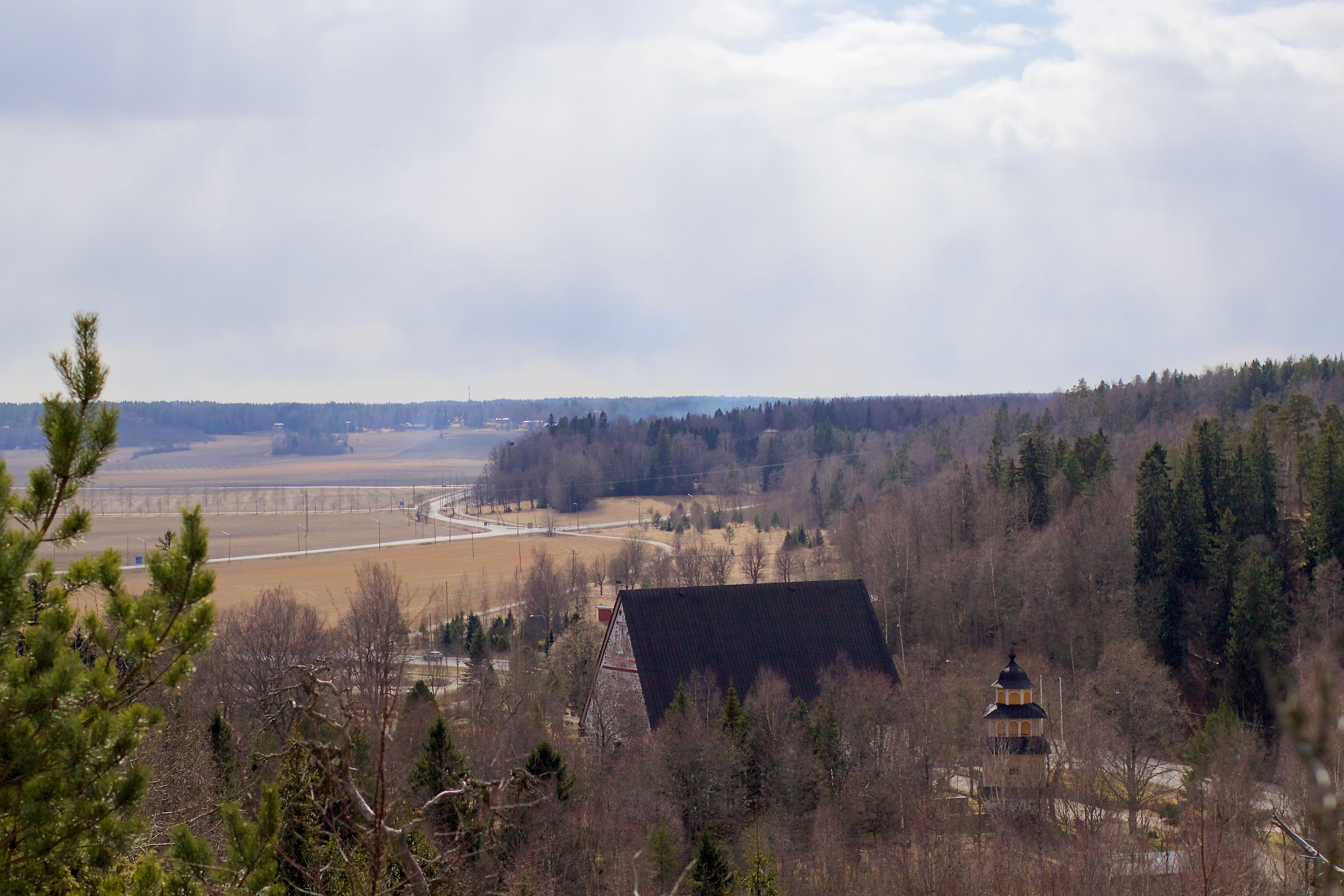
- Aerial view of the village and church

- Location in Finland
- Coordinates: 60°10′43″N 24°12′03″E
- Country: Finland
- Region: Uusimaa
- Municipality: Siuntio

Area
  - Total: 1.87 km^{2} (0.72 sq mi)

Population (31 December 2020)
  - Total: 353
  - Density: 1,888/km^{2} (4,890/sq mi)
- Time zone: UTC+2 (EET)
  - Summer (DST): UTC+3 (EEST)
- Postal code: 02570

The Siuntio Church Village (Finnish: Siuntion kirkonkylä, Swedish: Sjundeå kyrkoby) is a rural village of the Siuntio municipality in Uusimaa, Finland. At the end of 2020, the village had 353 inhabitants. The village was the former administrative center of the municipality before it was moved in the 1950s into the Siuntio Station Area, which grew larger in terms of population due to the placement of Siuntio railway station.

== Services ==
The Church Village is, as its name suggests, known for its medieval stone church, St. Peter's Church. The village also houses the Siuntio Local History Museum, which tells about the local history of the area.

The village used to house even banks, different shops and the municipal administration office at Åvalla. All of the services are located nowadays around the railway station area. Only the parish office remains next to the church.

== Images ==
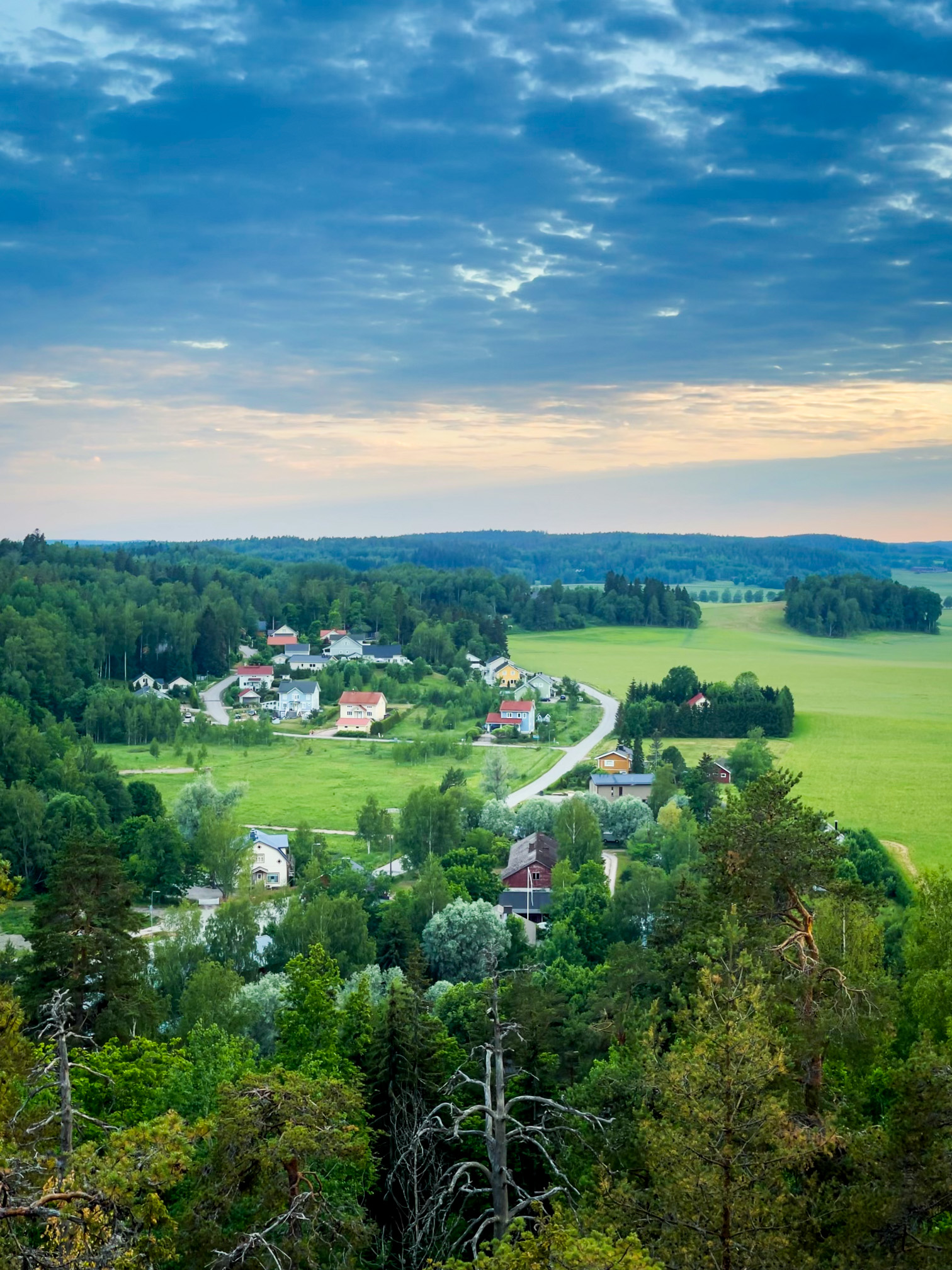
Siuntio Church Village seen from the top of Krejansberget.

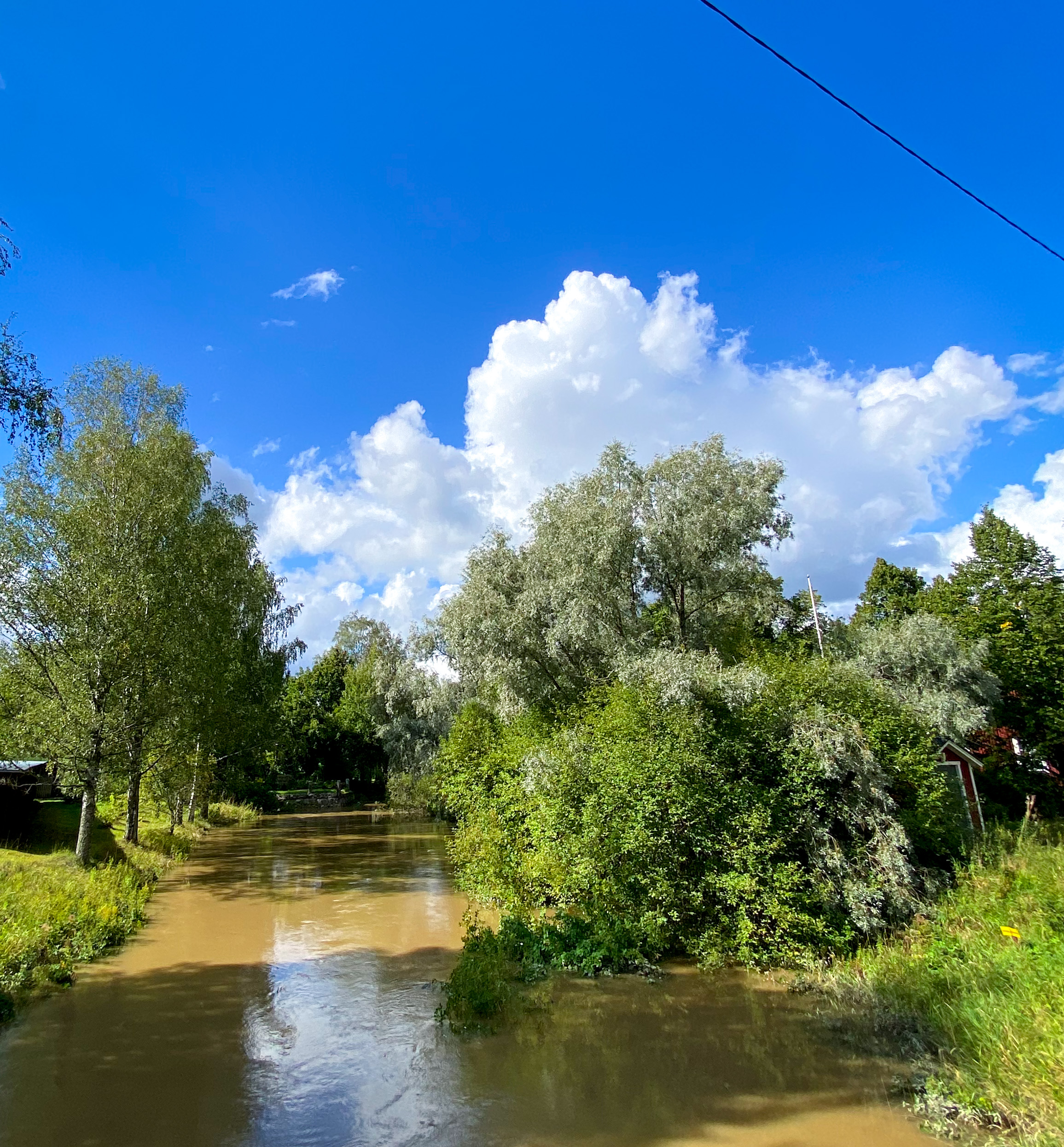
River Kirkkojoki in Siuntio Church Village.

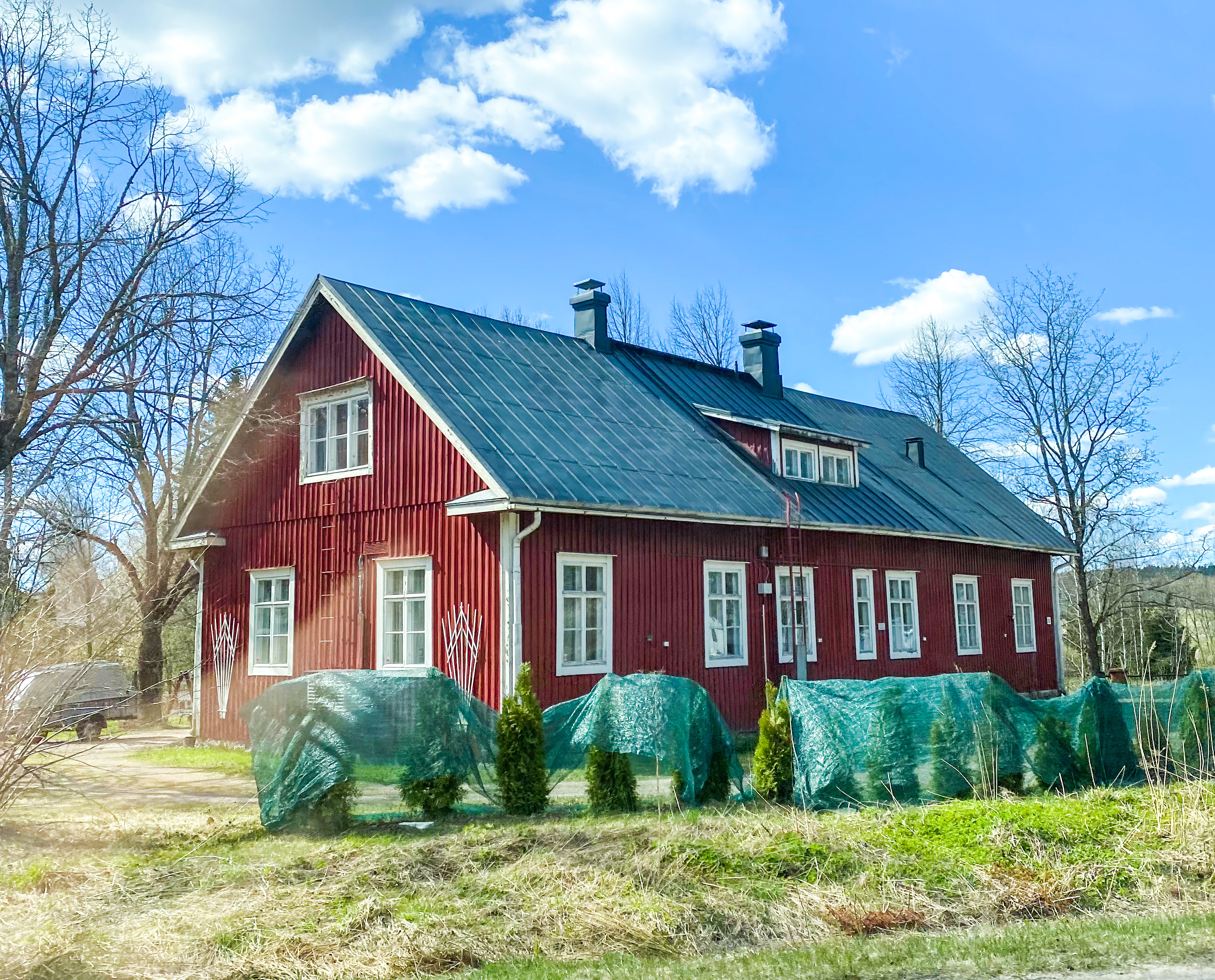
The former municipal hall, Åvalla.

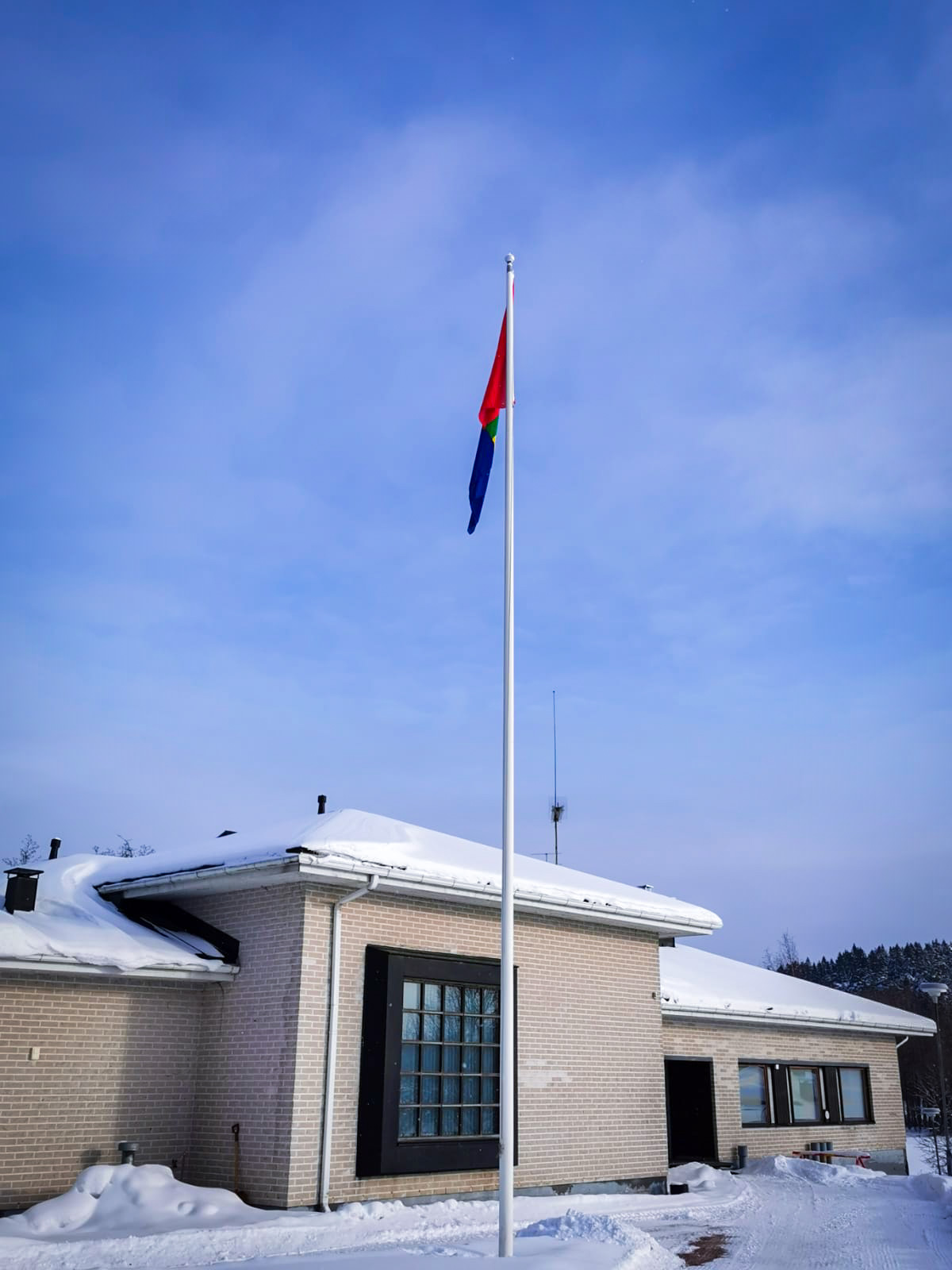
The parish hall that houses the parish office.

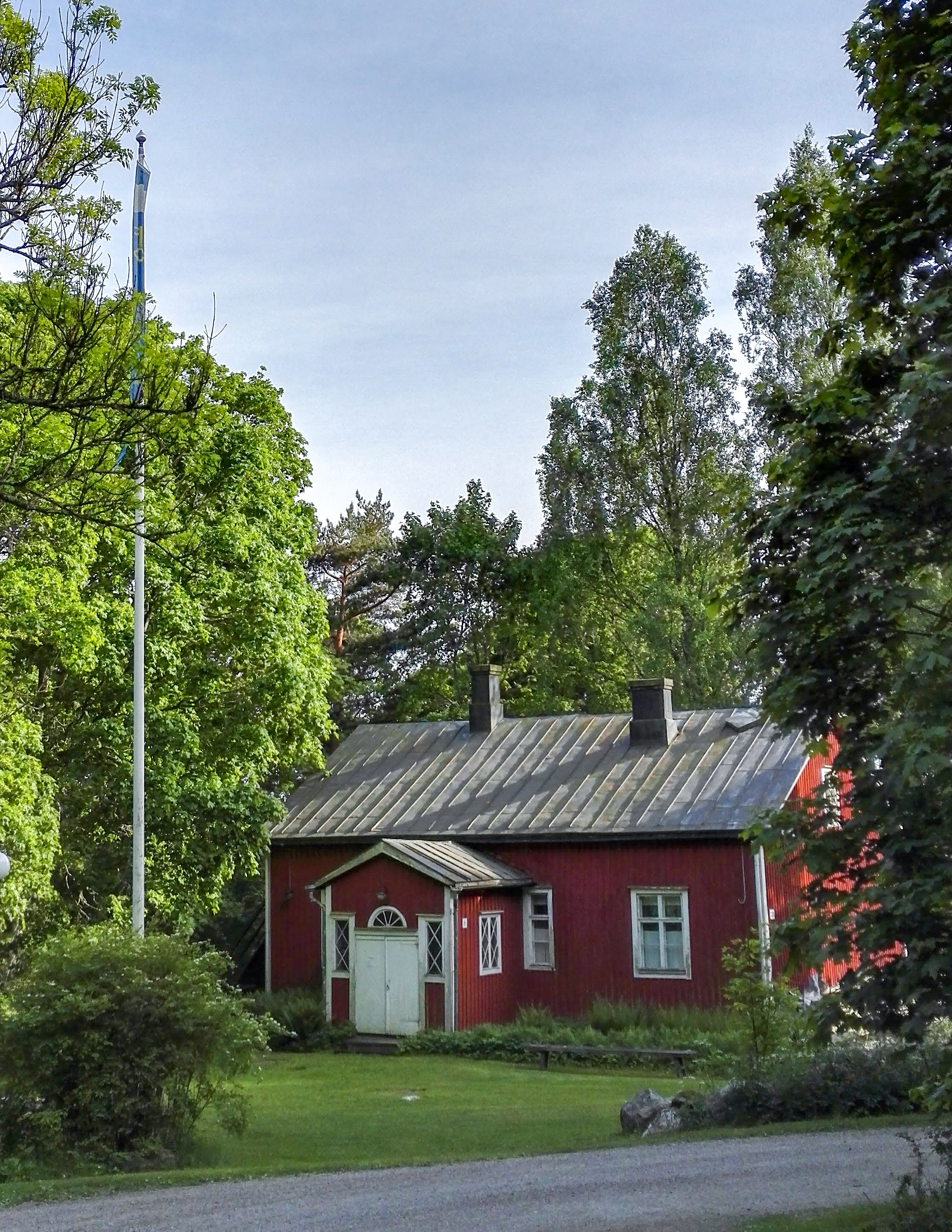
Siuntio Local History Museum.
