= Ekeberga Burial Site =

Iron Age burial site in Uusimaa, Finland

Coordinates: 60.1890°N 24.2025°E

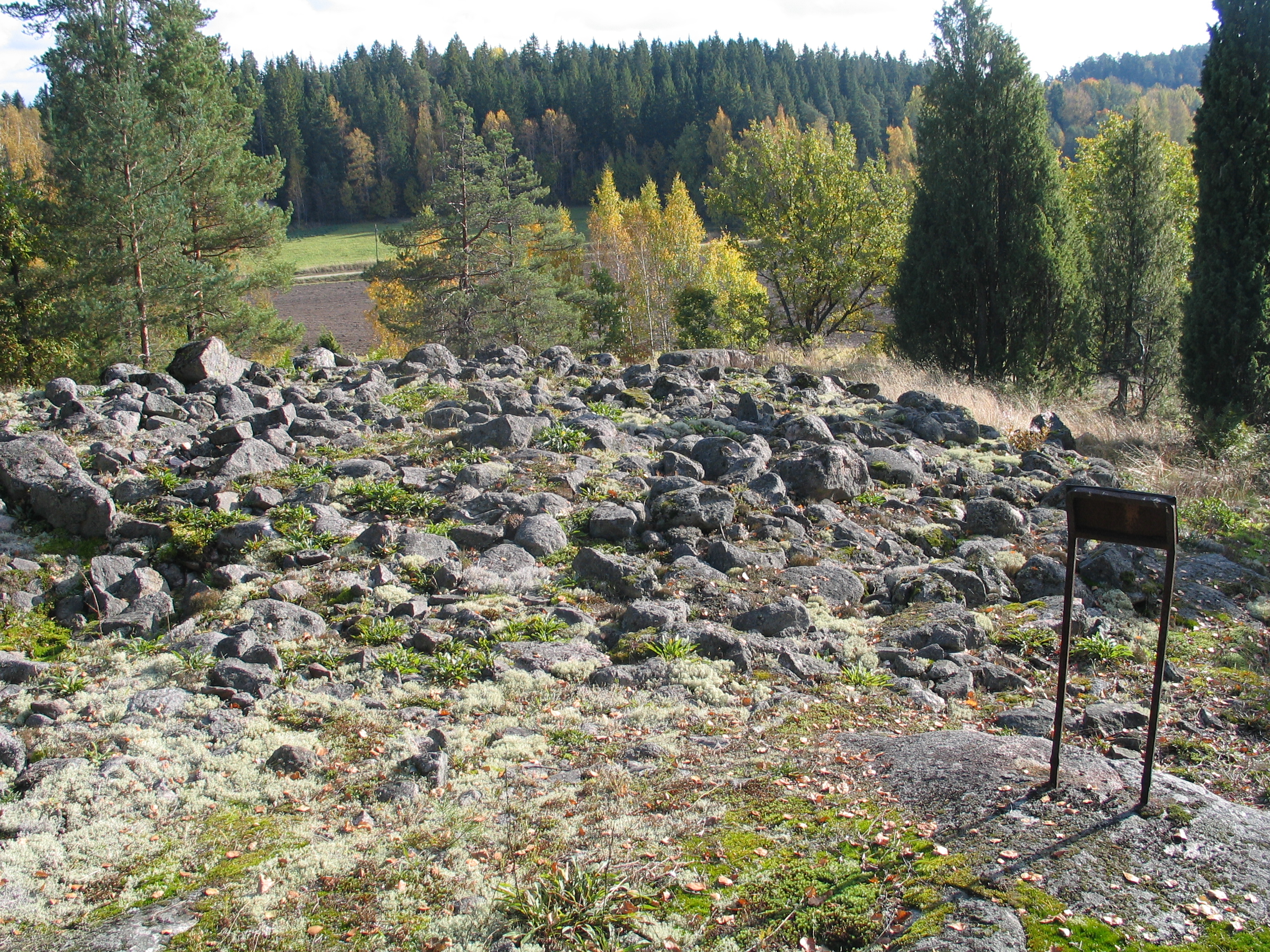
Burial Mound at Ekeberga Burial Site in Siuntio.

Ekeberga Burial Site (Swedish: Ekeberga gravplats, Finnish: Ekebergan kalmisto) is a prehistoric burial site in Siuntio in Finland. The burial site dates back to the Roman time and is located on a hill near Siuntio Church Village, approximately 370 meters northeast from Suitia Manor. The site is protected by law and forms a part of the Nationally significant archaeological sites in Finland.

Ekeberga Burial Site consists of a burial mound built of stone. The mound, 18 x 13 meters in size, is dated back to the younger Roman Iron Age. The burial mound itself has never been located by a former sea shore, and the landscape around it is very much the same as the landscape during the time when the mound was originally built. Due to post-glacial rebound coastal areas of Finland have slowly been rising out of the Baltic Sea causing the shoreline to move. Several items have been found from the site during archaeological excavations, such as burned bones, bronze and iron objects as well as glass pearls.
