= Ojamo Manor =

Coordinates: 60°14′10″N 24°01′22″E

- Ojamon kartano / Ojamo herrgård
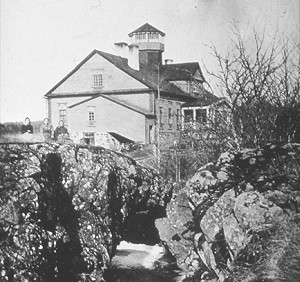
- Ojamo Manor and mine in 1870

General information
- Type: Manor House
- Architectural style: Empire style
- Town or city: Lohja
- Country: Finland
- Completed: 1850
- Owner: Town of Lohja

Technical details
- Floor count: 1

Ojamo Manor (Finnish: Ojamon kartano, Swedish: Ojamo herrgård) is a manor house in Lohja in Uusimaa, Finland. The site is known for housing the remains of the oldest iron mine in Finland. The manor house has since 2023 been owned by the Town of Lohja.

== History ==
Ojamo Manor is named in the written sources for the first time in 1384. The significance of the manor house grew during the 16th century when iron ore was found from its grounds. The first findings are dated between 1528 and 1540.

=== Iron mine ===
The King of Sweden, Gustav Vasa, gave Erik Fleming, the owner of Suitia Manor in Siuntio, a permission to mine iron ore from the grounds of Ojamo Manor in 1542. From Ojamo the iron was transported to Siuntio to be refined in Suitia Ironworks. The iron mine in Ojamo is the oldest known iron mine in Finland. Attempts to mine iron ore from the grounds of Ojamo were done even during the 19th century. However, the mining operations ceased for the last time in 1862.

=== Main building ===
The current main building of Ojamo Manor was built using timber in 1850 by lieutenant colonel Dimitri Swertschkoff. Ojamo Manor represents richly decorated Russian empire style. The building has one floor and a centrally positioned tower, which is a later addition. The decorations on the window frames resemble Karelian building style.

Ojamo Manor is surrounded by a park. The southern part of the park has a maple alleyway, which leads to the grave of lieutenant colonel Swertschkoff. Other points of interest in the park area include several large mine openings on the ground, some of which are filled with water.

== List of owners ==
A list of owners of Ojamo Manor from 1540 onwards:

- Johan Larsson 1540–1545
- Henrik Johansson 1546–1559
- Henrik Johansson's widow Anna 1560
- Hans Johansson 1561–1596
- Hans Johansson's widow Brita 1596–1603
- Tomas Larsson 1616–1619
- Siegfrid 1620
- Nils Siegfridsson 1621–1624
- Simon Landsberger 1624-1629 (renting from the Crown);
- abandoned 1630–1644
- Jakob Wolle 1645-1646 (renting from the Crown)
- Peter Thorwöste the older and the younger 1647–1682
- Gabriel Tammelinus, Vicar, 1683–1695
- Anna Eriksdotter 1695–1713
- Brita Tammelin 1724–1731
- Henrik Tammelin, Assessor, 1732–1753
- Kristina Tammelin 1754
- Johan Gabriel Kihl, Assessor, 1755–1760
- Johan Gabriel Kihl's family 1760–1762
- Jakob Johan Westberg, Supervisor, 176317–67
- Karl Segercrantz, Captain, 1768–1775
- Anna Stina Carlborg 1776–1782
- Adolf Magnus Rotkirch, Captain, 1783–1788
- Axel Maximilian Carpelan, Leutnant, 1789–1816
- Albertina Eleonora 1816–1836
- Albertina Eleonora's family 1836–1842;
- Karl von Schoultz, Lecturer, 1843–1846
- Dmitri Swertschkoff, Lieutenant Colonel, 1847–1863
- Augusta Karolina Swertschkoff 1863–1869
- Augusta Karolina Swertschkoff's family 1869–1878
- Fanny Swertschkoff 1878–1891
- Isidor Swertschkoff, governor, 1891–1902
- Gustav Henrik Karlsson 1902–1922
- Antti Savolainen 1922–1968
- Unto and Eero Savolainen 1969–1992
- Eero Savolainen 1993–1997
- Foundation "Vanha Lohja -säätiö" 1998–2023
- Town of Lohja 2023-
