= Suitia Ironworks =

16th-century ironworks in Finland

Suitia Ironworks (Finnish: Suitian ruukki, Swedish: Svidja bruk), established in the 16th century, was the first ironworks in current-day Finland. The remains of the ironworks were discovered in Siuntio during archaeological excavations in December 2007.

== History ==
Suitia Ironworks, also called Nyby Ironworks, was established by councillor Erik Fleming on the grounds of Suitia Manor around 1530. During that time, the area of present-day Finland was part of the Swedish kingdom. The ironworks consisted of various entities located in several hamlets, all within the grounds of Suitia Manor. Iron ore from the mines at Ojamo Manor in Lohja was refined at Suitia Ironworks. The ironworks operated from around 1530 until 1558.

It is believed that Suitia Ironworks had entities in the hamlets of Tupala, Kvarnby, as well as Tupala-Nyby. Archaeological excavations were carried out in Tupala in 2007, and remains of preindustrial ironworks were discovered in the Hyttiskogen forest by a small creek called Tupalabäcken. Hydropower from Tupalabäcken creek was likely used to power the ironworks. It is believed that refined iron was transported from Tupala to Kvarnby to be further worked on. Rapids at Kvarnbyforsen could also have catered to the need for hydropower.

In 2020, remains of a large mill and slag from metallurgical activity were discovered in Tupala-Nyby. This hamlet, also then part of Suitia Manor, is bisected by Kivikoskenpuro creek, which has rapids at Tupala-Nyby. Like Tupalabäcken, this creek and its rapids could have provided hydropower for the ironworks.

Both Tupalabäcken creek in Hyttiskogen forest, and Kivikoskenpuro creek in Tupala-Nyby are protected by the Finnish Heritage Agency.

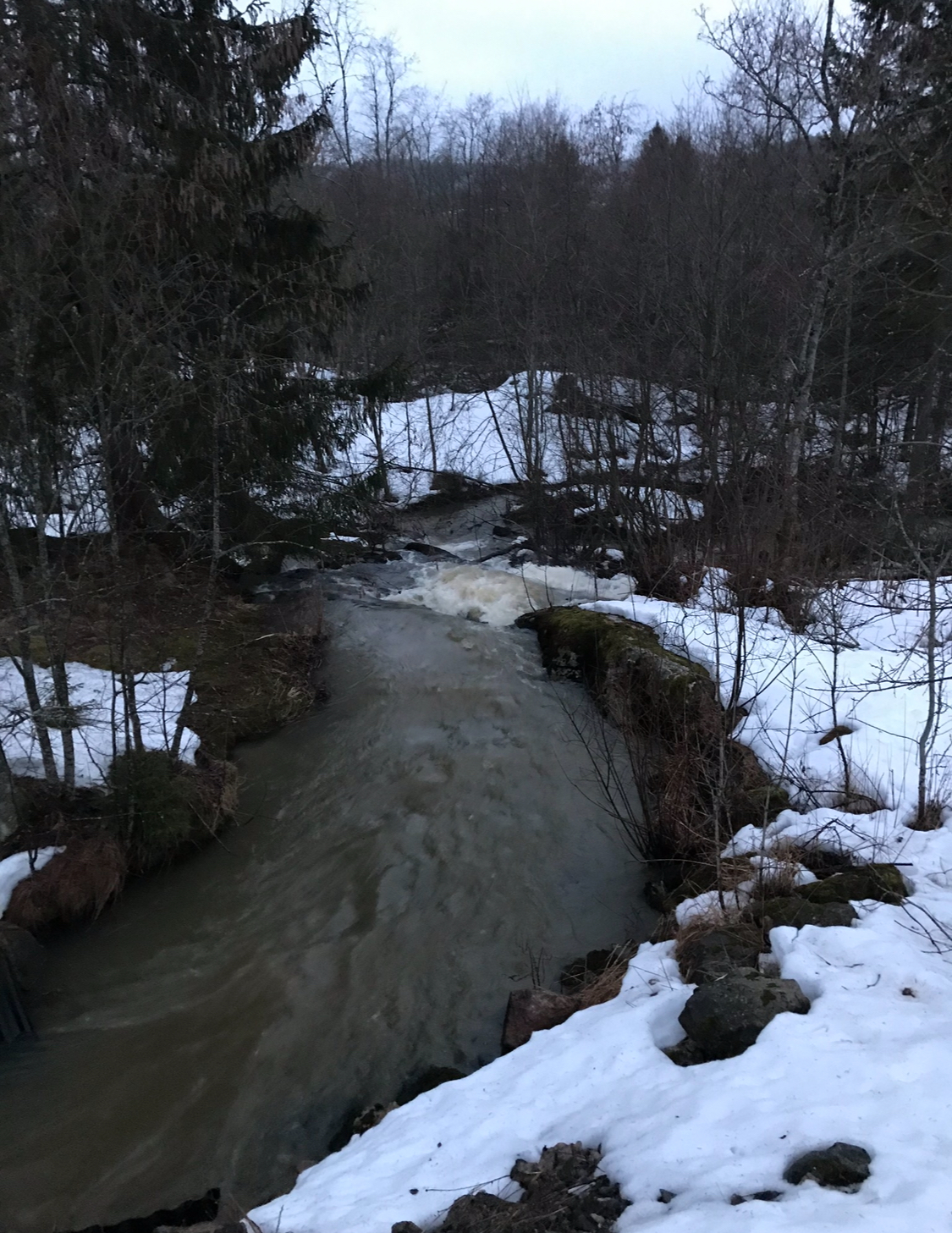
Kivikoskenpuro in Siuntio during winter

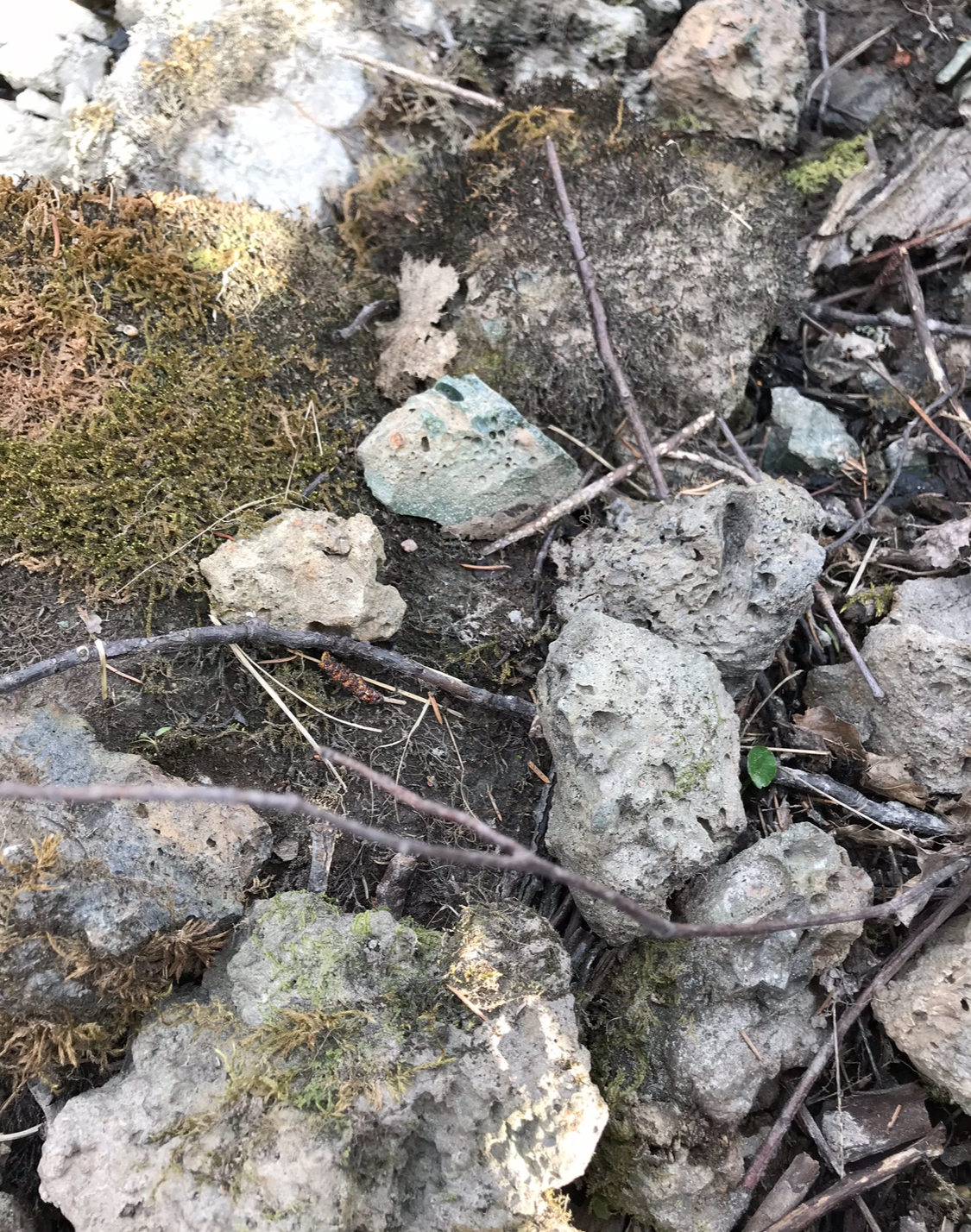
Slag by Kivikoskenpuro creek in Siuntio

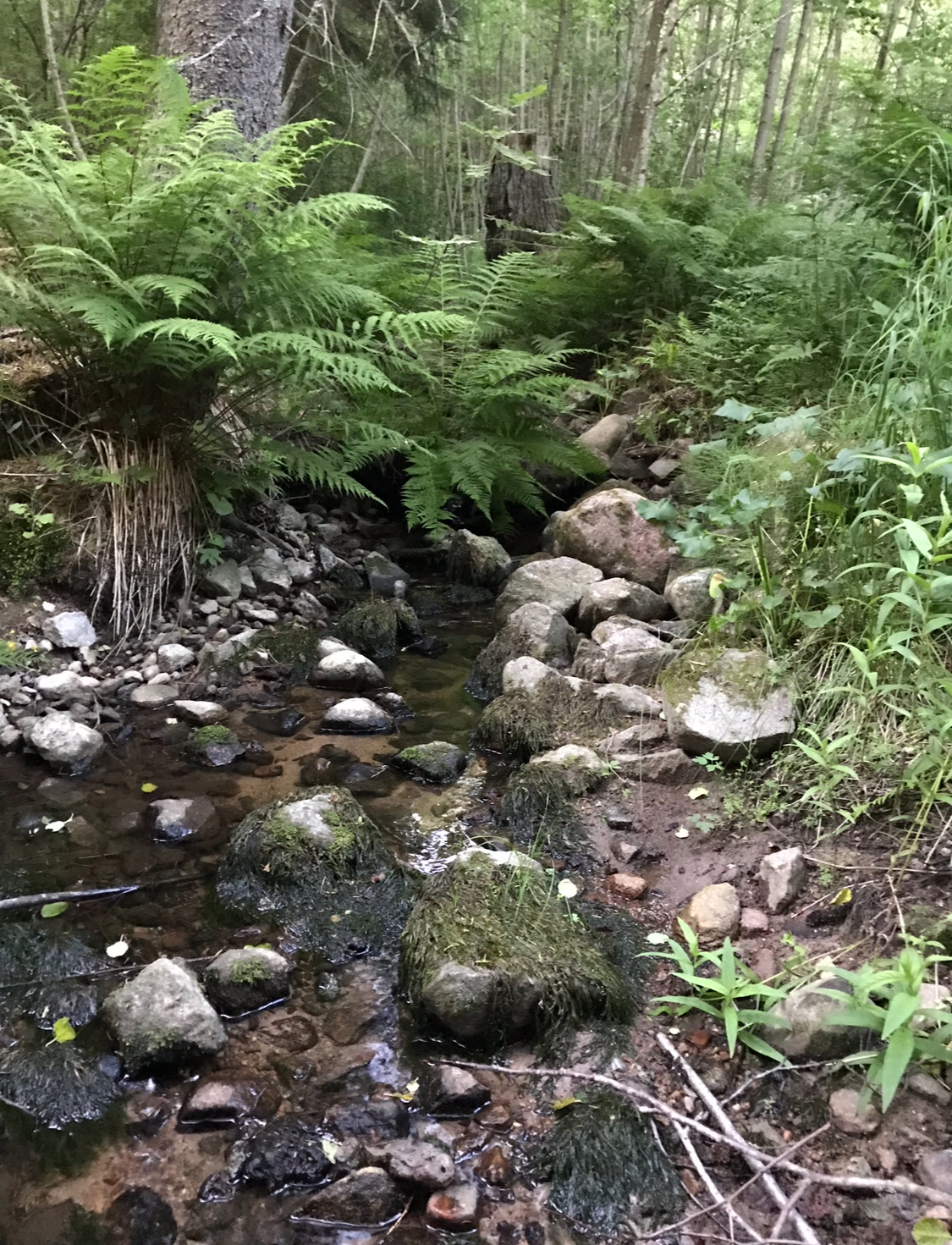
Tupalabäcken creek in Siuntio

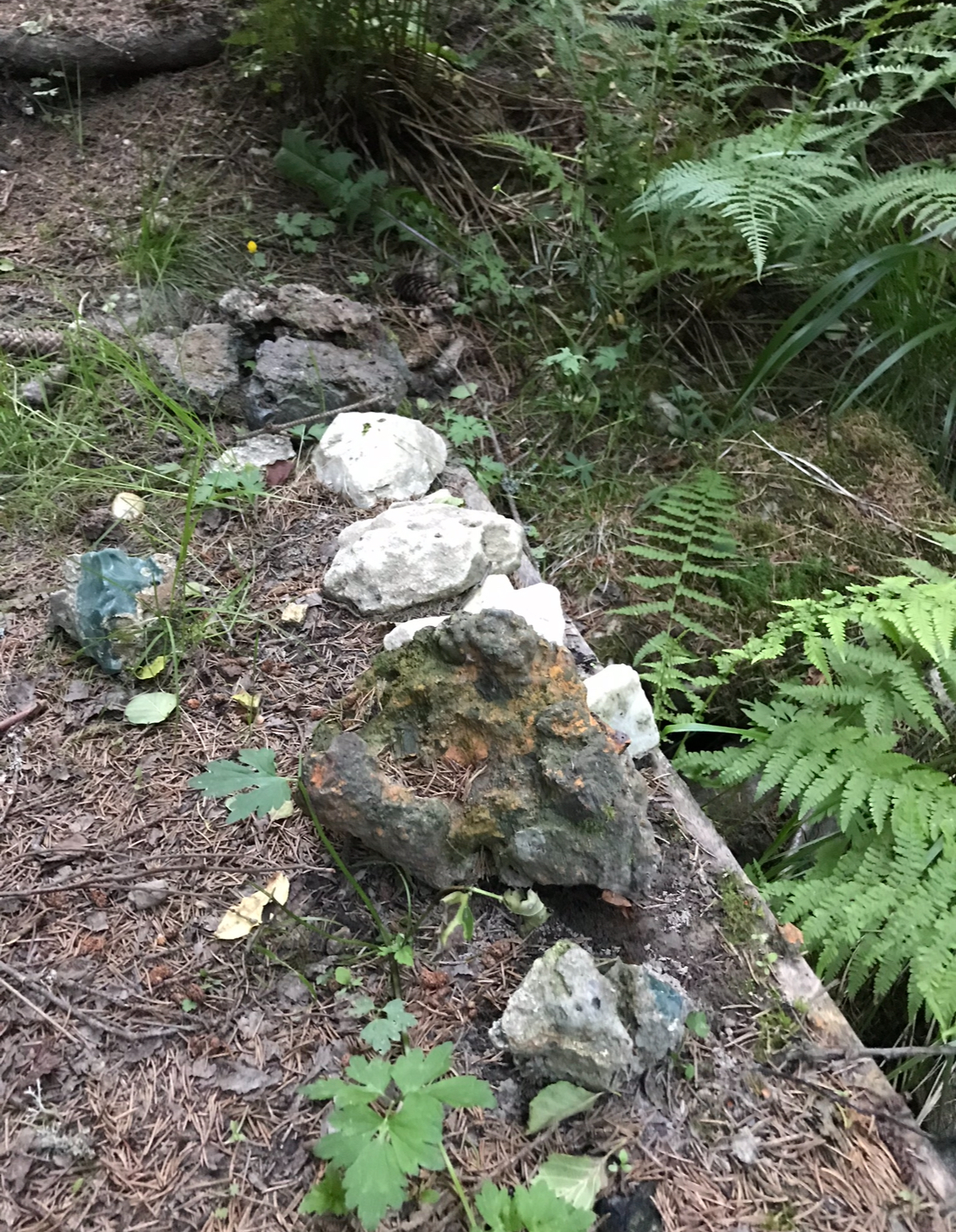
Slag by Tupalabäcken creek in Siuntio
