= Suitia Manor =

Historical manor house in Siuntio, Finland

Coordinates: 60°11′19″N 24°11′42″E

- Svidja Slott
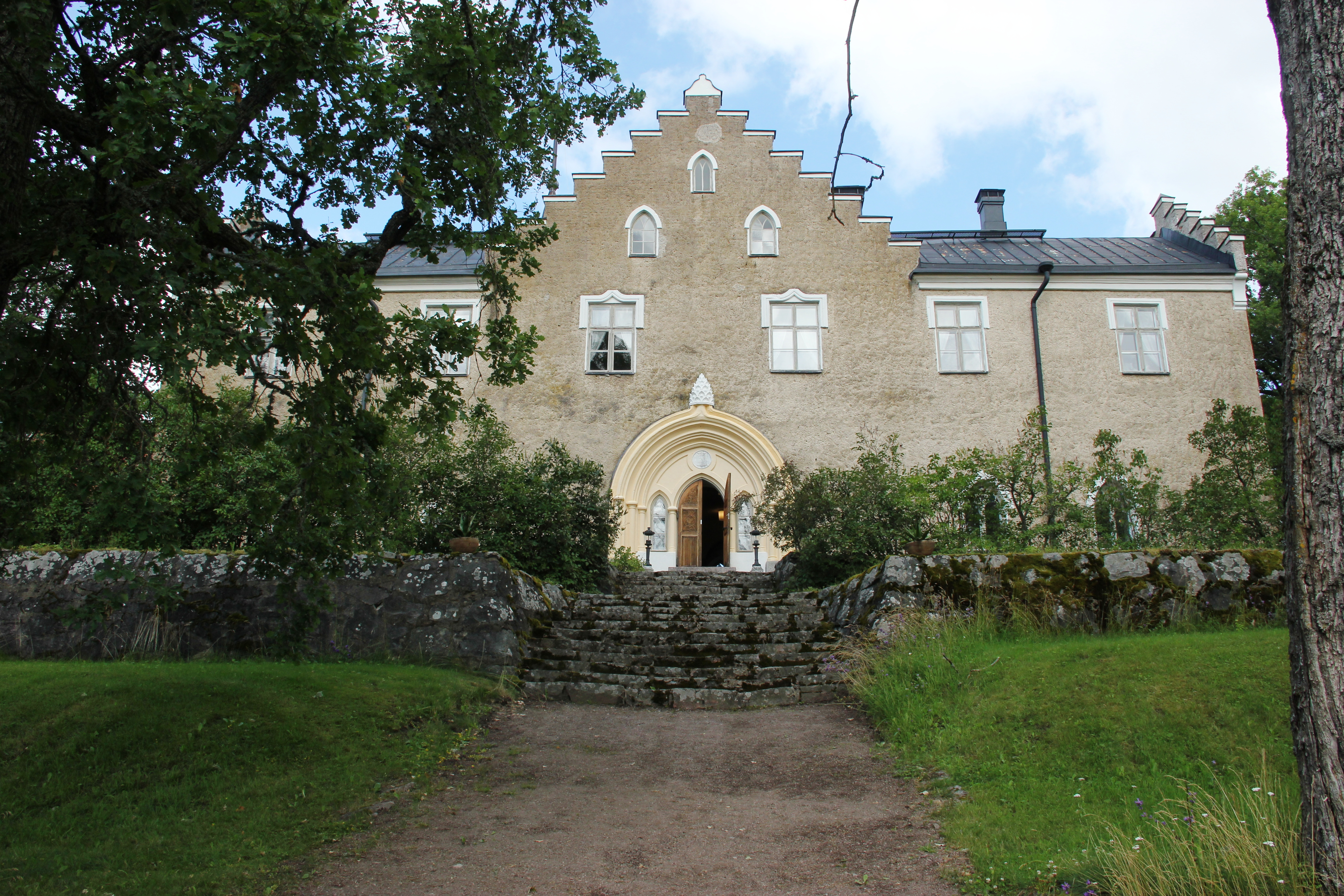
- Suitia Manor, facade seen from the garden.
- Interactive map of the Suitia Manor area

General information
- Type: Manor House
- Architectural style: Gothic Revival
- Location: Siuntio, Finland
- Construction started: 1400s
- Completed: 1540s, current facade in 1900
- Owner: Brothers Rehnberg

Technical details
- Material: Gray stone and brick
- Floor count: 2

Suitia Manor (Finnish: Suitian linna, Swedish: Svidja slott) is a historical manor house in Siuntio on the southern coast of Finland. The history of the manor dates back to the medieval era. The oldest parts of the current main building are from 1540s although the facade that we see today is from the early 1900s.

In the beginning of 2020 the estate consisted of 726 hectares of land with over 60 buildings. The main building of Suitia Manor is rather large with size of approximately 1 300 square meters.

Suitia Manor is located in north of Siuntio Church Village only about 1 kilometer from the medieval St. Peter's Church and river Kirkkojoki. Regional road 116 between Siuntio Church Village and neighbouring city of Lohja runs east of Suitia Manor.

Suitia Manor together with St. Peter's Church builds a Built cultural heritage site of national significance and therefore the area is protected by law. Protection of the area is monitored by the Finnish Heritage Agency.

Suitia Manor has also been a set for many Finnish movies.

== History ==
=== Early history ===
Suitia Manor is known from the 15th century. The manor house is mentioned for the first time in written document, regarding the borders of the lands of the Suitia Manor, in 1420. In this document Björn Ragvaldsson Stienkors, justice of Raseborg judicial district and overseer of Häme Castle, is named as the owner of Suitia. It is believed that Björn Ragvaldsson's father Ragvald Ragvaldsson created Suitia by joining a number of smaller estates together and then getting tax freedom for the newly created estate. Originally Suitia was most likely called Syrjä.

Björn Ragvaldsson's daughter Elin married riksråd Joakim Fleming in 1494 and therefore Suitia Manor was transferred to noble family of Fleming's ownership.

=== Era of Fleming family ===
Under the ownership of the Fleming family the manor was named Svidja which then turned into Suitia in the mouths of the Finnish-speaking people. Flemings owned another manor house in Pargas, Qvidja Manor, and it is believed that name Svidja is a reference to name Qvidja due to the similarity of the two names. The Flemings gained more land for Suitia Manor and eventually the manor house even had an own port by the Baltic Sea near the mouth of river Pikkalanjoki.

Riksråd Erik Fleming established ironworks in the lands of Suitia in 1530s. This establishment was the first preindustrial ironworks in Finland, which at the time was not an independent country but an eastern part of the Swedish kingdom. Suitia Ironworks, which is even called Nyby ironworks, had several different locations on the manor grounds in places that hydropower could have been used. These locations included for example Kvarnby rapids, Tupala Hyttiskogen and possibly also creek Kivikoskenpuro in Tupala Nyby. The ironworks didn't last long, though. Operations of the establishment ceased in 1550s.

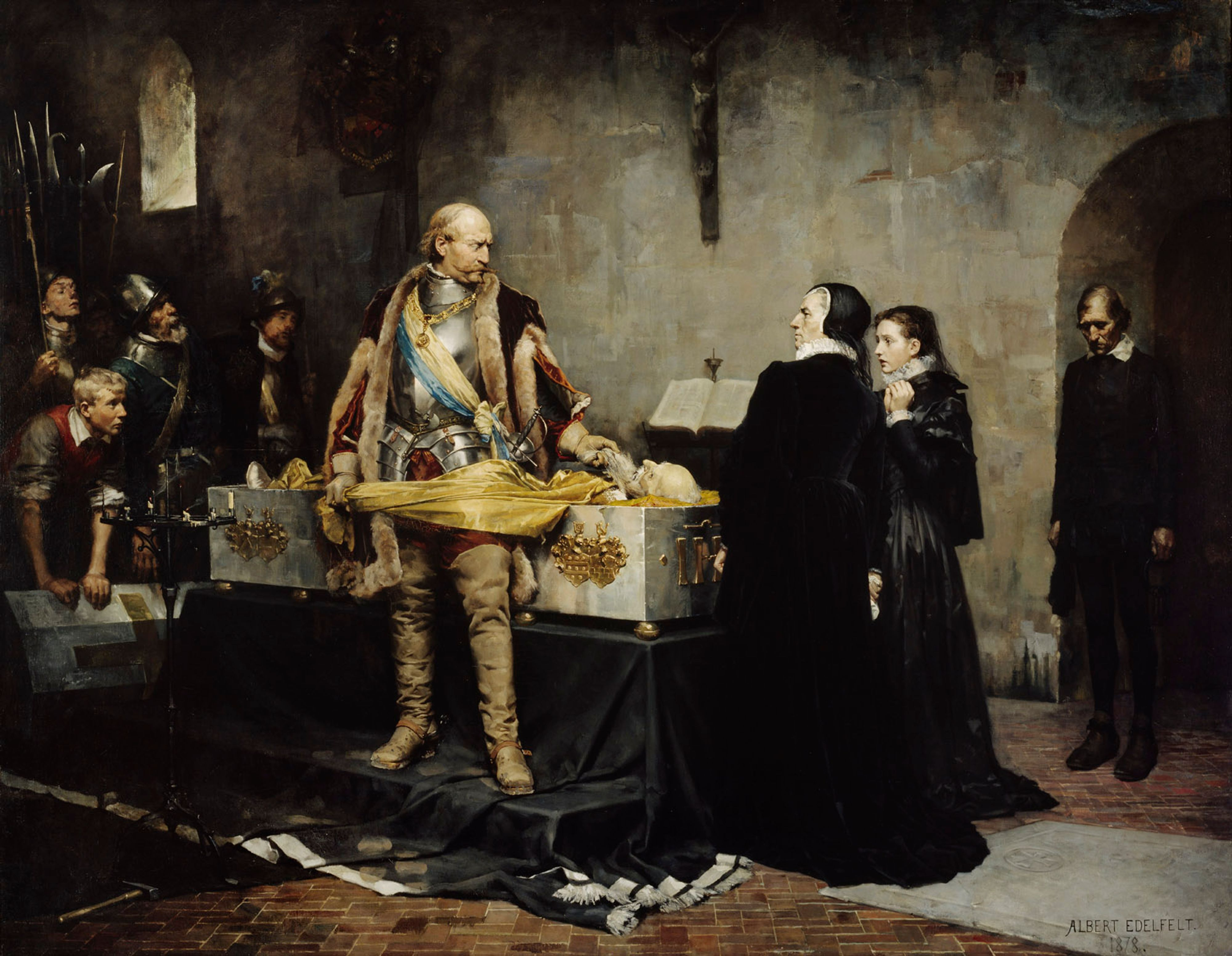
Duke Karl Insulting the Corpse of Klaus Fleming, Albert Edelfelt, 1878. Fleming's wife Ebba Stenbock on the right.

Baron Klaus Fleming, member of the privy council and a trustee of kings John III and Sigismund Vasa, lived almost his whole life at Suitia. The Flemings owned the manor house from 1494 to 1599 and again between 1661 and 1679. The female line of the family continued as the ladies of the estate all the way to the year 1730 when Suitia was sold to marshal Carl Henrik Wrangel.

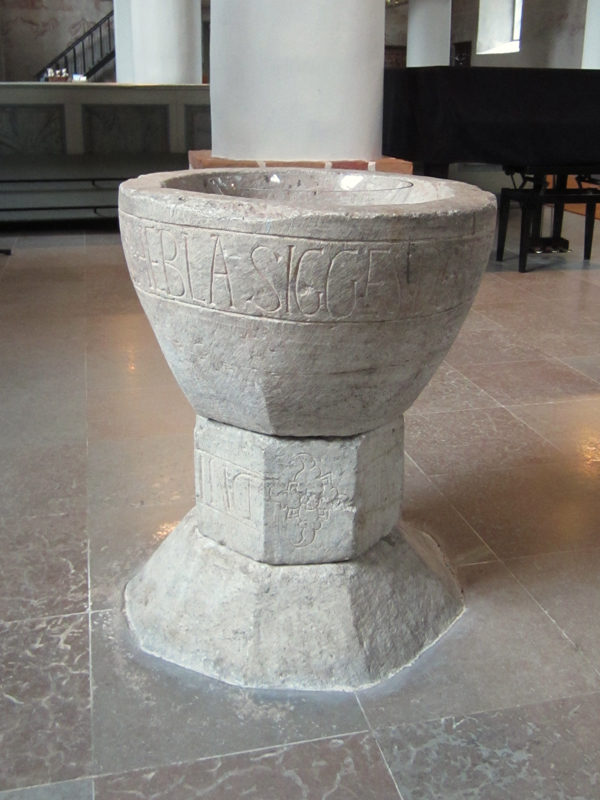
Baptismal font in St. Peter's Church in Siuntio.

Many objects were donated to St. Peter's Church in Siuntio by the Flemings. Among these objects survives a medieval baptismal font which was donated to the church by Hebbla Siggesdotter Sparre, widow to the Councillor of State Erik Fleming, in 1550. This baptismal font in lime stone was made by Tomas Tomasson from the city of Reval which is nowadays known as Tallinn. The baptismal font in Siuntio is one of the oldest objects connected to the medieval baptismal tradition in Finland.

=== Era of Reuterholm family ===
Between the years 1754 and 1813 Suitia Manor was owned by the noble family Reuterholm. Baron Esbjörn Reuterholm modernised the estate which had long been abandoned. The main building built out of gray stone, which originated from the 1540s, was partly demolished by Baron Reuterholm. New two-story living quarters were built out of brick. Only the cellar of the main building survived the modernisation and it to this day the only part of Suitia Manor that survives from the Middle Ages.

Baron Esbjörn Reuterholm's son Gustaf Adolf Reuterholm owned Suitia and Pickala manor houses in Siuntio. He acted as de facto regent of Sweden during the minor regency of Gustav IV Adolf of Sweden between 1792 and 1796. Gustaf Adolf Reuterholm died childless in 1813 and in his will he ordered the family burial chamber and chapel in St. Peter's Church in Siuntio to be emptied and the coffins and valuables to be moved to Strängnäs Cathedral because Sweden had lost the area of Finland to Russian Empire in the Finnish War. The family didn't want anything to do with Russia. The Reuterholm burial chamber was emptied and coffins with movables were moved to Sweden in 1815. The burial chapel still survives in St. Peter's church and acts nowadays as a sacristy. Baroness Reuterholm donated the current altar painting to the church and also that survives as a memory of the noble family Reuterholms time in Siuntio.

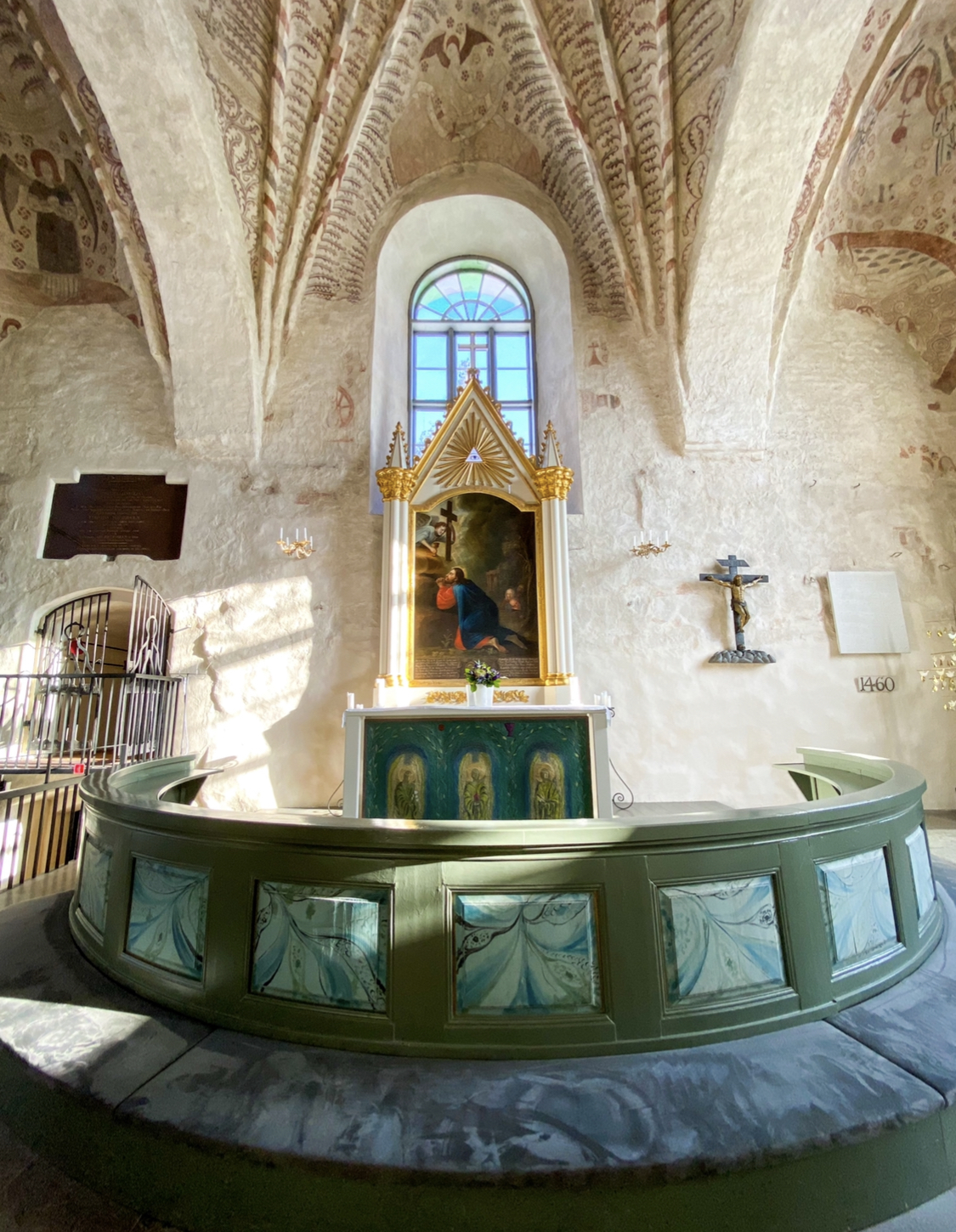
Altar painting in St. Peter's Church donated by baroness Reuterholm. Ports to the Reuterholm burial chapel on the left hand side.

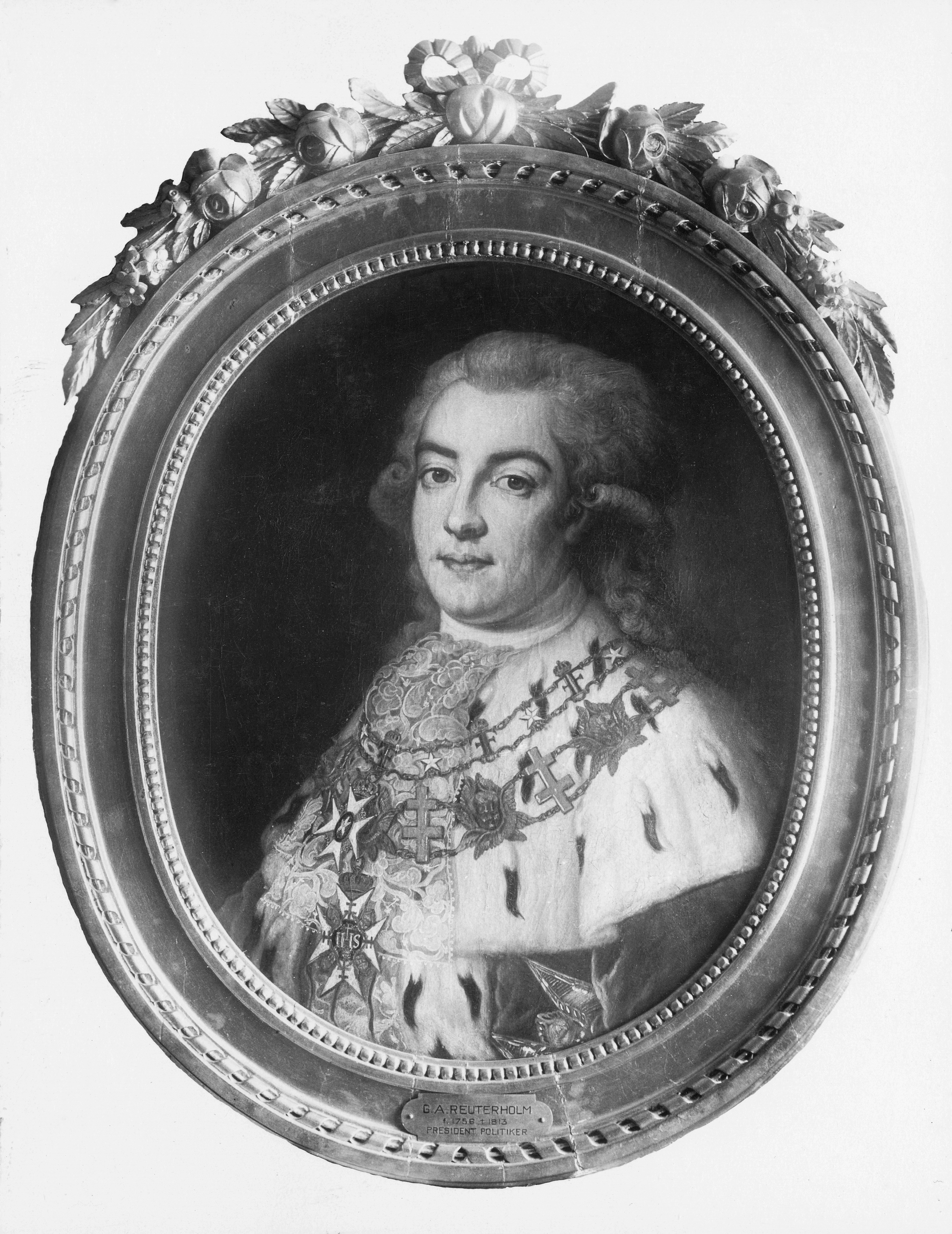
Gustav Adolf Reuterholm

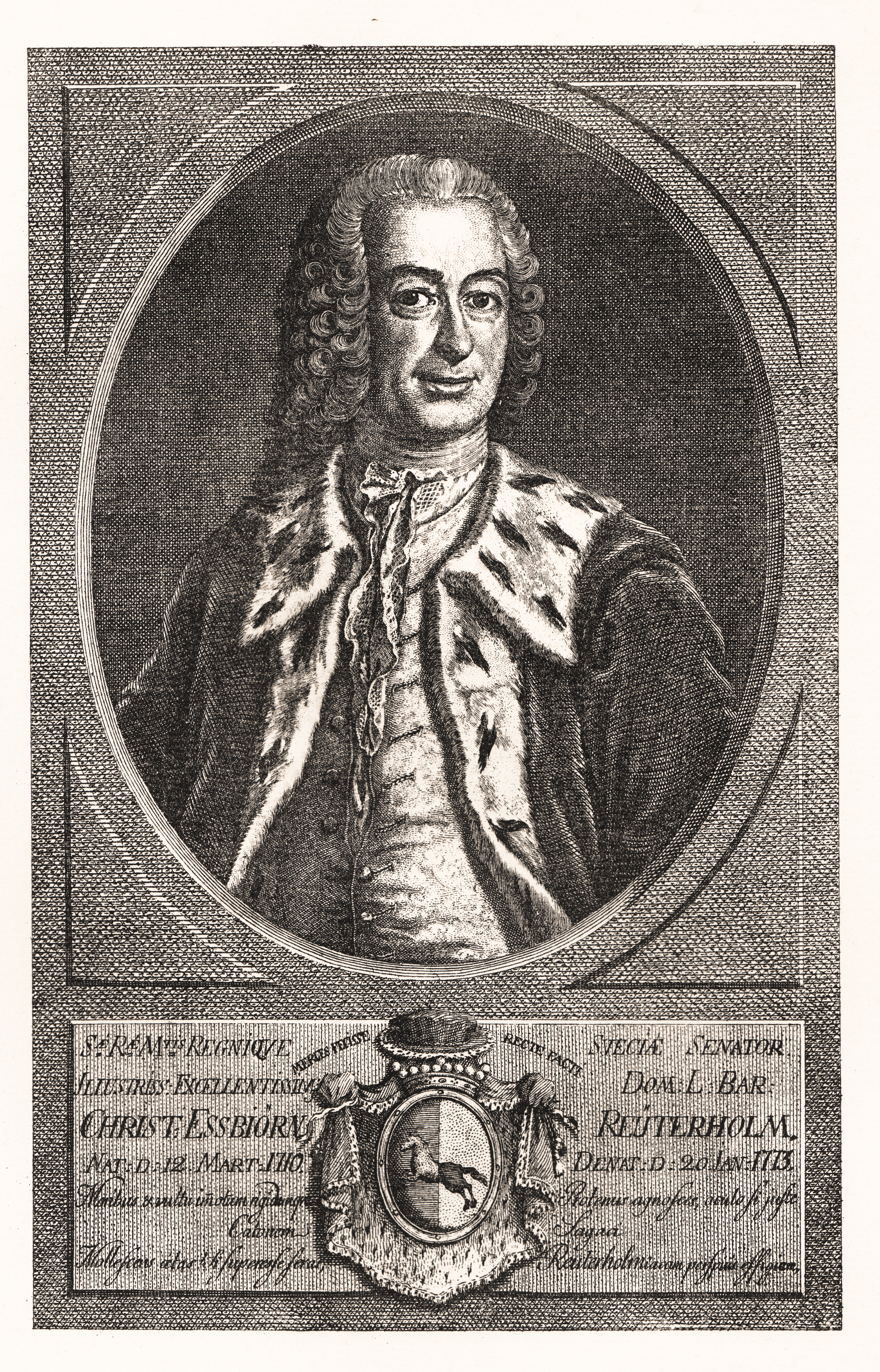
Esbjörn Reuterholm

=== 1800s and 1900s ===
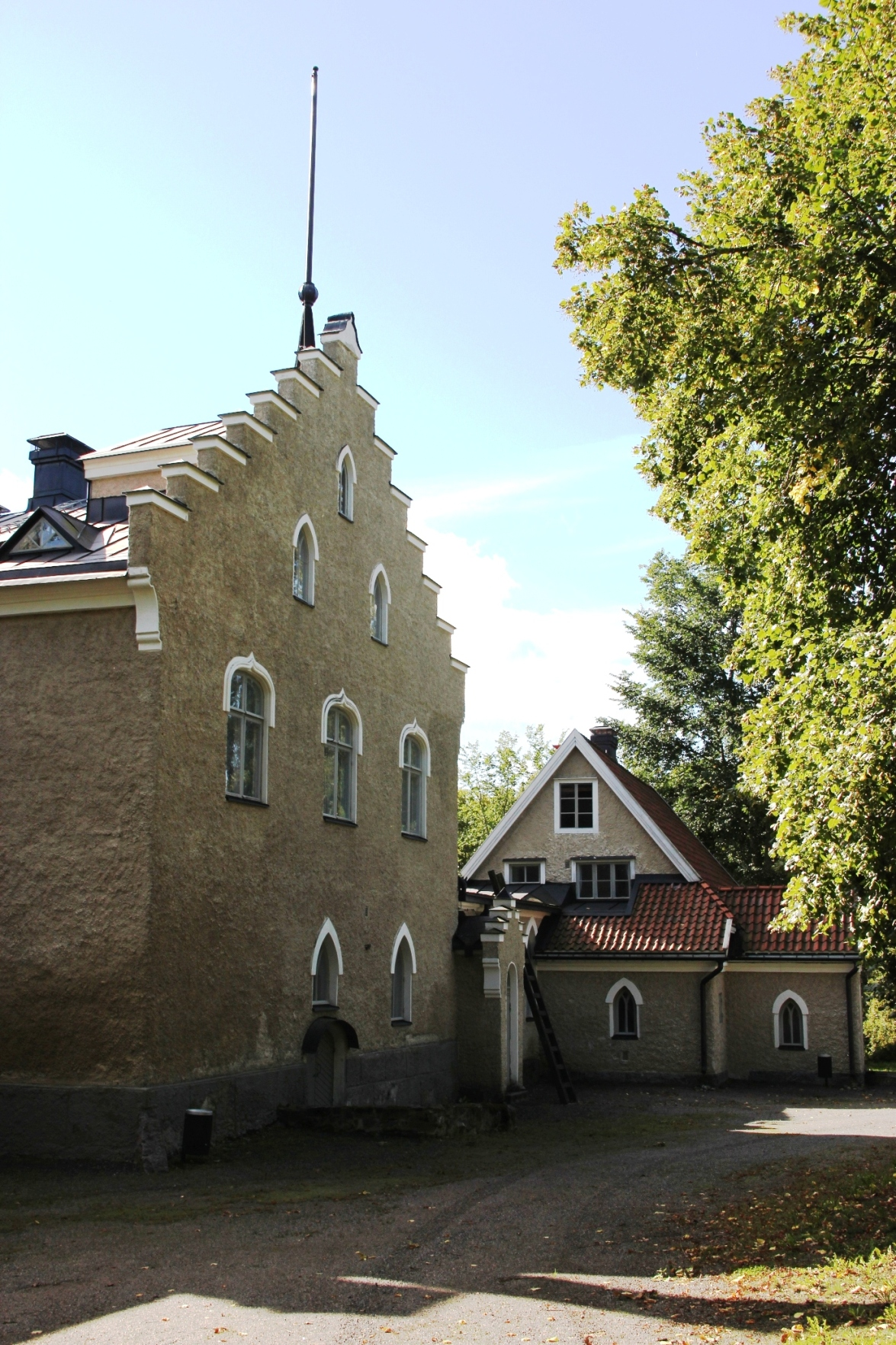
Suitia Manor with later kitchen addition.

In 1822 Suitia Manor was briefly owned by Claes Robert Favorin who sold it to lieutenant Karl Ludvig von Zansen. Lieutenant von Zansen owned Suitia between 1838 and 1874. After his death Suitia was inherited by lieutenant von Zansen's daughter Henriette von Zansen who married major-general Wilhelm von Kraemer. Von Kraemer sold Suitia to baron August Wrede af Elimä in 1898. Baron Wrede af Elimä renovated the main building in 1900 and the facade in gothic revival that we see today stems from that renovation.

During the Finnish Civil War in 1918 supporters of White Finland were sieged by the supporters of Red Finland at Suitia. Memorial plaque of the siege is shown on the wall of the manor house. Family Wrede af Elimä's private cemetery is located in the Manor House gardens whereas members of von Zansen family are buried at Siuntio Cemetery by the church.

Baron Wrede af Elimä was driven into economical difficulties and after he declared bankruptcy in 1933 the State of Finland redeemed Suitia Manor with its lands. After the redeeming of Suitia the Ministry of Social Affairs let the association for the invalids of Finnish Civil War use the manor for rehabilitation. In 1944 the manor was transferred to a non-profit veteran organisation called Sotainvalidien Veljesliitto.

=== 21st century ===
Between 1975 and 2007 Suitia manor acted as a research station for the faculty of agriculture and forestry in Helsinki University. In 2015 Suitia was sold to brothers Gustav and Henrik Rehnberg, who owned a nearby Gårdskulla estate, and known businessman Antti Herlin for 11.7 million euros. Herlin quickly sold his part to brothers Rehnberg who turned the estate into a private limited company. Suitia was used as a conference and event centre. However, in summer 2020 Suitia Manor with 8 hectares of land was put on sale for 4.8 million euros.

== Architecture ==
Suitia Manor's original main building built out of gray stone was built by riksråd Erik Fleming in 1540s. The construction work was led by stonemason Tomas Tomasson from Reval. It was Tomasson who made for example the open fireplace. The building has two storeys above a cellar. The outer walls of the building were over 1 meter thick in order to be able to better defend the manor house. Suitia Manor had at the time even four glass windows which were very rare during the 16th century.

In the beginning of the 1760s the owner of Suitia, Esbjörn Reuterholm, rebuilt the second story of the manor. The work was designed by master bricklayer Samuel Berner.

The current facade of the building was completed in 1906. The owner of Suitia at the time was baron August Wrede af Elimä who wanted the main building to resemble late gothic and medieval style. Baron Wrede af Elimä designed the alterations himself and wanted the main building be a reference to the noble family Felming's time at Suitia. Nowadays the manor looks more like a medieval castle rather than what it most likely had looked like originally.

The rooms in the ground floor were transformed into a knight hall and entrance hall. Baron Wrede af Elimä commissioned a painting from painter Axel Haartman which describes Battle of Kircholm to be painted on a wall in the knight hall. Carpenter Carl Edward Österblom carved coats of arms of the former owner families on the wooden wall panels of the knight hall. Wrede af Elimä commissioned also a kitchen wing to be built in 1906.

The main building was restored between 1997 and 1999 by University of Helsinki.

== Images ==
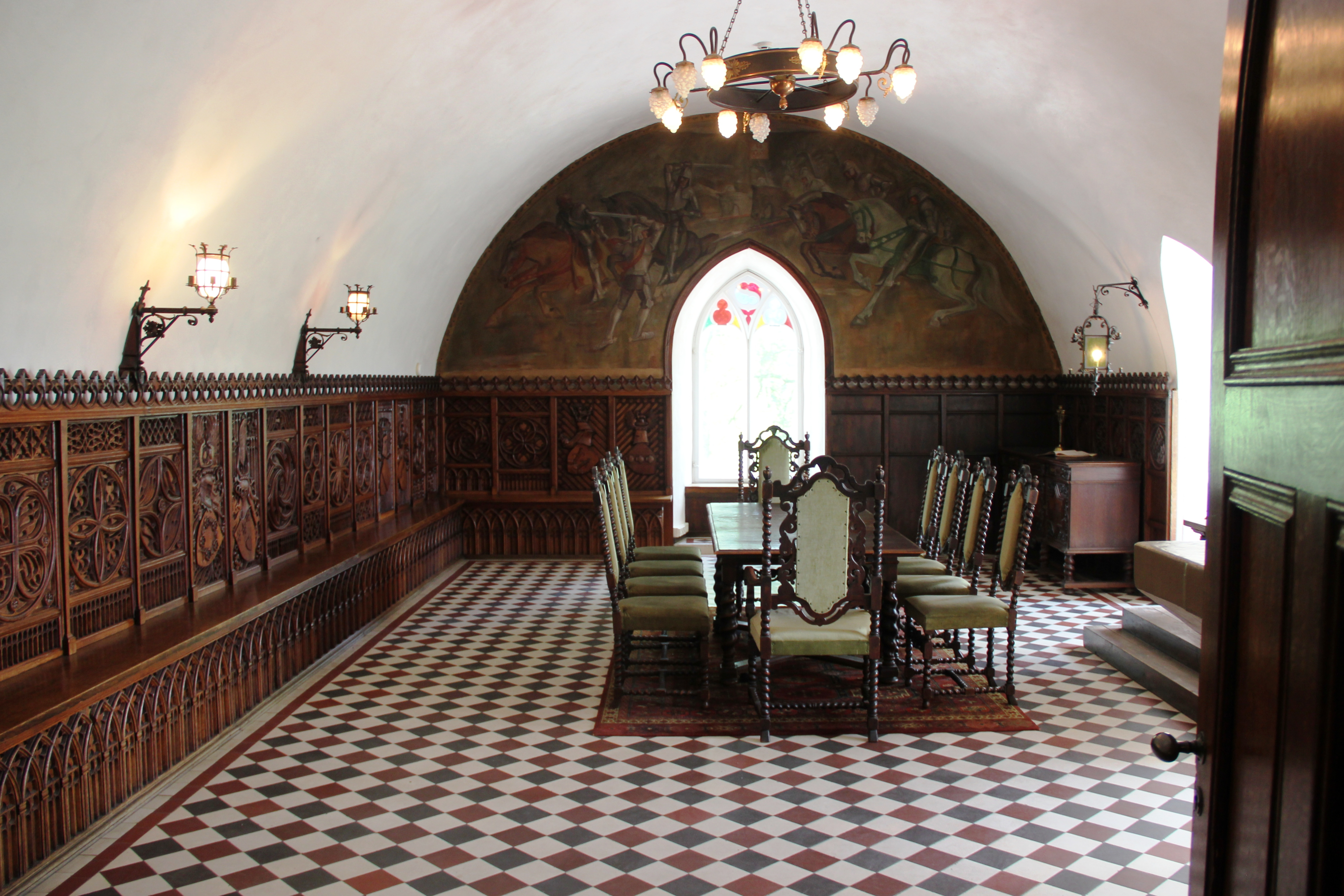
Knight hall in ground floor with painting of Battle of Kircholm.

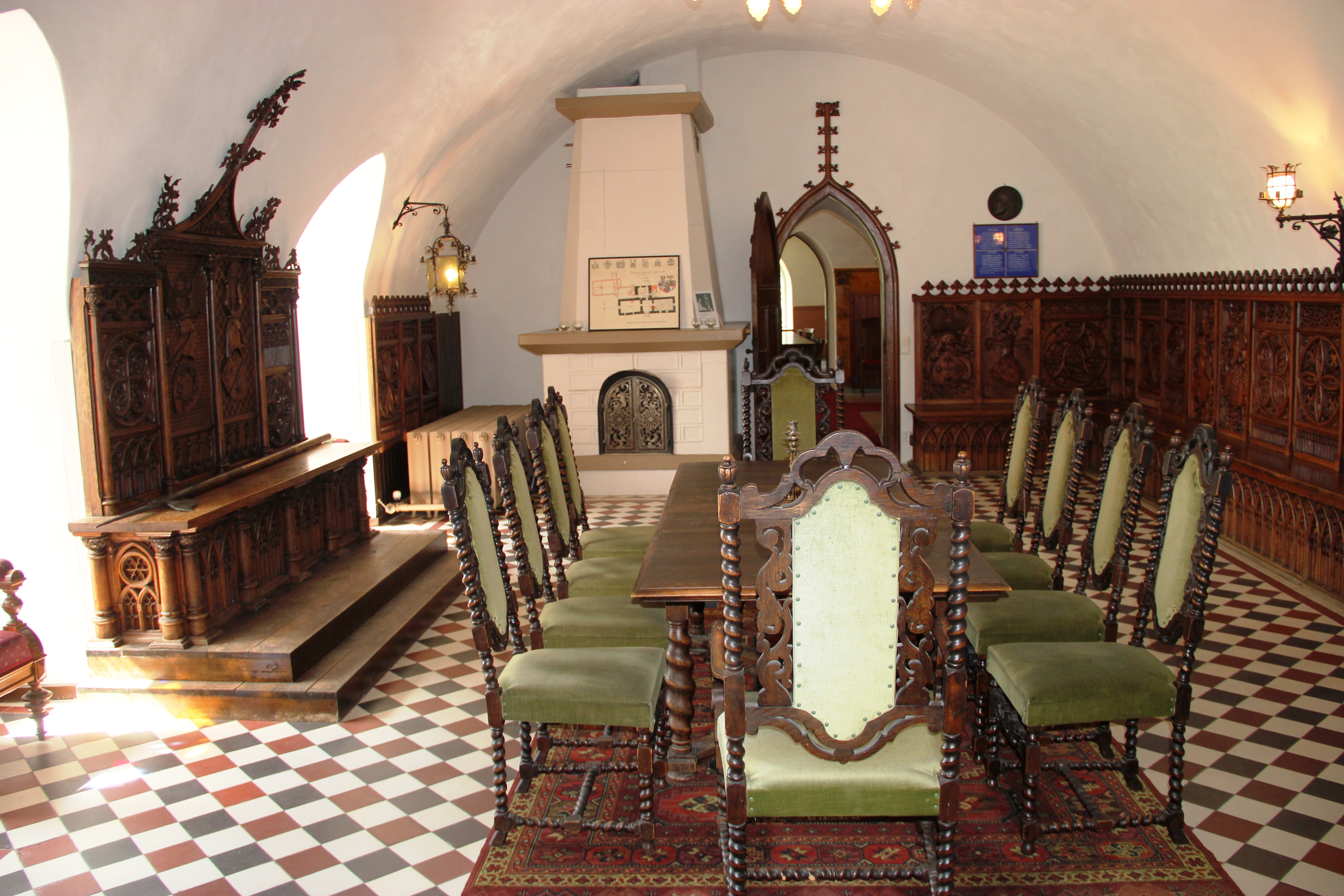
Knight hall.

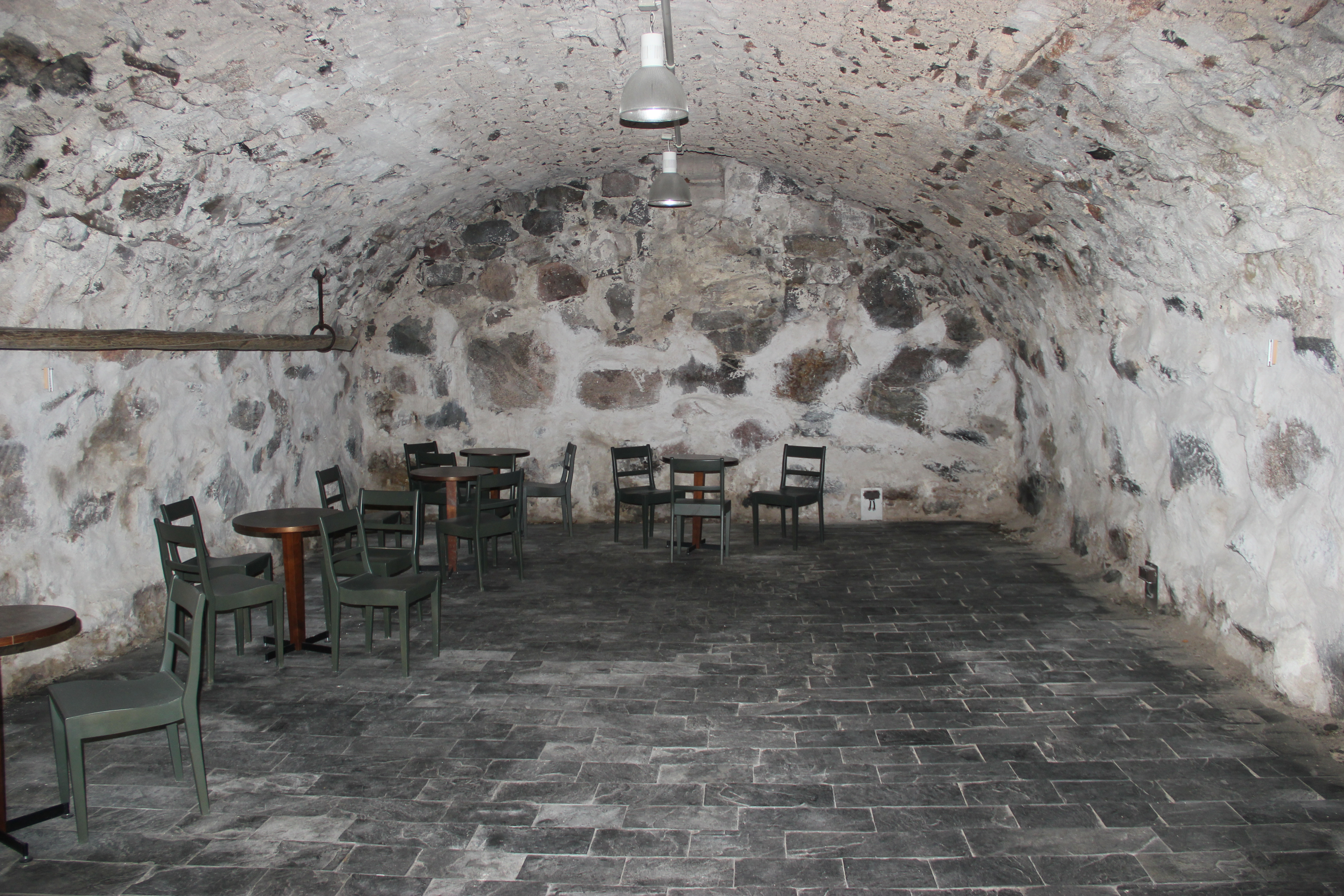
Part of the medieval cellar

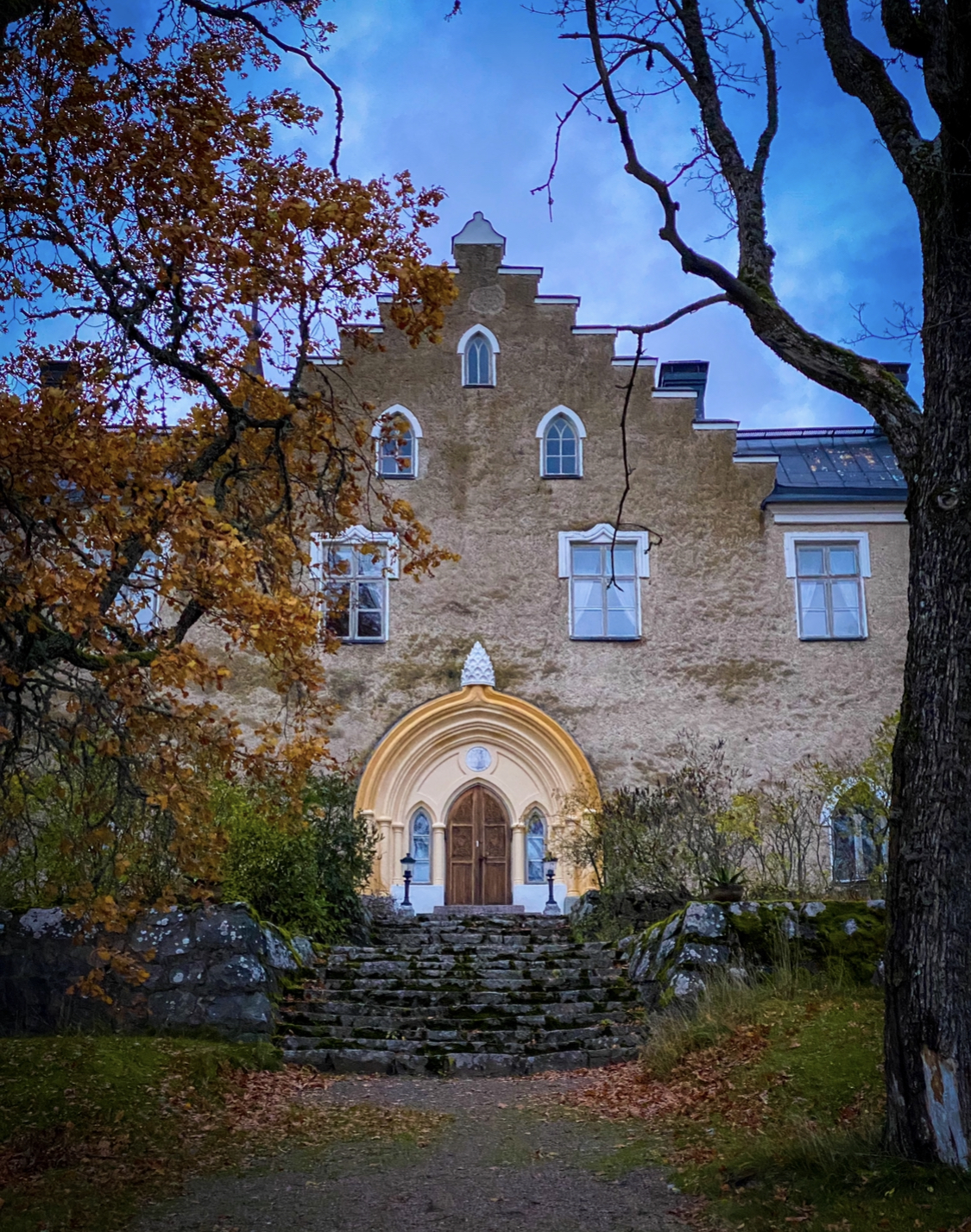
Main entrance in autumn.

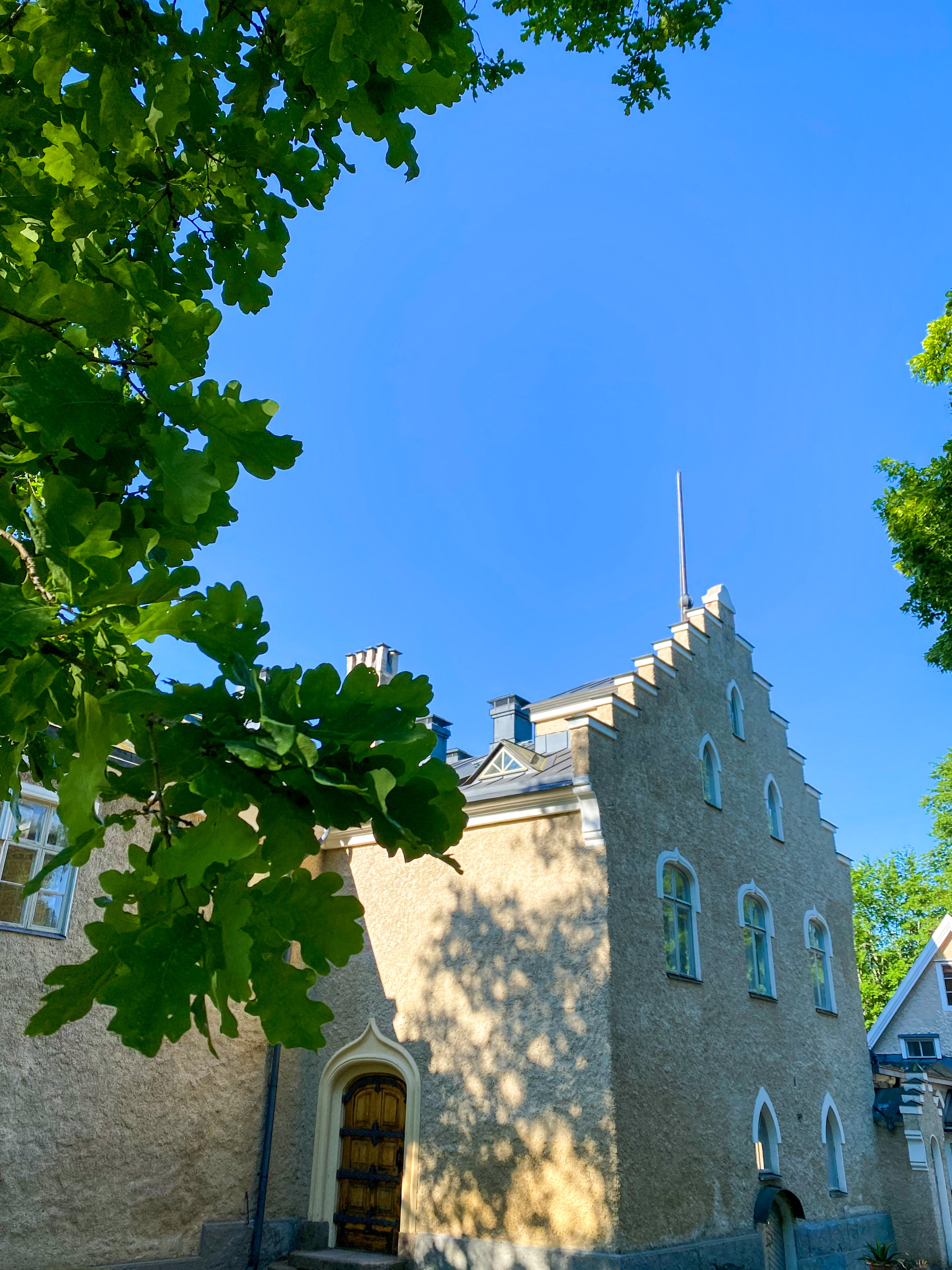
Back of the manor house

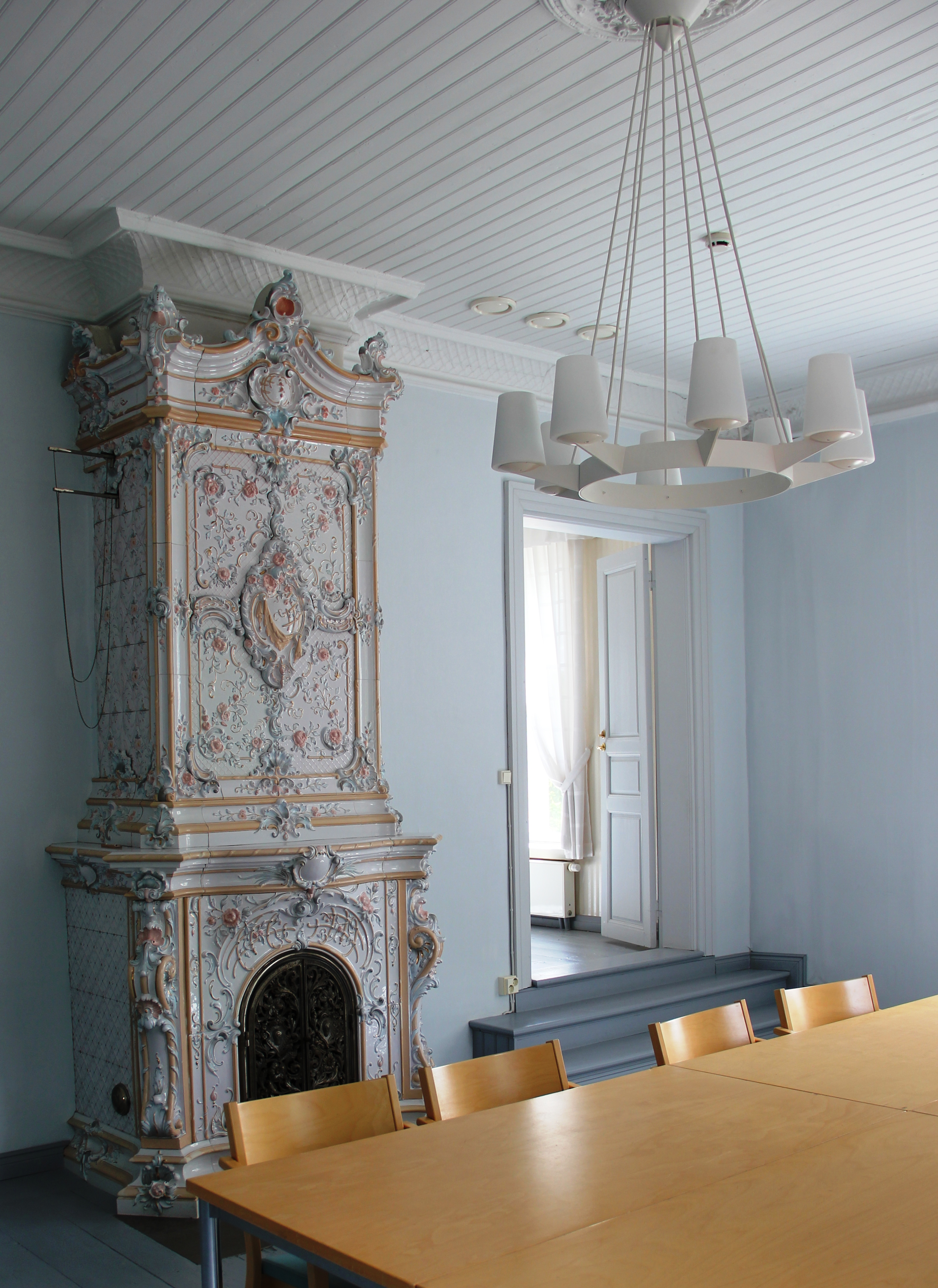
One of the rooms in the upper floor.

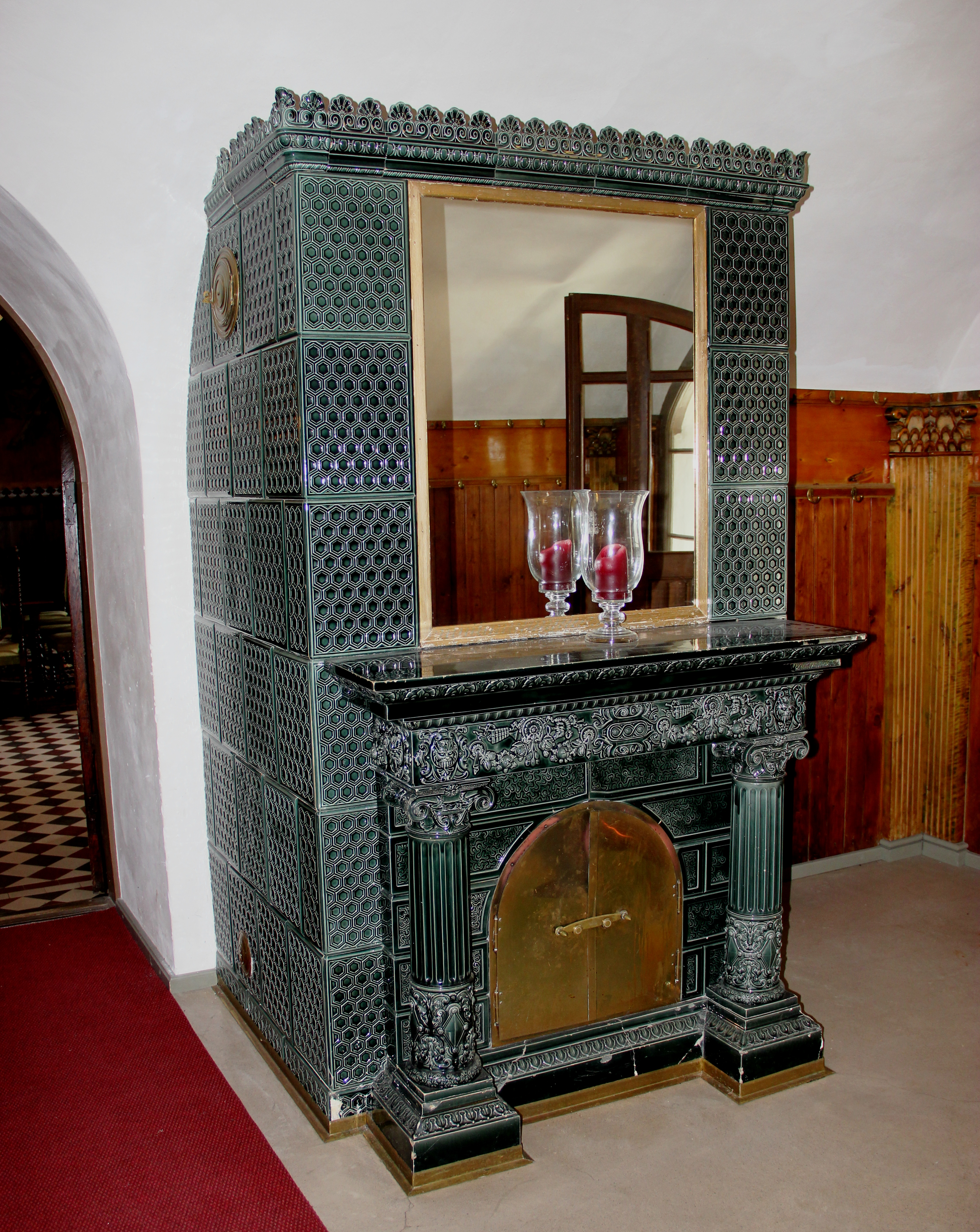
Fireplace in entrance hall.

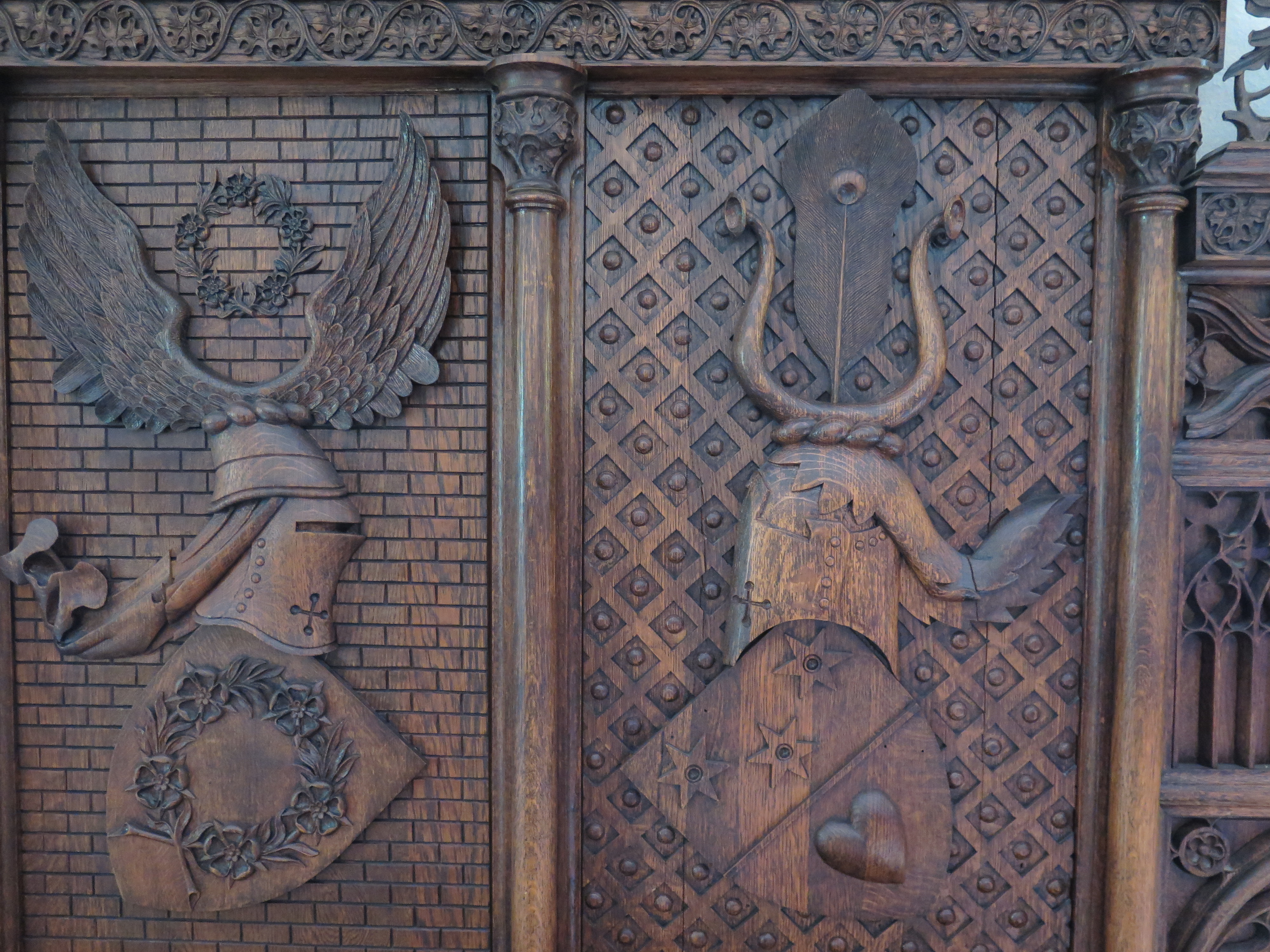
Coats of arms on the wall paneling of the knight hall.
