= St. Peter's Church, Siuntio =

Coordinates: 60°10′38″N 24°12′15″E

St. Peter's Church in Siuntio
- Sjundeå S:t Petri kyrka / Siuntion Pyhän Pietarin kirkko
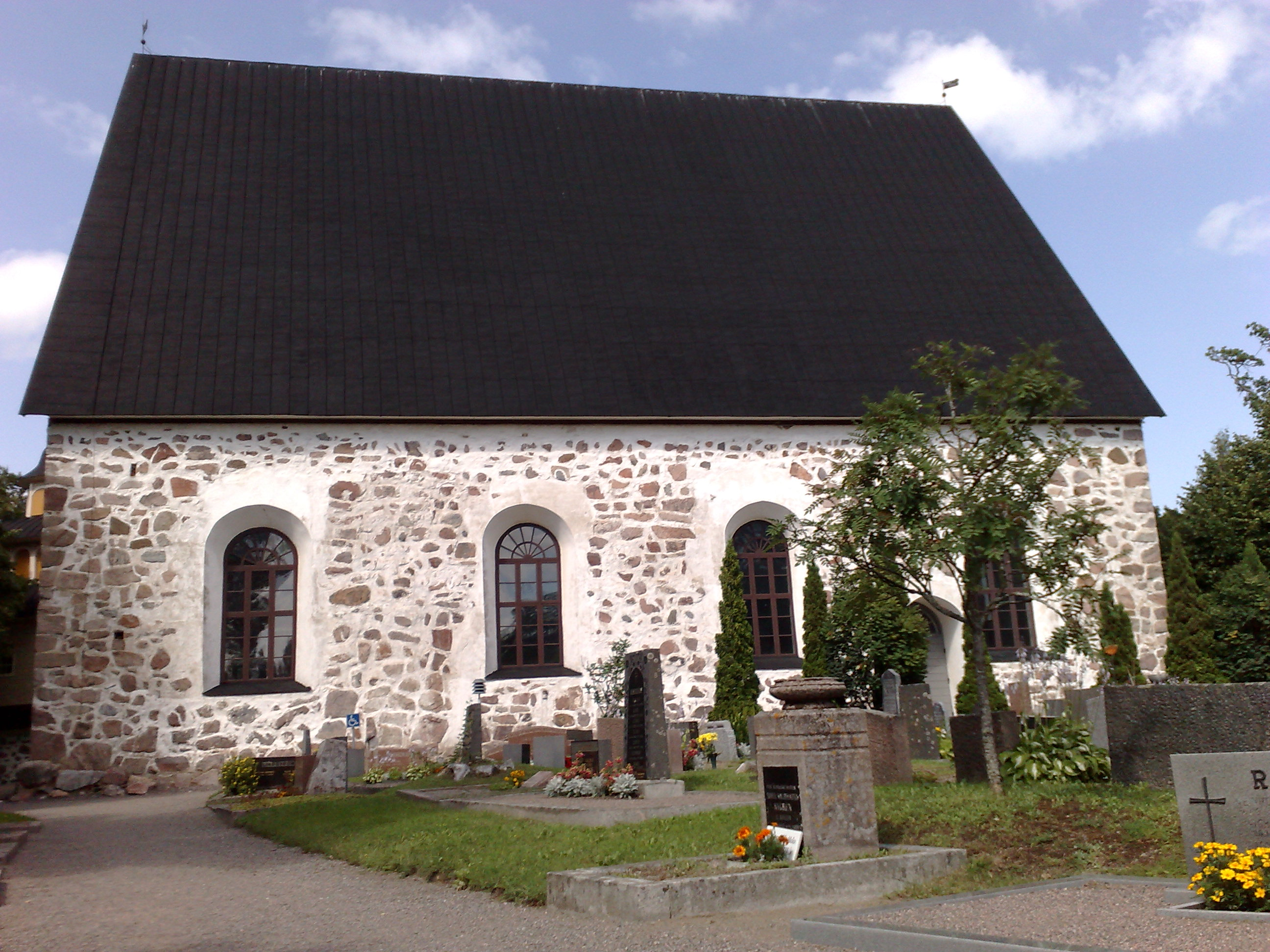
- Southern wall of St. Peter's Church
- St. Peter's Church in Siuntio
- Location: Siuntio, Uusimaa
- Country: Finland
- Denomination: Evangelical Lutheran Church of Finland
- Previous denomination: Catholic

History
- Dedication: St. Peter

Architecture
- Architectural type: Gothic
- Years built: Between 1460 and 1480

Specifications
- Capacity: seats 350
- Materials: Grey stone

Administration
- Province: Uusimaa
- Diocese: Espoo and Borgå
- Parish: Finnish-speaking and Swedish-speaking parishes of Siuntio

Siuntio St. Peter's Church (fin. Siuntion Pyhän Pietarin kirkko, swe. Sjundeå S:t Petri kyrka) is a gothic medieval stone church in Siuntio, Uusimaa, Finland, located in the old church village of Siuntio. The church is built out of grey stone between the years 1460 and 1480 next to a small stone chapel which was owned by a nearby Suitia Manor. St. Peter's Church is divided into three naves by three pairs of pilars that hold the brick vaults.

The church is owned by the Parish Union of Siuntio and shared by the Finnish-speaking and Swedish-speaking Evangelical-Lutheran parishes of Siuntio. The church is part of both the Diocese of Espoo and the Diocese of Borgå since the Finnish-speaking parish is part of the Espoo Diocese and the Swedish-speaking parish is part of the Borgå Diocese.

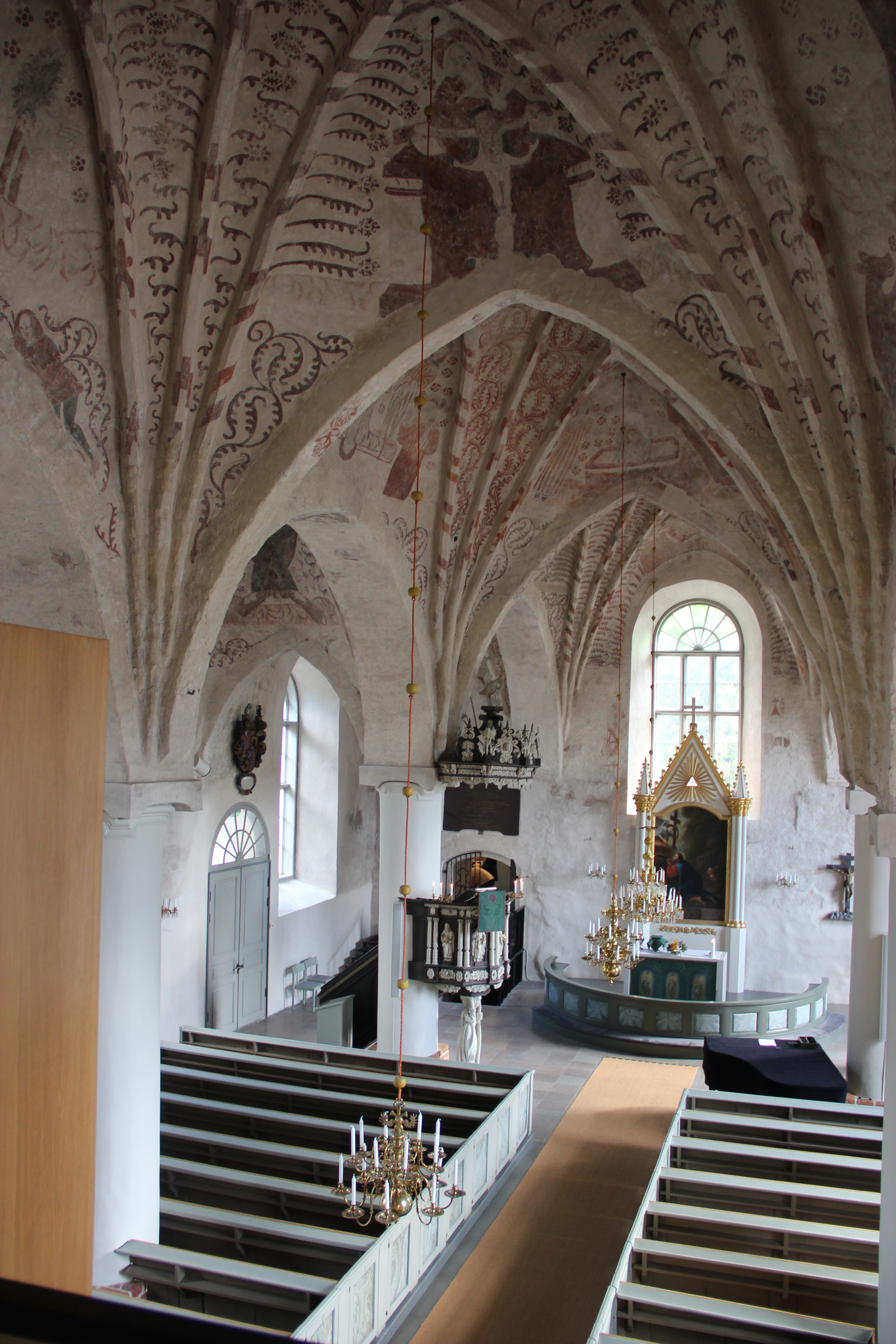
Inside the church

The church has been ravaged by fire four times.

== History ==
=== Catholic period ===
St. Peter's Church was built next to Suitia Manor's stone chapel between 1460s and 1480s. The old chapel from the 14th century was transformed into sacristy. Originally the church was Roman Catholic. In the beginning of the 16th century the wooden ceiling inside the church was replaced with large brick vaults. Archeologist have found traces of a medieval altar and two side altars.

During catholic period paintings describing biblical legends were painted on the walls and vaults of the church.

According to 20th-century history books by Favorin and Brenner, St Peter’s Church was struck by lightning in 1526, which caused a major fire in the building. However, the exact year of the fire has been questioned by more recent research.

=== Reformation ===
During Reformation the medieval paintings on the walls and vaults were not overpainted. Not many objects were either confiscated to the Swedish Crown and no sculptures picturing saints were destroyed.

The church caught fire again in 1617.

=== The Great Northern War ===
Siuntio St. Peter's Church was badly damaged during the Great Northern War. The church was robbed and the bell tower was destroyed. Even the church bells were taken. The vicar and the chaplain fled to Sweden and only the chaplain's assistant stayed in Siuntio. It was only during the 1730s when the reparation of the church was able to be carried out.

=== Age of Enlightenment ===
The church was burning once again in 1823. After the fire St. Peter's church was heavily modified following the eras architectural ideals in the Grand Duchy of Finland; the windows were enlarged and the pilars holding the medieval vaults were rounded. The oldest part of the church, the former Suitia Manor's chapel, was torn down together with the church porch. Also the medieval paintings were painted over with white oil paint.

=== The 21st Century ===
In December 2023 a new climate-friendly heating system was installed, replacing the old system which used oil as an energy source. The project was partly financed by the Church Council of Finland through the Church Central Fund for Climate Neutral Energy Systems. In July 2024 the Parish Union of Siuntio announced that the roof of the church is going to be renovated during the same year. The renovation, which was estimated to cost around 600 000 euros, was completed in December 2024. 52 % of the total cost is covered by the Finnish Church Council.

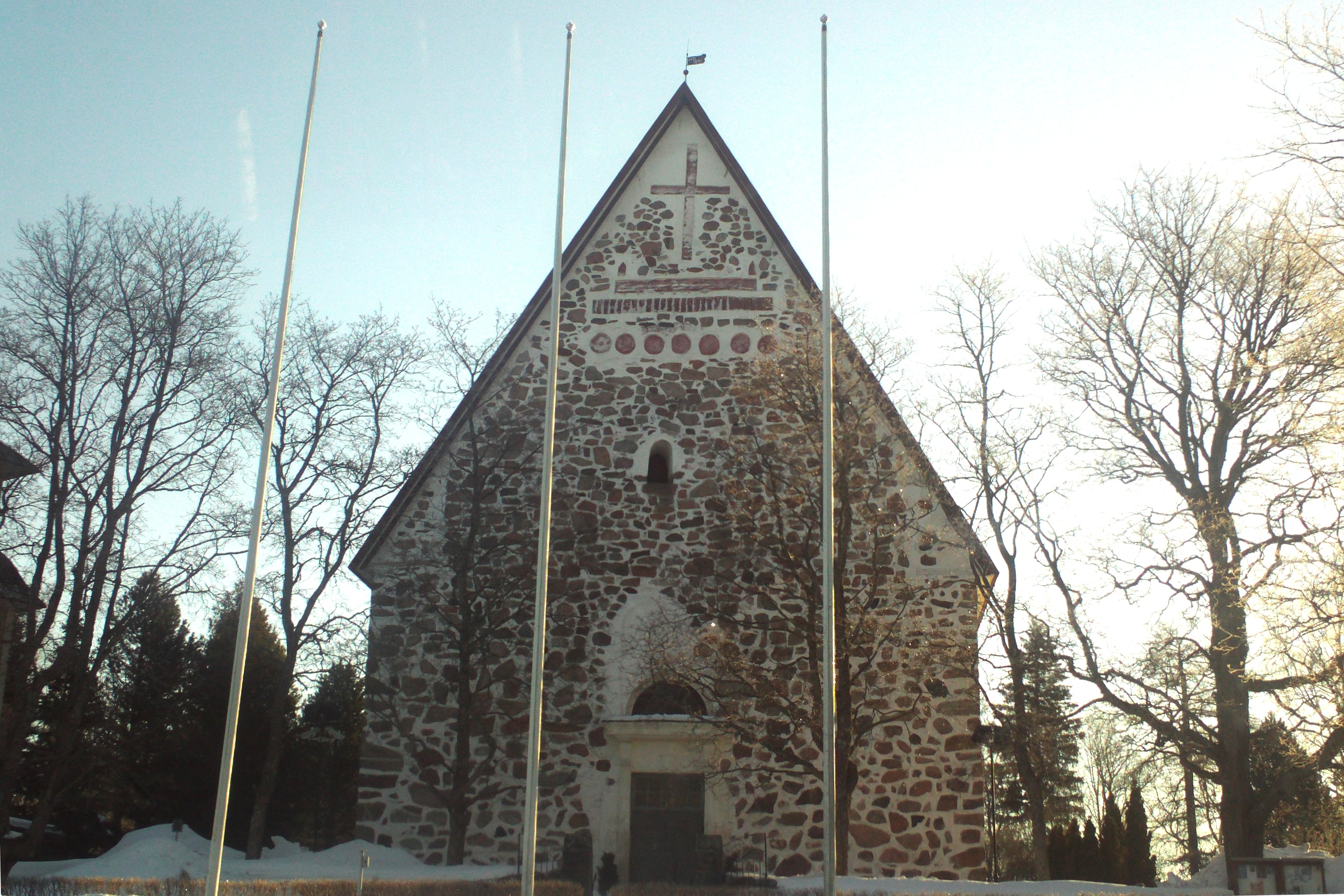
St. Peter's Church during winter

== Church paintings ==
The paintings on the vaults and walls of the St. Peter's Church were painted in two phases during the end of the 15th century and the beginning of the 16th century. The paintings told the biblical stories for the illiterate part of the population.

The oldest paintings are the consecration crosses from the end of the 15th century. There are altogether six consecration crosses remaining in the church. The later paintings are paintings of the biblical legends and saints and these paintings were painted during the beginning of the 16th century.

The paintings were never over painted during the Reformation but later during the Age of Enlightenment. In 1938 the parish decided to restore the old paintings but sadly they were badly damaged especially on the walls.

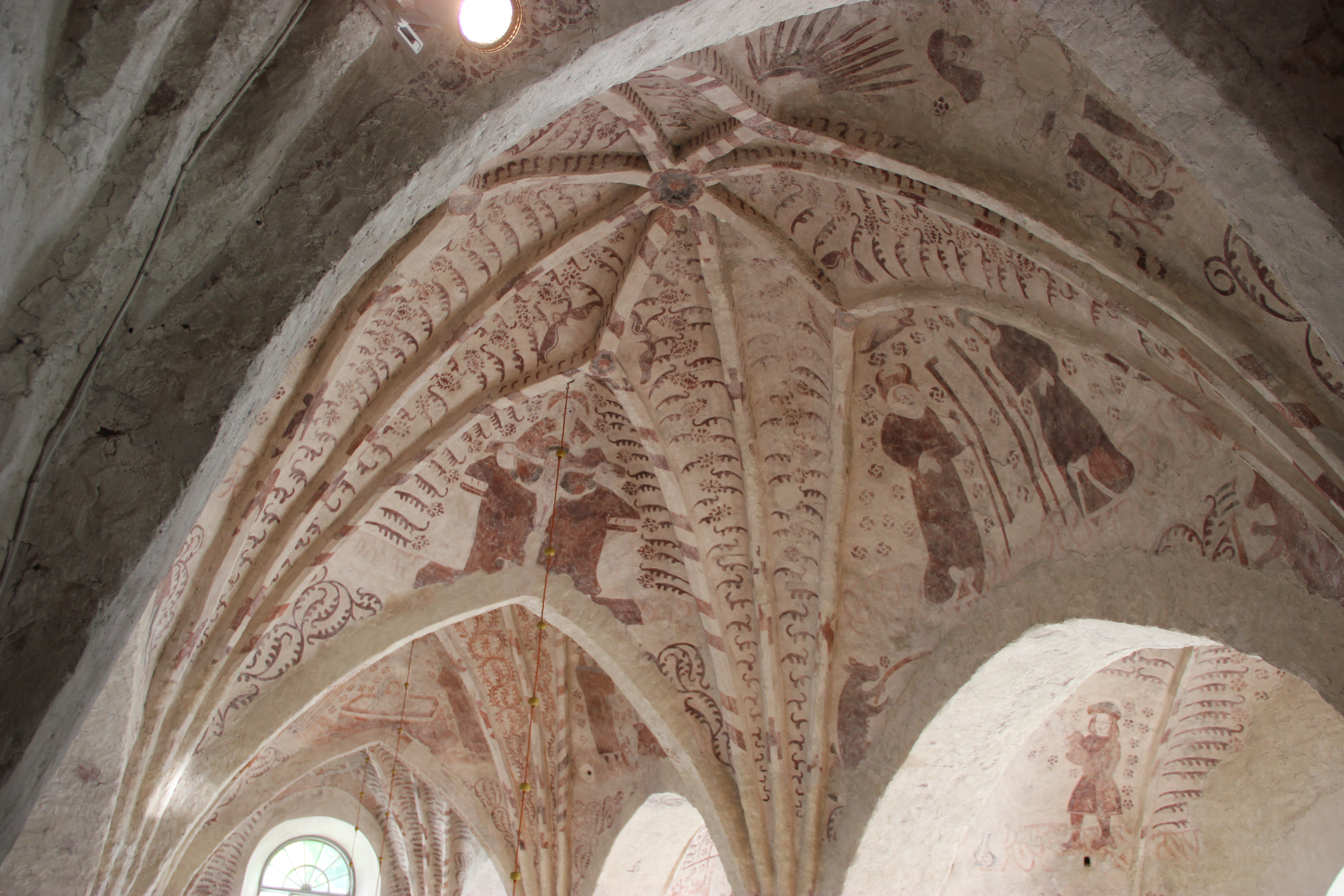
Vault paintings inside the church

=== Rare paintings in the church ===
There is one rare motif among the paintings of St. Peter's Church. A man with all seven deadly sins coming out if his mouth in forms of snakes is depicted on one of the vaults.

== Interior ==
=== Pulpits ===
There are two pulpits from the 17th century in St. Peter's Church.

The older one is so called Pulpit of Tott from the year 1625. There are only a few parts remaining of this pulpit and these parts are on display in the church. The Pulpit of Tott was donated to the church by lord of the Sjundby Manor, Åke Tott, and the Queen Consort Catherine of Sweden. The pulpit has coats of arms of Queen Catherine, the House of Tott and the House of Vasa painted on it.

The newer pulpit was donated by president of the Royal Court in Turku, baron Ernst Johan Creutz in 1683. This pulpit is a replica of a pulpit that once stood in the Cathedral of Turku down to the fire of Turku during the 17th century. The pulpit was made by Henrik Mattsson Leino and Matts Reiman. The pulpit is considered to be the greatest pulpit that Reiman ever made.

=== Baptismal font ===
The baptismal font, made out of limestone, is from medieval era; it was donated to the church by lady Hebbla Siggesdotter Sparre in memory of his husband Councilor of the State, lord Erik Fleming, who owned the Suitia Manor, in 1550. This baptismal font is the latest item linked to the medieval baptism tradition in Finland.

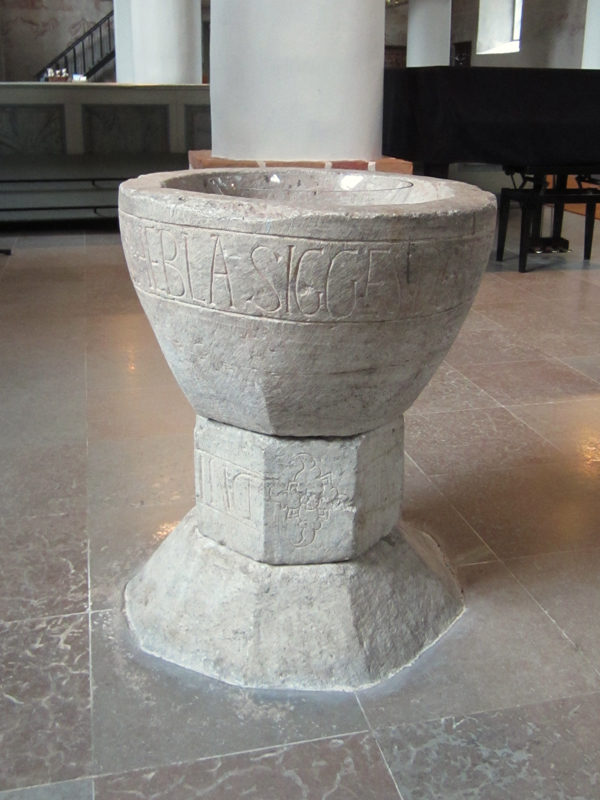
Batismal font from the year 1550

=== Coats of arms ===
There were altogether 34 coats of arms that belonged to different noble houses in the church, but only three remain to this day. The coats of arms were used to commemorate the deceased member of the family who was buried under the church floor to family grave. After the burial the coat of arms was hanged on the wall of the church.

The remaining coats of arms are:

- Baron Ernst Johan Creutz
- Otto Mauritz Krebs
- Margareta Anrep af Soor

=== Burial chapel ===
In 1774 lady Maria Gyllenstierna af Lundholm was granted permission to build a burial chapel out of granite in touch to the church. When Finland became under rule of the Russian Empire, the Reuterholm family emptied the chapel and left for Sweden. They didn't want anything to do with Finland anymore.

After the fire in 1823, the sacristy was moved to the then-already empty burial chapel.

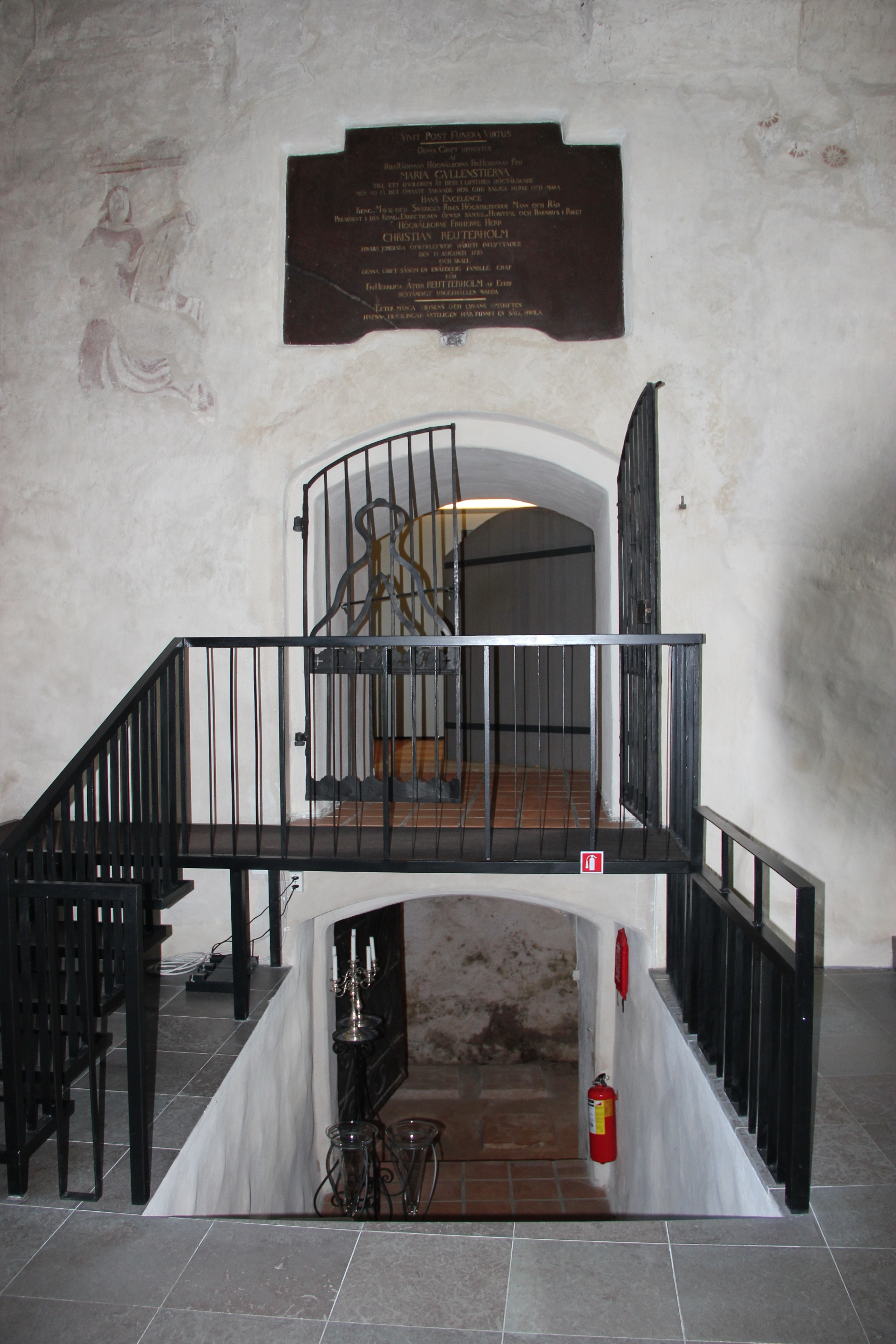
Doors inside the church leading to the former burial chapel

=== Altar painting ===
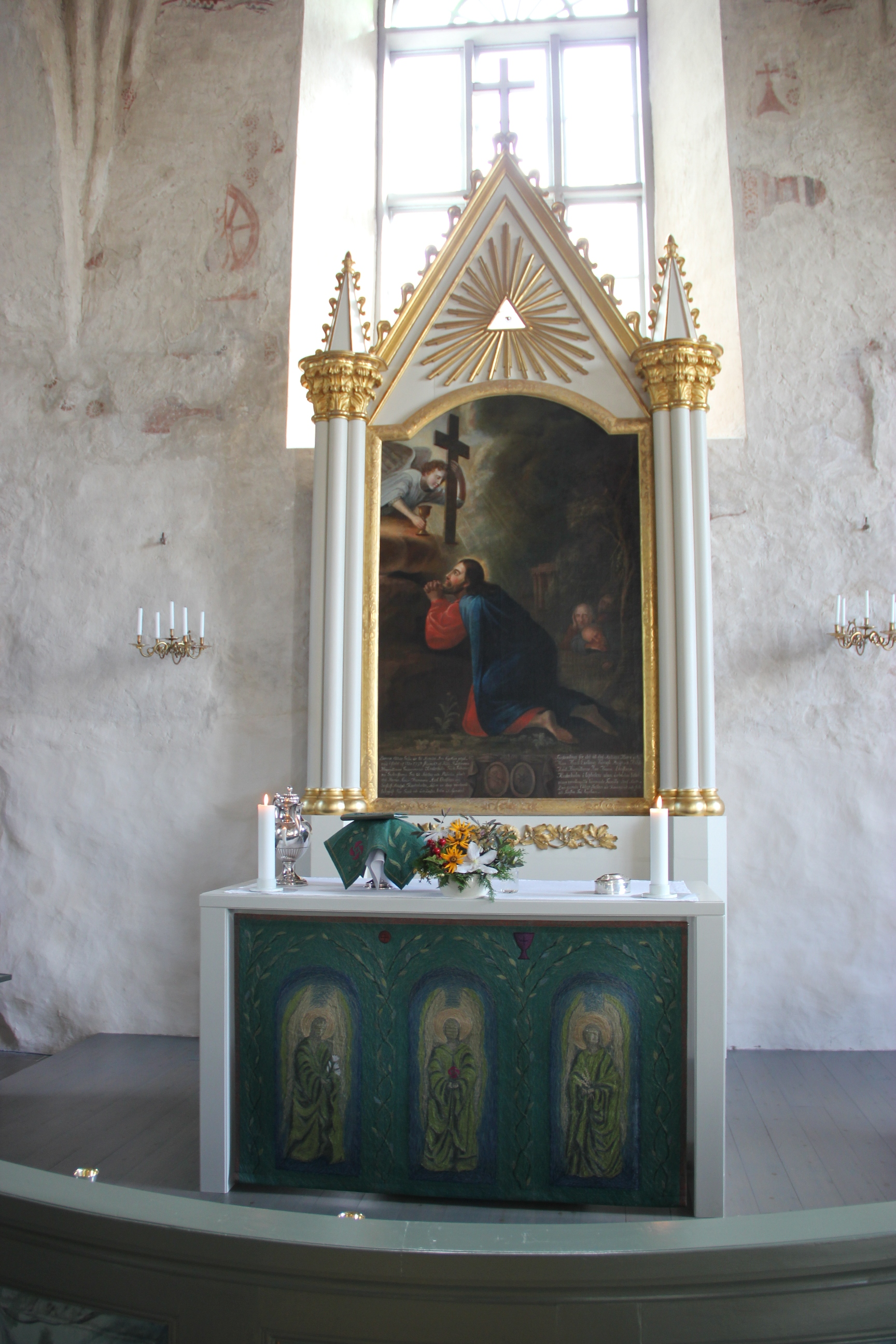
The altar painting from the year 1773

The altar painting in Siuntio church represents Jesus in Gethsemane. The painting was donated to the church by Baroness Gyllenstierna af Lundholm in 1773 for payment of the burial chapel. The painting has been painted in Stockholm but the artist is unknown. The altar painting is decorated with coats of arms of the Reuterholm and the Gyllenestjerna families.

=== Organ ===
Siuntio St. Peter's Church was the first rural church in Finland to get its own organ. This happened in 1786. The current organ is the church's third organ, and it is made by organ factory Paul Ott from Germany in 1971.

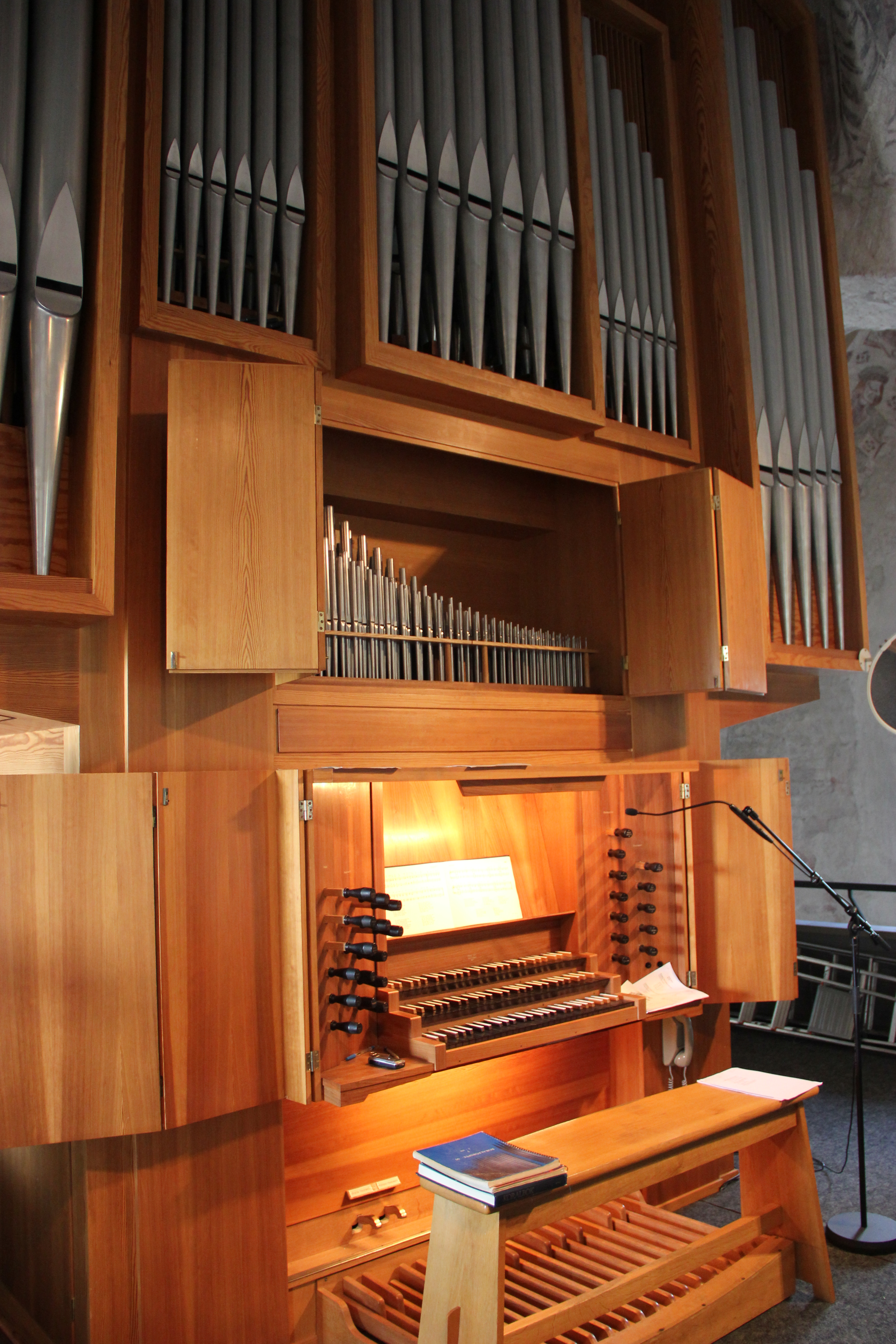
Organ

=== Church textiles ===
The newest church textiles have been made by textile artist Helena Vaari in 2009 after the renovation of the church.

== Images ==
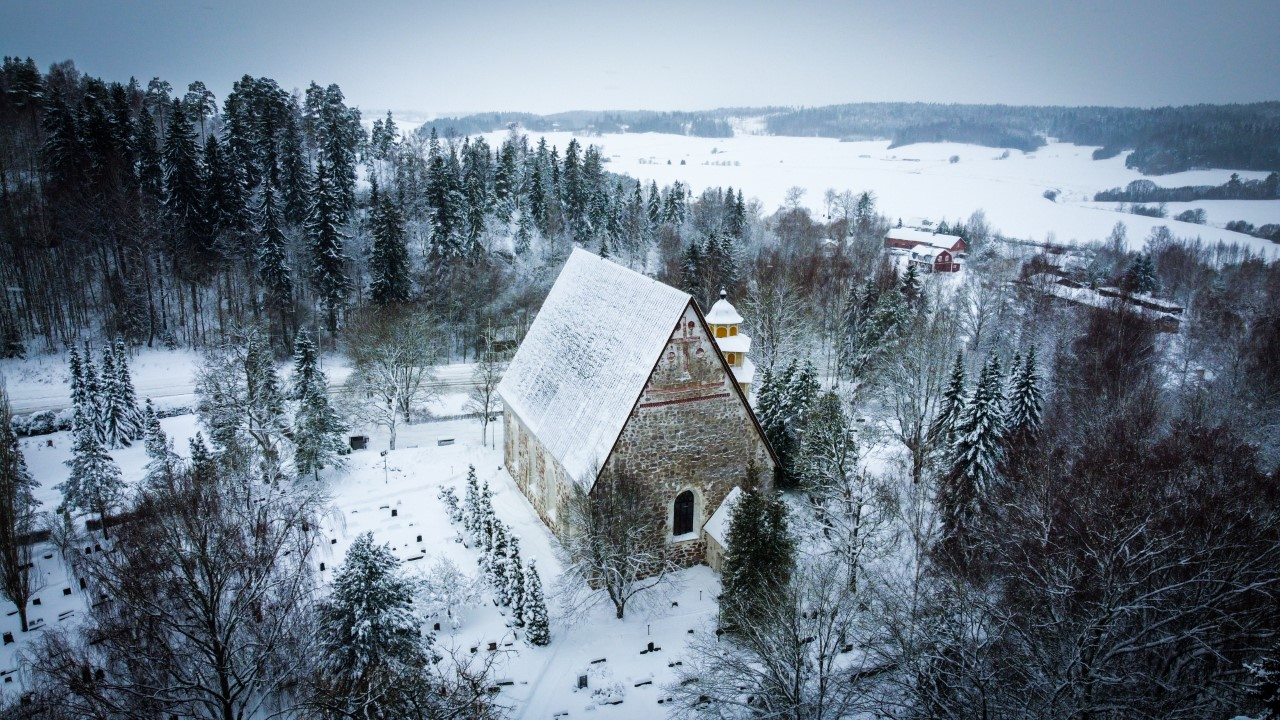
St. Peter's Church in winter.

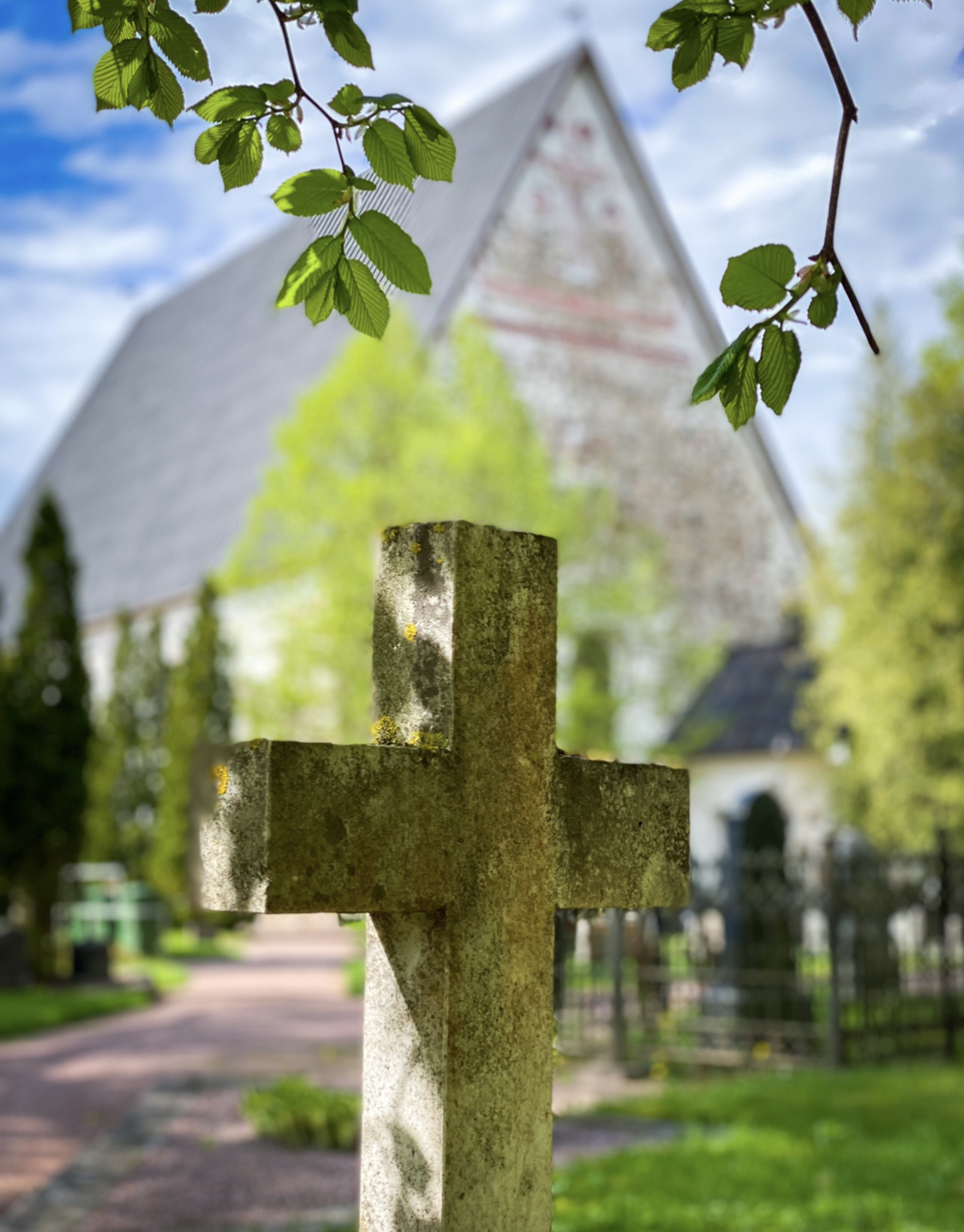
Eastern facade of the church seen from the cemetery.

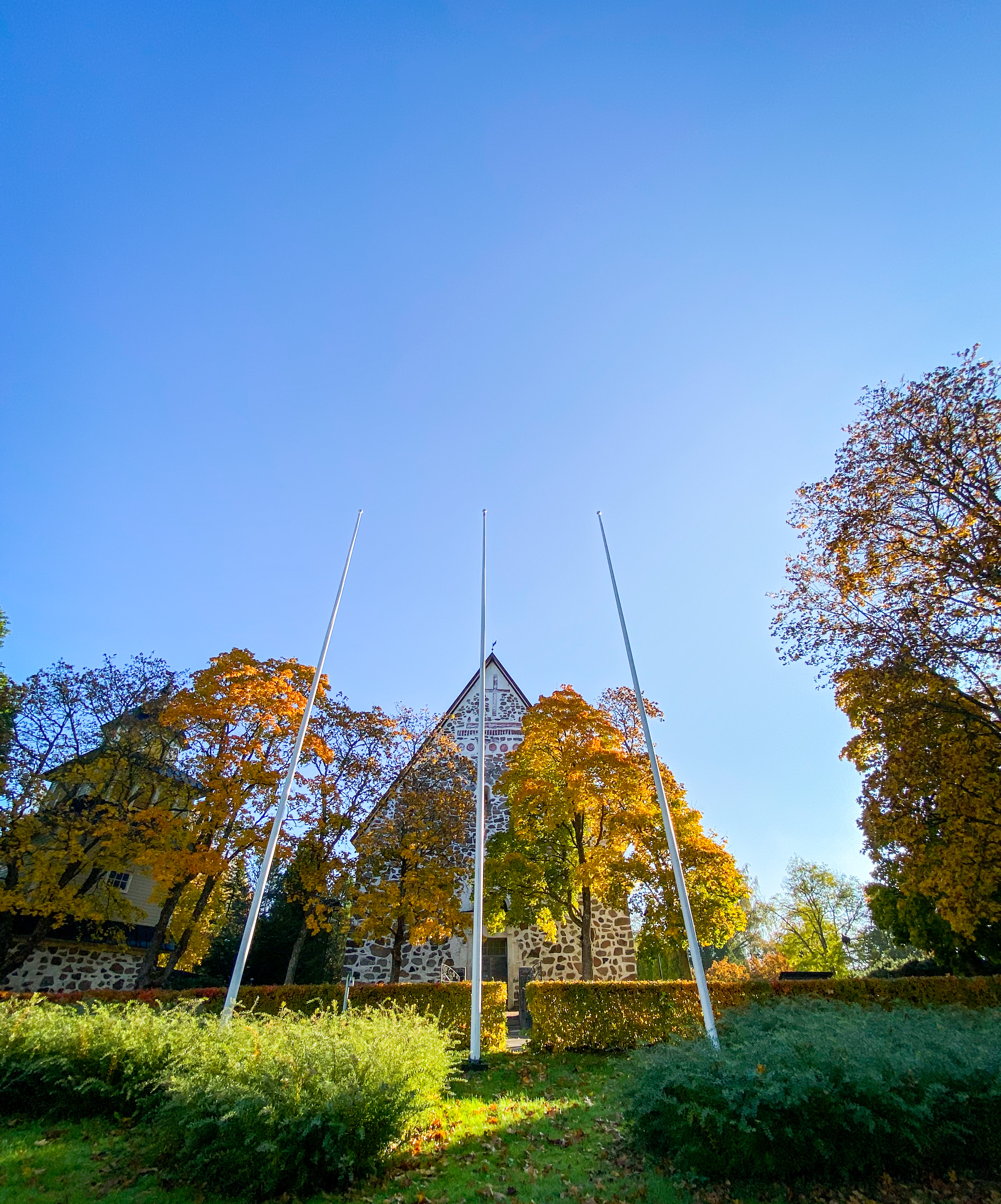
Western facade of the church.

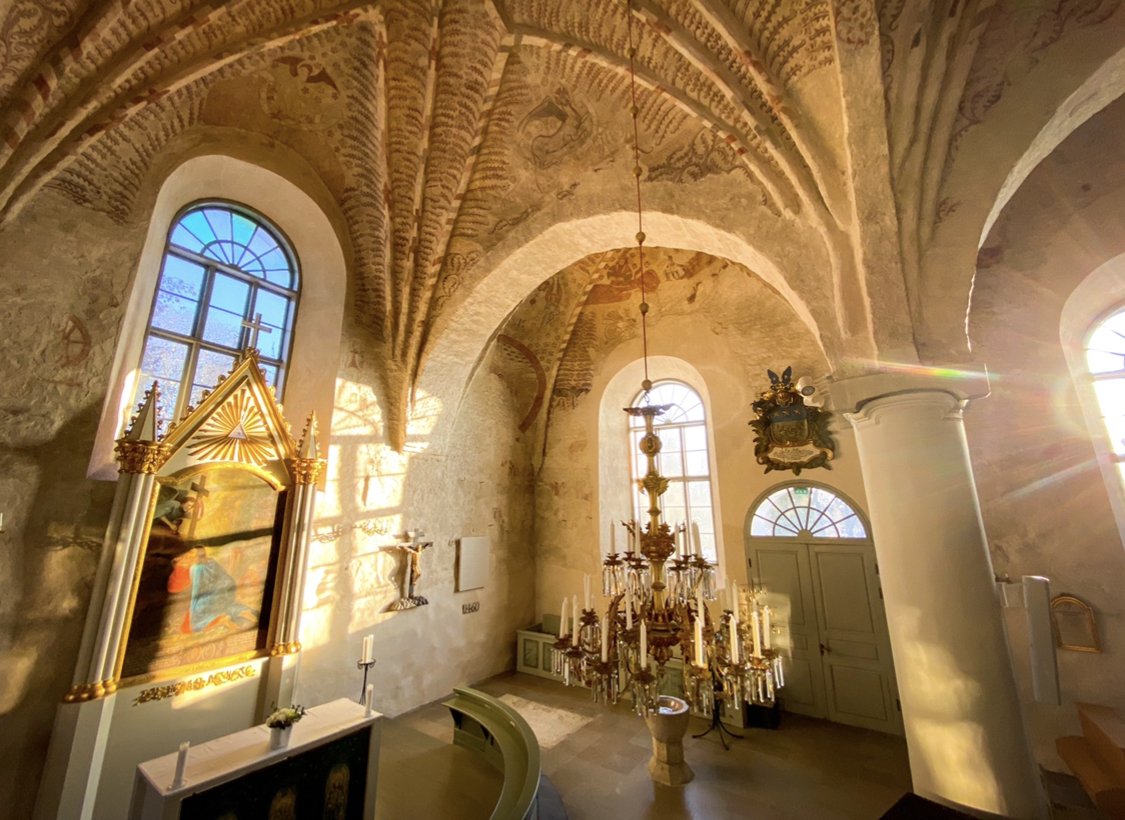
Choir.

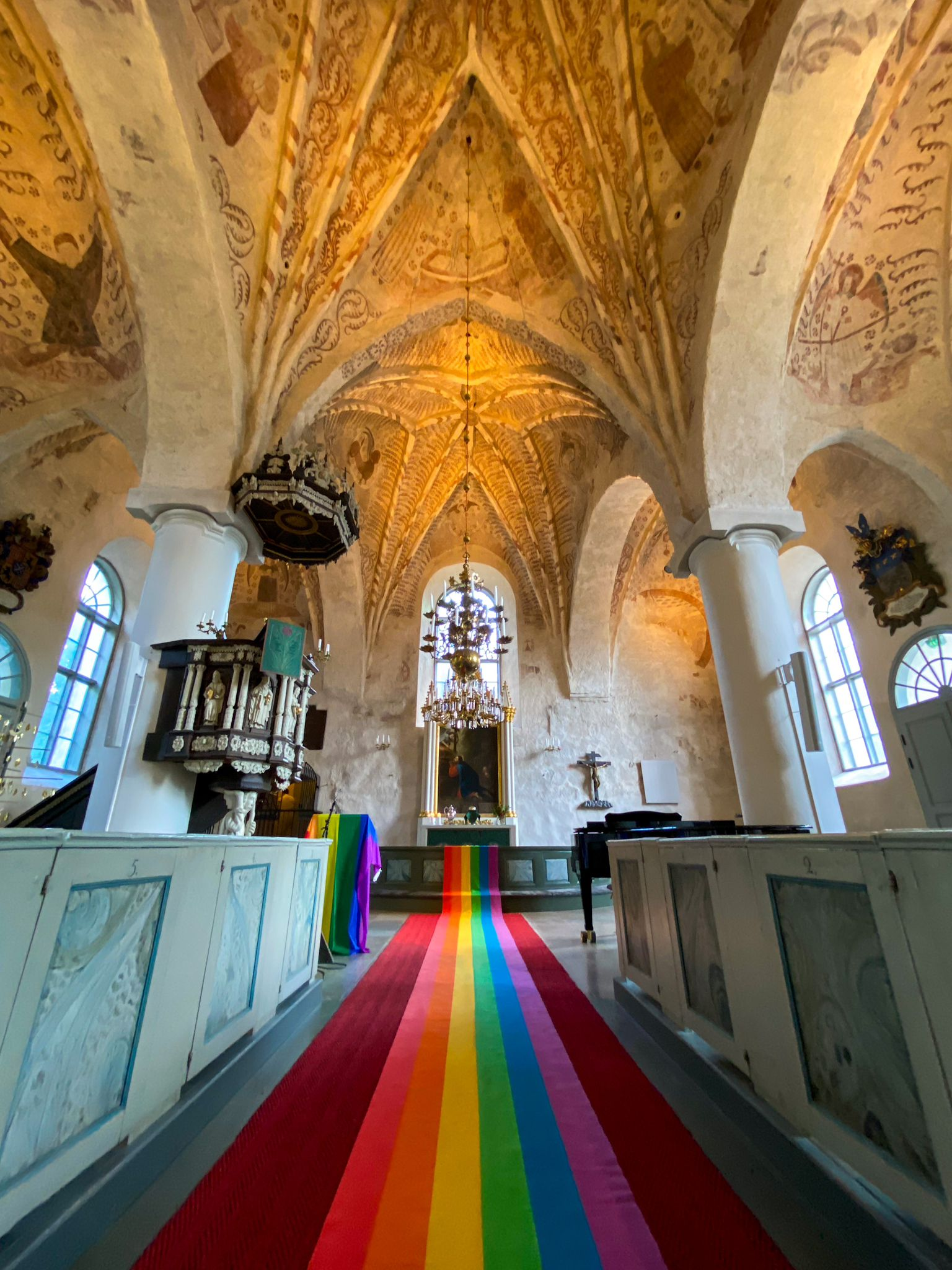
Altar and church hall.

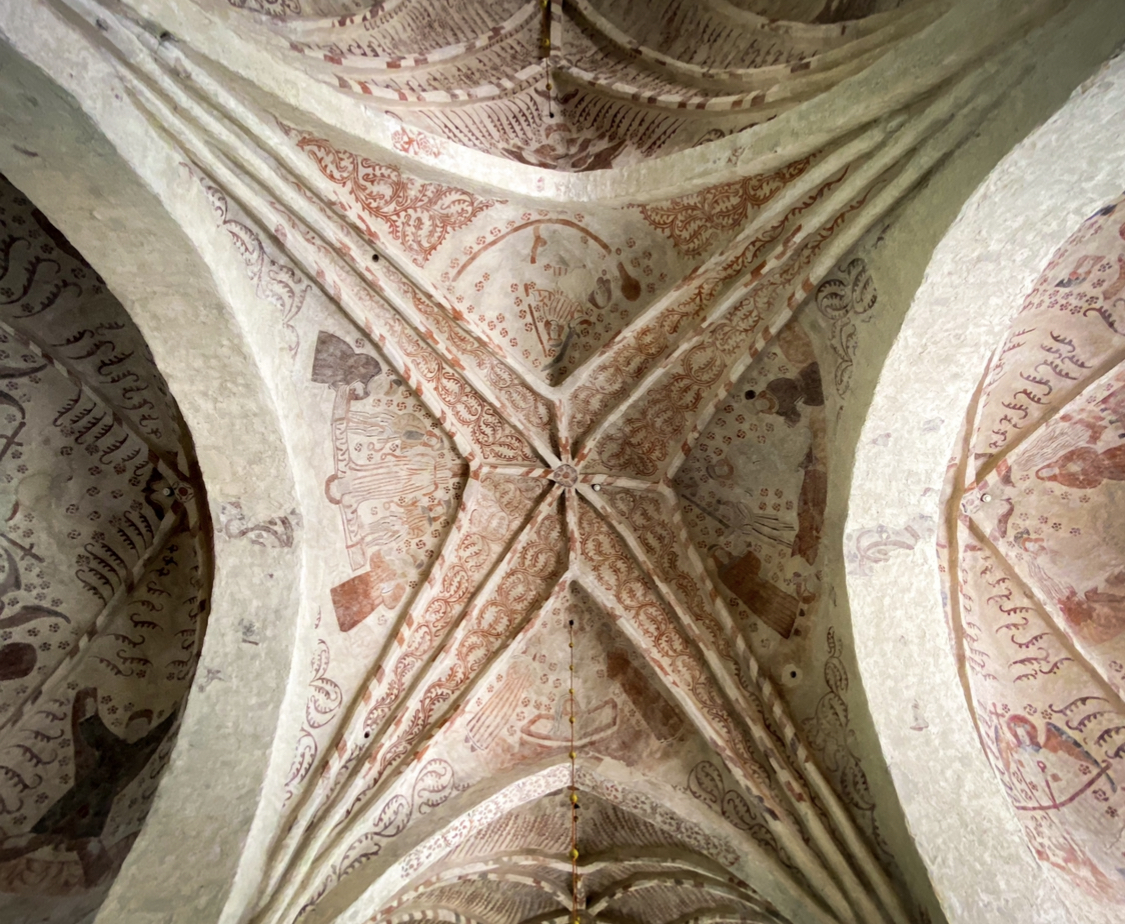
Medieval vault paintings.

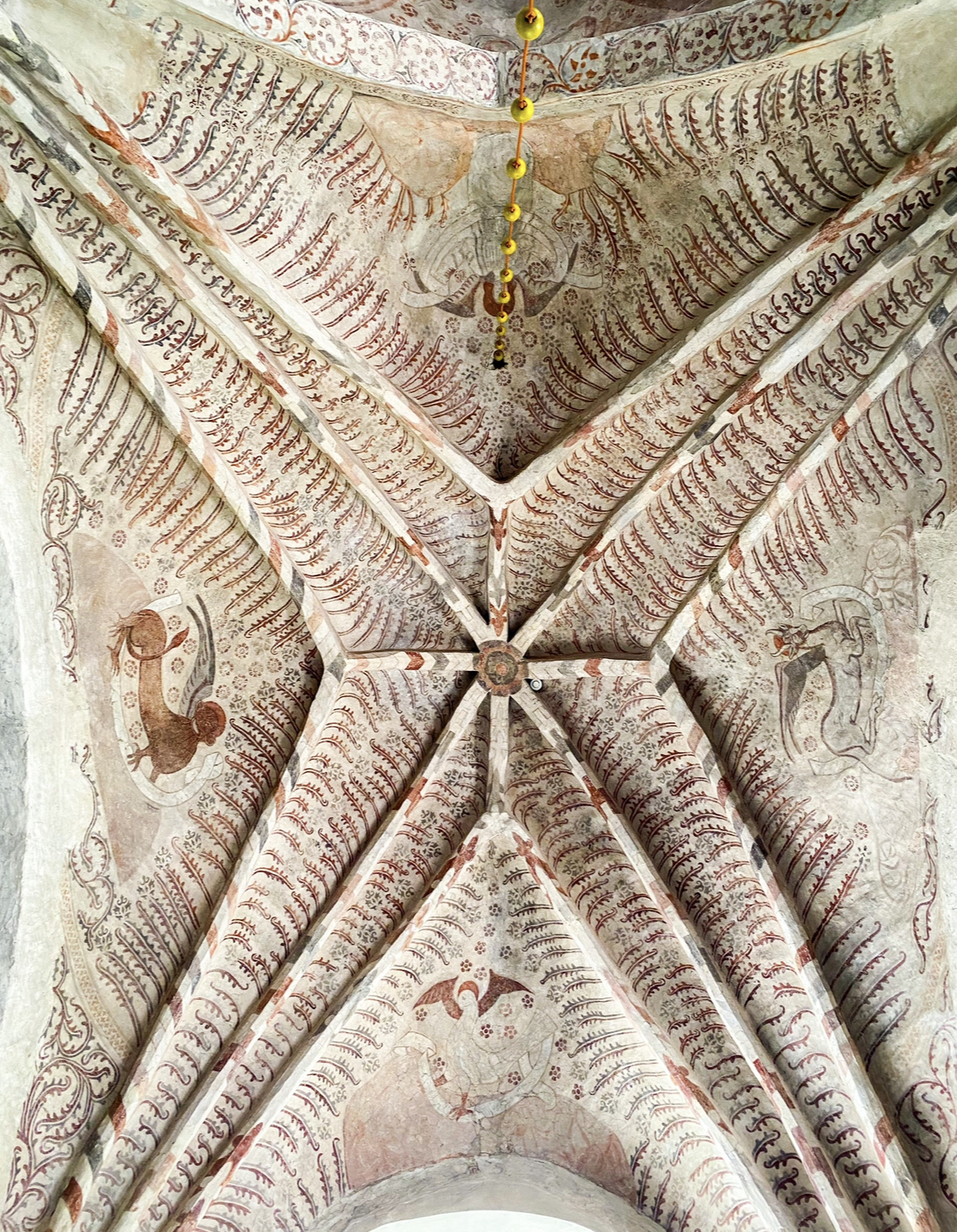
Evangelists depicted on the vaults.

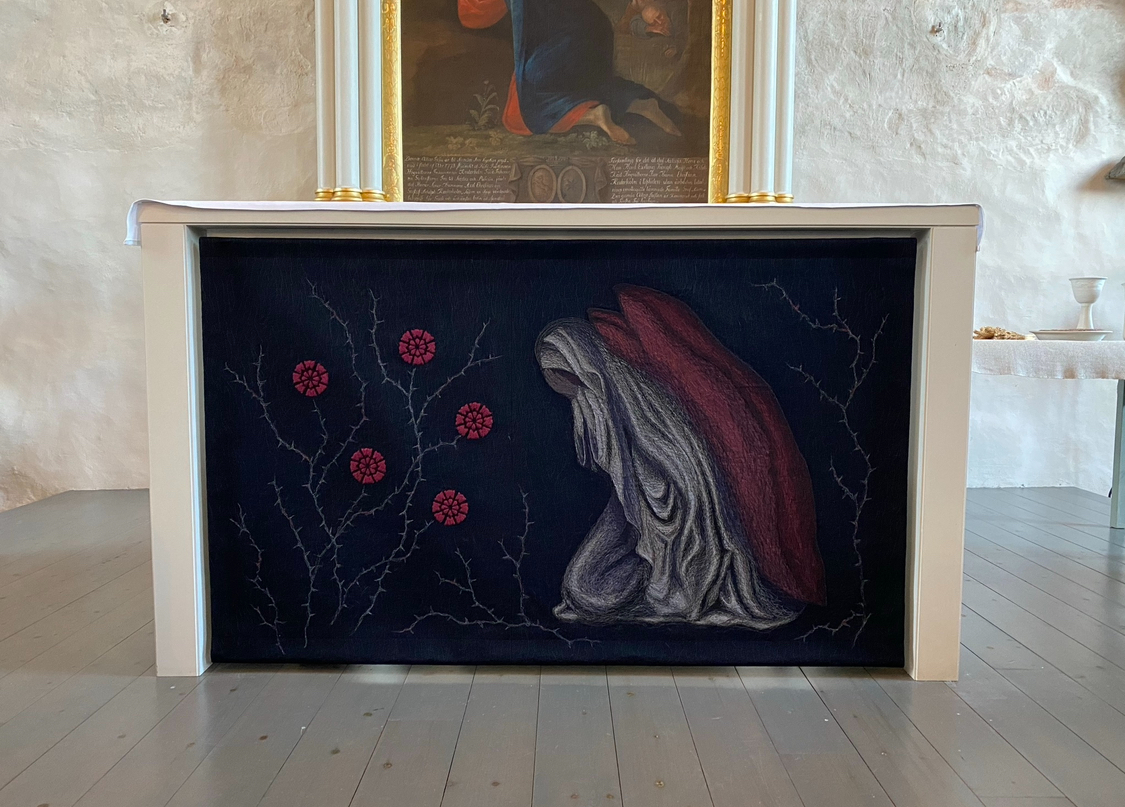
Black church textile made by Helena Vaari.

== See also ==
- Siuntio Church Village
- Diocese of Espoo
- Diocese of Borgå
- Evangelical Lutheran Church of Finland
