= Maria Gyllenstierna af Lundholm =

Swedish baroness and patron of arts

Baroness Maria Gyllenstierna af Lundholm
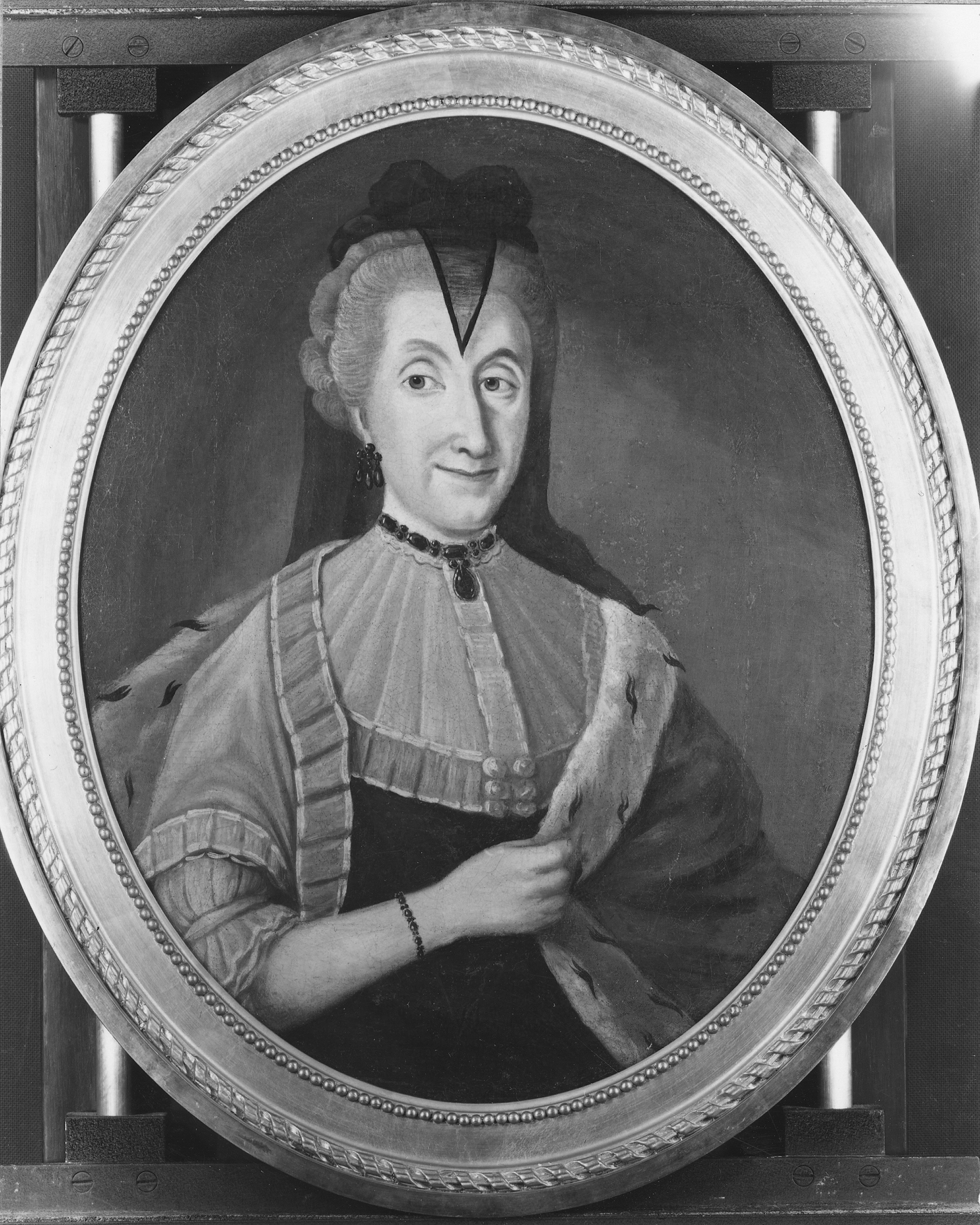
- Baroness Maria Gyllenstierna af Lundholm
- Born: 1716
- Died: 1783
- Burial place: St. Peter's Church in Siuntio
- Occupation: Baroness
- Known for: Patron of arts
- Spouse: Baron Esbjörn Kristian Reuterholm
- Children: Baron Gustaf Adolf Reuterholm
- Father: Axel Erik Gyllenstierna
- Family: Gyllenstierna af Lundholm

Maria Gyllenstierna af Lundholm (born in 1716, died in 1783) was a Swedish baroness and a patron of arts.

== Life ==
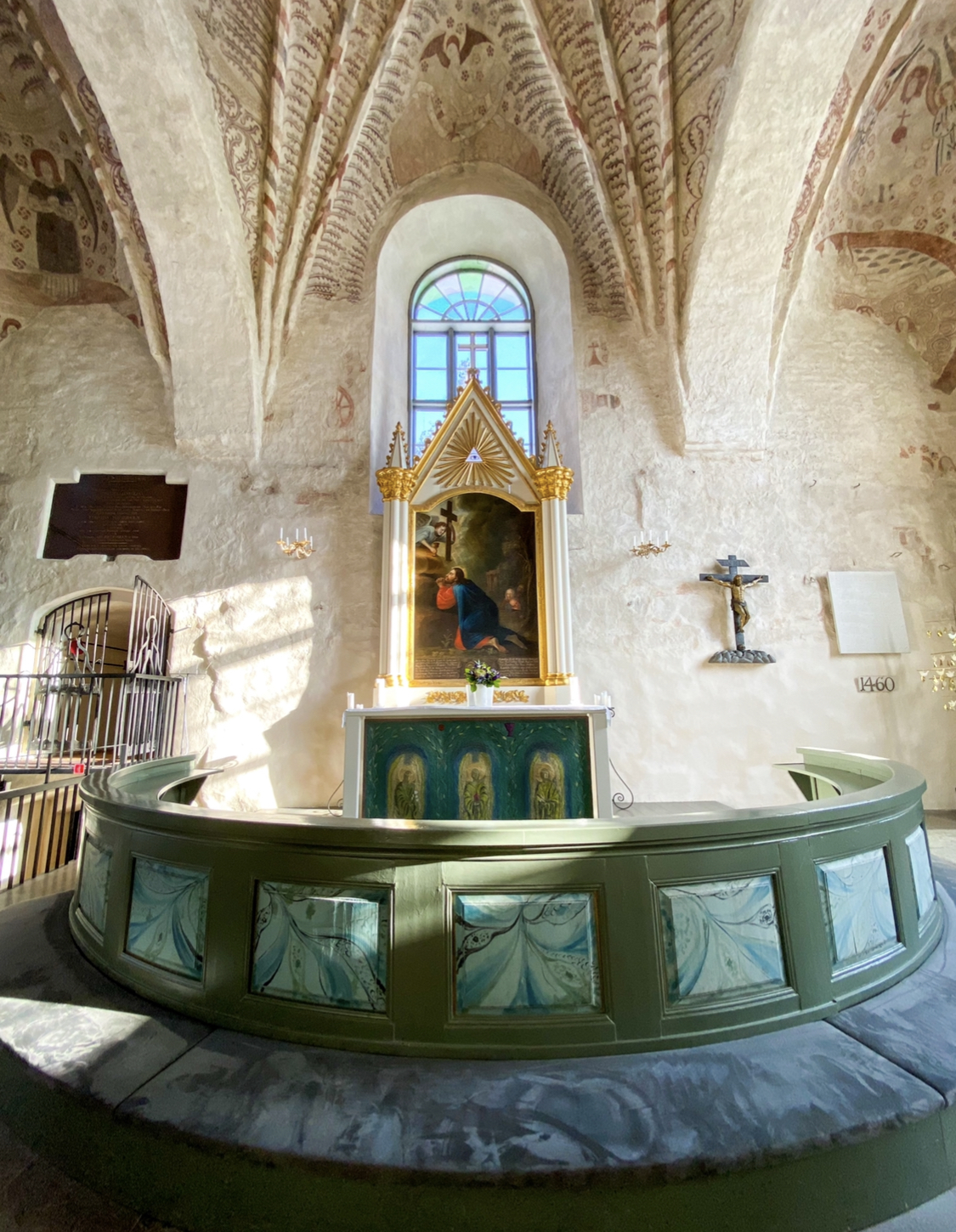
Altar painting in St. Peter's Church in Siuntio.

=== Private life ===
Gyllenstierna af Lundholm was married to baron Esbjörn Kristian Reuterholm (1710–1773). The couple resided at Suitia Manor in Siuntio in present-day Finland. Their son, Baron Gustaf Adolf Reuterholm (1756–1813), was during the regency of Gustav IV Adolf, from 1792 to 1796, the true ruler of the Kingdom of Sweden, as the King was a minor.

=== Patronage ===
Maria Gyllenstierna af Lundholm donated an altarpiece to the St. Peter's Church in Siuntio, depicting Christ in Gethsemane. The altarpiece was painted in Stockholm by an unknown artist. This new altarpiece features gilded frames with the coats of arms of the Reuterholm and Gyllenstierna af Lundholm families at the bottom.

In 1774, the cathedral chapter granted Maria Gyllenstierna af Lundholm a specific burial right. Therefore, Siuntio parish gave her the right to construct a burial chapel adjacent to St.Peter's Church. The Reuterholm burial chapel was built of granite next to the church's eastern wall, near the sacristy. The chapel had an entrance from the church, north of the altar. A gilded monument in a form of an urn was located inside the burial chapel. The walls were decorated with 13 oval-shaped paintings depicting symbolic figures, and four rectangular paintings with different verses written on them. The burial chapel features iron gates, showing the baronial initials, CH. R. H for Christian Reuterholm and M. G. S. for Maria Gyllenstierna af Lundholm, along with another iron gate, both of which are still in place.

In 1815, all removable items were evacuated from the chapel to Sweden after Suitia Manor and all of Finland had become a part of the Russian Empire as the result of the Finnish War. Following the fire in St. Peter's Church in 1823, the church's sacristy and vestibule were demolished. At the same time, the sacristy was moved to the emptied Reuterholm burial chapel.
